= List of Korean War Air National Guard Mobilizations =

Air National Guard (ANG) units of the United States Air Force began to be mobilized in October 1950 when President Harry S. Truman issued federalization orders, bringing ANG units under federal control. Eventually, some 45,000 Air Guardsmen, about 80 percent of the force, were mobilized. Initially mobilized units were deployed to Far East Air Forces (FEAF) for combat operations in Korea. Other mobilized units were deployed to Europe to reinforce United States Air Forces in Europe.

Beginning in Feb 1951, mobilized units were assigned to Air Defense Command (ADC), Strategic Air Command (SAC) and Tactical Air Command (TAC), replacing or augmenting active-duty units. Later many ANG personnel and equipment were redeployed from their active-duty units as individual filler replacements to FEAF as required, being assigned to various combat units as replacements. Guardsmen began to be demobilized in Jul 1952, with their units being inactivated by the active-duty air force. Subsequently, the individual state Air National Guard bureaus re-activated and re-formed the units beginning in Jan 1953.

Unit	State	Deployment Location	Mobilized	Demobilized	Comments
101st Fighter-Interceptor Wing	Maine	Dow AFB, ME; Grenier AFB, NH; Larson AFB, WA	1 Feb 1951	6 Feb 1952	ADC; Consisted of: 101st FIS, 132d FIS, 133d FIS, 136th FIS; assigned to EADF; moved to Grenier AFB, NH, in May 1951; moved to Larson AFB, WA on 2 Aug 1951, transferred to WADF.
101st Fighter-Interceptor Squadron	Massachusetts	Dow AFB, ME	1 Apr 1951	1 Nov 1952	101st FW (ADC): F-80C Shooting Star
102d Bombardment Squadron	New York	Mar AFB, CA	1 Mar 1951	1 Dec 1952	106th BG (SAC), B-29 Superfortress; mission was to train reservists to backfill rotating B-29 combat crews serving in Korea.
103d Bombardment Squadron	Pennsylvania	Fairchild AFB, WA	1 Apr 1951	15 Nov 1952	111th SRW (SAC), RB-29 Superfortress
103d Fighter-Interceptor Wing	Connecticut	Brainard Field, CT; Suffolk County AFB, NY	1 Mar 1951	6 Feb 1952	ADC: 118th FIS, assigned to EADF; moved to Suffolk County AFB, NY, by 1 Jun 1951
105th Fighter-Interceptor Squadron	Tennessee	Berry Field, TN; McGhee-Tyson AFB, TN	1 May 1951	1 Dec 1952	Initially allocated to TAC as 118th Tactical Reconnaissance Wing, transferred to ADC. re-designated as the 105th Fighter Interceptor Squadron. Equipped with F-47D Thunderbolts; assigned to 52d FIW; transferred to 4709th DW 6 Feb 52; moved to McGhee-Tyson AFB, in Jul 52; transferred to 35th AD (CADF) 5 Aug 52
106th Bombardment Group	New York	Mar AFB, CA	1 Mar 1951	1 Dec 1952	SAC: Consisted of: 102d BS, 114th BS
106th Tactical Reconnaissance Squadron	Alabama	Shaw AFB, SC	1 Apr 1951	15 Nov 1952	363d TRG (TAC); RB-26C Invader
107th Fighter-Bomber Squadron	Michigan	Luke AFB, AZ	1 Feb 1951	11 Sep 1952	127th FW (TAC), F-51 Mustang
108th Bombardment Squadron	Illinois	Bordeaux-Mérignac AB, France; Laon-Couvron AB, France	1 Apr 1951	1 Jan 1953	126th FBW (USAFE); B-26 Invader; at Bordeaux AB until 25 May 1952
108th Fighter Group	New Jersey	Turner AFB, GA; Godman AFB, KY	1 Mar 1951	15 Oct 1952	SAC: Assigned to: 40th AD. Consisted of: 141st FS, 149th FS 153d FS; Reassigned 9 Dec 1951 to Godman AFB, KY
109th Fighter-Interceptor Squadron	Minnesota	Holman Field, MN; Wold-Chamberlan APT, MN	1 Mar 1951	15 Oct 1952	133d FIS (ADC); federalized with F-51 Mustangs; moved to Wold-Chamberlan APT, MN 28 Jun 51; transferred to 31st AD 6 Feb 52
110th Composite Squadron	Missouri	George AFB, CA	1 Mar 1951	1 Dec 1952	131st FBW (TAC), F-51 Mustang
111th Strategic Reconnaissance Wing	Pennsylvania	Fairchild AFB, WA	1 Apr 1951	15 Nov 1952	SAC: Consisted of: 103d BS, 130th BS
111th Fighter-Bomber Squadron	Texas	Itazuke AB, Japan; Taegu AB (K-2), South Korea	10 Oct 1950	10 Jul 1952	136th FBW (FEAF); F-84E Thunderjet; Combat in Korea, 1951-1952
112th Tactical Reconnaissance Squadron	Ohio	Toul-Rosières AB, France	2 Oct 1951	10 Jul 1952	117th TRW (USAFE); RB-26C Invader (Night Photographic); Operated from: Wiesbaden AB, West Germany
113th Fighter-Interceptor Wing	District of Columbia	Andrews AFB, MD; Newcastle County APT, DE	1 Feb 1951	1 Nov 1952	ADC; Consisted of: 121st FIS, 142d FIS, 148th FIS, assigned to EADF; moved to Newcastle AFB, DE, on 16 Feb 1951
113th Fighter-Interceptor Squadron	Indiana	Stout Field, IN; Scott AFB, IL	1 Feb 1951	1 Nov 1952	122d FIW (ADC); federalized with F-51H Mustang acft; moved to Scott AFB, IL in May 51; transferred to 4706th Defense Wing 6 Feb 52; transferred to 33rd AD of CADF 1 Apr 52
114th Bombardment Squadron	New York	Mar AFB, CA	1 Mar 1951	1 Dec 1952	106th BG (SAC), B-29 Superfortress; mission was to train reservists to backfill rotating B-29 combat crews serving in Korea.
115th Bombardment Squadron	California	Langley AFB, VA	1 Apr 1951	1 Nov 1952	4400th CCTG (TAC); B-45A Tornado
116th Fighter-Bomber Wing	Georgia	George AFB, CA; Misawa AB, Japan	10 Oct 1950	10 Jul 1952	Deployed to FEAF: Consisted of: 158th FS, 159th FS, 196th FS
116th Fighter Squadron	Washington	Moses Lake AFB, WA; RAF South Ruislip, England; RAF Shepherds Grove, England	1 Feb 1951	1 Nov 1952	Attached to 81st Fighter-Interceptor Group; F-86A Sabre; At Moses Lake AFB until 3 Sep 1951
117th Tactical Reconnaissance Wing	Alabama	Toul-Rosières AB, France	2 Oct 1951	10 Jul 1952	Deployed to USAFE: Consisted of: 112th TRS, 157th FS, 160th FS; Construction at Toul AB forced squadrons to operate as GSUs in West Germany
117th Bombardment Squadron	Pennsylvania	Langley AFB, VA	1 Apr 1951	1 Jan 1953	4400th CCTG (TAC); B-45A Tornado
118th Fighter-Interceptor Squadron	Connecticut	Bradley Field, CT; Suffolk Cty AFB, NY	1 Feb 1951	1 Dec 1952	103d FIW (ADC); F-47N Thunderbolts; moved to Suffolk Co. AFB, NY by 1 May 51; transferred to 4709th Defense Wing 6 Feb 52
120th Fighter-Bomber Squadron	Colorado	Clovis AFB, NM	1 Apr 1951	15 Nov 1952	140th FBW (TAC); F-51 Mustang
121st Fighter-Interceptor Squadron	District of Columbia	Andrews AFB, MD	1 Feb 1951	1 Nov 1952	113th FW (ADC); cony to F-94B by 1 Oct 51; transferred to 4710th Defense Wing 6 Feb 52
122d Fighter-Interceptor Wing	Indiana	Stout Field, IN; Baer Field, IN	1 Feb 1951	1 Nov 1952	ADC: assigned to EADF, 113th FIS, 163d FIS, 166th FIS; moved to Baer Field, IN, by May 1951; transferred to CADF
122d Bombardment Squadron	Louisiana	Langley AFB, VA	1 Apr 1951	1 Jan 1953	4400th CCTG (TAC); A-26B/C Havoc
123d Fighter-Bomber Wing	Kentucky	RAF Manston, England	18 Sep 1951	10 Jul 1952	Deployed to USAFE: Consisted of: 156th FS, 165th FS, 167th FBS
123d Fighter-Interceptor Squadron	Oregon	Portland AFB, OR	1 Feb 1951	1 Dec 1952	325th FIW (ADC); F-51 Mustang, transferred to 4704th DW 6 Feb 52; converted to F-86F Sabre jet acft by 30 Jun 52
124th Fighter-Bomber Squadron	Iowa	Dow AFB, ME	1 Apr 1951	15 Nov 1952	132d FW (TAC) F-51 Mustang; at Dow AFB Apr 1951-Jan 1952; personnel and equipment re-deployed as individual filler replacements Jan 1952, reduced to administrative unit assigned to HQ TAC.
125th Fighter Squadron	Oklahoma	Chaumont-Semoutiers AB, France	10 Oct 1950	10 Jul 1952	137th FBW (USAFE): F-84G Thunderjet
126th Fighter-Bomber Wing	Illinois	Bordeaux-Mérignac AB, France; Laon-Couvron AB, France	1 Apr 1951	1 Jan 1953	Deployed to USAFE; Consisted of: 108th BS, 168th BS, 180th BS; At Bordeaux AB until 25 May 1952
126th Fighter-Interceptor Squadron	Wisconsin	Gen Mitchell Fld, WI; Truax Field, WI	1 Mar 1951	1 Dec 1952	128th FIW (ADC) F-80A Shooting Star; transferred to 31st AD 6 Feb 1952; converted to F-86F Sabre Apr 1952
127th Fighter Squadron	Kansas	Chaumont-Semoutiers AB, France	10 Oct 1950	10 Jul 1952	137th FBW (USAFE): F-84G Thunderjet
127th Fighter-Bomber Wing	Michigan	Luke AFB, AZ	1 Feb 1951	1 Nov 1952	TAC: Consisted of 107th FS, 171st TS, 197th FS
128th Fighter Squadron	Georgia	Chaumont-Semoutiers AB, France	10 Oct 1950	10 Jul 1952	137th FBW (USAFE): F-84G Thunderjet
128th Fighter-Interceptor Wing	Wisconsin	Gen Mitchell Fld, WI; Truax Field, WI	1 Feb 1951	6 Feb 1952	ADC: 126th FIS, 172d FIS, 176th FIS; assigned to EADF; moved to Truax Field, WI, on 16 Feb 1951; transferred to CADF.
130th Bombardment Squadron	West Virginia	Fairchild AFB, WA	1 Apr 1951	15 Nov 1952	111th SRW (SAC), RB-29 Superfortress
131st Fighter-Bomber Wing	Missouri	George AFB, CA	1 Mar 1951	1 Dec 1952	TAC: Consisted of: 110th CS, 178th FS; 170th FBS and 192d FBS at Keflavik APT, Iceland
132d Fighter-Bomber Wing	Iowa	Dow AFB, ME	1 Apr 1951	15 Nov 1952	TAC: Consisted of: 124th FBS, 173d FBS, 174th FBS; at Dow AFB Apr 1951-Jan 1952; personnel and equipment re-deployed as individual filler replacements Jan 1952, reduced to administrative unit assigned to HQ TAC.
132d Fighter-Interceptor Squadron	Maine	Dow AFB, ME	1 Apr 1951	1 Nov 1952	101st FW (ADC): F-80C Shooting Star
133d Fighter-Interceptor Squadron	New Hampshire	Grenier AFB, NH	1 Feb 1951	11 Sep 1952	101st FW (ADC): F-47 Thunderbolt
133d Fighter-Interceptor Wing	Minnesota	Holman Fld, MN; Wold-Chamberlain Field, MN	1 Mar 1951	15 Oct 1952	ANG: assigned to EADF; 109th FIS, 175th FIS, transferred to CADF on 20 May 1951; moved to Wold-Chamberlain APT, MN, on 28 Jun 1951
134th Fighter Squadron	Vermont	Burlington MAP, VT	1 Feb 1951	1 Nov 1952	Activated at home base under ADC; F-51 Mustang
136th Fighter-Interceptor Squadron	New York	Niagara Falls MAP, NY	1 Mar 1951	15 Oct 1952	101st FIS (ADC): F-47D Thunderbolt; transferred to 4708th Defense Wing 6 Feb 52
136th Fighter-Bomber Wing	Texas	Itazuke AB, Japan; Taegu AB (K-2), South Korea	19 Apr 1951	10 Jul 1952	Deployed to FEAF: Consisted of: 111th FBS, 154th FBS, 182d FBS
137th Fighter-Bomber Wing	Oklahoma	Chaumont-Semoutiers AB, France	26 Oct 1950	10 Jul 1952	Deployed to USAFE; Consisted of: 125th FS, 127th FS, 128th FBS
140th Fighter-Bomber Wing	Colorado	Clovis AFB, NM	1 Apr 1951	15 Nov 1952	TAC; Consisted of: 120th FS, 187th FS, 191st FBS
141st Fighter-Bomber Squadron	New Jersey	Turner AFB, GA; Godman AFB, KY	1 Mar 1951	1 Dec 1952	108th FG (SAC), F-84F Thunderstreak. Fighter-Escort Missions; Reassigned 9 Dec 1951 to Godman AFB, KY
142d Fighter-Interceptor Squadron	Delaware	New Castle County APT, DE	1 Feb 1951	1 Nov 1952	113th FIG (ADC), conv to F-94B 1 Oct 51; transferred to 4710th Defense Wing 6 Feb 52
142d Fighter-Interceptor Wing	Washington	Geiger Field, WA; O'Hare IAP, IL	1 Mar 1951	6 Funerary 1952	ADC; assigned to WADF; transferred to EADF on 11 Apr 1951; moved to O'Hare IAP, IL International Airport, by 1 May 1951;
146th Fighter-Bomber Wing	California	Moody AFB, GA	1 Apr 1951	15 Nov 1952	TAC: Consisted of 186th FS, 190th FS, 195th FS (at Van Nuys MAP, CA)
148th Fighter-Bomber Squadron	Pennsylvania	Reading MAP, PA; Dover AFB, DE	1 Feb 1951	1 Nov 1952	113th FW (ADC); conv to F-84C acft in May 51; moved to Dover AFB, DE by May 51; cony to F-94B acft by 1 Oct 51; transferred to 4710th Defense Wing 6 Feb 52
149th Fighter Squadron	Virginia	Turner AFB, GA; Godman AFB, KY	1 Mar 1951	1 Dec 1952	108th FG (SAC), F-84F Thunderstreak. Fighter-Escort Missions; Reassigned 9 Dec 1951 to Godman AFB, KY
153d Fighter Squadron	Mississippi	Turner AFB, GA; Godman AFB, KY	1 Mar 1951	1 Dec 1952	108th FG (SAC), F-84F Thunderstreak. Fighter-Escort Missions; Reassigned 9 Dec 1951 to Godman AFB, KY
154th Fighter Squadron	Arkansas	Itazuke AB, Japan; Taegu AB (K-2), South Korea	10 Oct 1950	10 Jul 1952	136th FBW (FEAF); F-84E Thunderjet; Combat in Korea, 1951-1952
155th Tactical Reconnaissance Squadron	Tennessee	Shaw AFB, SC	1 Apr 1951	15 Nov 1952	363d TRG (TAC); RF-80A Shooting Star
156th Fighter-Bomber Squadron	North Carolina	RAF Manston, England	10 Oct 1950	10 Jul 1952	123d FBW (USAFE); F-84E Thunderjet
157th Fighter-Bomber Squadron	South Carolina	Toul-Rosières AB, France	10 Oct 1950	10 Jul 1952	117th TRW (USAFE); RF-80A Shooting Star; Operated from: Fürstenfeldbruck AB, West Germany
158th Fighter Squadron	Georgia	Misawa AB, Japan	10 Oct 1950	10 Jul 1952	116th FBW (FEAF); F-84D Thunderjet; Combat in Korea, 1951-1952
159th Fighter Squadron	Florida	Misawa AB, Japan	10 Oct 1950	10 Jul 1952	116th FBW (FEAF); F-84D Thunderjet; Combat in Korea, 1951-1952
160th Fighter Squadron	Alabama	Toul-Rosières AB, France	10 Oct 1950	10 Jul 1952	117th TRW (USAFE); RF-80A Shooting Star; Operated from: Neubiberg AB, West Germany
163d Fighter-Interceptor Squadron	Indiana	Baer Field, IN; Sioux City MAP, IA	1 Feb 1951	1 Nov 1952	122d FIW (ADC); federalized with F-51D acft; transferred to 31st AD 6 Feb 52; moved to Sioux City MAP, IA, 10 Mar 52
165th Fighter-Bomber Squadron	Kentucky	RAF Manston, England	10 Oct 1950	10 Jul 1952	123d FBW (USAFE); F-84E Thunderjet
166th Fighter-Interceptor Squadron	Ohio	Lockbourne AFB, OH; Youngstown MAP, OH	1 Feb 1951	1 Nov 1952	122d FIW (ADC); federalized With F-84C Scorpions; transferred to 4706th DW 6 Feb 52; moved to Youngstown MAP, OH in Aug 52; transferred to 4708th DW in Aug 52
167th Fighter-Bomber Squadron	West Virginia	RAF Manston, England	10 Oct 1950	10 Jul 1952	123d FBW (USAFE); F-84E Thunderjet
168th Bombardment Squadron	Illinois	Bordeaux-Mérignac AB, France; Laon-Couvron AB, France	1 Apr 1951	1 Jan 1953	126th FBW (USAFE); B-26 Invader; at Bordeaux AB until 25 May 1952
170th Fighter Bomber Squadron	Illinois	Keflavik APT, Iceland	1 Mar 1951	1 Dec 1952	131st FBW (TAC), at George AFB, CA; F-51 Mustang
171st Training Squadron	Michigan	Luke AFB, AZ	1 Feb 1951	1 Nov 1952	127th FW (TAC), F-51 Mustang
172d Fighter-Interceptor Squadron	Michigan	Gen Mitchell Fld, WI; Truax Field, WI	1 Feb 1951	1 Nov 1952	128th FIW (ADC) F-80A Shooting Star; transferred to 31st AD 6 Feb 1952; converted to F-86F Sabre Apr 1952
173d Fighter-Bomber Squadron	Nebraska	Dow AFB, ME	1 Apr 1951	15 Nov 1952	132d FW (TAC) F-51 Mustang; at Dow AFB Apr 1951-Jan 1952; personnel and equipment re-deployed as individual filler replacements Jan 1952, reduced to administrative unit assigned to HQ TAC.
174th Fighter-Bomber Squadron	Iowa	Dow AFB, ME	1 Apr 1951	15 Nov 1952	132d FW (TAC) F-51 Mustang; at Dow AFB Apr 1951-Jan 1952; personnel and equipment re-deployed as individual filler replacements Jan 1952, reduced to administrative unit assigned to HQ TAC.
175th Fighter-Interceptor Squadron	South Dakota	Sioux Falls MAP, SD; Rapid City AFB, SD	1 Apr 1951	15 Nov 1952	133d FIS (ADC); transferred to 31st AD 6 Feb 52
176th Fighter-Interceptor Squadron	Wisconsin	Truax Fld, WI	1 Feb 1951	31 Oct 1952	128th FIW (ADC); federalized with F-51 Mustangs; transferred to 31st AD 6 Feb 52; cony to F-89C Scorpion Mar 52;
178th Fighter Squadron	North Dakota	George AFB, CA	1 Apr 1951	15 Nov 1952	131st FBW (TAC), F-51 Mustang
179th Fighter-Interceptor Squadron	Minnesota	Duluth Aprt, MN	1 Mar 1951	1 Oct 1952	ADC: 31st AD; F-51D Mustang
180th Bombardment Squadron	Missouri	Bordeaux-Mérignac AB, France; Laon-Couvron AB, France	1 Apr 1951	1 Jan 1953	126th FBW (USAFE); B-26 Invader; at Bordeaux AB until 25 May 1952
182d Fighter-Bomber Squadron	Texas	Itazuke AB, Japan; Taegu AB (K-2), South Korea	10 Oct 1950	10 Jul 1952	136th FBW (FEAF); F-84E Thunderjet; Combat in Korea, 1951-1952
185th Tactical Reconnaissance Squadron	Oklahoma	Shaw AFB, SC	1 Apr 1951	15 Nov 1952	363d TRG (TAC); RF-80A Shooting Star
186th Fighter Squadron	Montana	Moody AFB, GA	1 Apr 1951	15 Nov 1952	146th FS (TAC) F-51 Mustang
187th Fighter-Bomber Squadron	Wyoming	Clovis AFB, NM	1 Apr 1951	15 Nov 1952	140th FBW (TAC); F-51 Mustang
188th Fighter-Bomber Squadron	New Mexico	Long Beach Aprt, CA	1 Feb 1951	11 Sep 1952	1st FIW (ADC); F-51 Mustang; to 4705th DW, 6 Feb 1952; 27th AD, 1 Mar 1952
190th Fighter Squadron	Idaho	Moody AFB, GA	1 Apr 1951	1 Jan 1953	146th FS (TAC) F-51 Mustang
191st Fighter-Bomber Squadron	Utah	Clovis AFB, NM	1 Apr 1951	15 Nov 1952	140th FBW (TAC); F-51 Mustang
192d Fighter-Bomber Squadron	Nevada	Keflavik APT, Iceland	1 Mar 1951	15 Oct 1952	131st FBW (TAC), at George AFB, CA; F-51 Mustang
195th Fighter Squadron	California	Van Nuys Aprt, CA	1 Mar 1951	11 Dec 1952	146th FW (TAC); F-51 Mustang, parent 146th FW transferred to Moody AFB, GA, remained as GSU.
196th Fighter-Bomber Squadron	California	Misawa AB, Japan	10 Oct 1950	10 Jul 1952	116th FBW (FEAF); F-84D Thunderjet; Combat in Korea, 1951-1952
197th Fighter Squadron	Arizona	Luke AFB, CA	1 Feb 1951	1 Nov 1952	127th FW (TAC), F-84A Thunderjet

== See also ==
- USAF units and aircraft of the Korean War
- Air National Guard
