= 158th Airlift Squadron =

United States military unit

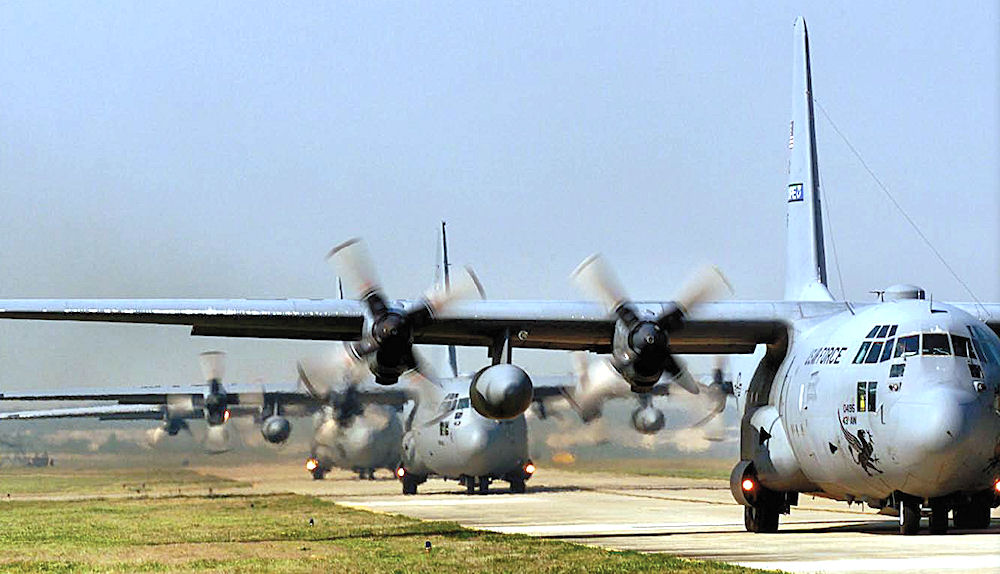
- 158th Airlift Squadron C-130s taxiing at Savannah AGB
- Active: 1 October 1942 – present
- Country: United States
- Allegiance: Georgia (U.S. state)
- Branch: Air National Guard
- Type: Squadron
- Role: Airlift
- Part of: Georgia Air National Guard
- Garrison/HQ: Savannah Air National Guard Base, Savannah, Georgia
- Tail Code: Red tail stripe "Savannah" in white letters
- Engagements: World War II Assigned Fuselage Code: YJ

Insignia
- 158th Airlift Squadron emblem

The 158th Airlift Squadron (158 AS) is a unit of the Georgia Air National Guard's 165th Airlift Wing (165 AW) located at Savannah Air National Guard Base, Georgia. The 158th is equipped with the C-130J Super Hercules and is operationally-gained by the Air Mobility Command (AMC).

== Overview ==
158th Airlift Squadron flies the C-130J Super Hercules, which performs the tactical portion of the airlift mission. The aircraft is capable of operating from rough, dirt strips and is the prime transport for air dropping troops and equipment into hostile areas.

== History ==
=== World War II ===
see: 353d Fighter Group for full World War II history

Activated in late 1942. Trained under First Air Force in northeastern United States with P-40 Warhawks, also performing Air Defense as part of Norfolk and Philadelphia Fighter Wings. Deployed to European Theater of Operations, June 1943, being equipped with P-47 Thunderbolts in England. Assigned as a heavy bomber escort squadron under VIII Fighter Command. Re-equipped with long-range P-51D Mustangs, July 1944, Thunderbolts being transferred to IX Fighter Command as tactical fighter-bombers supporting ground forces in France. Performed bomber escort missions until the end of the war in Europe, April 1945.

Squadron demobilized in England during the summer of 1945, inactivated in United States as a paper unit, October 1945. Became part of postwar Georgia Air National Guard in May 1946.

=== Georgia Air National Guard ===
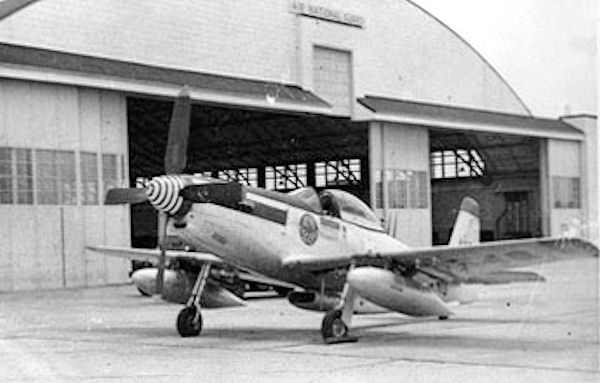
158th Fighter Squadron F-51H Mustang, 1952

The wartime 351st Fighter Squadron was re-activated and re-designated as the 158th Fighter Squadron, and was allotted to the Georgia Air National Guard, on 24 May 1946. It was organized at Chatham Field(Chatham Army Air Field)(Also known as Travis Field), Savannah, Georgia, and was extended federal recognition on 20 August 1946 by the National Guard Bureau. The 158th Fighter Squadron was entitled to the history, honors, and colors of the 351st Fighter Squadron.

The squadron was equipped with F-47N Thunderbolts and was temporarily assigned to the 54th Fighter Wing on 20 August, then permanently to the 116th Fighter Group on 9 September 1946. The 116th Fighter Group consisted of the 158th and the 128th Fighter Squadron at Marietta Army Airfield, near Atlanta. In March 1949, the 158th moved to Hunter AFB, near Savannah. As part of the Continental Air Command Fourteenth Air Force, the unit trained for tactical fighter missions and air-to-air combat.

==== Combat in Korean War ====
The 158th Fighter Squadron and its parent 116th Fighter Group were federalized on 10 October 1950 due to the Korean War. In November the units were assigned initially to Tactical Air Command (TAC) and moved to George AFB, California where they were joined by the 159th Fighter Squadron (Jet Propelled) from the Florida ANG and the 196th Fighter Squadron (Jet Propelled) from the California ANG. On 11 November the 116th was changed in status to become the 116th Fighter-Bomber Wing. At George the three fighter squadrons were equipped with F-80C Shooting Stars and began operational training.

After losing many of their F-80 pilots to assignment to Far East Air Force as replacements, all three squadrons were forced to transfer pilots between themselves in order to maintain a balance of qualified pilots, and they were no longer individual squadrons of Georgia, Florida and California. In April 1951 116th Fighter Bomber Wing (FBW) began receiving brand new F-84E Thunderjets directly from Republic. On 14 May the 116th FBW received a Warning Order for an impending transfer, and they expected to be transferred to Europe. With a Readiness Date of 25 June, the 116th FBW was ready to move, and by 1 July they had sent their seventy-five F-84Es to the New York POE for shipment to France. However, on 3 July 1951 they received orders transferring them to Japan. Fifty-four F-84Es had to be obtained from Bergstrom AFB, Texas and Langley AFB, Virginia as partial replacements for these Thunderjets.

The 116th FBG with the 158th and 159th FBS's departed from San Diego on the transport aircraft carrier USS Windham Bay on 12 July, while the 196th FBS had preceded them by two days on the USS Sitkoh Bay. The USAF, having learned from the expensive previous experience with open air transportation of the F-84 on an aircraft carrier deck, heavily protected their F-84s this time with cosmoline and tarpaulins. The wing off-loaded at Yokosuka Naval Base, Japan, between 24 and 27 July, with their aircraft being barged to Kisarazu, Japan, for cleaning and preparation for flight. Regardless of the care taken, thirty-three F-84s suffered some degree of salt damage.

Two squadrons, the 158th and 159th FBSs, were then sent to Misawa Air Base, Japan, while the 196th was established at Chitose Air Base, Japan. Their initial role was to serve as an augmentation of Japanese air defenses, and their op¬erational training began on 6 August. The 116th FBW remained on garrison duty in Japan into fall 1951. During that period they concentrated on providing air-to-ground support to Army units training in Japan as well as assisting in providing aerial defense of northern Japan as a supplement to the other air defense units.

On 30 November 1951 the 159th FBS was alerted for a combat role, and on 2 December they dispatched sixteen F-84Es to Taegu AB (K-2), South Korea. The 159th FBS flew their first combat mission of twelve Thunderjets to rail targets at Wonsan in southeastern North Korea that morning. Three F-84s suffered flak damage. They then returned again that afternoon. The following day they again returned to Wonsan two fly two more strikes. Further missions were flown on 4 and 5 December, and then on 6 December they sent twelve F-84s to Sinanju and Sunchon, also in North Korea on a rail cutting mission, and then returned to Misawa AB.

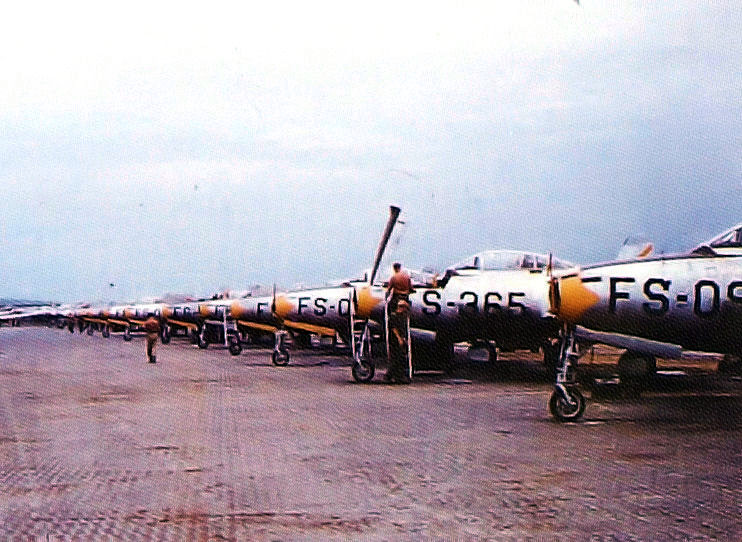
158th Fighter Squadron flightline at Tageu AB (K-2), South Korea June 1952.

On 12 December the 1116th FBW pilots flew eighty-eight effective combat sorties. On 15 December the 158th FBS was attacking a train when they were jumped by North Korean MiG-15s that attacked from 20,000 feet in pairs from the F-84s Six O'clock High position. Captain Paul Mitchel, flying as "Able 3" saw two MiGs behind two F-84s, so he came in behind them and closed to 100 feet, firing on the MiG leader's wingman. The MiG pilot bailed out, and his leader slowed down to see what was happening, so Mitchel fired on him, too, scoring some hits. Mitchel was credited with 1-0-1, obtaining the last officially credited F-84 MiG kill during the Korean War, and the only "kill" for the 116th FBW. The following day, 16 December, the 158th FBS lost their only aircraft attributed to enemy action during the conflict. While strafing ox carts south of Pyongyang Captain David Mather, "George 3", was hit by antiaircraft fire and his F-84 burst into flames. His wingman told him to bail out, and Mather's canopy was seen to come off, but the F-84 crashed before he could get out. On 18 December the 158th FBS returned to Japan.

The 196th FBS started for Taegu AB (K-2) on 26 December for their turn, but didn't get there until 28 December, because of weather problems. The 196th FBS flew missions from K-2 until 3 January 1952, mostly close air support, with a 70% accuracy, and returned to Japan on 4 January 1952. The 116th FBG returned to combat on 26 May 1952. The first mission was with sixteen F-84Es that flew from Misawa to Chitose AB for a pilot briefing, and then after arming with 500-pound general-purpose bombs, they took off for an attack against Sariwon, in southwestern North Korea. The F-84s were refueled en route by KB-29 Superfortress tankers near Taegu, South Korea, upon their return from the target, which gave any aircraft unable to be aerial refueled an alternate landing spot. After refueling the mission landed at Johnson Air Base, Japan, and resumed the air defense mission.

On 10 June 1952 the 116th FBW was relieved from assignment to TAC and reassigned to Far East Air Force without personnel. The Guardsmen were returned to the United States; the jets and equipment of the wing were then re-designated as the 474th Fighter-Bomber Wing and assigned to Fifth Air Force.

==== Air Defense Command ====
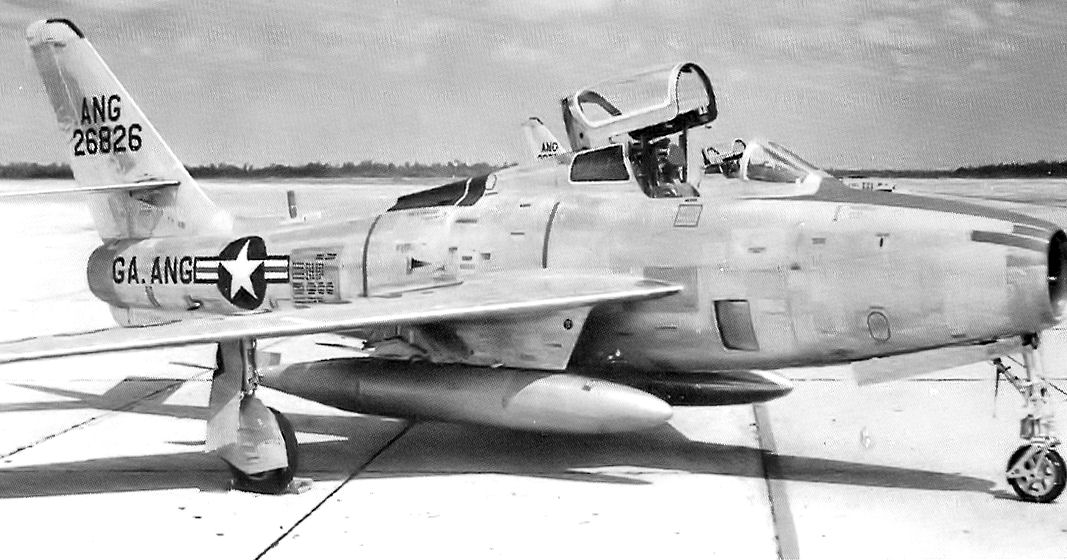
158th Airlift Squadron Republic F-84F-50-RE Thunderstreak 52-6826

The 116th Fighter-Bomber Wing status was returned to a Group designation, and the unit was returned to the Georgia Air National Guard. At this time the Group was restructured to include the 128th at Dobbins AFB and the 158th Fighter Squadron was returned to Chatham AFB. Initially upon their return to State Control both squadrons were equipped with the long-range F-51H Mustang and given an air defense mission. The 116th was assigned to Air Defense Command (ADC), being assigned to the 35th Air Division with a mission of the air defense of the Southeastern United States.

Commencing in July 1953 the 158th began conversion to F-84D Thunderjet, yet most were not received until mid summer. On 1 July 1955 the 158th was re-designated as the 158th Fighter-Interceptor Squadron and converted the swept-wing F-84F Thunderstreak in March 1957.

On 10 July 1958 the 165th Fighter Interceptor Group was activated at Savannah with the 158th FIS assigned as their flying unit. The 158th FIS then switched to the F-86L Sabre Interceptor in 1958, a day/night/all-weather aircraft designed to be integrated into the ADC SAGE interceptor direction and control system. In 1958, the 116th implemented the ADC Runway Alert Program, in which interceptors of the 128th Fighter-Interceptor Squadron were committed to a five-minute runway alert.

==== Airlift mission ====
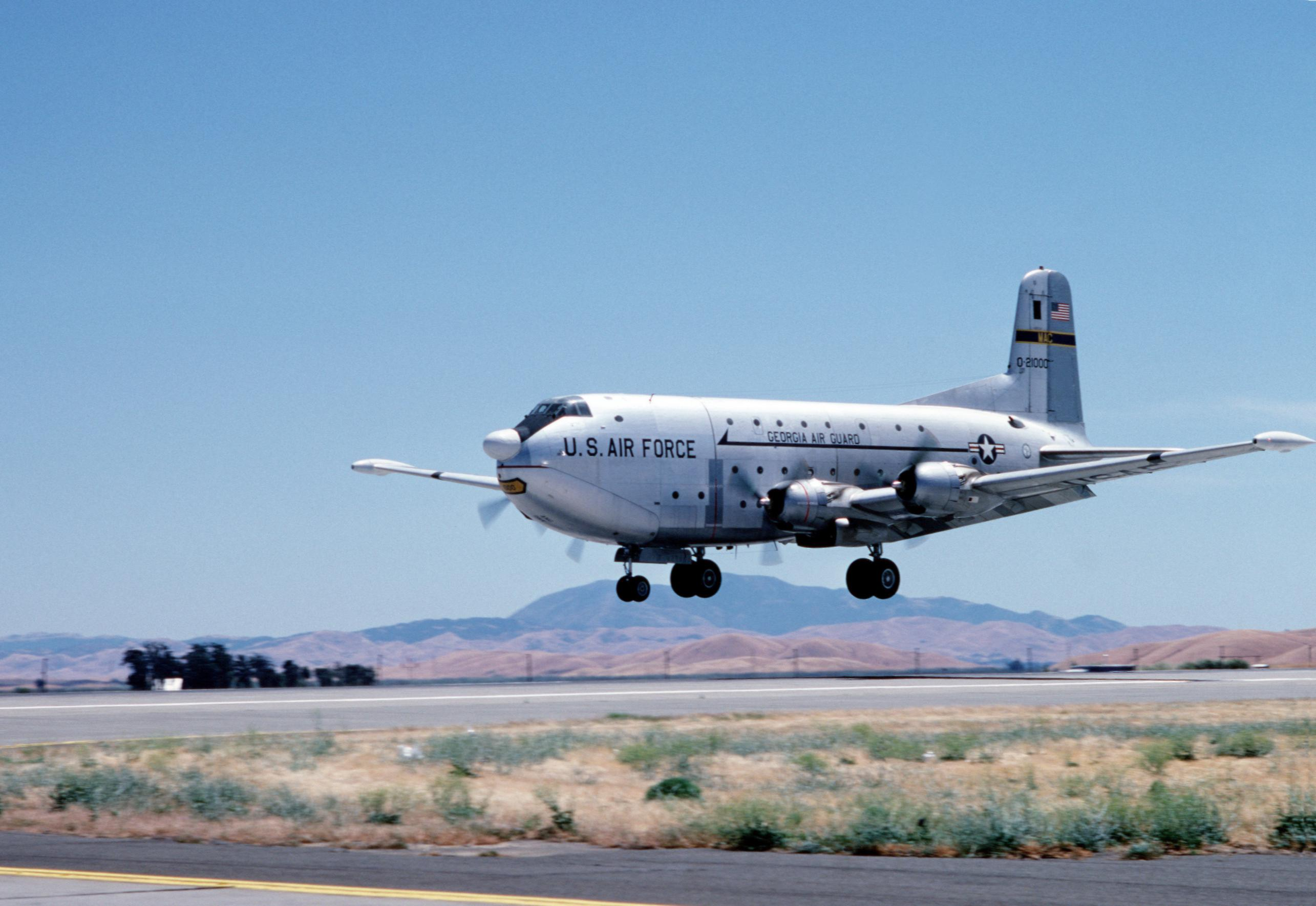
158th MAS C-124C landing at Travis AFB, California, 1974

Reorganization came in 1962 when the unit transitioned from a fighter mission to an airlift mission The 158th Fighter Squadron became 158th Air Transport Squadron on 1 July 1962 assigned to the 165th Air Group. They traded in its Sabre interceptors for 4-engines C-97 Stratofreighter transports. With air transportation recognized as a critical wartime need, the squadron was re-designated the 128th Air Transport Squadron (Heavy). The 116th ATG was assigned to the MATS Eastern Transport Air Force, (EASTAF), and the squadron flew long-distance transport missions in support of Air Force requirements, frequently sending aircraft to the Caribbean, Europe Greenland, and the Middle East in support of Air Force requirements.

In 1966 MATS became the Military Airlift Command (MAC) and EASTAF became the MAC Twenty-First Air Force. The 116th ATG was upgraded to the C-124 Globemaster II strategic heavy airlifter in 1967. Due to requirements generated by the Vietnam War, missions were flown across the Pacific to Hawaii, Japan, the Philippines, South Vietnam, Okinawa and Thailand.

On 8 August 1975, the first of the C-130E aircraft, aptly named "Hercules", came to the City of Savannah at the international airport to replace the older C-124's. While the C-124's were being retired from the Air Force inventory, the C-130s were arriving at the 165th Tactical Airlift Group.

The 158th received seven new C-130H Hercules aircraft directly from the Lockheed Factory manufactured for the unit during September and October 1981. On 15 April 1992, the unit was redesignated the 165th Airlift Group. On 1 October 1995, the unit received its current designation, the 165th Airlift Wing. On 22 January 2024, the 158th received its first of eight planned C-130J-30 Super Hercules.

=== Lineage ===
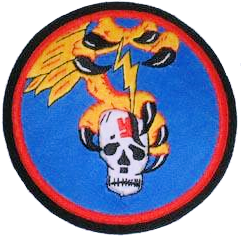
World War II 351st Fighter Squadron Emblem

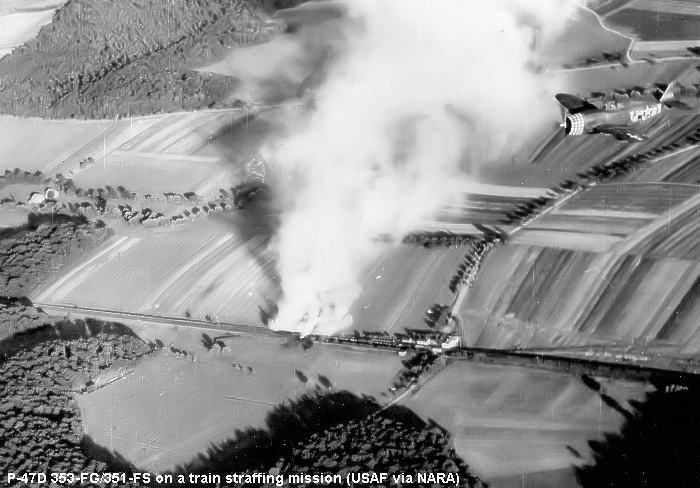
P-47D of the 351st FS on a train strafing mission

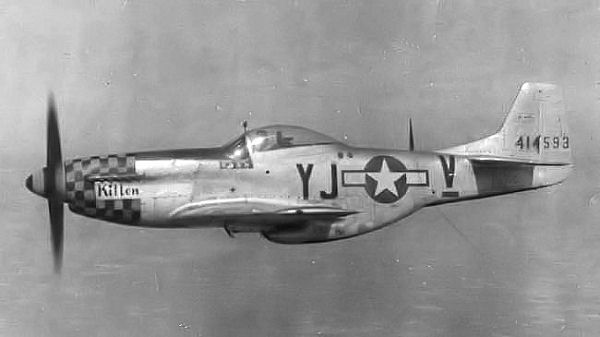
351st FS North American P-51D-10-NA Mustang 44-14593 in flight, 1945

- Constituted 351st Fighter Squadron on 29 September 1942

Activated on 1 October 1942
Inactivated on 18 October 1945.

- Redesignated 158th Fighter Squadron, and allotted to Georgia ANG, on 24 May 1946

Extended federal recognition on 20 August 1946
Federalized and placed on active duty, 10 October 1950
Released from active duty and returned to Georgia state control, 10 July 1952
Re-designated: 158th Fighter-Interceptor Squadron on 10 July 1952
Re-designated: 158th Fighter-Bomber Squadron on 1 December 1952
Re-designated: 158th Fighter-Interceptor Squadron on 1 July 1955
Re-designated: 158th Air Transport Squadron on 1 July 1962
Re-designated: 158th Military Airlift Squadron on 8 January 1966
Re-designated: 158th Tactical Airlift Squadron on 8 August 1975
Re-designated: 158th Airlift Squadron on 16 March 1992

=== Assignments ===
- 353d Fighter Group, 1 October 1942 – 18 October 1945
- 54th Fighter Wing, 20 August 1946
- 116th Fighter Group, 9 September 1946
- 116th Fighter-Bomber Wing, 10 October 1950
- 137th Fighter-Bomber Wing, Nov 1950
- 116th Fighter-Interceptor Group, 10 July 1952
- 116th Fighter-Bomber Group, 1 December 1952
- 165th Fighter-Interceptor Group, 10 July 1958
- 165th Air Transport Group, 1 July 1962
- 165th Military Airlift Group, 8 January 1966
- 165th Tactical Airlift Group, 8 August 1975
- 165th Airlift Group, 16 March 1992
- 165th Operations Group, 1 October 1995

=== Stations ===
- Mitchel Field, New York, 1 October 1942
- Richmond Army Air Base, Virginia, c. 7 October 1942
- Norfolk Army Airfield, Virginia, 23 October 1942
- Millville Army Airfield, New Jersey, 16 February – 27 May 1943
- RAF Goxhill (AAF-345), England, 8 June 1943
- RAF Metfield (AAF-366), England, 5 August 1943
- RAF Raydon (AAF-157), England, 14 April 1944 – 11 October 1945
- Camp Kilmer, New Jersey, 16–18 October 1945
- Chatham Field, Georgia, 20 August 1946
- Hunter AFB, Georgia, 1 March 1949
- George AFB, California, 1 November 1950 – 12 July 1951

Operated from Misawa AB, Japan, 1 August 1951 – 10 July 1952

Further operated from Taegu AB (K-2), South Korea, 2 December 1950 – 4 January 1952; 26 May 1952 – 10 July 1952

- Chatham Field Chatham Army Air Field| later: Travis Field| later: Savannah International Airport, 10 July 1952

Designated: Savannah Air National Guard Base, 1991 – present

=== Aircraft ===
- P-40 Warhawk, 1942–1943
- P-47 Thunderbolt, 1943–1944
- P-51 Mustang, 1944–1945; Flown by Lt Robert F Hahn
- F-47N Thunderbolt, 1946–1950
- F-84G Thunderjet, 1950–1952
- F-51H Mustang, 1952
- F-84D Thunderjet, 1952–1955
- F-84F Thunderstreak, 1955–1958
- F-86L Sabre Interceptor, 1958–1962
- C-97F Stratofreighter, 1962–1965
- C-124C Globemaster II, 1967–1975
- C-130E Hercules, 1975–1981
- C-130H Hercules, 1981–2016
- C-130H3 Hercules, 2015 – 2024
- C-130J Hercules, 2024 – present
