= 116th Operations Group =

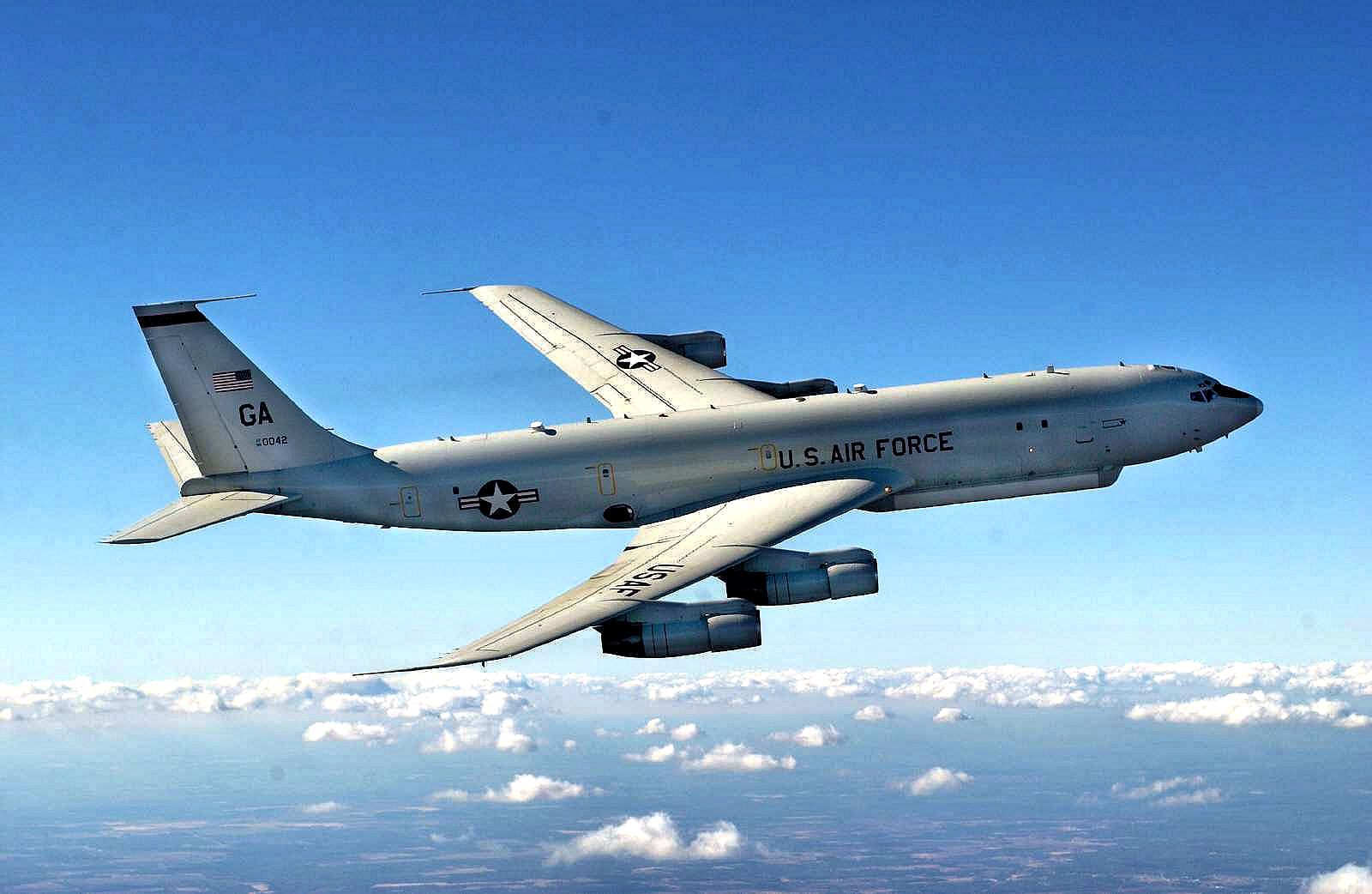
- 116th Air Control Wing E-8C Joint STARS 96-0042
- Active: 1942–1945; 1946–1952; 1952–1974, 1992–present
- Country: United States
- Branch: Air National Guard
- Role: Command and Control
- Part of: Georgia Air National Guard
- Garrison/HQ: Robins Air Force Base, Georgia
- Nickname: Slybird Group (WW II)
- Motto: Vincet Amor Patriae Latin Love of Country Shall Conquer
- Tail Code: GA
- Engagements: European Theater of Operations; Korean War
- Decorations: Distinguished Unit Citation

Insignia
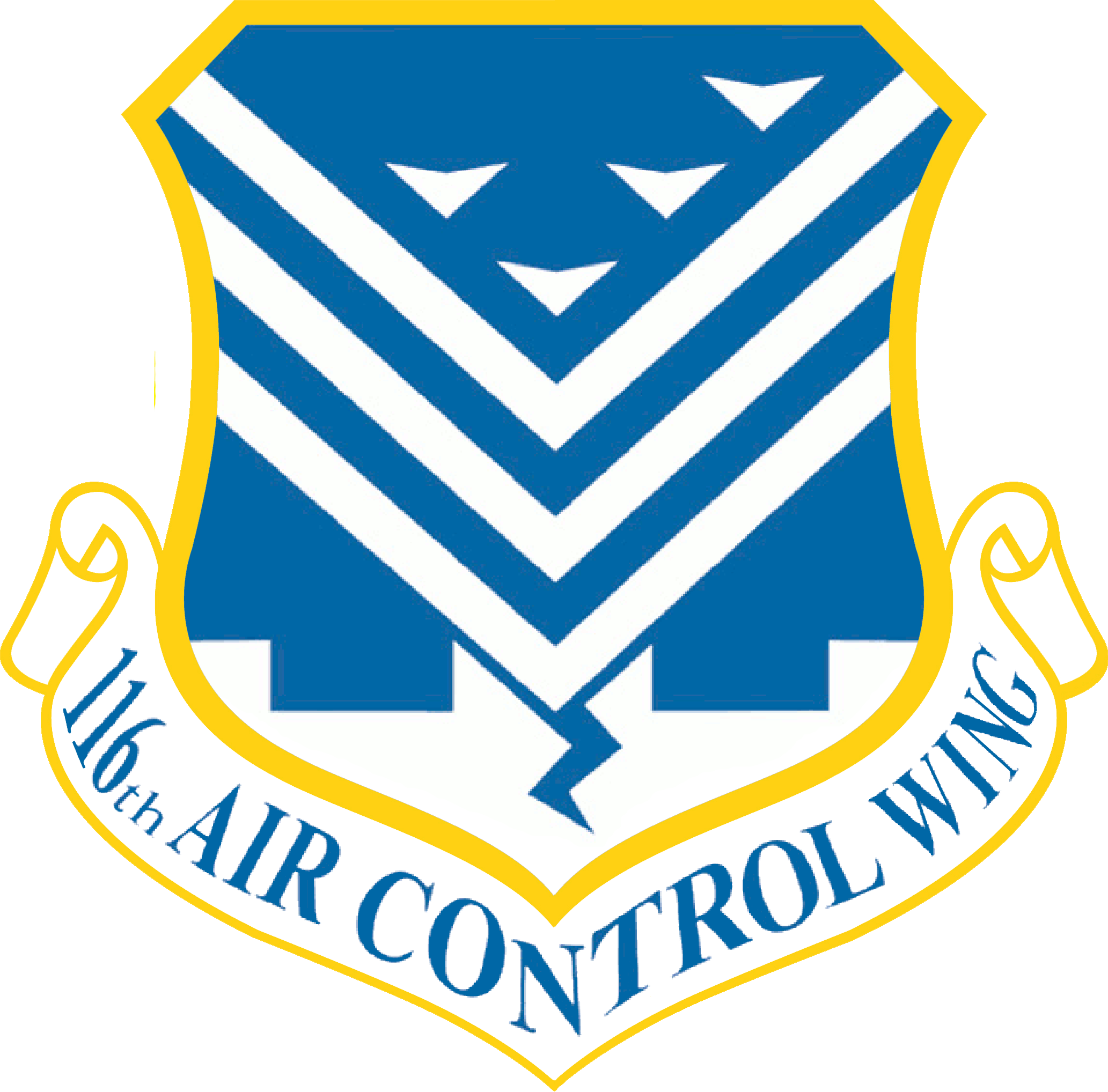
- 116th Operations Group emblem (approved 6 June 1952) (Note: The group uses the wing emblem with the group designation on the scroll. Air Force Instruction 84-105, Organizational Lineage, Honors and Heraldry, 19 March 2013, para 3.3.3)

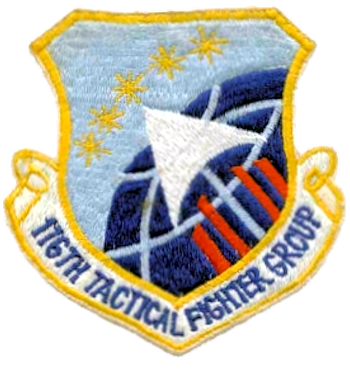
- 116th Tactical Fighter Group emblem

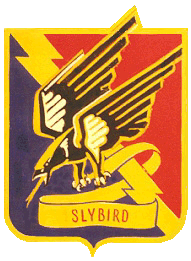
- 353d Fighter Group emblem

The 116th Operations Group is a Georgia Air National Guard unit assigned to the 116th Air Control Wing. The unit is stationed at Robins Air Force Base, Georgia. The 116th Group controls all operational Northrop Grumman E-8C Joint STARS aircraft of the 116th Air Control Wing. It was activated in 1992, when the Air Force implemented the Objective Wing organization, and was successively equipped with the McDonnell Douglas F-15 Eagle and the Rockwell B-1 Lancer before converting to the E-8C in 2002.

The unit was first activated during World War II as the 353d Fighter Group, a Republic P-47 Thunderbolt fighter unit assigned to VIII Fighter Command in Western Europe, which later converted to the North American P-51 Mustang. The group received a Distinguished Unit Citation for its air support during Operation Market Garden, the airborne invasion of the Netherlands.

Postwar, in 1946, the group was redesignated the 116th Fighter Group and became part of the Georgia Air National Guard. In 1950, the group was mobilized for the Korean War as the 116th Fighter-Bomber Group, and was deployed to Japan. In 1952, the group was returned to the Georgia Air National Guard and became the 116th Fighter-Interceptor Group. The group converted to transport aircraft in 1961 and was successively redesignated the 116th Air Transport Group and the 116th Military Airlift Group. After the end of United States involvement in the Vietnam War, the group was converted back to fighters in 1973, but was inactivated a year later.

== History ==
=== World War II ===
The group was organized as the 353d Fighter Group at Mitchel Field, New York, although it did not receive any pilots until it moved to Richmond AAB, Virginia. The group trained in the Mid-Atlantic states during 1942–1943 while also serving as an air defense organization. Its original squadrons were the 350th, 351st, and 352d Fighter Squadrons. The group was equipped with Curtiss P-40N Warhawks that had been used by other units, but in February 1943, it began receiving Republic P-47B Thunderbolts.

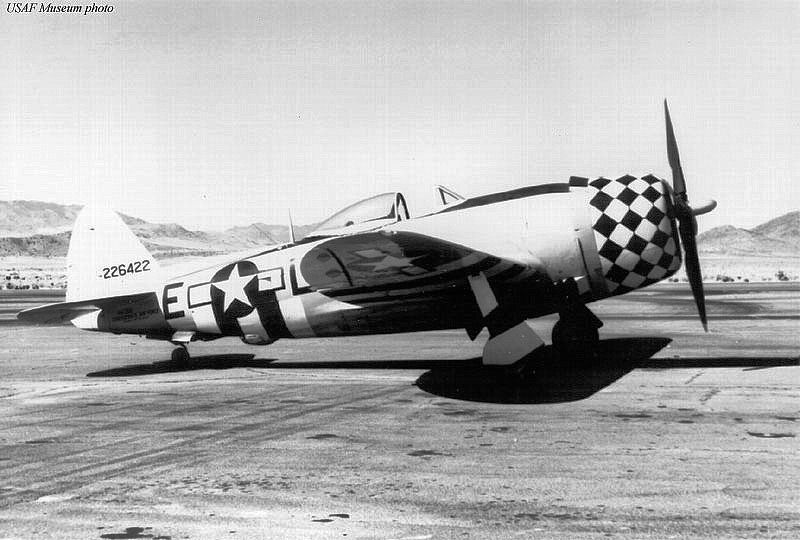
Republic P-47D Thunderbolt (LH-E) of the 350th Fighter Squadron

The 353d moved to England May through June 1943, where it was assigned to the 66th Fighter Wing of VIII Fighter Command at Sawston Hall, Cambridge. The group was equipped with newer P-47D Thunderbolts and was the fourth P-47 unit to join the Eighth Air Force.

Operations commenced on 9 August 1943 when sixteen planes joined P-47s of the 56th Fighter Group on an uneventful fighter sweep over the Netherlands. The group's first mission on its own was a bomber escort mission on 14 August. On the 16th, the group had its first engagement with enemy Bf 109 and Fw 190 fighters. Unfortunately, the first group commander, Lt. Col. Joseph A. Morris was lost in combat that day. From Metfield the 353d flew numerous counter-air missions and provided escort for bombers that attacked targets in western Europe, made counter-air sweeps over France and the Low Countries, and dive bombed targets in France.

In March 1944 the group commander. Col. Duncan, proposed to Maj Gen. Kepner, the commander of VIII Fighter Command, that a group of pilots be assembled who would be specialists in the art of ground strafing. On 15 March sixteen pilots from the 353d, 355th, 359th and 361st Fighter Groups were assembled under Col. Duncan and nicknamed "Bill's Buzz Boys". These pilots flew P-47s equipped with "paddle blade" propellers which improved the low altitude performance of their Thunderbolts. Until "Bill's Buzz Boys" were disbanded on 12 April they developed tactics for low level strafing attacks on enemy airfields, which prevented the Luftwaffe from shepherding their air defense forces on the ground, in order to use them only when they had an advantage, minimizing losses, because the aircraft were vulnerable both in the air and on the ground.

During the Battle of Normandy, the 353d supported the breakthrough at Saint-Lô in July.

The group received the Distinguished Unit Citation for supporting Operation Market Garden, the airborne attack on Arnhem and Nijmegen (Operation Market) and the advance of British Forces to link up with the airhead and attack across the Rhine River (Operation Garden) between 17 and 23 September 1944. On the 17th and 18th the group concentrated on strikes against enemy flak positions threatening the landing of airborne troops, claiming the destruction of 64 flak positions and damage to 22 more in the two days. These attacks also resulted in the loss of two of the group's planes and flak damage to 17 more. After standing down for two days due to weather, the 353d provided top cover to the Douglas C-53 Skytrooper and Douglas C-47 Skytrain aircraft carrying out the operation. While protecting the troop carriers the group claimed 25 victories over enemy fighters attacking the drop and landing zones while losing four more of its P-47s.

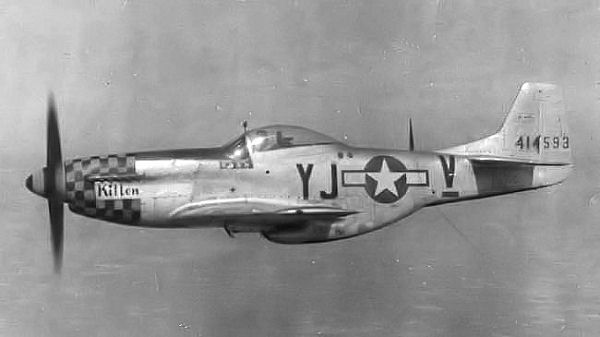
P-51D (YJ-V) of the 351st Fighter Squadron

In October 1944, the group converted to the North American P-51 Mustang. The group flew its first Mustang mission escorting Boeing B-17s on 2 October. This mission was the only one in which the group flew both P-47s and P-51s, although Thunderbolts continued to fly separate missions until the conversion was complete. Four days later Lt. C. W. Mueller claimed Eighth Air Force's second victory over a jet-propelled Me 262 fighter.

About this time Raydon was known colloquially as "Bomb Alley" due to the number of German V-1 "Doodlebug" flying bombs which flew directly overhead on their way to London. One V-1 blew up as it went over and the engine narrowly missed the bomb dump in Raydon Great Wood.

The group continued its fighter-bomber, escort, and counter-air activities, participating in the Battle of the Bulge from December 1944 through January 1945 and Operation Varsity, the airborne attack across the Rhine in March 1945. The group had two "aces in a day" on 24 March when Lt. Col. Wayne Blickenstaff and Maj. Robert Elder each claimed five victories. The group encountered a formation of Fw 190 aircraft loaded with bombs, with another formation of Bf 109s flying top cover for them. The group attacked the enemy formations, claiming a total of 29 destroyed while losing five aircraft. This was the only time in the history of Eighth Air Force when two pilots from the same unit destroyed five or more enemy aircraft in the same engagement.

The 353d's flew its last combat mission (its 448th) on 25 April 1945, when it escorted Royal Air Force and 398th Bombardment Group bombers attacking Berchtesgaden and Pilsen. It had lost 152 aircraft in combat. 50 of the pilots had become prisoners of war or evadees (including group commander, Col. Glenn E. Duncan), but most aircraft losses also involved the loss of the pilot. After the end of hostilities, the group trained and prepared for transfer to the Pacific Theater. With the end of World War II in September, the group left Raydon and transferred back to Camp Kilmer, New Jersey where it was inactivated on 18 October 1945.

After VE day in May 1945, Colonel Glen E. Duncan received a B-17 Flying Fortress from school friend Colonel John B Kidd from the 100th Bomb Group in return for Kidd flying a P-47 Thunderbolt. The B-17 was painted in the 353rd colors (yellow/black checkerboard cowls) and used to fly ground crewmembers over Germany so that they could observe the impact their aircraft had made in the war.

==== Aerial Victories ====
Aerial Victories by the 353d Ftr Gp

Aerial Victories	Number	Note
Group Hq	31
350th Fighter Squadron	113.5
351st Fighter Squadron	101
352d Fighter Squadron	87
Group Total	332.5

Aces of the 353d Ftr Gp

Name and Rank	Number of Aircraft Destroyed	Note
Col. Glenn E. Duncan	19.5	(Note: During World War II, Eighth Air Force also credited pilots with aircraft destroyed on the ground. Col Duncan, Lt Col Gallup, Maj Elder, Capt Compton, Capt Hartley, Capt Maguire, Capt Poindexter, Capt Tanner, Capt Tordoff, and Lt Auchincloss were credited with additional aircraft destroyed on the ground. Twenty-five other group pilots would be considered aces if their credits for aircraft destroyed on the ground were included.)
Maj. Walter C. Beckham	18
Lt. Col. Wayne K. Blickenstaff	10
Lt. Col. Kenneth W. Gallup	9
Maj. Robert A. Elder	9
Capt. James N. Poindexter	7
Capt. William A. Maguire	7
Lt. Arthur C. Cundy	6
Capt. Gordon B. Compton	5.5
Lt. Jesse W. Gonnam	5.5
Capt. Robert W. Abernathy	5
Capt. Raymond B. Hartley	5
Capt. Gene E. Markham	5
Capt. William F. Tanner	5
Capt. Harrison B. Tordoff	5
Lt. Bayard C. Auchincloss	5

==== Aircraft Markings ====
- P-47s Yellow and black diamonds on the cowling.
- P-51s Spinners striped alternately yellow and black. Three rows of yellow and black checks on cowlings (expanded to eight rows in 1945).

350th Fighter Squadron LH, yellow rudders
351st Fighter Squadron YJ, plain rudders
352d Fighter Squadron SX, black rudders

=== Georgia Air National Guard ===
The wartime 353d Fighter Group was redesignated as the 116th Fighter Group, allotted to the National Guard on 24 May 1946. It was organized at Marietta Army Air Field, Georgia, and was extended federal recognition on 20 August 1946 by the National Guard Bureau. The 116th Fighter Group was entitled to the history, honors, and colors of the 353d Fighter Group. It was assigned to the 54th Fighter Wing.

The 116th Fighter Group consisted of the 128th Fighter Squadron at Marietta AAF, and the 158th Fighter Squadron at Chatham Army Air Field, near Savannah. As part of the Continental Air Command Fourteenth Air Force, the unit trained for tactical fighter missions and air-to-air combat.

=== Korean Mobilization ===
In October 1950, the group was mobilized and moved to George Air Force Base. Under the regular Air Force's wing base organization the 116th Fighter-Bomber Wing was activated as the headquarters for the group and the units supporting it. The 128th Fighter-Bomber Squadron remained with the group after mobilization, but its other units were the 159th Fighter-Bomber Squadron of the Florida Air National Guard and the 196th Fighter-Bomber Squadron of the California Air National Guard.

=== Return to the Georgia Air National Guard ===
The group was redesignated the 116th Fighter-Interceptor Group, returned to the Georgia Air National Guard on 10 July 1952 and activated at Dobbins Air Force Base. The 116th was gained by Air Defense Command (ADC). It was initially equipped with old North American P-51H Mustangs, but soon converted to Republic F-84 Thunderjets. In 1958, the group began to stand alert with its interceptors. In 1960 the F-84s were replaced by the North American F-86L Sabre.

In 1961, the group traded in its Sabres for Boeing C-97 Stratofreighter transports, becoming the 116th Air Transport Group. The group flew long-distance transport missions in support of Air Force requirements, frequently sending aircraft to the Caribbean, Europe, Greenland, and the Middle East. In 1966 the 116th, now the 116th Military Airlift Group, was the first Air National Guard group to receive Douglas C-124 Globemaster II strategic heavy airlifters.

In the years after the Vietnam War, the 116th returned to the fighter mission and was re-equipped with North American F-100 Super Sabre. In 1974 the Air National Guard eliminated its tactical groups at locations that also had a wing headquarters and the 116th Tactical Fighter Group was inactivated on 9 December.

In 1992 as part of the post Cold War reorganizations of the Air Force, the 116th Wing converted to the Air Force Objective Wing organization and the group was again activated as the 116th Operations Group.

After calling Dobbins home for 50 years, the 116th simultaneously converted from the McDonnell Douglas F-15 Eagle fighters to the Rockwell B-1 Lancer strategic bomber and moved 110 miles south to Robins Air Force Base near Warner Robins, Georgia and the former Strategic Air Command alert facility there.

Under the Air Force's Total Force Initiative the 116th Wing became a "blended" wing. The 93d Air Control Wing, an active-duty unit, was inactivated on 1 October 2002 and the 116th Group was assigned both members of the Guard and active duty airmen. The unit was equipped with the new E-8C Joint STARS airborne battle management aircraft.

On 24 November 2010, the Chief of Staff of the Air Force designated the 116th Air Control Wing as an "Active Associate" wing and replaced the "blended" wing concept. A new active duty associate wing was formed, and the squadrons with active duty airmen were reassigned to the 461st Air Control Wing. The two units continue to operate together to accomplish the shared J-STARS mission.

== Lineage ==
- Constituted as the 353d Fighter Group on 29 September 1942

Activated on 1 October 1942
Inactivated on 18 October 1945

- Redesignated 116th Fighter Group and allotted to the National Guard on 24 May 1946

Organized on 8 July 1946
Extended federal recognition on 9 September 1946
Federalized and placed on active duty on 10 October 1950
Redesignated 116th Fighter-Bomber Group on 25 October 1950
Inactivated on 10 July 1952
Redesignated 116th Fighter-Interceptor Group and returned to the Air National Guard on 10 July 1952
Redesignated 116th Fighter-Bomber Group on 1 December 1952
Redesignated 116th Fighter-Interceptor Group on 1 July 1955
Redesignated 116th Fighter Group (Air Defense) on 15 April 1956
Redesignated 116th Air Transport Group on 1 April 1961
Redesignated 116th Military Airlift Group on 1 January 1966
Redesignated 116th Tactical Fighter Group on 4 April 1973
Inactivated on 10 December 1974
Redesignated 116th Operations Group
Activated c. 1 January 1993

=== Assignments ===
- I Fighter Command, 1 October 1942 – 27 May 1943 (attached to Philadelphia Fighter Wing, c. 26 October 1942 – c. 27 May 1943)
- VIII Fighter Command, 7 June 1943
- 66th Fighter Wing, 18 August 1943 (attached to 3d Bombardment Division (later 3d Air Division), 15 September 1943 – 10 October 1945
- Army Service Forces, Port of Embarkation, 16 – 18 October 1945
- 54th Fighter Wing, 9 September 1946
- Tactical Air Command, 10 October 1950
- 116th Fighter-Bomber Wing, Provisional, October 1950
- 116th Fighter-Bomber Wing, 1 November 1950 – 10 July 1952
- 116th Fighter-Interceptor Wing (later 116th Fighter-Bomber Wing, 116th Fighter-Interceptor Wing, 116th Air Transport Wing, 116th Military Airlift Wing, 116th Tactical Fighter Wing, 10 July 1952 – 9 December 1974
- 116th Air Control Wing, 1 January 1993 – present

=== Components ===
- 12th Airborne Command and Control Squadron, 1 October 2002 – 1 October 2011
- 16th Airborne Command and Control Squadron, 1 October 2002 – 1 October 2011
- 128th Fighter Squadron (later 128th Fighter-Interceptor Squadron, 128th Fighter-Bomber Squadron, 128th Air Transport Squadron, 128th Military Airlift Squadron, 128th Tactical Fighter Squadron, 128th Bomb Squadron, 128th Airborne Command and Control Squadron), 9 September 1946 – 1 November 1950, 10 July 1952 – 9 December 1974, 15 March 1992 – present
- 157th Fighter Squadron (see 350th Fighter Squadron)
- 158th Fighter Squadron (see 351st Fighter Squadron)
- 159th Fighter-Bomber Squadron (see 352d Fighter Squadron)
- 196th Fighter-Bomber Squadron 10 October 1950 – 10 July 1952
- 350th Fighter Squadron (later 157th Fighter Squadron), 1 October 1942 – 18 October 1945, 28 November 1946 – 1948
- 351st Fighter Squadron (later 158th Fighter Squadron, 158th Fighter-Interceptor Squadron, 158th Fighter-Bomber Squadron, 158th Fighter-Interceptor Squadron), 1 October 1942 – 18 October 1945, 9 September 1946 – 10 July 1952, 10 July 1952 – 10 July 1958
- 352d Fighter Squadron (later 159th Fighter-Bomber Squadron. 159th Fighter-Interceptor Squadron, 159th Fighter-Bomber Squadron, 159th Fighter-Interceptor Squadron), 1 October 1942 – 18 October 1945 10 October 1950 – 20 July 1952, 20 July 1952 – 30 June 1956

=== Stations ===
- Mitchel Field, New York, 1 October 1942
- Richmond Army Air Base, Virginia, c. 7 October 1942
- Baltimore Municipal Airport, Maryland, c. 26 October 1942 – c. 27 May 1943
- RAF Goxhill (AAF-345), England, June 1943
- RAF Metfield (AAF-366), England, 3 August 1943
- RAF Raydon (AAF-157), England, April 1944 – October 1945
- Camp Kilmer, New Jersey, c. 16–18 October 1945
- Marietta Army Air Field (later Marietta Air Force Base, Dobbins Air Force Base), Georgia, 9 September 1946
- George Air Force Base, California, 1 November 1950 – 10 July 1952
- Misawa Air Base, Japan, 1 August 1951 – 10 July 1952 (operated from Taegu Air Base (K-2), South Korea, 2 December 1950 – 4 January 1952; 26 May 1952 – 10 July 1952)
- Dobbins Air Force Base, Georgia, 10 July 1952 – 9 December 1974
- Dobbins Air Reserve Base, Georgia, 1 January 1993
- Robins Air Force Base, Georgia, 1 April 1996 – 1 October 2011
- Robins Air Force Base, Georgia, 1 October 2011 – present

=== Aircraft ===
- P-40 Warhawk, 1942–1943
- P-47D Thunderbolt, July 1943 – 10 November 1944
- P-51D Mustang, 2 October 1944
- P-51K Mustang, December 1944 – October 1945
- F-47N Thunderbolt, 1946–1950
- F-84G Thunderjet, 1950–1952
- F-51H Mustang, 1952
- F-84D Thunderjet, 1952–1955
- F-84F Thunderstreak, 1955–1960
- F-86L Sabre, 1960–1961
- C-97F Stratofreighter, 1961–1965
- C-124C Globemaster II, 1965–1973
- F-100D Super Sabre, 1973–1974
- F-15A Eagle, 1986–1996
- B-1B Lancer, 1996–2002
- E-8C Joint STARS, 2002–present.

== See also ==
- List of groups and wings of the United States Air National Guard
- List of United States Air National Guard squadrons
- List of B-1 units of the United States Air Force
- List of F-100 units of the United States Air Force
