= 196th Attack Squadron =

Unit of the California Air National Guard

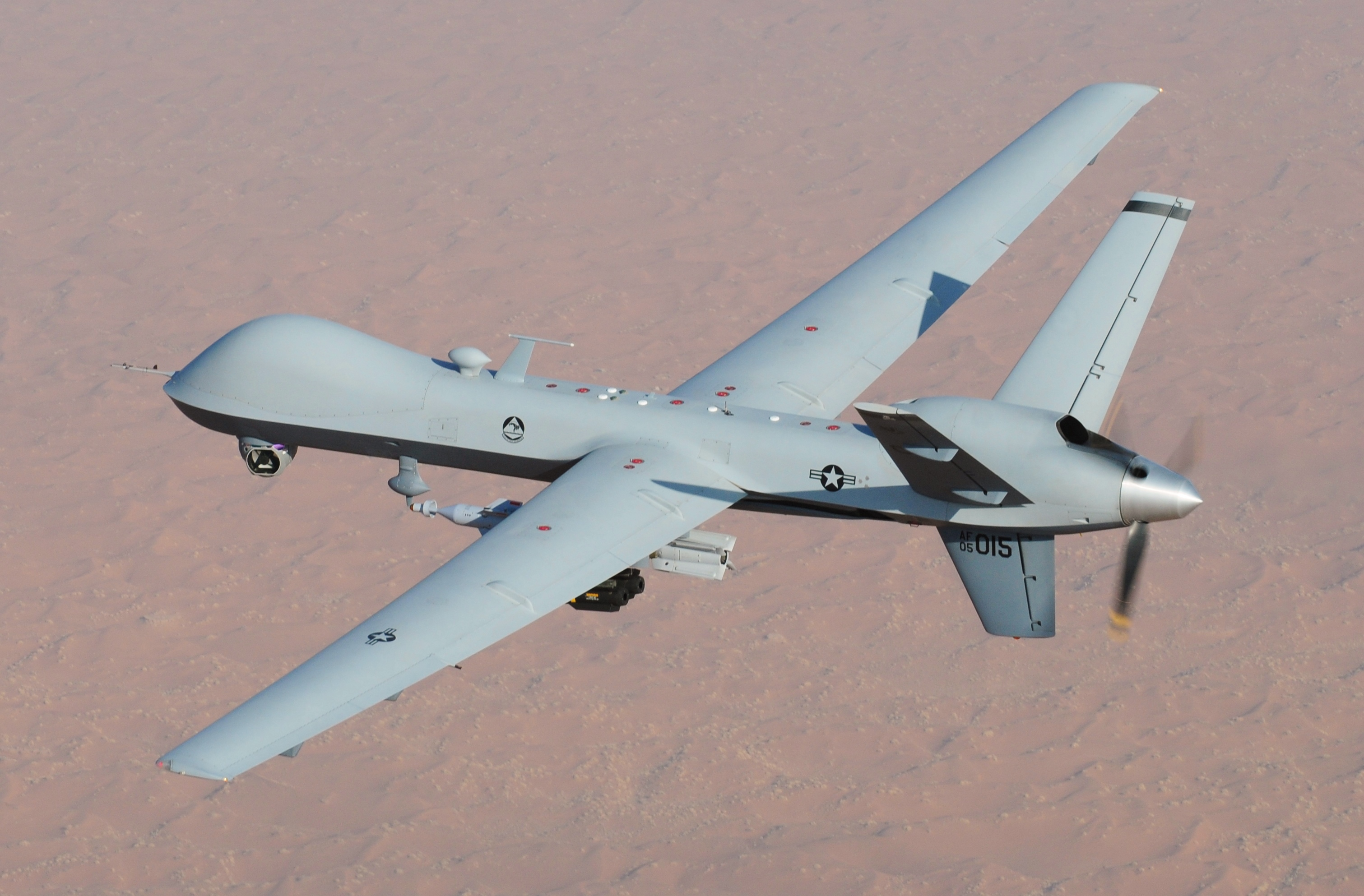
- U.S. Air Force MQ-9A Reaper
- Active: 1943–1945; 1946–1952; 1952–present
- Country: United States
- Allegiance: California
- Branch: Air National Guard
- Type: Squadron
- Role: Attack
- Part of: California Air National Guard
- Garrison/HQ: March Joint Air Reserve Base, California
- Nickname: Grizzlies
- Engagements: World War II
- Decorations: Air Force Outstanding Unit Award

Insignia
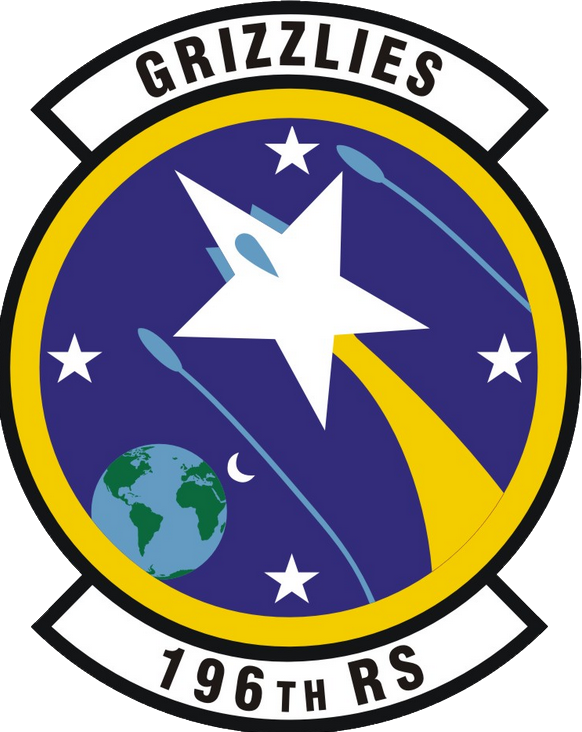
- 196th Attack Squadron emblem (Note: Meaning: Ultramarine blue and Air Force yellow are the Air Force colors. Blue alludes to the sky, the primary theater of Air Force operations. Yellow refers to the sun and the excellence required of Air Force personnel. The stars represent all directions within air space. The shooting star over the globe symbolizes air defense of the world and throughout the skies.)
- Tail code: CA

The 196th Attack Squadron is a unit of the 163d Attack Wing of the California Air National Guard stationed at March Joint Air Reserve Base, California, operating the MQ-9 Reaper remotely piloted aircraft.

== Mission ==
The 196th's primary mission is to train and equip its members to operate an MQ-9 Reaper aircraft anywhere in the world. Members of the 196 ATKS maintain a high level of vigilance and proficiency as MQ-9 Reaper crew members; ready at a moment's notice to go wherever they are needed. When not training to operate MQ-9 Reapers in combat, the 196th supports domestic operations for the State of California, such as locating missing hikers or fighting fires with CAL FIRE. The 196th has assisted CAL FIRE with containing some of the state's worst fires including the Thomas Fire, SCU Lightning Complex, and LNU Lightning Complex.

In November 2006, the squadron's parent wing, formerly the 163rd Air Refueling Wing, was redesignated the 163rd Reconnaissance Wing (163 RW) and the wing and squadron's mobilization gaining command was changed from Air Mobility Command to Air Combat Command. As the wing's operational squadron, the 196 RS was the first Air National Guard unit to receive the MQ-1 Predator and was the first to become a fully functional ANG Flying Training Unit (FTU) and Field Training Detachment for the Predator. The FTU trains pilots and sensor operators for ACC, and trains enlisted personnel to assemble, disassemble, maintain and repair the Predator for Air Education and Training Command (AETC).

== History ==
=== World War II ===
The squadron was formed at Westover Field, Massachusetts, in August 1943 as the 411th Fighter Squadron, one of three squadrons of the 373d Fighter Group. During World War II the 411th was assigned to the European Theater of Operations, Ninth Air Force in Western Europe. It was equipped with Republic P-47 Thunderbolts.

The unit flew its first combat mission on 8 May 1944, a fighter sweep over Normandy. It then took part in pre-invasion activities, escorting Martin B-26 Marauders to attack airdromes, bridges, and railroads in Occupied France. The squadron patrolled the air over the beachhead when the Allies launched the Normandy invasion on 6 June 1944, and hit troops, tanks, roads, fuel depots and other targets in the assault area until the end of the month.

The squadron moved to the European Continent in July 1944 where it struck railroads, hangars, boxcars, warehouses, and other objectives to prevent reinforcements from reaching the front at St. Lo, where the Allies broke through on 25 July 1944. The squadron bombed such targets as troops in the Falaise-Argentan area in August 1944. During the Battle of the Bulge, from December 1944 to January 1945, the 411th concentrated on the destruction of bridges, marshalling yards, and highways. It also flew reconnaissance missions to support ground operations in the Rhine Valley in March 1945, hitting airfields, motor transport, etc. The squadron continued tactical air operations until 4 May 1945.

The 411th returned to the United States and prepared for transfer to the Pacific Theater during the Summer of 1945. The Japanese capitulation in August led to the squadron's inactivation in November 1945.

=== California Air National Guard ===
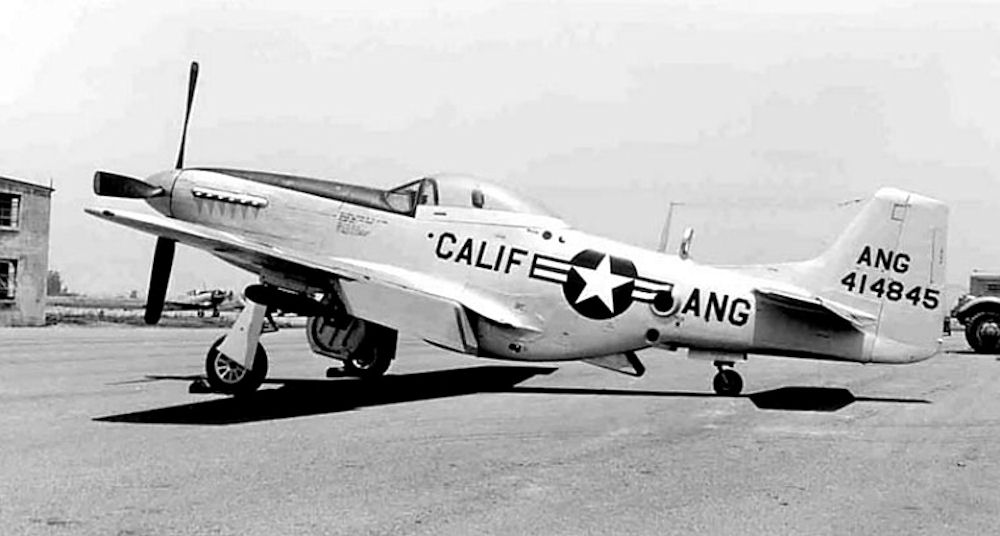
196th Fighter Squadron – North American P-51D-10-NA Mustang 44-14845, 1947

The 411th Squadron was allotted to the National Guard on 24 May 1946 and redesignated the 196th Fighter Squadron. It was organized at Norton Air Force Base, California, on 12 September 1946 and federally recognized on 9 November 1946. The squadron was equipped with P-51D Mustangs and assigned to the 146th Fighter Group, at Van Nuys Airport.

The squadron trained for tactical fighter missions and air-to-air combat under the supervision of Fourth Air Force. In June 1948, the unit received 25 F-80C Shooting Star aircraft. The 196th was one of the first Air National Guard units to receive these new jets.

==== Combat in Korean War ====
The 196th was federalized on 10 October 1950 due to the Korean War. It was briefly assigned to the Fourth Air Force, which moved the squadron to George Air Force Base, California, and assigned it to the 116th Fighter Group On 11 November, the 196th squadron and 116th were redesignated fighter-bomber units and became part of Tactical Air Command. The group's other operational squadrons were the 128th Fighter Squadron of the Georgia Air National Guard and the 159th Fighter Squadron of the Florida Air National Guard.

At George the three fighter squadrons were equipped with Lockheed F-80Cs and began operational training. After losing many of their F-80 pilots who were assigned to Far East Air Forces (FEAF) as replacements, all three squadrons were forced to transfer pilots among themselves to maintain a balance of qualified pilots in each unit. As a result, they lost their character as squadrons of the Georgia, Florida and California ANGs. In April 1951 the 116th Fighter-Bomber Group (116 FBG) began receiving brand new F-84E Thunderjets directly from Republic Aviation. On 14 May the 116th Fighter-Bomber Wing (116 FBW) (Note: Under the Hobson Plan the 116th Wing included the 116th Air Base Group, 116th Maintenance and Supply Group, and 116th Medical Group in addition to the 116 Fighter-Bomber Group, which was its operational element.) received a Warning Order for an impending transfer, and they expected to be transferred to Europe. With a Readiness Date of 25 June, the 116 FBW was ready to move, and by 1 July it had sent its seventy-five F-84Es to the New York Port of Embarkation for shipment to France. However, two days later the wing received orders transferring them to Japan. Fifty-four F-84Es had to be obtained from Bergstrom AFB, Texas, and Langley Air Force Base, Virginia, as partial replacements for the Thunderjets sent east.

The 196th FBS departed from San Diego on 10 July on the USS Sitkoh Bay. The 116th FBG with the 158th and 159th FBS's departed from San Diego on the transport aircraft carrier USS Windham Bay two days later. The USAF, having learned from expensive previous experience with open air transportation of F-84s on an aircraft carrier deck, heavily protected their F-84s with cosmoline and tarpaulins. The wing off-loaded at Yokosuka Naval Base, Japan, between 24 and 27 July, with their aircraft being barged to Kisarazu, Japan, for cleaning and preparation for flight. Despite the care taken, thirty-three F-84s suffered some degree of salt damage.

The 196th was established at Chitose Air Base, Japan, while the other squadrons of the group were sent to Misawa Air Base, Japan. The squadrons' initial role was to augment Japanese air defenses, and operational training began on 6 August. The 116th FBW remained on duty in Japan into the fall of 1951. During this period they concentrated on providing air-to-ground support to Army units training in Japan as well as assisting in providing air defense for northern Japan. The 116 FBG began rotating squadrons to Korea in early December.

The 196th FBS started for Taegu Air Base (K-2) on 26 December for their turn in combat, but did not get there until 28 December because of weather problems. The 196th FBS flew missions from K-2 until 3 January 1952, mostly close air support, with a 70% accuracy, and returned to Japan on 4 January 1952. The 116th FBG returned to combat on 26 May 1952. The first mission was with sixteen F-84Es that flew from Misawa to Chitose AB for a pilot briefing, and then after arming with 500-pound general-purpose bombs, they took off for an attack against Sariwon, in southwestern North Korea. The F-84s were refueled en route by KB-29 Superfortress tankers near Taegu, South Korea, upon their return from the target, which gave any aircraft unable to be refueled an alternate landing spot. After refueling the mission landed at Johnson Air Base, Japan, and resumed the air defense mission.

On 10 June 1952 the 116th FBW was relieved from assignment to Tactical Air Command and reassigned to Far East Air Force without personnel. The Guardsmen remaining in the wing were returned to the United States, while the equipment and regular personnel of the Wing were transferred to the regular 474th Fighter-Bomber Wing.

=== Air Defense ===
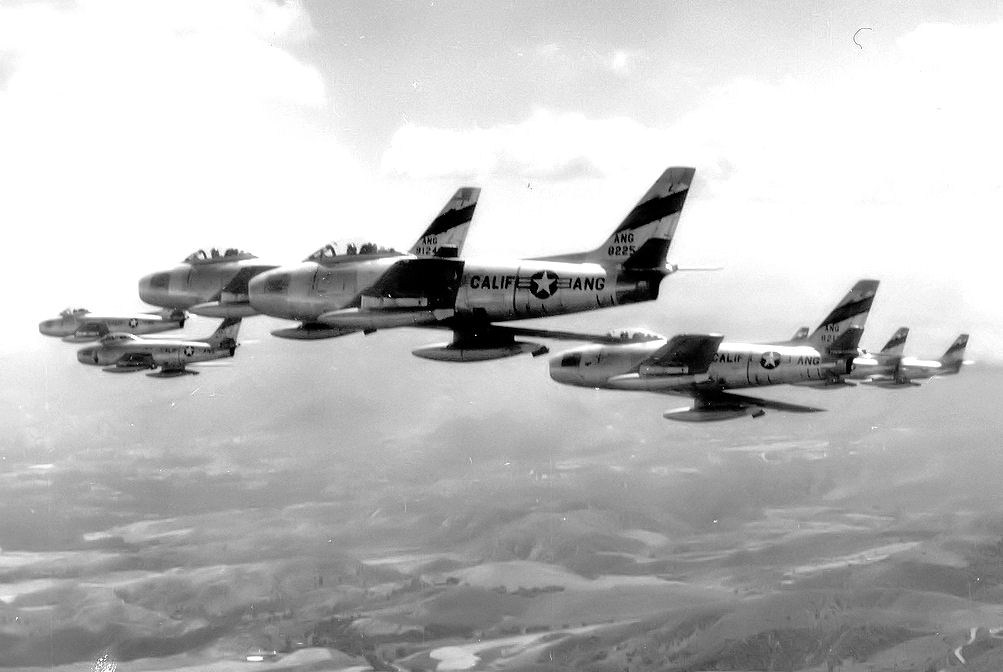
196th FIS F-86As in formation, 1954

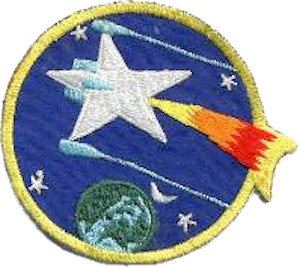
196th Fighter-Interceptor Squadron emblem

The squadron was reorganized at Norton the same day it was relieved from active duty, although it took until January 1953 before it re-equipped with the long-range F-51H Mustang and operationally-gained by TAC.

The squadron moved from Norton AFB to Ontario Municipal Airport, California, on 1 January 1954. In February 1954, it was equipped with North American F-86A Sabre. By July 1955 the transition from the F-51H Mustang to the F-86A Sabre was complete. The squadron was redesignated a fighter interceptor unit with an air defense mission for the Los Angeles area and its mobilization command became Air Defense Command (ADC). With the F-86A, the squadrons began standing dusk-to-dawn alerts, joining its ADC active-duty counterparts. The squadron received newer F-86F Sabres in 1957.

On 17 May 1958, the 196th was authorized to expand to a group level, and the 163d Fighter Group was established as its headquarters. The 196th FIS was the group's flying squadron, while the 163d Material Squadron, 163d Air Base Squadron, and the 163d USAF Dispensary were activated to support the 196th.

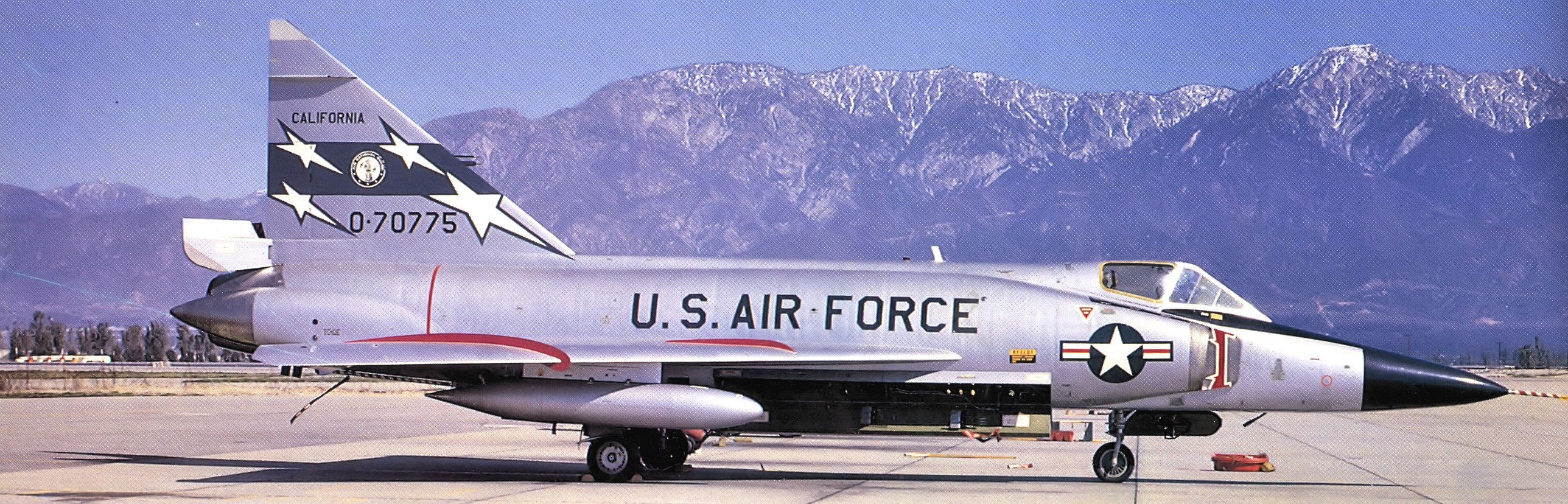
California Air National Guard 196th FIS Convair F-102A Delta Dagger in 1970 (Note: This aircraft is now on static display at Clovis Park, California.)

ADC upgraded the squadron to F-86H Sabre day interceptors in 1959 and Convair F-102 Delta Daggers in 1965. The F-102 was being phased out of active-duty units in the early 1960s and the 196th was one of the last ANG units to replace their F-86 Sabres. The F-102 aircraft, however, was obsolescent as an interceptor by the time it was received by the 196th. The Delta Daggers soldiered on until the early 1970s when they were retired to the Military Aircraft Storage and Disposition Center at Davis-Monthan Air Force Base.

The unit received two Air Force Outstanding Unit Awards for extended periods ending in 1964 and 1974.

=== Tactical Air Command ===
On 8 March 1975, the unit again assumed a new mission and was again aligned under TAC as the 196th Tactical Air Support Squadron. The 196th received the Cessna 0-2A/B "Super Skymaster" to accomplish its new role.

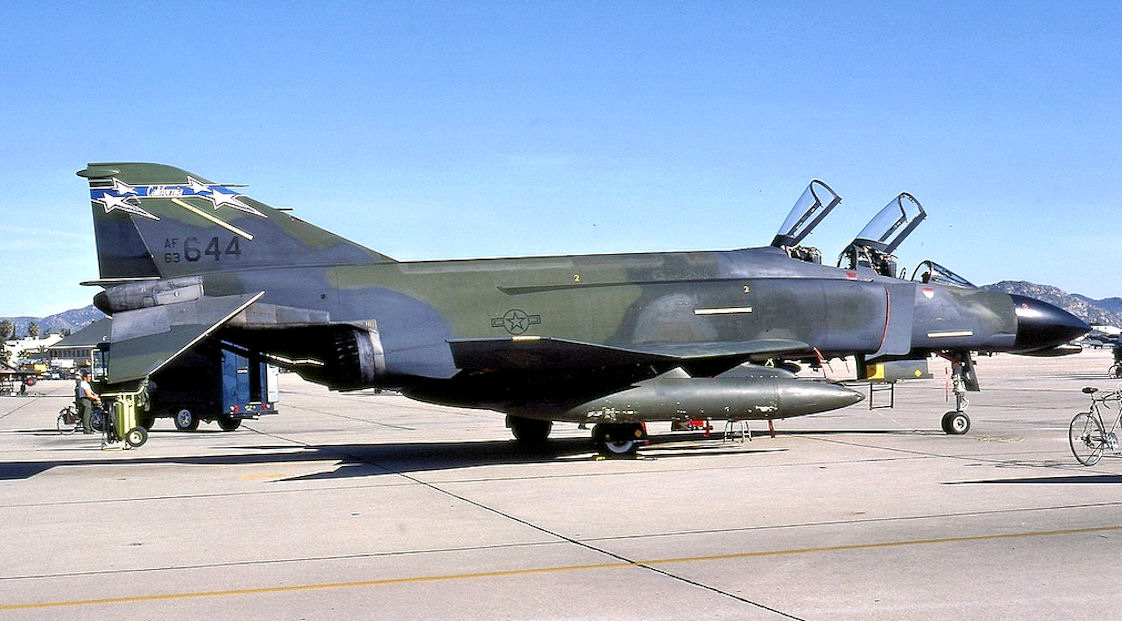
196th TFS F-4C 63-7644 about 1987 (Note: This was the type of aircraft Capt. Dean Paul Martin was flying when he crashed.)

In October 1982, the 163d again assumed a tactical fighter role and converted to the McDonnell Douglas F-4C Phantom II and moved to March Air Force Base, near Riverside, into new facilities built for the unit. The 163d transitioned to the upgraded F-4E on 1 April 1987. This newer aircraft incorporated more sophisticated electronics and weaponry.

On 21 March 1987, Captain Dean Paul Martin (son of entertainer Dean Martin), a pilot in the squadron, crashed his F-4C into San Gorgonio Mountain, California, shortly after departure from March AFB. Both Martin and his weapons system officer (WSO) were killed.

In July 1990, the unit again changed missions and was redesignated the 196th Tactical Reconnaissance Squadron. The 196th was equipped with RF-4C Phantom II unarmed reconnaissance aircraft and maintained a dual state/federal mission. The unit's primary mission was to provide tactical reconnaissance to friendly forces. The unit was also actively involved in statewide missions. This was accomplished by using a system of visual, optical, electronic, and other sensory devices. During this time the aircrews accumulated over 30,000 hours of flying time and the unit deployed across both the Pacific and Atlantic Oceans.

The 163d deployed to Pisa Airport, Italy, in support of Operation Decisive Endeavor. During that period the unit also flew as the lead unit in support of flight operations over Bosnia.

=== Air Refueling ===
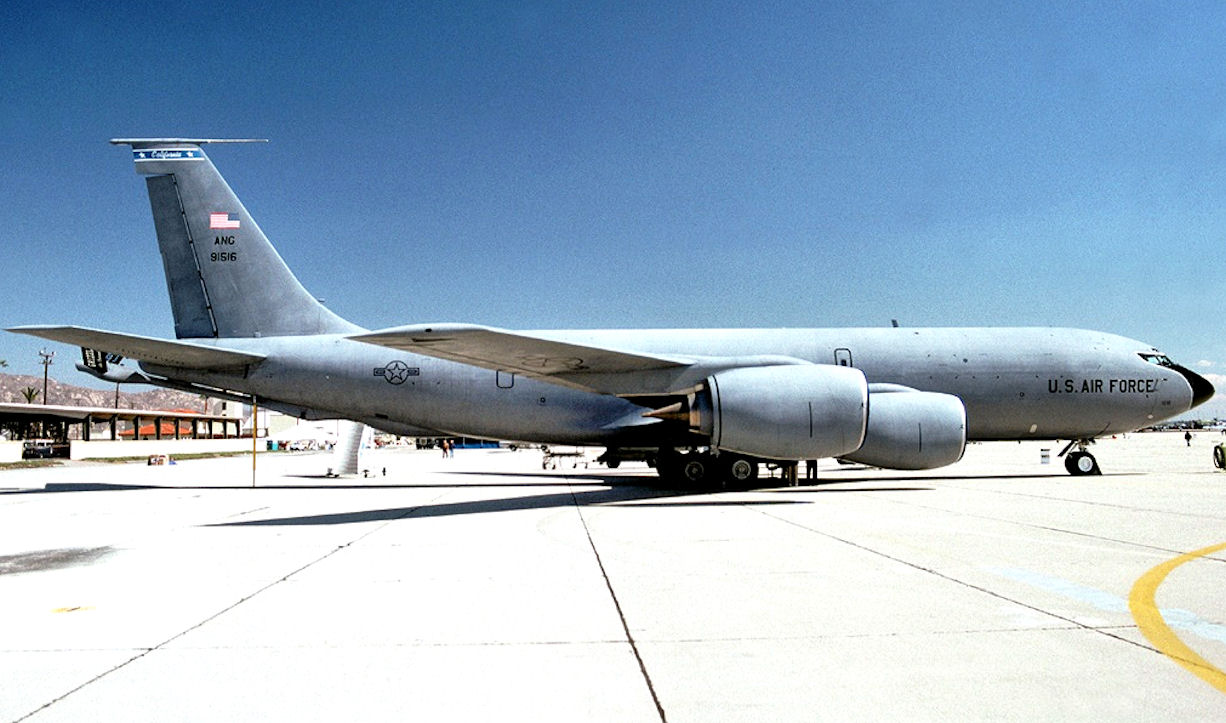
196th Air Refueling Squadron KC-135

196th ARS Emblem

After the end of Operation Desert Storm in 1991, the phaseout of the RF-4C Phantom II from the Air National Guard was accelerated. In 1993, the 196th became the 196th Air Refueling Squadron and was equipped with Boeing KC-135 Stratotankers, and its mobilization gaining command became Air Mobility Command.

On 1 April 1996, as a result of 1995 Base Realignment and Closure Commission, March was transferred to the Air Force Reserve Command and realigned as March Air Reserve Base, with the 196th and its parent wing remaining at March as an Air National Guard tenant command.

In 1999 the 196th deployed KC-135R aircraft in support of Operation Allied Force. The unit flew combat missions around-the-clock refueling NATO aircraft, including complex night formation sorties with the F-117A. 1999 also saw the squadron's Pacer Crag conversion. This extensive aircraft modernization project required intensive aircrew training and is expected to extend the life of the 40-year-old Boeing jet beyond the year 2020.

The 196th Air Refueling Squadron was recognized in 1999 and earned an Air Force Outstanding Unit Award for the fourth time. The award covers a period during which the unit personnel and aircraft deployed to Pisa Airport, Italy to support Operation Decisive Endeavor and also flew as the lead unit in support of flight operations over Bosnia. The 163d Operations Support Flight, 163d Logistics Group, 163d Logistics Squadron, and the 196th Air Refueling Squadron all earned the Governor's Outstanding Unit Citation as well.

The 19th supported NATO's Operation Joint Forge while deployed to Istres Air Base, France, from 31 October through 3 December 2000. Under Air Expeditionary Force 9, the Grizzlies also sent personnel to Kuwait, Germany, France, Saudi Arabia and Turkey from October through December 2000.

=== Unmanned Aerial Vehicle operations ===
In 2007 the Air National Guard stood up the first of several units that will operate the MQ-1 Predator armed unmanned reconnaissance aircraft. During a ceremony on 28 November at March Air Reserve Base in southern California, the 196th Air Refueling Squadron officially became the 196th Reconnaissance Squadron, taking on the Predator mission in place of operating KC-135R Stratotanker air refueling aircraft. The wing's last KC-135R tanker left in April 2008. The Wing was the first Air National Guard unit to receive the MQ-1 Predator and was the first to become a fully functional ANG Flying Training Unit (FTU) and Field Training Detachment (FTD) for the Predator.

The squadron was recently redesignated as the 196th Attack Squadron in keeping with the parent wing's recent redesignation as the 163d Attack Wing.

== Lineage ==
- Constituted as 411th Fighter Squadron, Single Engine on 25 May 1943

Activated on 15 August 1943
Inactivated on 7 November 1945.

- Redesignated 196th Fighter Squadron, Single Engine and allotted to the ANG on 24 May 1946.
- Organized on 12 September 1946

Extended federal recognition on 9 November 1946
Redesignated 196th Fighter Squadron, Jet on 1 June 1948
Federalized and placed on active duty on 10 October 1950
Redesignated 196th Fighter-Bomber Squadron on 1 November 1950
Inactivated, released from active duty and returned to California state control on 10 July 1952
Redesignated 196th Fighter-Interceptor Squadron on 1 October 1952
Redesignated 196th Fighter-Bomber Squadron on 1 January 1953
Redesignated 196th Fighter-Interceptor Squadron on 1 October 1965
Redesignated 196th Tactical Air Support Squadron on 8 March 1975
Redesignated 196th Tactical Fighter Squadron on 1 October 1982
Redesignated 196th Tactical Reconnaissance Squadron on 1 July 1990
Redesignated 196th Reconnaissance Squadron on 16 March 1992
Redesignated 196th Air Refueling Squadron on 1 October 1993
Redesignated 196th Reconnaissance Squadron on 1 November 2006
Redesignated 196th Attack Squadron, c. 2016

=== Assignments ===
- 373d Fighter Group, 15 August 1943 – 7 November 1945
- 146th Fighter Group (later 146th Composite Group), 9 November 1946
- 116th Fighter-Bomber Group, 10 October 1950
- 144th Fighter-Bomber Group (later 144th Fighter-Interceptor Group), 10 July 1952 (not manned or equipped)
- 146th Fighter-Bomber Group (later 146th Fighter-Interceptor Group), 1 January 1953
- 163d Fighter Group (Air Defense) (later 163d Fighter-Interceptor Group, 163d Tactical Air Support Group, 163d Tactical Fighter Group, 163d Tactical Reconnaissance Group, 163d Reconnaissance Group, 163d Air Refueling Group), 17 May 1958
- 163d Operations Group, 1 October 1995 – present

=== Stations ===
- Westover Field, Massachusetts, 15 August 1943
- Norfolk Airport, Virginia, 23 October 1943
- Richmond Army Air Base, Virginia, 15 February – 15 March 1944
- RAF Woodchurch (AAF-419), England, 4 April – 4 July 1944
- Tour-en-Bessin Airfield (A-13), France, 19 July 1944
- Saint James Airfield (A-29), France, 19 August 1944
- Reims/Champagne Airfield (A-62), France, 19 September 1944
- Le Culot Airfield (A-89), Belgium, 22 October 1944
- Venlo Airfield (Y-55), Netherlands, 11 March 1945
- Lippstadt Airfield (Y-98), Germany, 20 April 1945
- AAF Station Illesheim, Germany, 20 May – July 1945
- Sioux Falls Army Air Field, South Dakota, 4 August 1945
- Seymour Johnson Field, North Carolina, 20 August 1945
- Mitchel Field, New York, 28 September – 7 November 1945
- Norton Air Force Base, California, 9 November 1946
- George Air Force Base, California, 1 November 1950 – 10 July 1952
- Misawa Air Base, Japan, 1 August 1951 – 10 July 1952 (operated from Taegu Air Base (K-2), South Korea, 2 December 1950 – 4 January 1952; 26 May 1952 – 10 July 1952)
- Ontario Municipal Airport, California, 1 January 1954
- March Air Force Base (later March Air Reserve Base), California, 1 October 1982 – present

=== Aircraft ===
- P-47D Thunderbolt, 1943–1945
- F-51D Mustang, 1947–1948
- F-80C Shooting Star, 1948–1950
- F-51D Mustang, 1950
- F-84G Thunderjet, 1950–1952
- F-51H Mustang, 1953–1954
- F-86A Sabre, 1954–1957
- F-86F Sabre, 1957–1959
- F-86H Sabre, 1959–1965
- F-102 Delta Dagger, 1965–1975
- O-2 Skymaster, 1975–1982
- F-4C Phantom, 1982–1987
- F-4E Phantom, 1987–1990
- RF-4C Phantom II, 1990–1993
- KC-135E Stratotanker, 1993–2002
- KC-135R Stratotanker, 2002–2006
- MQ-1 Predator, 2007 – 2014
- MQ-9 Reaper, 2014 – present
