= Philadelphia Fighter Wing =

- Active: 1942–1946
- Country: United States
- Branch: United States Army Air Force
- Role: Air defense and training fighter units
- Engagements: World War II

Commanders
- Notable commanders: Brigadier General Glenn O. Barcus

The Philadelphia Fighter Wing is an inactive United States Air Force unit. Its last assignment was with the I Fighter Command, stationed at Philadelphia Airport, Pennsylvania, where it was inactivated on 3 April 1946.

== History ==
The wing was a World War II air defense organization, reporting to First Air Force, responsible for the air defense of the Philadelphia area. The wing was also a training organization for fighter groups and personnel, with assigned groups subsequently deploying to overseas theaters. Not manned after July 1944, and inactivated at the end of the war.

== Lineage ==
- Constituted as the Philadelphia Air Defense Wing on 6 August 1942

Activated on 11 August 1942
Redesignated Philadelphia Fighter Wing c. 2 July 1943
Inactivated on 3 April 1946
Disbanded on 8 October 1948

=== Assignments ===
- I Fighter Command, 11 August 1942 – 3 April 1946

=== Components ===
- 33d Fighter Group: 11 August – November 1942
- 58th Fighter Group: 24 October 1942 – c. 3 March 1943
- 83d Fighter Group: 22 November 1943 – 10 April 1944
- 87th Fighter Group: 1943 (dates undetermined)
- 324th Fighter Group: 6 July – 8 October 1942
- 327th Fighter Group: 27 August – 22 September 1942
- 353d Fighter Group: c. 26 October 1942 – c. 27 May 1943
- 355th Fighter Group: 4 March – 16 June 1943
- 358th Fighter Group: 28 April – September 1943
- 361st Fighter Group: 28 August – 20 September 1943
- 365th Fighter Group: 19 July – 4 December 1943
- 366th Fighter Group: attached 1 June 1943 – 20 November 1943
- 371st Fighter Group: 30 September 1943 – 14 February 1944

=== Stations ===
- Philadelphia Airport, Pennsylvania, 11 August 1942 – April 1946
