= 159th Fighter Squadron =

Florida Air National Guard unit

159th Fighter Squadron

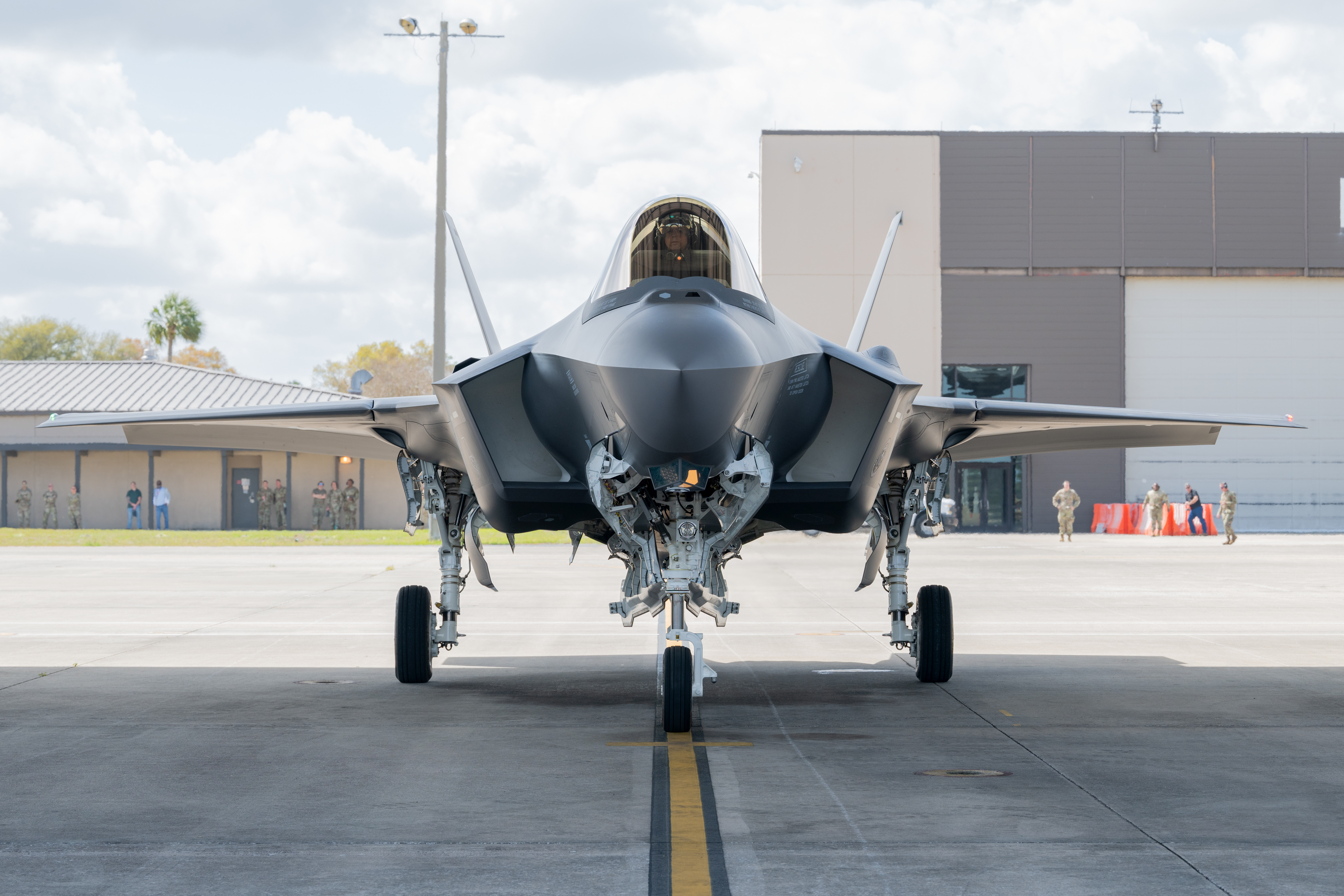
- An F-35A Lightning II aircraft arrives at 125th Fighter Wing
- Active: 1942–1945; 1947–1952; 1952–present
- Country: United States
- Allegiance: Florida
- Branch: Air National Guard
- Type: Squadron
- Role: Air defense fighter
- Part of: Florida Air National Guard
- Garrison/HQ: Jacksonville Air National Guard Base, Florida
- Nickname: Boxin' Gators
- Decorations: Distinguished Unit Citation

Insignia
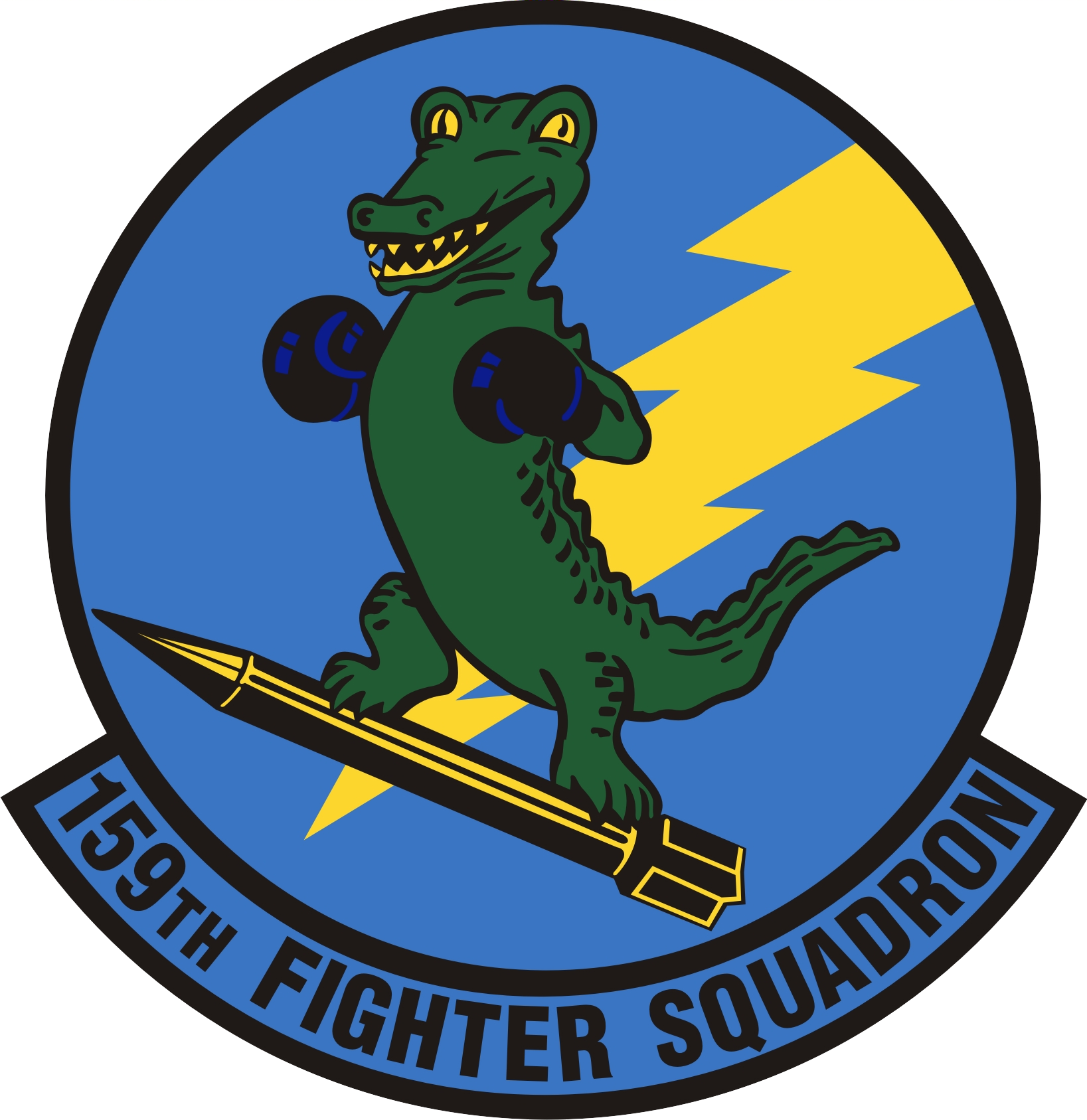
- 159th Fighter Squadron emblem

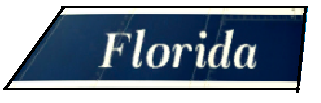
- F-15 Tail stripe (Note: F-35s do not have tail stripes.)

The 159th Fighter Squadron is a unit of the Florida Air National Guard's 125th Fighter Winglocated at Jacksonville Air National Guard Base, Florida. The 159th is equipped with the F-35A Lightning II.

== Mission ==
The squadron flies the single seat F-35A aircraft in the air superiority/air dominance role. As part of the Florida Air National Guard, the squadron reports to the First Air Force at Tyndall Air Force Base, Florida and is gained on mobilization by Air Combat Command. The squadron's main body is home based at Jacksonville ANGB but is and also maintains a permanent rotational alert detachment at Homestead Air Reserve Base, Florida.

The mission of the 159th is to provide air defense for the southeastern United States, as directed by the North American Aerospace Defense Command (NORAD) and United States Northern Command, in an area stretching from offshore of Charleston, South Carolina to the southern tip of Florida and across the Florida panhandle. In addition, the 159 FS provides the Continental NORAD Region commander with a rapid armed response to invasions of the sovereign airspace of the United States and to be able to respond with appropriate defensive measures against all hostile actions directed at the people and property of the United States. The squadron, as part of its parent wing, is also available to other combat commanders for forward deployment in order to perform air superiority/air dominance missions in other theaters outside of the United States.

== History ==
=== World War II ===
Established in late 1942 as a United States Army Air Forces (USAAF) P-47 Thunderbolt fighter squadron, the squadron trained under the I Fighter Command in the mid-Atlantic states. The 352nd Fighter Squadron also flew air defense missions as part of the Philadelphia Fighter Wing until it was deployed to the European Theater of Operations, being assigned to VIII Fighter Command in England in June 1943.

The unit served primarily as an escort organization, covering the penetration, attack and withdrawal of Boeing B-17 Flying Fortress and Consolidated B-24 Liberator bomber formations that the USAAF sent against targets on the European continent. The squadron also engaged in counter-air patrols, fighter sweeps, strafing and dive-bombing missions. It attacked such targets as German and German-occupied airdromes, marshalling yards, missile sites, industrial areas, ordnance depots, oil refineries, trains and highways. During its operations, the unit participated in the assault against the Luftwaffe and the German aircraft industry during the Big Week, 20–25 February 1944, and the attack on transportation facilities prior to the Normandy invasion on 6 June 1944 and support of the invasion forces thereafter, including the Saint-Lô breakout in July 1944.

The squadron supported the airborne attack in the Netherlands in September 1944 and upgraded to the P-51 Mustang aircraft in October. It then deployed to Chievres Airdrome (ALG A-84), Belgium between February and April 1945 flying tactical ground support missions during the airborne assault across the Rhine. The unit returned to England and flew its last combat mission on 20 April 1945. It was demobilized during the summer of 1945 in England and inactivated in the United States as a paper unit in October 1945.

=== Florida Air National Guard ===
==== The early post-war years ====
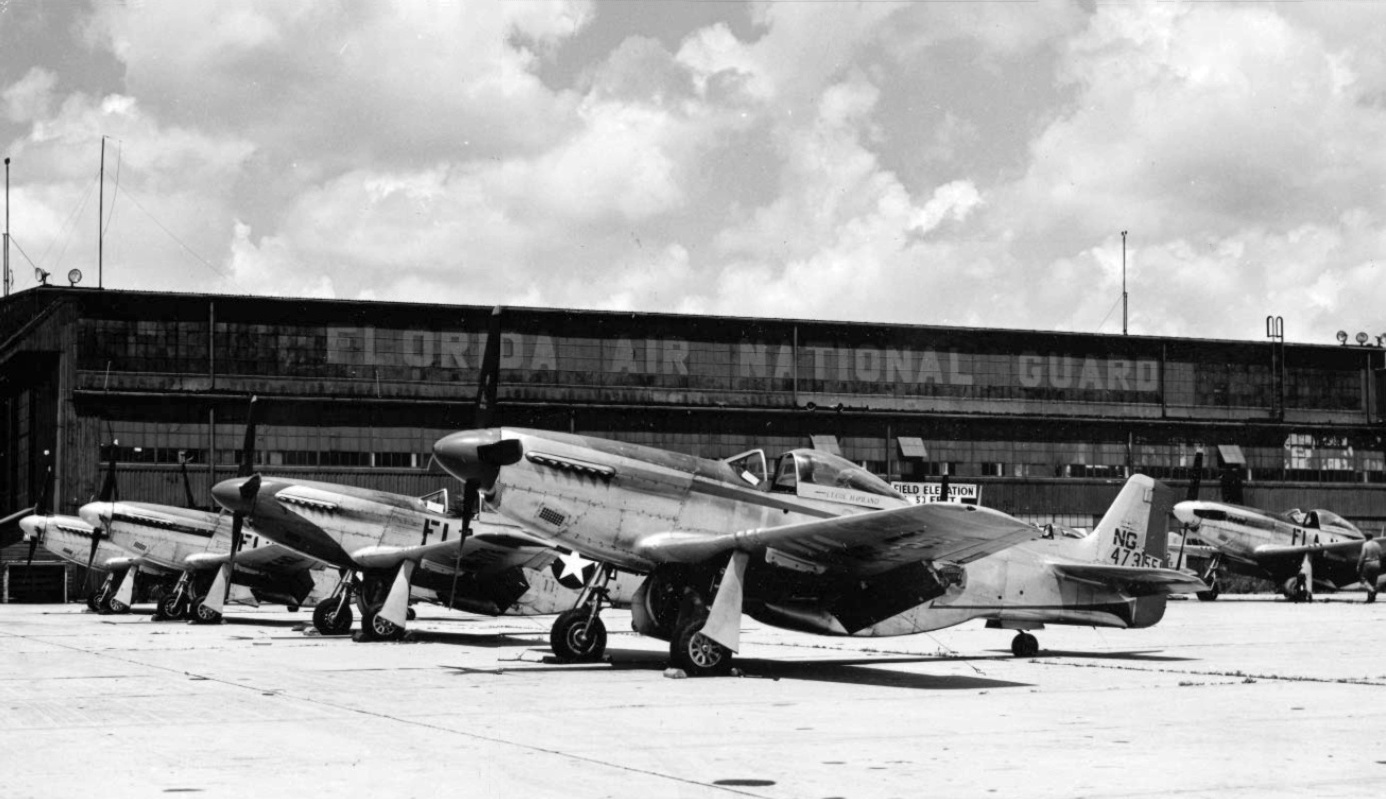
North American F-51D Mustang fighters of the 159th Fighter Squadron, Imeson Airport, Jacksonville, Florida, circa 1947.

At the conclusion of World War II, work began to organize an Air National Guard unit for Florida. The National Guard Bureau on 16 March 1946 gave states permission to request an Army Air Forces unit allotment. Months later, Florida accepted the 159th Fighter Squadron with an authorized strength of 50 officers and 303 enlisted men. Governor Millard F. Caldwell formally accepted the unit on 30 August 1946, and full federal recognition was granted 9 February 1947.

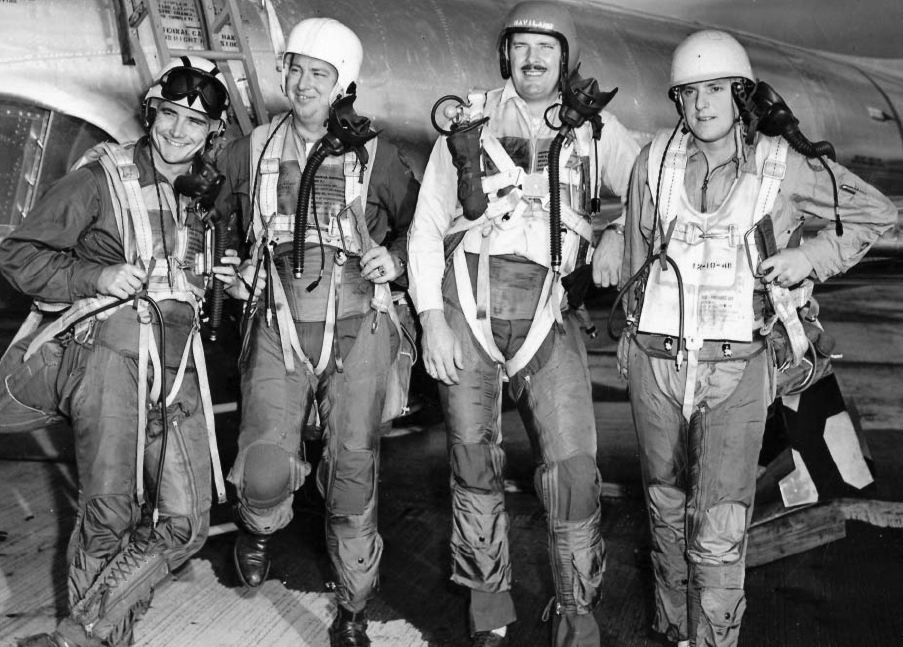
The 159th "Florida Rockets" demonstration team in 1948

A facility for housing the units became available in temporary World War II buildings on the west side of the Imeson Airport in Jacksonville, Florida. Upon the arrival of the unit's first aircraft, the P-51D Mustang, (later redesignated the F-51D in 1947) at Imeson Airport, the 159th became the first operational Air National Guard unit in Florida. With the establishment of the United States Air Force (USAF) as an independent service in September 1947, the 159th became a USAF organization. During its second year of operation, it became one of the first six Air National Guard squadrons in the United States equipped with jet aircraft. The conversion from the F-51D Mustang to the F-80C Shooting Star became official on 1 August 1948, when the unit was redesignated the 159th Fighter Squadron, Jet.

==== Combat in Korea ====
In the fall of 1950, the United States' involvement in the Korean War required extensive air power commitments from the USAF. To alleviate the strain on active duty forces, President Truman activated the FLANG on 10 October 1950 and the FLANG pilots were ordered to report to George Air Force Base, California. On arrival at George, the 159th Fighter Squadron joined the 116th Fighter Group – an organization consisting of Air National Guard units from Florida, Georgia (the 158th) and California (the 196th). The group and squadrons reorganized under the Wing-Base Plan on 1 November 1950 as an F-84 Thunderjet unit and were redesignated the 116th Fighter Bomber Group, commanded by Lieutenant Colonel Howard L. Galbreath. The group received instructions to move to the Far East, which overrode their original orders to Europe to replace an active duty U.S. Air Force squadron slated to go to Korea.

By 10 August 1951, upon arrival overseas, the 159th Fighter Squadron operated under the command of Major Dan Sharpe, USAF. The 116th Fighter Group was then assigned to the Fifth Air Force commanded by Lieutenant General Thomas C. Waskow at its new home, Misawa Air Base, Japan. A primary requirement of the Florida Air National Guard during the Korean War was one of Air Defense coupled with combat missions over Korea. There, the 159th concentrated on flying dangerous ground attack missions against enemy supply lines and troops in the field. Pilots flew 92 combat sorties in four days with very credible results. For its part in the war, the unit earned the Korean Service Citation with Bronze Service Stars.

==== After Korea ====
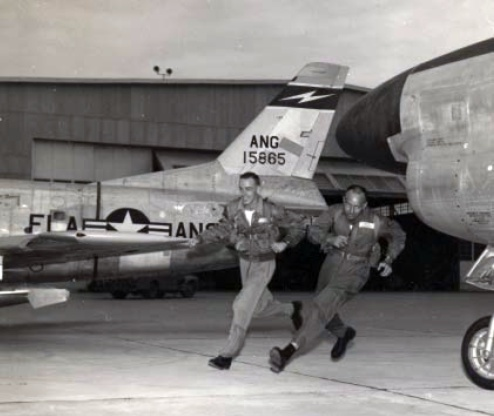
159th Squadron pilots race to their F-86D Sabres during an alert scramble at Jacksonville in the late 1950s

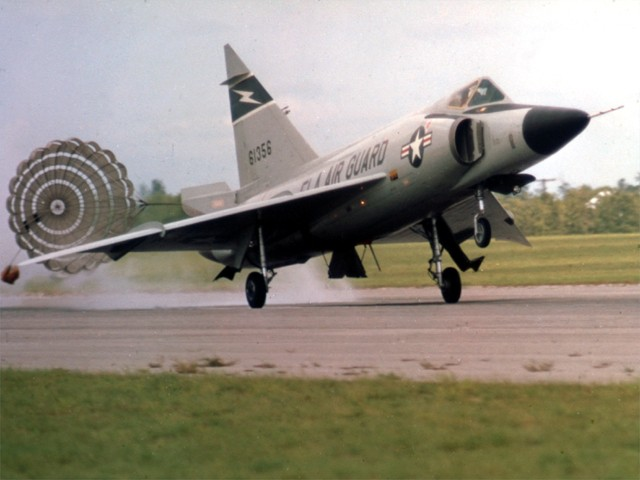
159th Fighter-Interceptor Squadron F-102A-75-CO, AF Ser. No. 56-1356

Upon its release from active duty, the unit returned on 9 July 1952 with their new commander to Imeson Municipal Airport in Jacksonville. The unit's F-84Es and all its ground equipment were turned over to the U.S. Air Force and left in Japan. On 10 July 1952, the 159th Fighter Squadron, Jet Propelled, was re-designated the 159th Fighter Bomber Squadron, dissolving the 159th Utility Flight and integrating it into the unit. Six months later, the 159th Fighter Bomber Squadron was re-equipped with F-51H Mustangs and re-designated the 159th Fighter Bomber Squadron Augmented (159 FBSA). From October to December 1954, the 159 FBSA was equipped with nine different types of aircraft such as the T-6 Texan, B-26 Invader, C-45 Expeditor, C-47 Skytrain, C-54 Skymaster, F-51H Mustang, T-33 Shooting Star, F-80 Shooting Star, and F-86A Sabre. By the end of December 1954, things settled down and the 159 FBSA had an entire squadron of F-80Cs for the second time. There were now 43 officers and warrant officers and 472 enlisted men in the unit.

In July 1955, while still equipped with F-80Cs, the unit was redesignated the 159th Fighter-Interceptor Squadron, with a mission change to air defense. By 1 July 1956, the parent unit became the 125th Fighter Group and both organizations were operationally gained by Air Defense Command (ADC). The activation of the 125th coincided with the conversion to the F-86D Sabre, an all-weather interceptor. The F-86 made the 125th a self-sustaining unit capable of performing the air defense mission in all types of weather, day or night. In 1959 and 1960, the 125th underwent two aircraft conversions which greatly increased the unit's inventory and operational costs. In June 1959, the unit converted from the F-86D to the F-86L Sabre. Another major conversion began 1 July 1960, when the unit converted from the F-86L to the F-102A Delta Dagger supersonic fighter-interceptor.

Following the Cuban Missile Crisis, the 159th also established a detachment of no less than two rotational F-102 aircraft, pilots, and support personnel at Homestead AFB in southern Florida to maintain a 24/7/365 armed alert, augmenting other F-102 aircraft on armed alert in Jacksonville. In the late 1960s, the 159 FIS and 125 FIG would also see their operating location change. Due to its limited ability to handle newer commercial jet aircraft, the local government officials in Jacksonville and Duval County in the early 1960s determined that Imeson Airport would need to be replaced by a newer, larger airport with a greater capability for accommodating jet airliner traffic and long-term growth. With the scaling back and ultimate closure of Imeson Airport, and its replacement by the new Jacksonville International Airport during 1967 and 1968, the 159th subsequently relocated to a newly constructed Air National Guard installation at the new airport and was fully in place and operational by 1968. That same year, the active USAF gaining command's name was changed to Aerospace Defense Command.

==== The 1970s to the present ====
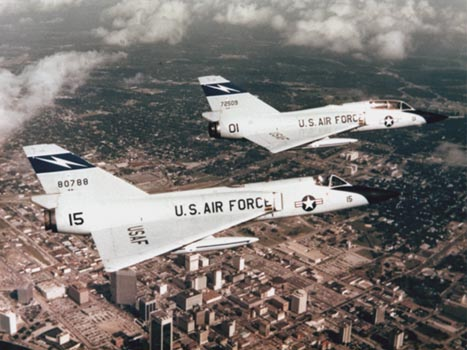
159th FIS F-106 and TF-106 Delta Darts

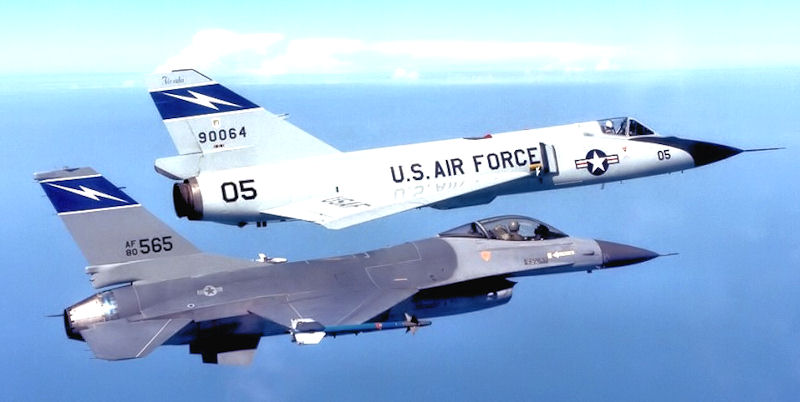
159th Fighter-Interceptor Squadron F-106 and F-16 in flight, 1987

In 1974, the squadron converted from the F-102 Delta Dagger to the F-106 Delta Dart, flying both its single seat F-106A and twin-seat F=106B variants. By the end of the year, with the conversion complete and the F-106 formally integrated into the 125 FIG weapons inventory, alert status resumed at Jacksonville International Airport. Pilots and ground crew members received extensive training in the operations and maintenance of the F-106 and they soon gained the expertise needed to handle the sophisticated all-weather supersonic fighter-interceptor. Concurrent operation of the T-33 Shooting Star also continued, functioning as a simulated target aircraft for intercept training and for other pilot proficiency training.

In October 1979, in anticipation of the inactivation of Aerospace Defense Command, the USAF gained command responsibilities which shifted to Tactical Air Command and a sub-organization equivalent to a numbered air force designated as Air Defense, Tactical Air Command (ADTAC). In 1985, ADTAC was replacec by First Air Force as the numbered air force for all Air National Guard fighter units charged with a continental air defense mission as their primary role.

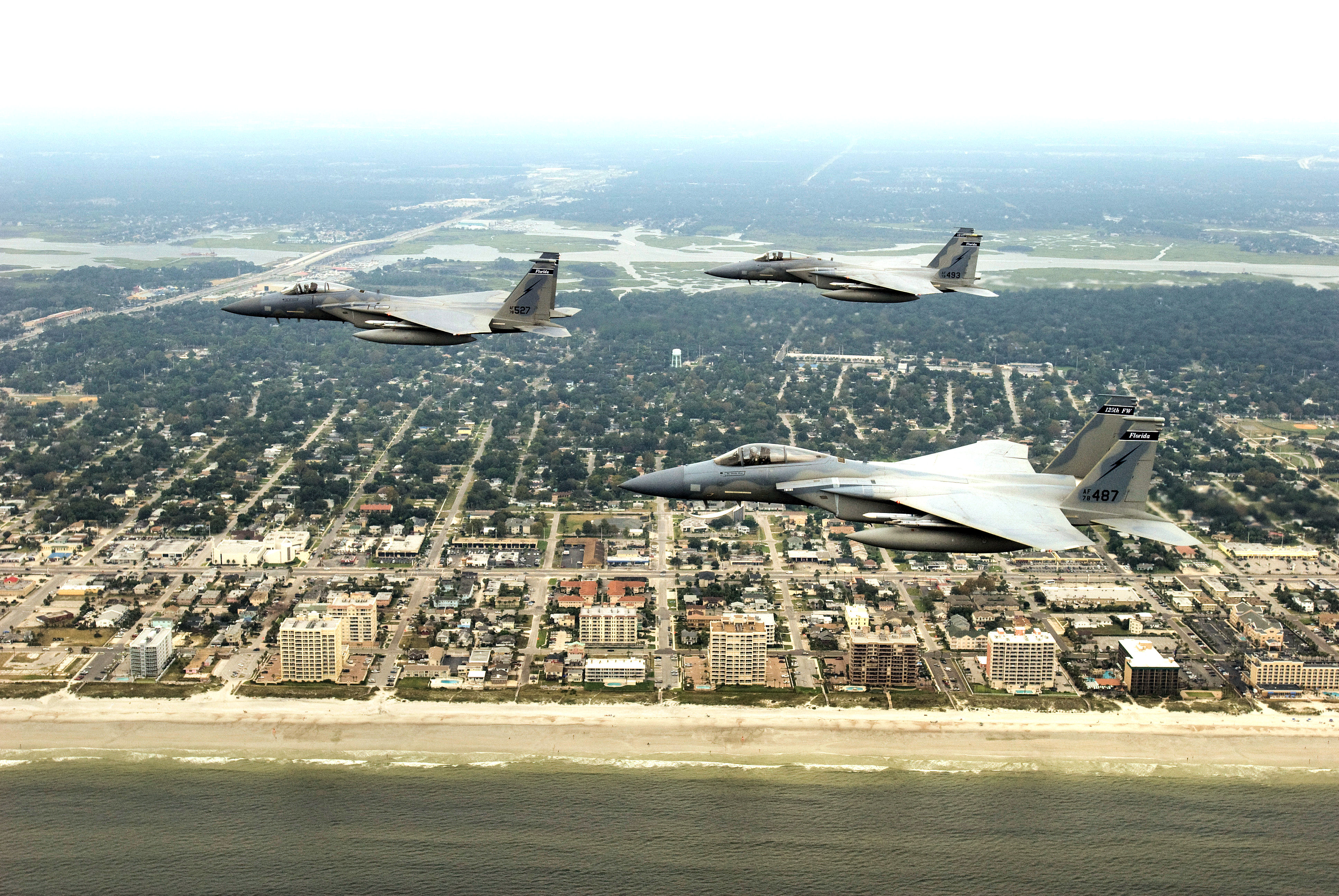
159th Fighter Squadron F-15s over Jacksonville Beach, Florida (Note: Aircraft are McDonnell Douglas F-15C-21-MC Eagles, serial numbers 78-0487, 78-0527 and 78-0493.)

The 159th Fighter Interceptor Squadron flew the F-106 Delta Dart for 12 years but, by the end of 1986, the U.S. Air Force began to phase out the F-106, converting Regular Air Force units flying the Delta Dart to the F-15 Eagle and most Air National Guard F-106 units to the F-4 Phantom II. However, it was determined that the multipurpose F-4 was not the ideal fighter for the continental air defense mission and the Air Force and the National Guard Bureau decided to transition the squadron to the F-16 Fighting Falcon.

In January 1987, the unit converted to the F-16A, followed by a small number of additional twin-seat F-16Bs. On 1 April 1987, the 159 FIS became the first F-16 unit to sit alert in an air defense role as a fighter interceptor unit on a 24/7/365 basis. This conversion also marked the 11th fighter aircraft conversion for the unit. Following avionics upgrades tailored for the air defense mission, these aircraft would become known as the F-16ADF.

In June 1992, after the inactivation of Tactical Air Command, the squadron was once again redesignated the 159th Fighter Squadron and was operationally gained by the newly established Air Combat Command (ACC).

In 1995, the 159th Fighter Squadron converted from the F-16ADF to the A and B versions of the F-15 Eagle as its primary fighter aircraft. Five years after the conversion to the F-15, Fighter Data Link technology was incorporated into the F-15, allowing the pilots to link flight data with multiple users, providing real-time information on air and ground threats. The 159th continued to incorporate newer technology in its 1970s era F-15As and F-15Bs under the F-15 Multistage Improvement Program, such as the upgrade to 220E model engines.

During the late 1990s, the 159th was also fully integrated into the USAF Air and Space Expeditionary Force and routinely deployed aircraft and personnel to the 363rd Air Expeditionary Wing at Prince Sultan Air Base, Al Kharj, Kingdom of Saudi Arabia in support of Operation Southern Watch, enforcing the No-Fly Zone over southern Iraq. Since 11 September 2001, the squadron has been extensively involved in Operation Noble Eagle, performing its historic continental air defense mission in the southeastern United States, as well as having periodically deployed aircraft and personnel to U.S. Central Command Air Forces, now known as U.S. Air Forces Central in Southwest Asia in support of Operations Enduring Freedom and Iriqi Freedom until their conclusion. In 2006, the 159 FS replaced its previous F-15A/B Eagle (MSIP) aircraft with its current F-15C and F-15D variants.

In 2015, the 159th deployed as the first ever Air National Guard Theater Security Package to augment United States Air Forces in Europe - Air Forces Africa. The squadron deployed again in 2017 to Romania and then to Iceland in support of the Icelandic Air Policing mission.

=== Squadron Future ===
The 159th Fighter Squadron is transitioning from the F-15C/D to the Lockheed Martin F-35 Lightning II multirole fighter. Pilots in the squadron began the transition to the new airframe in 2025. The F-15C is projected to run out of service life in the mid-2020's across the Air Force and Air National Guard.

== Lineage ==
- Constituted as the 352d Fighter Squadron (Single Engine) on 29 September 1942

Activated on 1 October 1942
Inactivated on 18 October 1945
Redesignated: 159th Fighter Squadron, Single Engine and allotted to the National Guard on 24 May 1946
Extended federal recognition on 9 February 1947
Redesignated 159th Fighter Squadron, Jet on 1 August 1948
Federalized and placed on active duty on 10 October 1950
Redesignated 159th Fighter-Bomber Squadron on 1 November 1950
Inactivated, released from active duty and returned to Florida state control on 10 July 1952
Redesignated 159th Fighter-Interceptor Squadron on 10 July 1952
Redesignated 159th Fighter Squadron on 15 March 1992

=== Assignments ===
- 353d Fighter Group, 1 October 1942 – 18 October 1945
- 116th Fighter Group, 9 February 1947
- Fourteenth Air Force, 10 October 1950
- 116th Fighter Group (later 116th Fighter-Bomber Group, 116th Fighter-Interceptor Group, 116th Fighter-Bomber Group, 116th Fighter Group), October 1950
- 125th Fighter Group (later 125th Fighter-Interceptor Group, 125th Fighter Group), 1 July 1956
- 125th Operations Group, 1 August 1995 – present

=== Stations ===
- Mitchel Field, New York, 1 October 1942
- Richmond Army Air Base, Virginia, c. 7 October 1942
- Baltimore Municipal Airport, Maryland, c. 26 October 1942 – c. 27 May 1943
- RAF Goxhill (AAF-345), England, June 1943
- RAF Metfield (AAF-366), England, 3 August 1943
- RAF Raydon (AAF-157), England, April 1944– October 1945
- Camp Kilmer, New Jersey, c. 16–18 October 1945
- Jacksonville Imeson Airport, Florida, 9 February 1947 – 1968
- Jacksonville International Airport (later Jacksonville Air National Guard Base), Florida, 1968 – present

=== Aircraft ===
- P-40 Warhawk, 1942–1943
- P-47D Thunderbolt, July 1943 – 10 November 1944
- P-51D (later F-51D) Mustang, 1944, 1947–1948
- P-51K Mustang, December 1944 – October 1945
- F-80B Shooting Star (1948–1950)(1954–1956)
- F-84E Thunderjet (1950–1952)
- F-51H Mustang (1952–1954)
- F-86A Sabre (1954–1956)
- F-86D Sabre Interceptor (1956–1960)
- F-102A Delta Dagger (1960–1974)
- F-106A/B Delta Dart (1974–1987)
- F-16A/B/ADF Fighting Falcon (1987–1995)
- F-15A/B Eagle (1995–2006)
- F-15C/D Eagle (2006–2025)
- F-35A Lightning II (2024-present)
