= 466th Air Expeditionary Group =

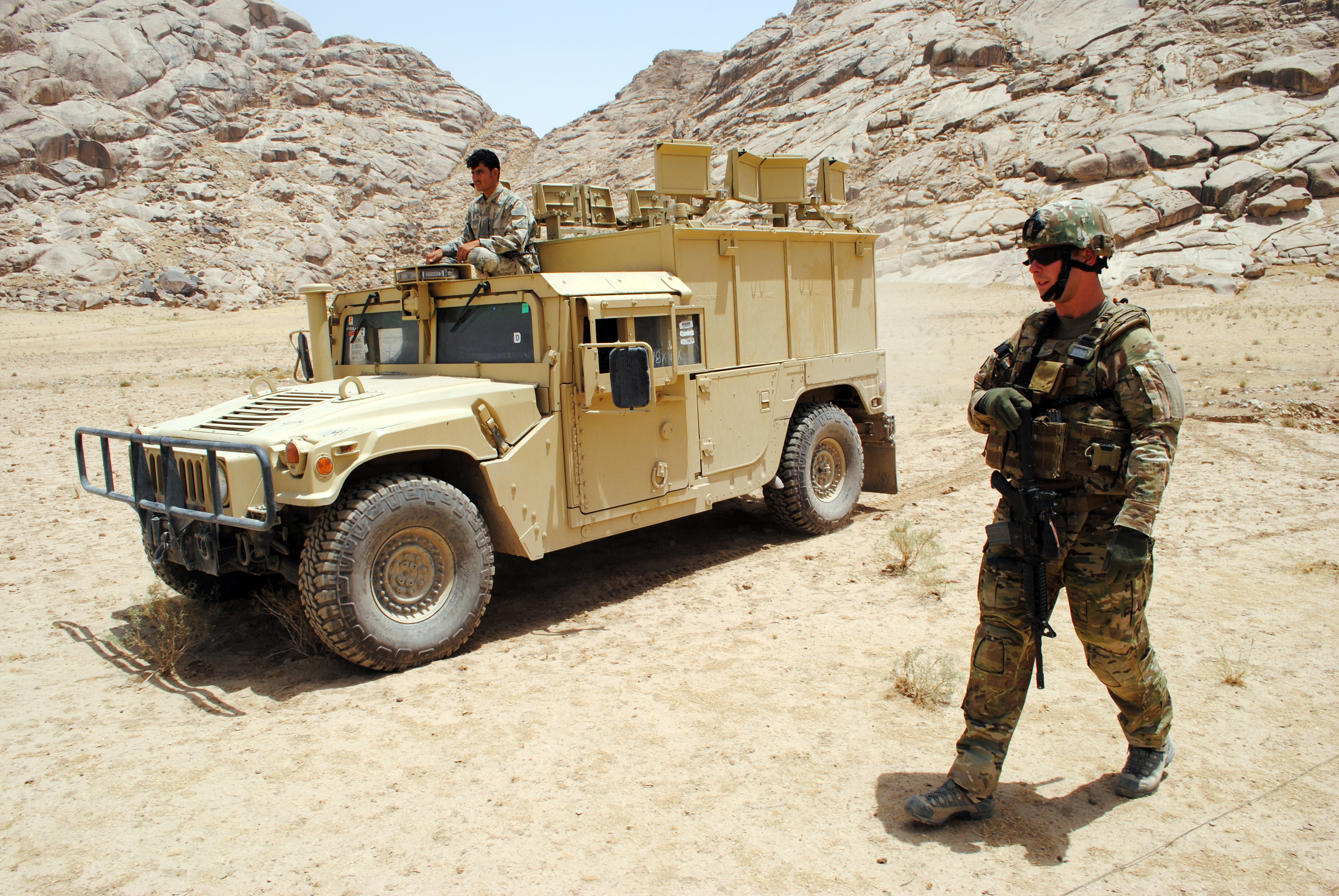
- A 466th Group Explosive Ordnance Disposal specialist working with the Afghan Border Police
- Active: 1942–1945; 2009–unknown; 2012–2016?; 2021
- Country: United States
- Branch: United States Air Force
- Role: Manage deployed airmen
- Size: Approximately 400 airmen
- Motto: Airmen in Action
- Colors: Ultramarine Blue, Air Force Yellow, Silver Gray
- Engagements: European Theater of Operations

Insignia
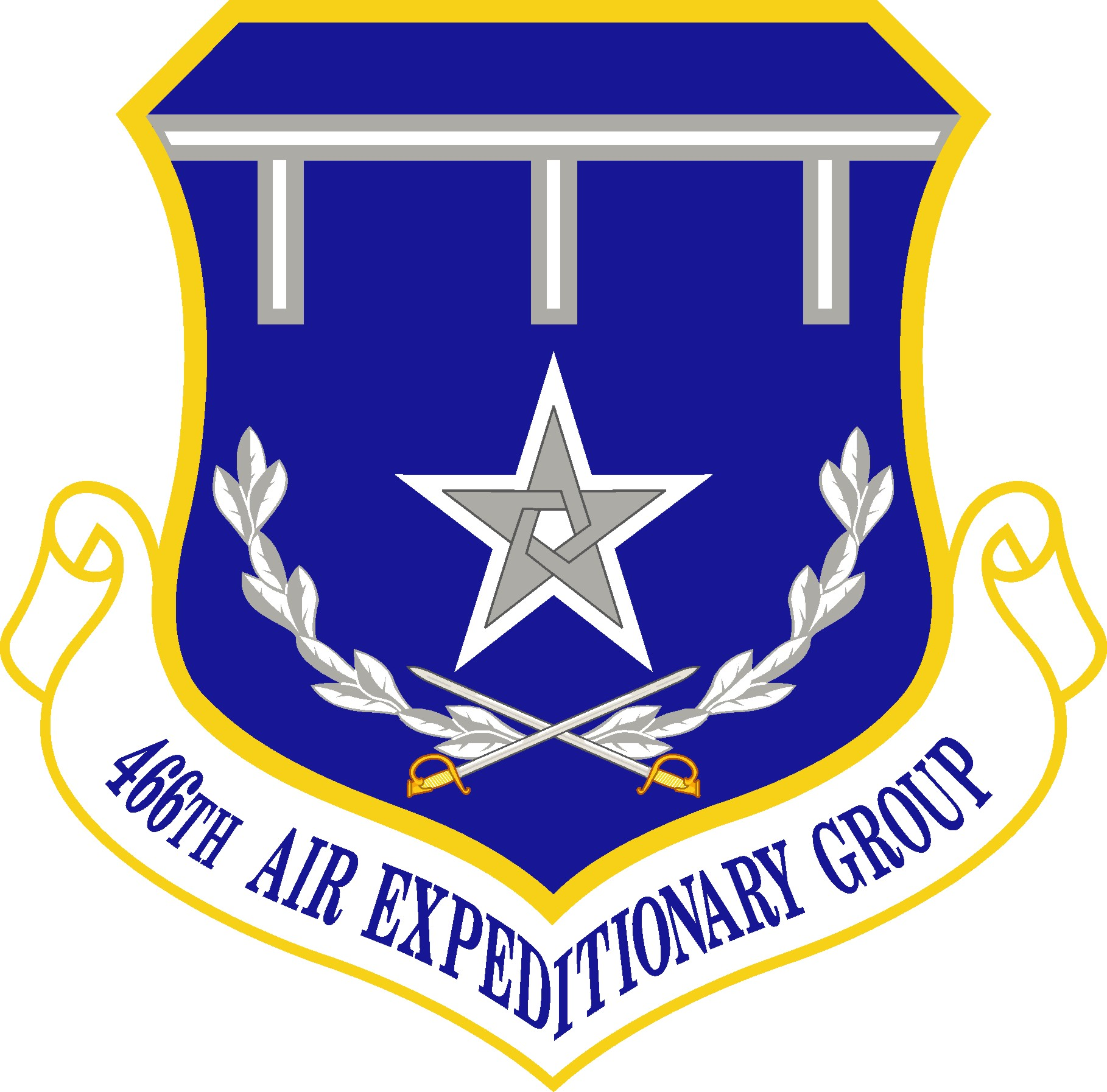
- 466th Air Expeditionary Group emblem

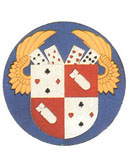
- 466th Bombardment Group emblem

The 466th Air Expeditionary Group of the United States Air Force appears in the mid-2020s to be administering mobilizations of Air National Guard service members for Continental United States homeland security missions.

During the 2010s it was a personnel administration group for individual and group Air Force augmentees in Afghanistan. This included "joint expeditionary tasking" airmen, who were assigned to non-United States Air Force units during their deployment. It also includes individual augmentees assigned to joint organizations. The group was headquartered at Al Udeid Air Base, Qatar since 2014, when it moved from the Transit Center at Manas. The group provides a lifeline, referred to as a "Blue Line' back to the Air Force. Two squadrons that were part of the group, the 466th and 966th Air Expeditionary Squadrons were located in Afghanistan in early 2014.

The 466th's mission was formerly performed by the now inactive 755th Air Expeditionary Group.

== History ==
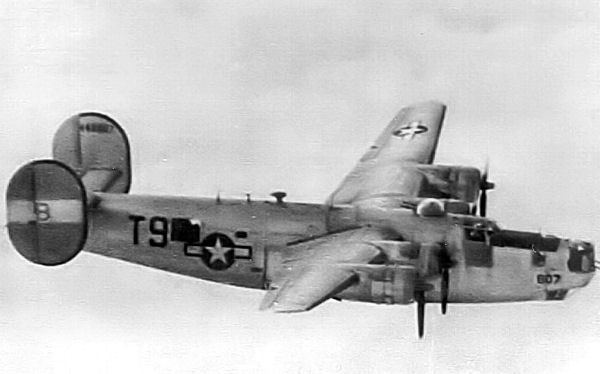
Consolidated B-24J-20-FO Liberator Serial 44-48807 '807' T9-B of the 784th Bomb Squadron

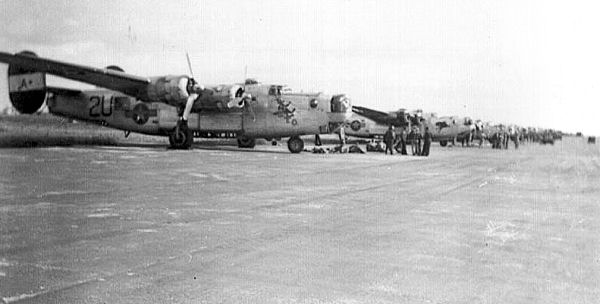
Liberators of the 785th Bomb Squadron

The group was constituted as the 466th Bombardment Group (Heavy) and activated on 1 August 1943 at Alamogordo Army Air Field, New Mexico with the 784th, 785th, 786th and 787th Bombardment Squadrons assigned. Personnel started training with Consolidated B-24 Liberators at Kearns Army Air Field in Utah at the end of August 1943, remaining there until late November when the unit retr\urned to Alamogordo. In February 1944 they moved to Topeka Army Air Field Kansas for a week before beginning the trip overseas to England.

The ground echelon sailed from New York on the RMS Queen Mary on 28 February 1944. The air echelon took the southern ferry route and arrived at RAF Attlebridge England, in March 1944. At Attlebridge the group became part of Eighth Air Force. The 466th was assigned to the 96th Combat Bombardment Wing. Their group tail code was "Circle-L". Later their tail marking was a white fess on red vertical tailplane.

The 466th began operations on 22 March 1944 by participating in a daylight raid on Berlin. The group attacked targets including marshalling yards at Liège and Saarbrücken, airfields at St Trond and Chartres, a repair and assembly plant at Reims, factories at Brunswick, oil refineries at Bohlen, aircraft plants at Kempten, mineral works at Hamburg, a synthetic oil plant at Misburg, a fuel depot at Dülmen, and aircraft engine works at Eisenach.

Other operations included attacking pillboxes along the coast of Normandy on D-Day, 6 June 1944, and afterwards striking interdiction targets behind the beachhead. It bombed enemy positions at Saint-Lô during Operation Cobra, the Allied breakthrough in July 1944. It hauled oil and gasoline to Allied forces advancing across France in September. It attacked German communications and transportation during the Battle of the Bulge from December 1944 to January 1945 and bombed the airfield at Nordhorn in support of Operation Varsity, the airborne assault across the Rhine on 24 March 1945.

The 466th flew its last combat mission on 25 April 1945, striking a transformer station at Traunstein. During combat operations, the 785th Bomb Squadron flew 55 consecutive missions without loss. The group flew 232 combat missions with 5,762 sorties dropping 12,914 tons of bombs. They lost 47 aircraft in combat.

The group redeployed to the United States during June and July 1945. The air echelon departed Attlebridge in mid-June 1945. The ground units sailed from Greenock on the RMS Queen Mary on 6 June 1945. They arrived in New York on 11 July 1945. The group was then established at Sioux Falls Army Air Field South Dakota in July and was redesignated the 466th Bombardment Group, Very Heavy in August 1945 and was equipped with Boeing B-29 Superfortress aircraft. The group was transferred to Pueblo, Colorado, and then later to Davis–Monthan Field, Arizona for Superfortress training and programmed for deployment to the Pacific Theater. With the end of the war the Group was inactivated on 17 October 1945.

=== Expeditionary operations ===
The group was converted to provisional status as the 466th Air Expeditionary Group in 2009. In May 2009, the group was activated as the mission being performed by the 466th Air Expeditionary Squadron was expanding. The 466th Squadron was assigned to the group and three additional squadrons were activated to support the growing number of airmen supporting Provincial Reconstruction Teams, embedded training teams and brigade support teams. Each of the four squadrons was responsible for airmen within one of the International Security Assistance Force’s regional commands. The 466th Squadron at Kandahar Airfield served Train Advise Assist Command - South and Train Advise Assist Command - West, the 766th Squadron covered Train Advise Assist Command - East, the 866th Train Advise Assist Command - Capital, while the 966th was responsible for Train Advise Assist Command - North.

The group administered USAF airmen that were "loaned out" through tactical control to non-Air Force units executing joint missions. It was responsible for over 1,300 airmen at 48 different locations in Afghanistan so that none of those Airmen become isolated from the Air Force. It processed airmen arriving in theatre to ensure they were properly briefed and equipped for the mission they were to perform.

In 2011, as operations in Afghanistan diminished, the group's 766th Air Expeditionary Squadron, which had been responsible for airmen in Train Advise Assist Command – East, was inactivated and the 966th Squadron added this responsibility to its existing oversight in Train Advise Assist Command – North.

The 466th AEG was composed of airmen from more than 56 Air Force Specialty Codes including security forces, explosive ordnance disposal, civil engineering, contracting, communications, medical, intelligence, legal and logistics support.

It was moved to Al Udeid, Qatar, in 2014, and seemingly inactivated there at some later point.

On June 1, 2016 the 966th Air Expeditionary Squadron, 466th AEG, was inactivated. It rose again as the 955th AES. From that point the 955th AES fell under the 455th Expeditionary Mission Support Group of the 455th Air Expeditionary Wing, physically located in Afghanistan.

=== Homeland security ===
- January 2021 – March 2021, Colonel Cory J. Kestel (ANG) served as Commander, 466th Air Expeditionary Group, Savannah, Ga.
- Elements 142nd Wing served as 466 AEG circa September 2021 at Langley Air Force Base

== Lineage ==
- Constituted as the 466th Bombardment Group (Heavy)' on 19 May 1943

Activated on 1 August 1943
Redesignated 466th Bombardment Group, Very Heavy in August 1945
Inactivated on 17 October 1945

- Converted to provisional status, redesignated 466th Air Expeditionary Group and assigned to United States Air Forces Central Command to activate as needed.

Activated c. May 2009
Inactivated unknown
Activated 26 November 2012

=== Assignments ===
- IV Bomber Command, 1 August 1943 – February 1944
- 96th Combat Bombardment Wing, 7 March 1944 – 6 July 1945
- Second Air Force, 15 July – 17 October 1945
- 455th Air Expeditionary Wing, May 2009 – unknown
- 9th Air Expeditionary Task Force, later 9th Air and Space Expeditionary Task Force, 26 November 2012 – unknown (2016?)

=== Components ===
- 466th Air Expeditionary Squadron, May 2009 – unknown, 26 November 2012 – December 2014

Kandahar Airfield

- 766th Air Expeditionary Squadron, May 2009 – 23 March 2011.

Forward Operating Base Sharana

- 784th Bombardment Squadron, 1 August 1943 – 17 October 1945
- 785th Bombardment Squadron, 1 August 1943 – 17 October 1945
- 786th Bombardment Squadron, 1 August 1943 – 17 October 1945
- 787th Bombardment Squadron, 1 August 1943 – 17 October 1945
- 866th Air Expeditionary Squadron, 1 May 2009 – unknown

Camp Phoenix, Kabul

- 966th Air Expeditionary Squadron, May 2009 – unknown, 26 November 2012 – June 1, 2016

Bagram Air Base Responsible for all JET/IA Airmen in Afghanistan

=== Commanders ===
- Col John D. Cline, USAF (2012 – 2013)
- Col Timothy G. Lee, USAF (2013 — 2014)
- Col Scott M. Guilbeault, USAF (2014 – 2015)
- Col Brian D. Burns, USAF (2015 – 2016)

=== Stations ===
- Alamogordo Army Air Field, New Mexico, 1 August 1943
- Kearns Army Air Field, Utah 31 August 1943
- Alamogordo Army Airfield, New Mexico, 1 August 1943
- Topeka Army Air Field, Kansas, 5–13 February 1944
- RAF Attlebridge (AAF-120), England 7 March 1944 – 6 July 1945
- Sioux Falls Army Air Field, South Dakota, 15 July 1945
- Pueblo Army Air Base, Colorado, 25 July 1945
- Davis–Monthan Field, Arizona, 15 August – 17 October 1945
- Bagram Air Base, May 2009 – November 2012
- Transit Center at Manas, Kyrgyzstan, 26 November 2012 – February 2014
- Al Udeid Air Base, Qatar, February 2014 – unknown (2016?)

=== Aircraft ===
- Consolidated B-24 Liberator, 1943–1945
- Boeing B-29 Superfortress, 1945
