= 786 Squadron =

786 Squadron may refer to:

- 786 Naval Air Squadron, United Kingdom
- 786th Aircraft Control and Warning Squadron, United States
- 786th Air Expeditionary Squadron, United States
- 786th Bombardment Squadron, United States
- 786th Security Forces Squadron, United States
- 786th Tactical Fighter Squadron, United States
- 786th Civil Engineer Squadron, United States Air Force unit based at Ramstein Air Base
