= 14th Air Division =

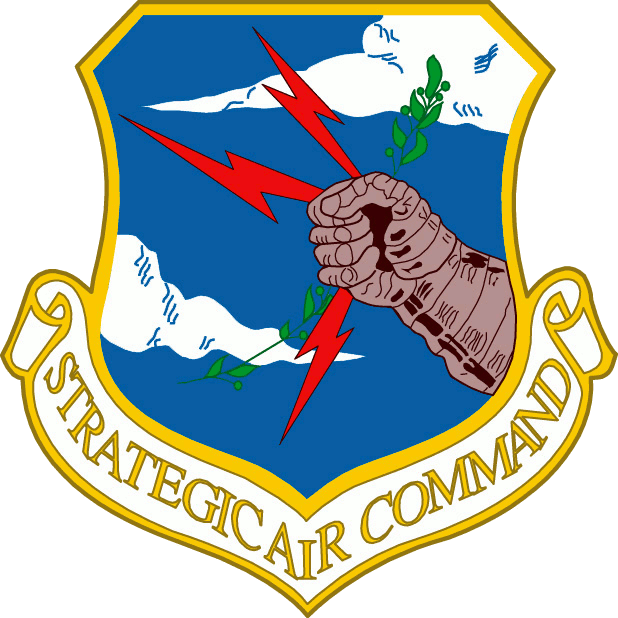
14th Air Division
- Active: 1940–1942; 1942–1945; 1951–1991
- Country: United States
- Branch: United States Air Force
- Engagements: European Theater of Operations

Insignia
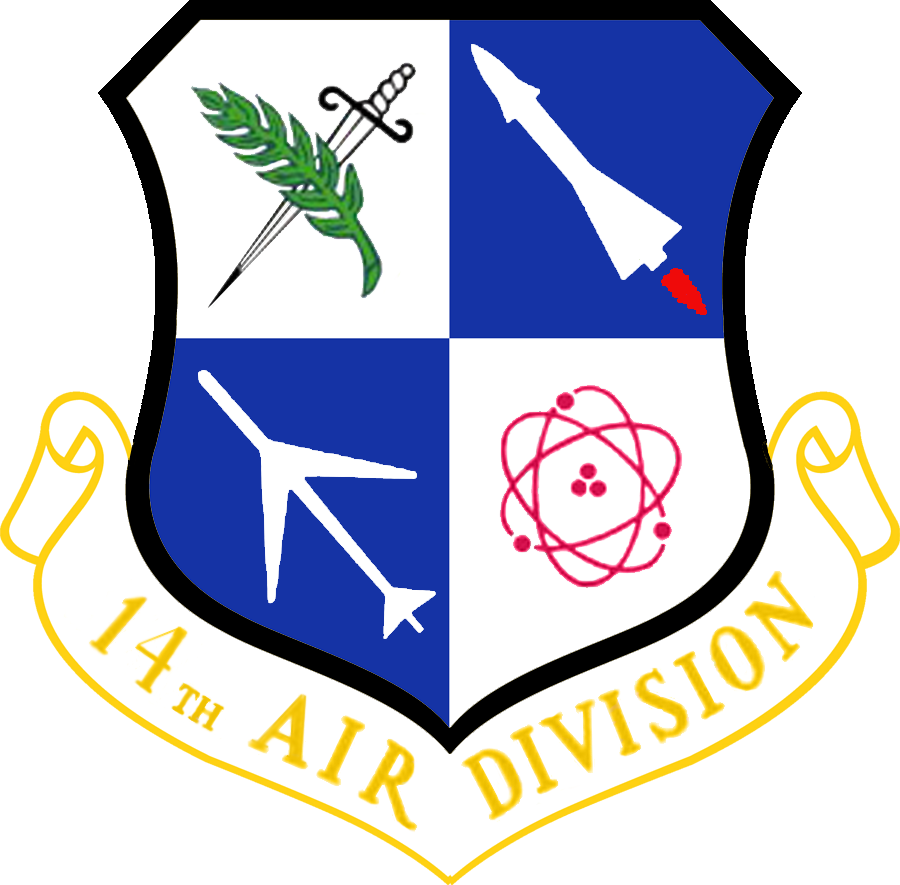
- 14th Air Division emblem (approved 16 November 1962)

The 14th Air Division is an inactive United States Air Force unit. Its last assignment was with Fifteenth Air Force, stationed at Beale Air Force Base, California. It was inactivated on 14 June 1989.

== History ==
=== World War II ===
The organization was initially activated in Hawaii as the 14th Pursuit Wing to contribute to the defense of the Hawaiian Islands. Its designation was soon changed to Hawaiian Interceptor Command. The Hawaiian Interceptor Command suffered heavy losses during the Japanese attack on Pearl Harbor (7 December 1941), but airmen managed to shoot down several enemy aircraft. A short time later, it was inactivated and its men and equipment became the cadre for VII Fighter Command.

The wing was reformed as the 14th Bombardment Wing, the unit was one of the primary Consolidated B-24 Liberator heavy strategic bombardment groups of the Eighth Air Force's 2d Bombardment Division in World War II. Its subordinate groups flew bombing missions against German airfields, oil installations, and marshalling yards. Wing components supported Operation Overlord, the invasion of Normandy, in June 1944 by attacking strong points in the beachhead area and transportation targets behind the front lines. Later, in December 1944 – January 1945, the wing helped to check the German offensive during the Battle of the Bulge. In March 1945, subordinate units supported Operation Lumberjack, the campaign to cross the Rhine River.

=== Cold War ===
Reactivated in 1951, the 14th Air Division was an intermediate command echelon of Strategic Air Command. The command provided operational reconnaissance, maintained round the clock radar surveillance to detect sea launched ballistic missiles from the Pacific Ocean area, and provided for crisis management during periods of increased operational readiness. For a brief period, between 1962 and 1965, the division maintained a SM-68 Titan I intercontinental ballistic missile complex, in addition to its assigned aircraft. The division also supervised all of Strategic Air Command's initial combat crew training for the Boeing KC-135 Stratotanker, Boeing B-52G Stratofortress and B-52H, Lockheed U-2, and Lockheed SR-71 aircraft.

It was inactivated in 1991 as part of the military drawdown of the USAF after the end of the Cold War.

== Lineage ==
- Established as the 14th Pursuit Wing on 19 October 1940

Activated on 1 November 1940
Inactivated on 23 January 1942

- Redesignated 14th Bombardment Wing on 23 August 1942

Activated on 1 October 1942
Redesignated: 14th Bombardment Wing (Heavy) on 1 February 1943
Redesignated: 14th Combat Bombardment Wing, Heavy on 7 August 1944
Redesignated: 14th Bombardment Wing, Heavy on 15 June 1945
Inactivated on 7 November 1945

- Redesignated 14th Air Division on 1 February 1951

Organized on 10 February 1951
Discontinued on 16 June 1952

- Activated on 16 June 1952

Redesignated: 14th Strategic Aerospace Division on 1 March 1962
Redesignated: 14th Air Division on 31 March 1972
Inactivated on 1 September 1991

=== Assignments ===
- Hawaiian Air Force, 1 November 1940 – 23 January 1942
- Eighth Air Force, 1 October 1942

Attached to: Third Air Force, 1 October 1942 – c. 11 May 1943

- VIII Bomber Command, 4 June 1943
- 2d Combat Bombardment Wing (Heavy), August 1943
- 2d Bombardment Division (later 2 Air) Division), 13 September 1943

Attached to: 96th Combat Bombardment Wing, Heavy, 5 – 15 June 1945

- 3d Air Division, 16 June-26 August 1945
- Army Service Forces, 27 August 1945
- Fourth Air Force, 6 September-7 November 1945
- Fifteenth Air Force, 10 February 1951 – 16 June 1952; 16 June 1952 – 1 September 1991

=== Components ===
Wings

- 5th Strategic Reconnaissance Wing (later 5th Bombardment Wing): 10 February 1951 – 25 July 1968 (detached 14 January-12 April 1955)
- 6th Strategic Wing (later 6th Strategic Reconnaissance Wing): 30 June 1971 – 1 October 1976; 1 October 1985 – 9 August 1990
- 9th Bombardment Wing (later 9th Strategic Reconnaissance Wing): 10 February 1951 – 1 May 1953; 25 June 1966 – 1 September 1991
- 17th Bombardment Wing: 30 September 1975 – 30 September 1976
- 22d Bombardment Wing (later 22d Air Refueling Wing): 31 March 1970 – 30 June 1971; 23 January 1987 – 1 July 1988
- 55th Strategic Reconnaissance Wing: 30 June 1971 – 1 October 1976; 1 October 1985 – 1 September 1991
- 92d Strategic Aerospace Wing: attached 15 June-1 July 1968, assigned 2 July 1968 – 31 March 1970
- 93d Bombardment Wing: 1 October 1976 – 1 October 1985
- 100th Strategic Reconnaissance Wing (later 100 Air Refueling Wing): 30 June 1971 – 1 August 1972; 30 September 1976 – 15 March 1983
- 320th Bombardment Wing: 1 February 1963 – 1 July 1965; 31 March 1970 – 30 June 1971; 1 October 1972 – 1 October 1982
- 456th Strategic Aerospace Wing (later, 456 Bombardment Wing): 1 February 1963 – 30 June 1971; 1 October 1972 – 30 September 1975
- 4126th Strategic Wing: 8 February 1959 – 1 February 1963
- 4134th Strategic Wing: 1 May 1958 – 1 February 1963
- 4200d Strategic Reconnaissance Wing: 1 January 1965 – 25 June 1966

Groups

- 15th Pursuit Group, 1 December 1940 – 23 January 1942
- 18th Pursuit Group, 1 November 1940 – 23 January 1942
- 44th Bombardment Group, 13 September 1943 – 14 June 1945 (detached 19 September-c. 18 October 1943)
- 94th Bombardment Group, 16 June-8 August 1945
- 307th Air Refueling Group, 1 July 1977 – 1 October 1983
- 385th Bombardment Group, 16 June-8 August 1945
- 392d Bombardment Group, 13 September 1943 – 14 June 1945
- 447th Bombardment Group, 16 June-c. 1 August 1945
- 486th Bombardment Group, 16 June–August 1945
- 487th Bombardment Group, 16 June-c. 26 August 1945
- 490th Bombardment Group, c. July–August 1945
- 491st Bombardment Group, 15 August 1944-c. 28 June 1945
- 492d Bombardment Group, 12 March-5 August 1944

Squadrons

- 23d Pursuit Squadron: attached 5 October 1941 – 23 January 1942
- 91st Air Refueling Squadron: 1 April-1 August 1972
- 916th Air Refueling Squadron: 25 July 1968 – 31 March 1970; 1 April 1972 – 1 July 1977

=== Stations ===
- Wheeler Field, Hawaii, 1 November 1940
- Fort Shafter, Hawaii, 17 December 1941 – 23 January 1942
- MacDill Field, Florida, 1 October 1942 – May 1943
- Camp Lynn, High Wycombe, England, 1 June 1943
- RAF Hethel, England, 4 June 1943
- Camp Thomas, Old Patton, England, c. 1 July 1943

- RAF Shipdham, England, 13 September 1943
- RAF Bury St Edmunds, England, 13 June-26 August 1945
- McChord Field, Washington, 6 September-7 November 1945
- Travis Air Force Base, California, 10 February 1951 – 16 June 1952; 16 June 1952 – 25 January 1960
- Beale Air Force Base, California, 25 January 1960 – 1 September 1991

=== Aircraft and Missiles ===
- A-12 Shrike, 1940–1941;
- B-12, 1940–1941;
- BT-9, 1940;
- OA-3 Dolphin, 1940;
- OA-8, 1940–1942;
- Grumman OA-9 Goose, 1940–1941;
- Boeing P-26 Peashooter, 1940–1941;
- Curtiss P-36 Hawk, 1940–1941;
- Bell P-39 Airacobra, 1940–1942.
- North American AT-6 Texan, 1941–1942;
- Douglas B-18 Bolo, 1941–1942;
- Republic P-47, 1941–1942;
- Curtiss P-40 Warhawk, 1941–1942.
- Consolidated B-24 Liberator, 1943–1945;
- Boeing B-17 Flying Fortress, 1945.
- Boeing B-29 Superfortress, 1951–1953;
- Boeing RB-29 Superfortress, 1951;

- Convair RB-36 Peacemaker, 1951–1955, 1955–1958;
- Convair B-36 Peacemaker, 1955–1958;
- Boeing B-52 Stratofortress, 1958–1971, 1972–1991;
- Boeing KC-135 Stratotanker, 1959–1991;
- SM-68 (later LGM-25) Titan I, 1962–1965;
- Northrop T-38 Talon, 1965–1966;
- Lockheed SR-71 Blackbird, 1966–1991;
- Ryan AQM-34 Firebee, 1971–1972;
- Sikorsky CH-3, 1971–1972;
- Lockheed DC-130 Hercules, 1971–1972;
- Boeing EC-135 ARIA, 1971–1976, 1986–1991;
- Boeing RC-135 Rivet Joint, 1971–1976, 1986–1991;
- Lockheed U-2, 1971–1972, 1976–1991;
- Boeing E-4 "Nightwatch", 1975–1976, 1986–1991;
- Lockheed TR-1, 1982–1991;
- TC-135, 1986–1991

== See also ==
- List of United States Air Force air divisions
- Organization of United States Air Force Units in the Gulf War
