= RAF Attlebridge =

Former Royal Air Force base in Norfolk

RAF Attlebridge USAAF Station 120
- Near Norwich, Norfolk in England
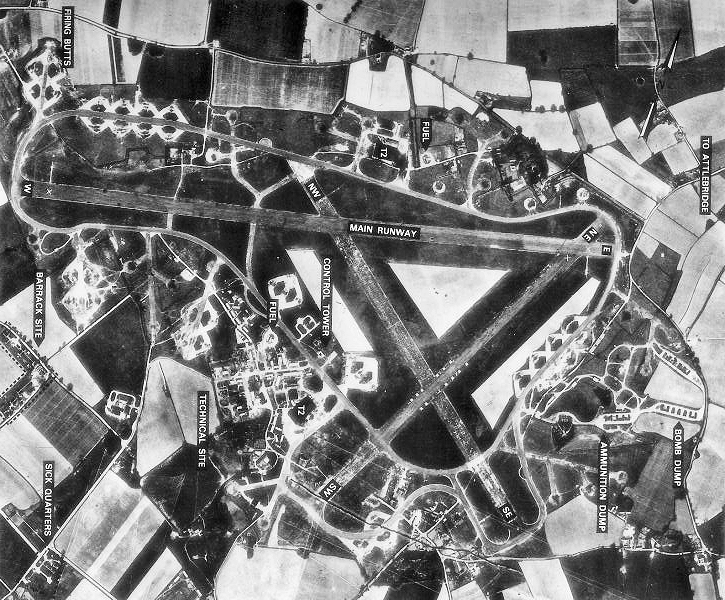
- Aerial Photo of Attlebridge Airfield - 15 April 1946

Site information
- Type: Royal Air Force station Satellite station 1941-43
- Code: AT
- Owner: Air Ministry
- Operator: Royal Air Force; United States Army Air Forces
- Controlled by: RAF Bomber Command (1941-1942; 1943) * No. 2 Group RAF; Eighth Air Force (1942-1943; 1944-1945); RAF Maintenance Command (1945-1956)

Location
- Shown within Norfolk RAF Attlebridge (the United Kingdom)
- Coordinates: 52°41′32″N 001°06′37″E

Site history
- Built: 1941
- Built by: Richard Costain Ltd
- In use: June 1941-1956
- Battles/wars: European theatre of World War II

Airfield information
- Elevation: 165 feet (50 m) AMSL
Runways
Direction	Length and surface
01/19	1,025 metres (3,363 ft) Concrete
08/26	1,830 metres (6,004 ft) Concrete
16/34	985 metres (3,232 ft) Concrete

Royal Air Force Attlebridge or simply RAF Attlebridge is a former Royal Air Force station located near Attlebridge and 8 miles (13 km) northwest of Norwich, Norfolk, England.

== History ==
Attlebridge airfield had runways of 1,220, 1,120 and 1,080 yards in length but, when the base was earmarked for USAAF use, these were extended and the airfield was enlarged to meet heavy bomber requirements. The main E-W runway was increased to 2,000 yards and the others to 1,400 yards each. The perimeter track was also extended and the number of hardstands was increased to fifty. In enlarging the airfield, several small, country roads were closed in the parish of Weston Longville, in which the larger part of the airfield was sited.

=== RAF Bomber Command use ===
Attlebridge was an early wartime station, laid out for use by No. 2 Group RAF light bombers, and was completed in August 1942. The airfield was used by No. 88 Squadron RAF from August 1941 to September 1942 using Bristol Blenheim IVs and Douglas Bostons.

=== United States Army Air Forces use ===
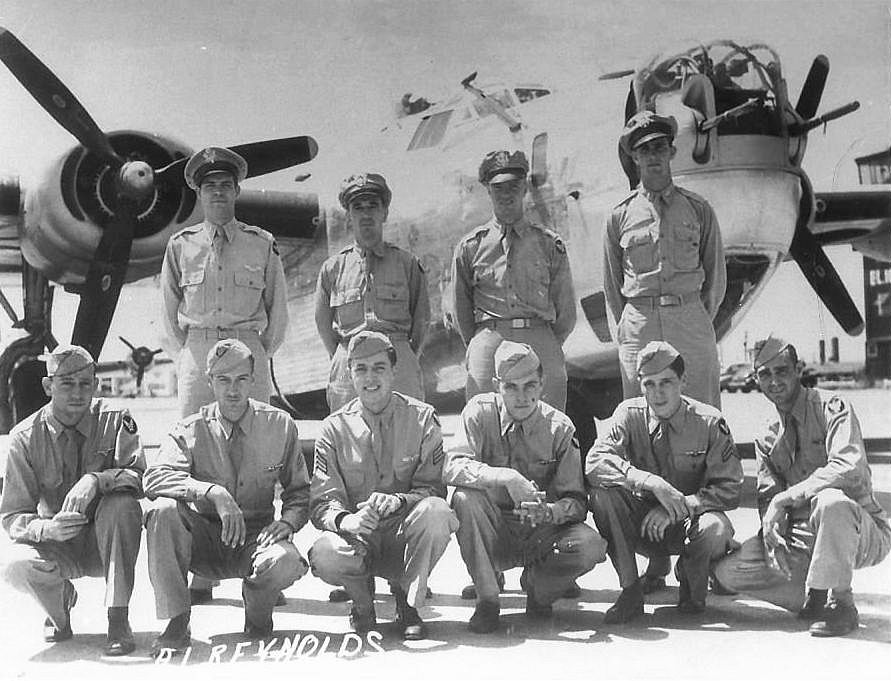
Crew #562 Albert L. Reynolds Crew 785th Bombardment Squadron, 1944

Attlebridge was assigned to the United States Army Air Forces (USAAF) Eighth Air Force's 2nd Bomb Wing on 30 September 1942. It was given USAAF designation Station 120.

USAAF Station Units assigned to RAF Attlebridge were:

- 472rd Sub-Depot (VIII Air Force Service Command)
- 18th Weather Squadron
- 61st Station Complement Squadron

Regular Army Station Units included:

- 1233rd Quartermaster Company
- 1452nd Ordnance Supply & Maintenance Company
- 82nd Chemical Company (Air Operations)
- 2104th Engineer Fire Fighting Platoon
- 207th Finance Section

==== 319th Bombardment Group (Medium) ====
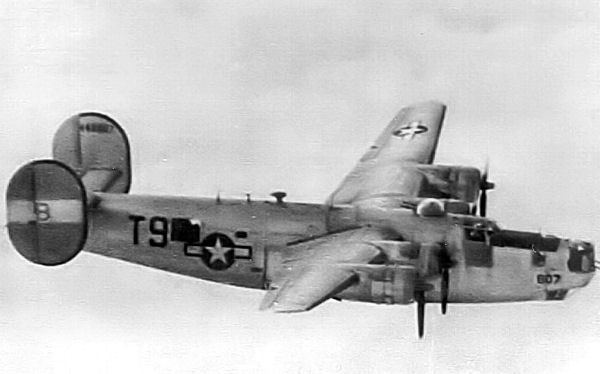
Consolidated B-24J-20-FO Liberator Serial 44-48807 of the 784th Bomb Squadron

The first American flying units at Attlebridge were squadrons of the 319th Bombardment Group (Medium) flying Martin B-26 Marauders which arrived at Attlebridge on 12 September 1942 from Harding Field, Louisiana.

The airfield was then a satellite field for RAF Horsham St. Faith where the Group HQ and some personnel were stationed. These were the first squadrons flying this type of medium bomber to arrive in the UK from America.

The Marauders moved out during November to St-Leu, Algeria as part of Twelfth Air Force, and Attlebridge was used by a training airfield with a few Consolidated B-24 Liberator aircraft.

No. 320 (Dutch) Squadron RAF, moved in during March 1943 flying North American B-25 Mitchells departing in February 1944.

==== 466th Bombardment Group (Heavy) ====
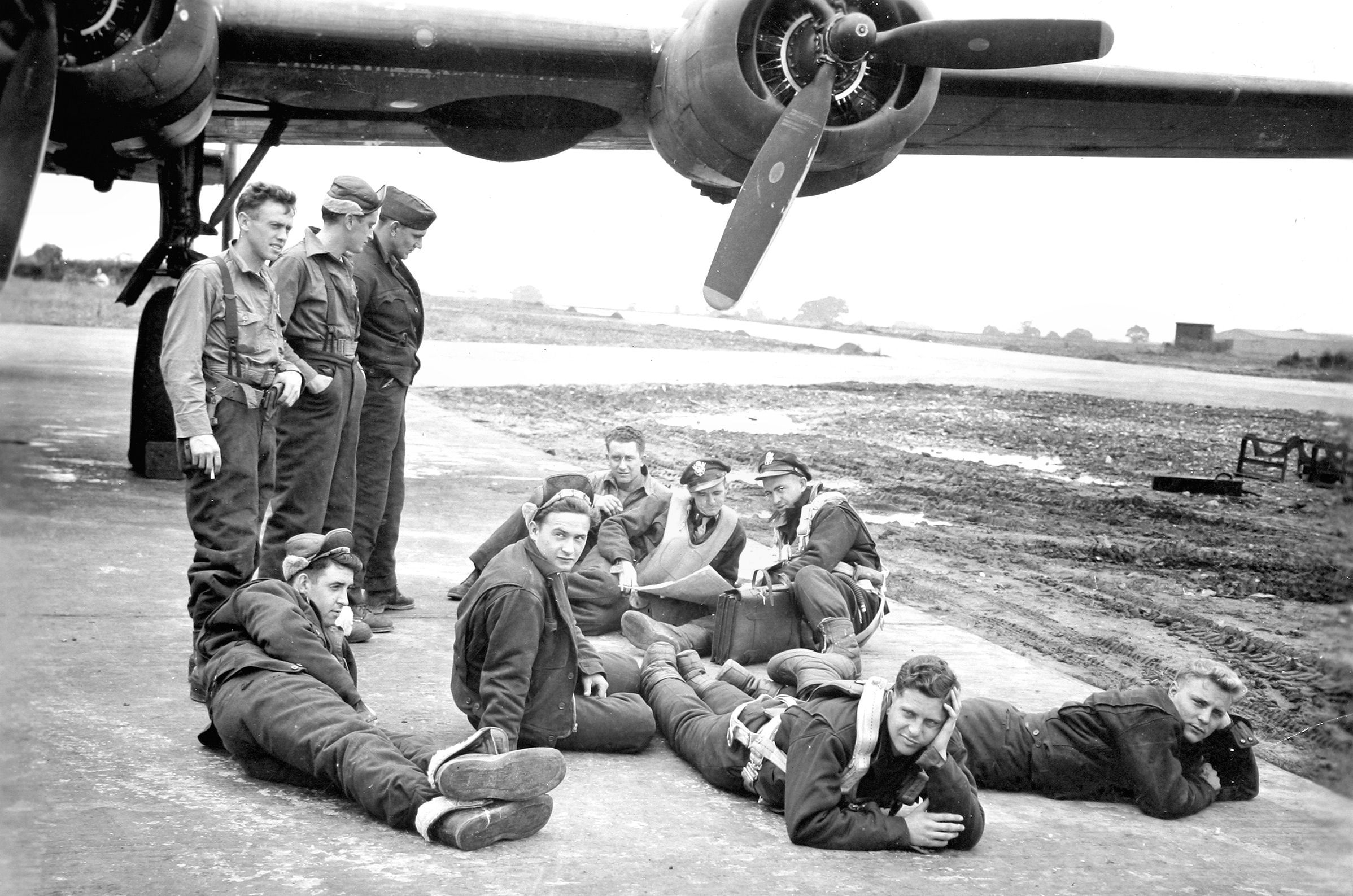
466TH BOMB GROUP, 786th Sq, Dougherty Crew # 612. While waiting for a delayed mission, crew members were taking it easy when a jeep rolled up and a photographer took this picture.

The airfield was opened on 7 March 1944 and was used by the United States Army Air Forces Eighth Air Force 466th Bombardment Group (Heavy), arriving from Topeka Army Air Field, Kansas. The 466th was assigned to the 96th Combat Bombardment Wing, and the group tail code was a "Circle-L". Its operational squadrons were:

- 784th Bombardment Squadron (T9)
- 785th Bombardment Squadron (2U)
- 786th Bombardment Squadron (U8)
- 787th Bombardment Squadron (6L)

The group flew the Consolidated B-24 Liberator as part of the Eighth Air Force's strategic bombing campaign.

The 466th began operations on 22 March 1944 by participating in a daylight raid on Berlin. The group operated primarily as a strategic bombardment organization, attacking such targets as marshalling yards at Liège, an airfield at St Trond, a repair and assembly plant at Reims, an airfield at Chartres, factories at Brunswick, oil refineries at Bohlen, aircraft plants at Kempten, mineral works at Hamburg, marshalling yards at Saarbrücken, a synthetic oil plant at Misburg, a fuel depot at Dülmen, and aero engine works at Eisenach.

Other operations included attacking pillboxes along the coast of Normandy on D-Day (6 June 1944), and afterwards striking interdictory targets behind the beachhead; bombing enemy positions at Saint-Lô during the Allied breakthrough in July 1944; hauling oil and petrol to Allied forces advancing across France in September; hitting German communications and transportation during the Battle of the Bulge, December 1944 − January 1945; and bombing the airfield at Nordhorn in support of the airborne assault across the Rhine on 24 March 1945.

The 466th flew last combat mission on 25 April 1945, striking a transformer station at Traunstein. The unit returned to Sioux Falls Army Air Field, South Dakota in July and was redesignated the 466th Bombardment Group (Very Heavy) in August 1945 and was equipped with Boeing B-29 Superfortresses.

== Current use ==
After the war, RAF Attlebridge was placed in "care and maintenance" status for a few years, eventually being closed in 1956. It was sold during 1959-62 and was chosen as a site for extensive poultry rearing operations.

Today, rows of turkey houses line the runways, isolated from each other because this is an important requirement in escaping the infectious diseases to which turkeys are prone. The runways, perimeter track, and a few of the hardstands remain as does the control tower, now extensively renovated and used as offices by the owners of the airfield site. The briefing room and HQ block still exist, the latter being used as a private house.

The T-2 hangars have long since gone but a few of the old Nissen huts and other structures remain on some of the dispersed sites, used for a variety of purposes.

During the 1992 reunion a memorial was dedicated at a crossroads near the airfield.

== Units assigned ==
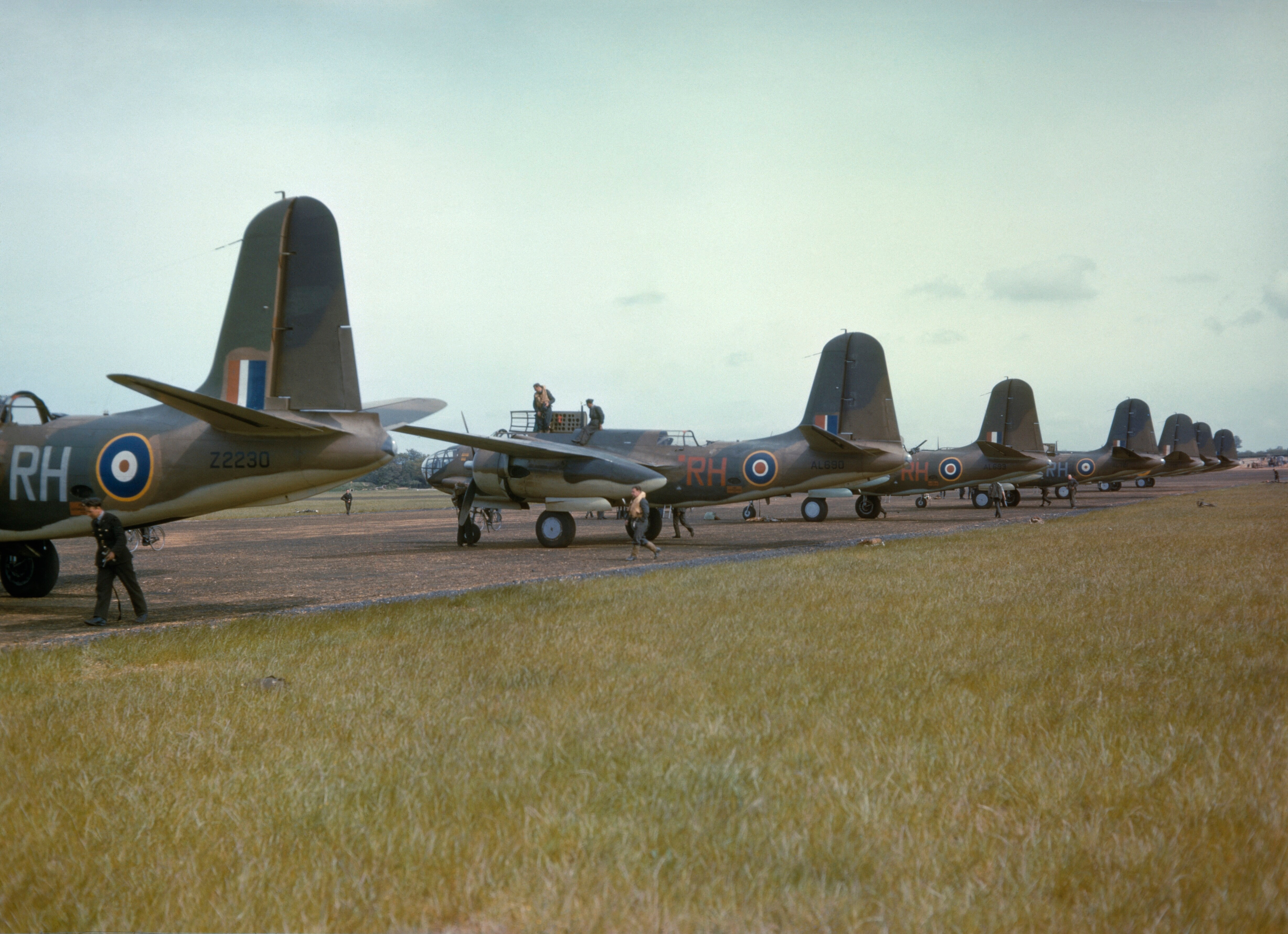
No. 88 Squadron RAF Boston IIIs at Attlebridge.

Royal Air Force

- No. 88 (Hong Kong) Squadron RAF (1 Aug 1941 - 29 Sep 1942)
- No. 320 (Netherlands) Squadron RAF (30 Mar - 30 Aug 1942)
- No. 247 (China-British) Squadron RAF (7 - 13 Aug 1943)
- Sub site of No. 94 Maintenance Unit RAF (January 1948 - October 1956)
- No. 105 Squadron RAF
- No. 121 Airfield Headquarters RAF (August - October 1943)
- Sub site of No. 231 Maintenance Unit RAF (July 1945 - January 1948)
- No. 1508 (Beam Approach Training) Flight RAF (April - October 1943)
- No. 3209 Servicing Commando
- No. 4190 Anti-Aircraft Flight RAF Regiment

United States Army Air Forces

- 319th Bombardment Group (12 September 1942 - November 1942)
- 466th Bombardment Group (7 March 1944 – 6 July 1945)

== See also ==
- List of former Royal Air Force stations
