= 2nd Air Division =

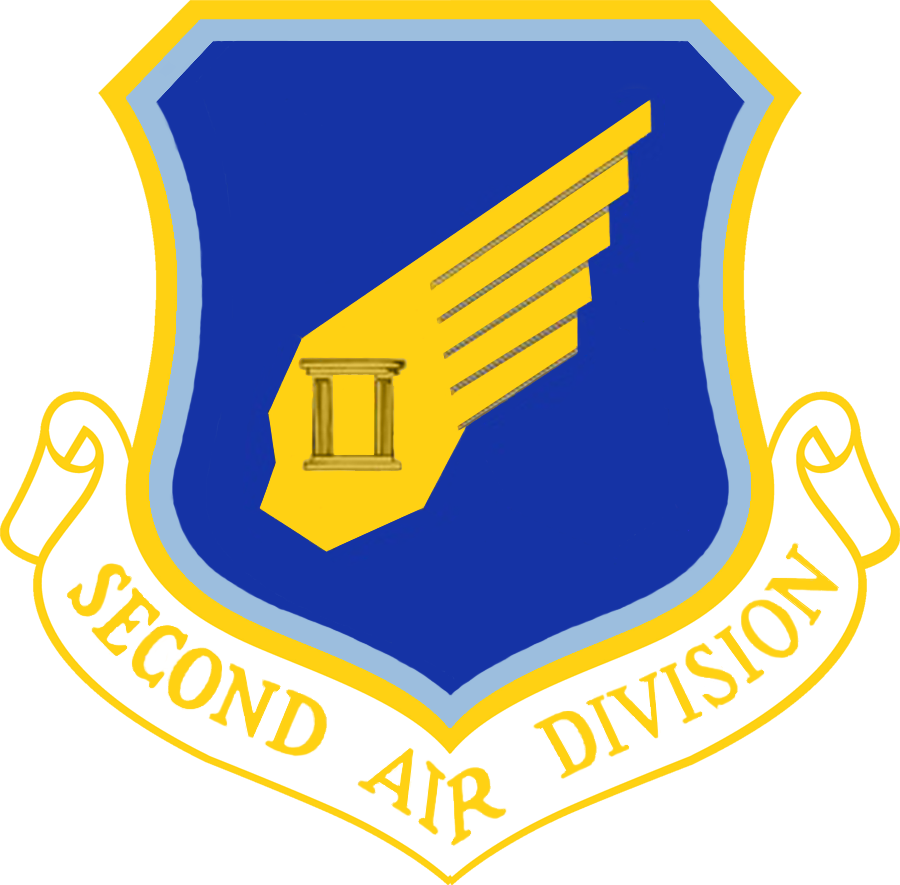
- 2nd Air Division emblem
- Active: 30 August 1943 – 7 May 1951; 20 April 1953 – 1 April 1962; 10 September 1962 – 1 April 1966; 1 March 1983 – 1 February 1987
- Country: United States of America
- Branch: United States Air Force
- Garrison/HQ: see "Stations" section below
- Equipment: see "Aircraft / Missiles / Space Vehicles" section below
- Decorations: see "Lineage and Honors" section below

The 2nd Air Division (2nd AD) is an inactive United States Air Force organization. Its last assignment was with Military Airlift Command, assigned to Twenty-Third Air Force, being stationed at Hurlburt Field, Florida. It started operations on 7 November 1942 as 2nd Bomb Wing and was reorganized as the 2nd Bomb Division on 13 September 1943 before its final designation as the 2nd Air Division in January 1945. It was last inactivated on 1 February 1987.

== History ==
=== World War Two ===
The 2nd Air Division came into being following the reorganisation of the VIII Bomber Command as the Eighth Air Force. It conducted strategic bombardment of Axis targets in Europe, alongside missions to airdrop supplies. Between 29 August 1944 and 2 October 1944 division aircraft dropped food to the French population in liberated areas. It also airdropped food, equipment, and supplies to Allied forces engaged in the airborne attack on the Netherlands (September 1944), as well as troops engaged in the assault across the Rhine River (March 1945). The division continued operations until the end of the war, flying the last combat sortie on 25 April 1945.

The group completed 493 operational missions in Europe during World War Two consisting of 95,948 individual aircraft sorties. The 2nd Air Division operated the Consolidated B-24 Liberator aircraft from airfields in Norfolk, England. Within the 2nd Air Division, six groups received presidential citations for outstanding actions. Five airmen received the highest US award for bravery, the Medal of Honor, and four of them posthumously. A total of 1,458 B-24 aircraft were lost in action and 6,700 men lost their lives.

=== Cold War ===
From January 1949 to May 1951, West Germany it participated in numerous training exercises. Activated in April 1953, it remained unmanned and existed in name until moving in March 1954 to Dhahran Airfield, Saudi Arabia where it remained until the Saudi government terminated US rights to the field in 1962.

==== Vietnam War ====
The 2nd Air Division was organized in Saigon at Tan Son Nhut Air Base in October 1962 under the authority of the Military Assistance Command, Vietnam to control local USAF operations. From December 1962, it controlled all activities and units in Southeast Asia, initially, USAF tactical forces FARM GATE C/H- 47, B/RB-26, T-28, and U-10 counterinsurgency forces, and MULE TRAIN C-123 assault airlift forces. Forces assigned and attached to the 2nd Air Division trained Vietnamese Air Force (VNAF) and Royal Thai Air Force personnel, flew reconnaissance, airlift, and defoliation missions, and operated a tactical control system. Until the build-up of American forces in 1965, the 2nd Air Division provided air support to the forces of the Army of the Republic of Vietnam. Escalation of fighting in South Vietnam in early 1965 brought new offensive assignments. On 8 February 1965 USAF and VNAF aircraft assaulted targets north of the demilitarized zone in the first of a series of continuing strikes. On 19 February 1965, USAF F-100 Super Sabres and B-57 Canberras attacked the Viet Cong inside South Vietnam, the first use of jets for such offensive actions. In July 1965, a major reorganization of the division saw tactical fighter wings established at Bien Hoa Air Base and Danang Air Base, and five separate combat support groups at other South Vietnamese bases. The rapid expansion of the division's personnel and facilities continued well into 1966, with a matching expansion in both the volume and variety of air operations.

Originally, the unit consisted of propeller-driven aircraft, but the build-up in US forces saw the arrival of jet aircraft and, by the end of 1965, the US had deployed nearly 500 US combat aircraft in South Vietnam. On 1 April 1966, the division's resources were absorbed by the newly activated Seventh Air Force; and by this time it consisted of nearly 1,000 aircraft and approximately 30,000 personnel.

=== Special Operations ===
2nd Air Division aircrews received an important role in the vice president's South Florida Drug Task Force. Aircrews from the 20th SOS helped curb the flow of illegal drugs into the United States through the Bahamas in Operation BAT (Bahamas and Turks) by transporting Bahamian authorities and American drug enforcement agents to sites of drug action. In almost two and a half years, the squadron flew more than 1,100 sorties which supported the capture or destruction of more than $1.5 billion in drugs, vessels, aircraft, equipment and weapons. During the operation, one 20th SOS UH-1N helicopter crashed at sea resulting in the death of three squadron members.

In late October 1983, the 2nd AD provided three AC-130H Spectre gunships and five MC-130E Combat Talons to support Operation Urgent Fury on the island of Grenada, off the coast of Venezuela. The U.S. government considered Americans, primarily medical students studying in Grenada, in imminent danger from anti-American elements. The U.S. organized a joint task force of Air Force, Army, Navy and Marine elements to expedite their rescue with the 1st SOW aircraft leading the air assault.

From March 1983 to February 1987, 2nd Air Division forces, with worldwide responsibilities and assignments, engaged in deployment, exercise and training programs. Subordinate units flew drug interdiction missions under Operation BAT.

== Lineage ==
- Established as 2nd Bombardment Division on 30 August 1943

Activated on 13 September 1943
Redesignated 2nd Air Division on 19 December 1944
Disestablished on 28 August 1945.

- Reestablished on 14 January 1949

Organized on 1 June 1949
Discontinued on 7 May 1951.

- Activated on 20 April 1953

Discontinued, and inactivated, on 1 April 1962.

- Activated on 10 September 1962

Organized on 8 October 1962
Discontinued, and inactivated, on 1 April 1966.

- Activated on 1 March 1983

Inactivated on 1 February 1987

== Assignments ==
- VIII Bomber Command (later, Eighth Air Force), 13 September 1943

Attached to 96th Combat Bombardment Wing, 1 June 1945 – c.24 June 1945

- Army Service Forces, 25 June 1945 – 2 July 1945
- Continental Air Service

Second Air Force, c.3 July 1945 – 28 August 1945.

- United States Air Forces in Europe, 1 June 1949

Twelfth Air Force, 21 January 1951 – 7 May 1951.
Twelfth Air Force, 20 April 1953
Seventeenth Air Force, 1 March 1954

- United States Air Forces in Europe, 15 April 1955 – 1 April 1962.
- Pacific Air Forces, 10 September 1962

Thirteenth Air Force, 8 October 1962

- Pacific Air Forces, 8 July 1965 – 1 April 1966.
- Military Airlift Command

Twenty-Third Air Force, 1 March 1983 – 1 February 1987.

== Components ==
Wings:

- World War II

2nd Combat Bombardment: 13 September 1943 – 1 June 1945

Detached 16 September 1943 – 4 October 1943

14th Combat Bombardment: 13 September 1943 – 1 June 1945.
20th Combat Bombardment: 23 September 1943 – 1 June 1945.
65th Fighter: 15 September 1944 – 1 June 1945.
93rd Combat Bombardment: 1 November 1943 – c.10 January 1944

Not operational entire period

95th Combat Bombardment: 12 December 1943 – 1 June 1945

Not operational, 12 December 1943 – 31 March 1944 and 15 August 1944 – 1 June 1945

96th Combat Bombardment: 11 January 1944 – 1 June 1945.
201st Provisional Combat

Attached 13 September 1943 – 14 September 1943 (not operational).

202nd Provisional Combat

Attached 13 September 1943 – 14 September 1943 (not operational).

- Vietnam War

2nd Tactical Fighter: 8 November 1966 – 1 April 1966.
3rd Tactical Fighter: 8 November 1965 – 1 April 1966.
8th Tactical Fighter: attached 8 December 1965 – 31 March 1966.
14th Air Commando: 8 March 1966 – 1 April 1966.
315th Air Commando: attached 8 March 1966 – 31 March 1966.
55th Tactical Fighter: attached 8 November 1965 – 31 March 1966.
366th Tactical Fighter: 20 March 1966 – 31 March 1966.
460th Tactical Reconnaissance: 18 February 1966 – 1 April 1966.
6234th Tactical Fighter: attached 8 July 1965 – 1 April 1966.
6251st Tactical Fighter: 8 July 1965 – 18 February 1966.
6252nd Tactical Fighter: 8 July 1965 – 1 April 1966.
6234th Tactical Fighter Provisional: attached 5 April 1965 – 8 July 1965.
6235th Tactical Fighter Provisional: attached 8 April 1965 – 8 July 1965 (not operational).

- Other Periods

1st Special Operations: 1 March 1983 – 1 February 1987
36th Fighter (later, 36th Fighter Bomber)

Attached 6 September 1949 – 17 September 1949 and 28 September 1949 – 1 October 1949
Assigned 10 October 1949 – 7 May 1951.

86th Fighter (later, 86th Fighter Bomber)

Attached 6 September 1949 – 17 September 1949 and 28 September 1949 – 1 October 1949
Assigned 10 October 1949 – 7 May 1951.

Groups:

- World War II

355th Fighter: 15 September 1944 – c. January 1945.
492nd Bombardment: attached c.21 September 1944 – 2 October 1944.
496th Fighter Training: attached c.1 December 1944 – 12 April 1945.

- Vietnam War

33rd Tactical: 8 July 1963 – 8 July 1965
(USAF Advisory Unit at Tan Son Nhut Air Base, South Vietnam)
34th Tactical: 8 July 1963 – 8 July 1965
(USAF Advisory Unit at Bien Hoa Air Base, South Vietnam)
35th Tactical: 8 July 1963 – 8 July 1965
(USAF Advisory Unit at Don Muang Royal Thai Air Force Base for all USAF forces in Thailand)
315th Troop Carrier (later, 315 Air Commando): attached 8 December 1962 – 8 March 1966.
6010th Tactical: 8 December 1962 – 8 July 1963.
6492nd Combat Cargo (Troop Carrier) Provisional: attached 21 September 1962 – 8 December 1962.
6250th Tactical Air Support Provisional: attached 1 August 1965 – 8 November 1965.

== Stations ==
- RAF Horsham St Faith, United Kingdom, 13 September 1943
- Ketteringham Hall, England, 10 December 1943
- London, England, 22 June 1945 – 24 June 1945
- Sioux Falls AAFld, South Dakota, 3 July 1945 – 28 August 1945.
- Wiesbaden Army Airfield, West Germany, 1 June 1949
- Landsberg Air Ammunition Depot (later, Landsberg AFB, Landsberg-Lech Air Base), West Germany, 10 June 1949 – 7 May 1951.
- Ramstein (later, Ramstein Air Base), West Germany, 20 April 1953 – 1 March 1954
- Dhahran Airfield, Saudi Arabia, 1 March 1954 – 1 April 1962.
- Tan Son Nhut Airfield (later, Tan Son Nhut Air Base), South Vietnam, 8 October 1962 – 1 April 1966.
- Hurlburt Field, Florida, 1 March 1983 – 1 February 1987.

== Aircraft / Missiles / Space Vehicles ==
- B-24 Liberator, 1943–1945;
- P-38 Lightning, 1944;
- P-47 Thunderbolt, 1944–1945;
- P-51 Mustang, 1944–1945;
- OA-10, 1945;
- B-17 Flying Fortress, 1945.
- B/RB-26, 1949;
- C-47 Skytrain, 1949;
- F-47, 1949–1950;
- F-80, 1949–1950;
- L-5 Sentinel, 1949;
- F-84 Thunderjet, 1950–1951.
- B/RB-26, 1962–1965;
- C-47 Skytrain, 1962–1966;
- C-54 Skymaster, 1962–1963;
- C-123 Provider, 1962–1966;
- F-100 Super Sabre, 1962–1966;
- F-101 Voodoo, 1962–1966;
- T-28 Trojan, 1962–1964;
- U-10, 1962–1966;
- B/RB-57, 1963–1965;
- YC-123, 1963;
- F/TF-102, 1963–1965;
- O-1, 1963–1966;
- U-3, 1963–1966;
- A-1 Skyraider, 1964–1966;
- KB-50, 1964;
- C-130 Hercules, 1964–1965;
- F-105 Thunderchief, 1964–1966;
- HH-43 Huskie, 1964–1966;
- HU-16 Albatross, 1964–1966;
- B-57 Canberra, 1965–1966;
- EB-66, 1965–1966;

RB-66, 1965;

- AC-47 Spooky, 1965–1966;
- EC-121, 1965–1966;
- F-4 Phantom II, 1965 1966;

RF-4, 1965–1966;

- F-5 Freedom Fighter, 1965–1966;
- F-104 Starfighter, 1965;
- CH-3, 1965–1966;

HH-3, 1965–1966.

- Lockheed AC-130, 1983–1987;
- MC-130 Combat Talon, 1983–1987;
- HH-53, 1983–1987;
- UH-1 Iroquois, 1983–1987.

== See also ==
- List of United States Air Force air divisions
