= 784th Bombardment Squadron =

784th Bombardment Squadron (later 784th Tactical Air Support Training Squadron)
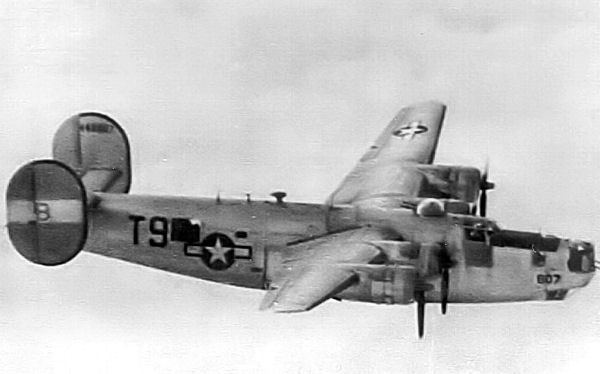
- Squadron B-24 Liberator (Note: The aircraft in the photograph is clearly a squadron airplane. It is identified in the photograph as Consolidated B-24J-180-CO Liberator, serial 44-40807. However, the aircraft's serial number is not clear in the photograph, and Baugher identifies the aircraft with this serial number as assigned to the 758th Bombardment Squadron, a unit in the Mediterranean Theater of Operations. Baugher, Joe (10 June 2023). "1944 USAF Serial Numbers". Joe Baugher.)
- Active: 1943-1945; 1964
- Country: United States
- Branch: United States Air Force
- Role: strategic bombardment
- Engagements: European Theater of Operations

Insignia
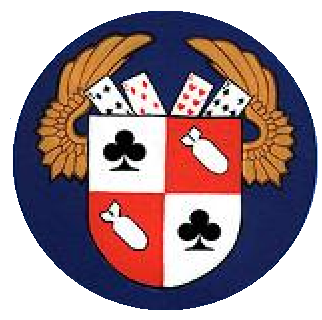
- 784th Bombardment Squadron emblem
- World War II fuselage code: T9

The 784th Bombardment Squadron is the senior predecessor of the 784th Tactical Air Support Training Squadron. It was organized in August 1943 as a heavy bomber unit. After training in the United States with Consolidated B-24 Liberators, the 784th moved to England, where it participated in the strategic bombing campaign against Germany. Following V-E Day, it returned to the United States, where it began training with Boeing B-29 Superfortresses, but was inactivated in October 1945.

The unit's second predecessor is the 784th Tactical Fighter Squadron, which was briefly active at George Air Force Base, California in 1964. The two inactive squadrons were consolidated in September 1985, but the consolidated 784th Tactical Air Support Training Squadron has never been active.

== History ==
=== World War II ===
==== Training in the United States ====
The 784th Bombardment Squadron was activated at Alamogordo Army Air Field on 1 August 1943 as one of the four original squadrons of the 466th Bombardment Group. After training there with Consolidated B-24 Liberators, the squadron departed for the European Theater of Operations in February 1944. The ground echelon proceeded to the port of embarkation for transport to Europe by ship, while the air echelon ferried their Liberators via the South Atlantic Ferry route.

==== Combat in Europe ====
The squadron arrived at its combat station, RAF Attlebridge in England in March 1944. It flew its first combat mission on 22 March in an attack on Berlin, Germany. It engaged primarily in the strategic bombing campaign against Germany, with targets that included oil refineries and facilities at Bohlen and Misburg, marshalling yards at Liège and Saarbrücken, factories at Brunswick, Kempten and Eisenach, repair facilities at Reims, mining facilities near Hamburg and airfields at Saint-Trond and Chartres.

The squadron also flew air support and air interdiction missions. It attacked pillboxes in Normandy on D-Day to support Operation Overlord and performed interdiction missions against targets beyond the beachhead in the following days. During Operation Cobra, the breakout at Saint Lo in July, it bombed German positions in the city. It attacked lines of communication during the Battle of the Bulge in December 1944 and January 1945. On 24 March 1945, it supported Operation Varsity, the airborne assault across the Rhine by attacking a military air base at Nordhorn. The squadron's last mission of the war was flown on 25 April 1945 against electrical facilities at Traunstein.

==== Return to the United States and inactivation ====
Following V-E Day, the squadron returned to the United States. The air echelon began flying their B-24s back to the United States in the middle of June, while the ground echelon sailed aboard the RMS Queen Mary on 6 July. The squadron reassembled at Sioux Falls Army Air Field, South Dakota in late July 1945. In August, the squadron moved to Davis-Monthan Field, Arizona to begin training with the Boeing B-29 Superfortress. However, with the surrender of Japan, the squadron was inactivated in October as Davis-Monthan transitioned from a training base to a storage facility.

=== Tactical fighter training ===
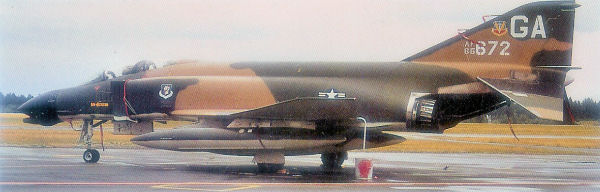
An F-4 at George AFB

The squadron's other predecessor, the 784th Tactical Fighter Squadron, was activated at George Air Force Base, California in April 1964 as an element of the 32d Tactical Fighter Wing. The unit began training with the McDonnell F-4 Phantom II, when the Air Force decided to replace the 32d Wing with the 8th Tactical Fighter Wing, which moved on paper to George from Japan. The squadron inactivated and its personnel and equipment were transferred to the 68th Tactical Fighter Squadron.

The two squadrons were consolidated as the 784th Tactical Air Support Training Squadron on 19 September 1985.

== Lineage ==
784th Bombardment Squadron

- Constituted as the 784th Bombardment Squadron (Heavy) on 19 May 1943

Activated on 1 August 1943
Redesignated 784th Bombardment Squadron, Heavy in 1944
Redesignated 784th Bombardment Squadron, Very Heavy on 5 August 1945
Inactivated on 17 October 1945

- Consolidated with the 784th Tactical Fighter Squadron as the 784th Tactical Air Support Training Squadron on 19 September 1985

784th Tactical Air Support Training Squadron

- Constituted as the 784th Tactical Fighter Squadron on 6 April 1964

Activated on 1 April 1964
Inactivated on 25 July 1964

- Consolidated with the 784th Bombardment Squadron as the 784th Tactical Air Support Training Squadron on 19 September 1985

=== Assignments ===
- 466th Bombardment Group, 1 August 1943 – 17 October 1945
- 32d Tactical Fighter Wing, 1 April–25 July 1964

=== Stations ===
- Alamogordo Army Air Field, New Mexico, 1 August 1943
- Kearns Army Air Base, Utah 31 August 1943
- Alamogordo Army Air Field, New Mexico, 24 November 1943 – 10 February 1944
- RAF Attlebridge (AAF-120), England 9 March 1944 – c. 6 July 1945
- Sioux Falls Army Air Field, South Dakota, 15 July 1945
- Pueblo Army Air Base, Colorado, 25 July 1945
- Davis-Monthan Field, Arizona, 26 August–17 October 1945
- George Air Force Base, California, 1 April–25 July 1964

=== Aircraft ===
- Consolidated B-24 Liberator, 1943–1945
- Boeing B-29 Superfortress, 1945
- McDonnell F-4 Phantom II, 1964

=== Campaigns ===
Campaign Streamer	Campaign	Dates	Notes
	Air Offensive, Europe	9 March 1944 – 5 June 1944	784th Bombardment Squadron
	Air Combat, EAME Theater	9 March 1944 – 11 May 1945	784th Bombardment Squadron
	Normandy	6 June 1944 – 24 July 1944	784th Bombardment Squadron
	Northern France	25 July 1944 – 14 September 1944	784th Bombardment Squadron
	Rhineland	15 September 1944 – 21 March 1945	784th Bombardment Squadron
	Ardennes-Alsace	16 December 1944 – 25 January 1945	784th Bombardment Squadron
	Central Europe	22 March 1944 – 21 May 1945	784th Bombardment Squadron
