= 96th Air Division =

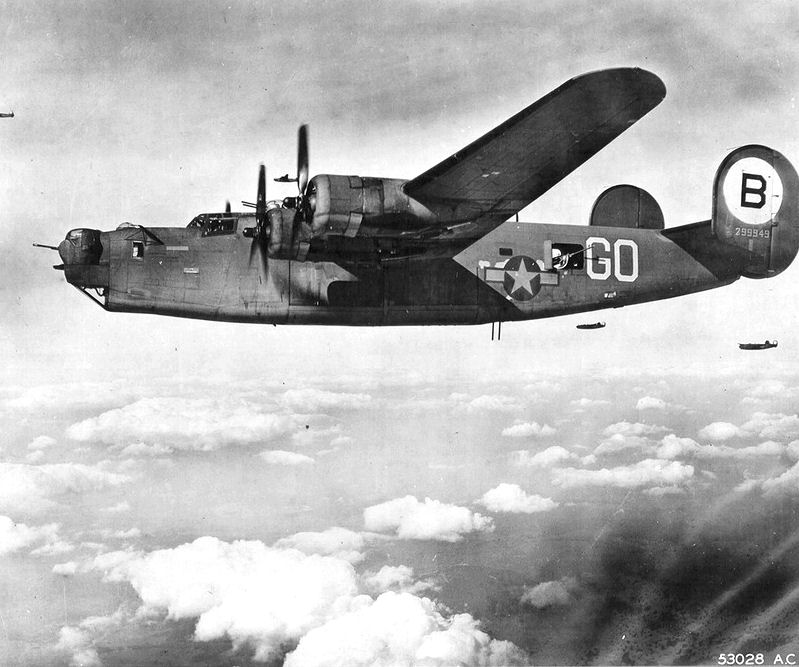
- B-24 Liberators of the 96th Combat Bombardment Wing's 93d Bombardment Group
- Active: 1944–1945; 1947–1949
- Country: United States
- Branch: United States Air Force
- Engagements: European Theater of World War II

Insignia
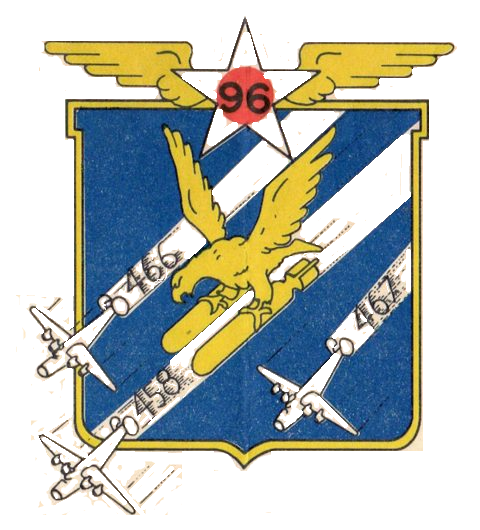
- 96th Combat Bombardment Wing emblem

The 96th Air Division is an inactive United States Air Force unit. Its last assignment was with the Tenth Air Force at Scott Air Force Base, Illinois, where it was inactivated on 27 June 1949.

As the 96th Bombardment Wing, the unit was one of the primary Consolidated B-24 Liberator heavy strategic bombardment wings of the Eighth Air Force 2d Bombardment Division in World War II.

== History ==
=== World War II ===
The division was first activated at RAF Horsham St Faith, England in January 1944 as the 96th Combat Bombardment Wing. In February, it was assigned to the 2d Bombardment Division, which controlled all of Eighth Air Force's operational Consolidated B-24 Liberator units. Its first assigned group was the 458th Bombardment Group, which had arrived at Horsham St Faith the previous month. The wing's first action took place on 24 February, when the 458th flew a diversionary action to draw German fighters away from the main attacking force.

The 457th was joined the following month by the 466th and 467th Bombardment Groups when they arrived in England. The three groups flew their first combat missions March and April. Later in the year, three more bombardment groups joined the wing.

The wing's units entered the strategic bombing campaign against Germany, bombing oil refineries, marshaling yards, steel plants, and tank factories plus numerous other assorted targets in the European Theater. In September 1944, some of the groups flew gasoline for Army units to airfields in France. Others air-dropped supplies to Allied troops during Operation Market Garden, the airborne attack on the Netherlands that same month. During the Battle of the Bulge, from December 1944 through January 1945, subordinate units of the wing aided Allied ground forces by bombing German lines of communication. Besides strategic bombardment, they also dropped supplies to Allied troops during Operation Varsity, the airborne assault across the Rhine River in March 1945.

Following V-E Day, the squadron was redesignated the 96th Bombardment Wing (Note: This wing is not related to the 96th Bombardment Wing, which was activated in 1953.) and moved to Ketteringham Hall, where it remained until August, with various groups being assigned for short periods as units in England began to draw down. By late July, all combat groups had been reassigned, and in August, the wing returned to the United States and Sioux Falls Army Air Field, South Dakota, but within two days relocated without personnel or equipment to Peterson Field, Colorado, the headquarters of Second Air Force, where it was redesignated as a "Very Heavy" wing, apparently in anticipation of receiving Boeing B-29 Superfortress components, but was not equipped. It remained at Peterson with no combat units assigned until inactivating on 17 October 1945.

=== Air Force reserve ===
The wing was again activated in the reserves under Air Defense Command (ADC) at Scott Field, Illinois in June 1947, but it was not until October that the 381st Bombardment Group at Offutt Air Force Base, Nebraska was assigned to the wing. The 351st Bombardment Group, the reserve flying group at Scott, remained directly assigned to Tenth Air Force until June 1948, when it replaced the 381st as the 96th's only flying group.

In April 1948, as the regular Air Force implemented the wing base organization system, the wing, along with other multi-base reserve wings was redesignated as an air division. In July Continental Air Command assumed responsibility for managing reserve and Air National Guard units from ADC. The 96th participated in routine reserve training under the supervision of the 139th AAF Base Unit (later the 2469th Air Force Reserve Training Center) with its assigned trainer aircraft and supervised the training of its assigned group until it was inactivated in June 1949 when the reserves adopted the wing base organization system. Most of its equipment and personnel, along with that of the 351st Group, were used to form the 419th Troop Carrier Wing, which was simultaneously activated at Scott.

== Lineage ==
- Established as the 96th Combat Bombardment Wing (Heavy) on 8 November 1943

Activated on 11 January 1944
Redesignated 96th Combat Bombardment Wing, Heavy on 7 August 1944
Redesignated 96th Bombardment Wing, Heavy on 9 June 1945
Redesignated 96th Bombardment Wing, Very Heavy on 17 August 1945
Inactivated on 17 October 1945

- Activated in the reserve on 12 June 1947

Redesignated 96th Air Division, Bombardment on 16 April 1948
Inactivated on 27 June 1949

=== Assignments ===
- Eighth Air Force, 11 January 1944
- 2d Bombardment Division (later 2d Air Division), 22 February 1944
- VIII Fighter Command, 16 July – 6 August 1945
- Army Service Forces, Port of Embarkation, 6 August – c. 14 August 1945
- Second Air Force, c. 14 August–17 October 1945
- Second Air Force, 12 June 1947
- Tenth Air Force, 1 July 1948 – 27 June 1949

=== Components ===
- 44th Bombardment Group, 26 June–24 July 1945
- 93d Bombardment Group, c. 6 June–24 July 1945
- 351st Bombardment Group, 4 June 1948 – 27 June 1949
- 381st Bombardment Group, 17 October 1947 – 4 June 1948
- 392d Bombardment Group, c. 6 July 1944–c. 7 June 1945
- 446th Bombardment Group, 1 June–c. 30 July 1945
- 448th Bombardment Group, 6 July 1944 – 23 July 1945
- 458th Bombardment Group, c. 8 February 1944 – 25 July 1945
- 466th Bombardment Group, c. 14 March 1944-c. 2 October 1945
- 467th Bombardment Group, c. 18 March 1944-c. 17 October 1945
- 491st Bombardment Group, c. 5 May 1944-c. 16 June 1945

=== Stations ===
- RAF Horsham St Faith (AAF 123), England, 11 January 1944
- Ketteringham Hall, England (AAF 147), c. 1 June–c. 5 August 1945
- Sioux Falls Army Air Field, South Dakota, c. 14 August 1945
- Peterson Field, Colorado, 16 August–17 October 1945
- Scott Field (later Scott Air Force Base), Illinois, 12 June 1947 – 27 June 1949

=== Aircraft ===
- Consolidated B-24 Liberator, 1944–1945
- North American AT-6 Texan, 1948–1949
- Beechcraft AT-11, 1948–1949

== See also ==
- List of United States Air Force air divisions
