= 955th Air Expeditionary Squadron =

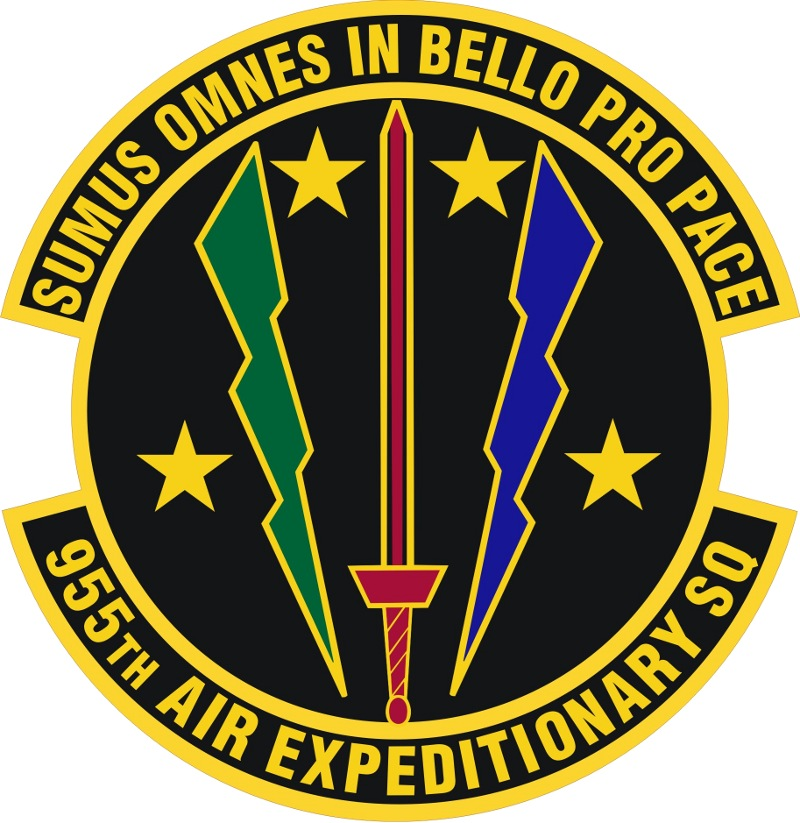
- Active: 2009–present
- Branch: United States Air Force
- Type: Combat & Combat Support
- Role: Joint Expeditionary Tasked (JET) Airmen
- Part of: U.S. Air Force Squadron
- Garrison/HQ: Al Udeid Air Base, Qatar
- Motto(s): "Sumus Omnes in Bello Pro Pace" (All in the Fight For Peace)
- Colors: Black & Blue & Green
- Engagements

Commanders
- Current commander: Lt Col Donald (Don) A. Morris, USAF

The 955th Air Expeditionary Squadron of the United States Air Force performed Operational and Administrative Control (OPCON/ADCON) of Joint Expeditionary Tasking and Individual Augmentee (JET/IA) Airmen in Afghanistan. The squadron is assigned to the 405th Air Expeditionary Group.

== Mission ==
The Air Force set up the 955th Air Expeditionary Squadron (AES) to provide Operational Control (OPCON) and Administrative Control (ADCON) support to assigned Joint Expeditionary Tasking and Individual Augmentee (JET/IA) Airmen under the Tactical Control (TACON) of Coalition and Joint organizations across the world to further Operation FREEDOM'S SENTINEL and NATO's Resolute Support campaign.

== History ==
The 955 AES is now headquartered at Al Udeid, AB, Qatar after having come Over the Horizon from Bagram Airfield (BAF) as part of a tactical realignment of Afghanistan. BAF is a militarized airport and housing complex located next to the ancient mile-high city of Bagram in the Parwan Province of Afghanistan. The base is run by an Army division headed by a two-star general. All the Joint Expeditionary Tasked (JET) and Individual Augmenteer (IA) Airmen assigned to Northern and Eastern Afghanistan are ADCON to the 955 AES. This includes over 510 Airmen at BAF and 400 more at 70 combat outposts and bases.

The "Air" in Airpower represents Airman, not just aircraft. Airmen are an important part of the Air Force's contribution to the Joint mission in Afghanistan. The Air Force has delegated Tactical Control (TACON) over some of its Airmen in critical support billets to a Joint supervisor who may be from any branch of military service. But the Air Force retains ADCON over its Airmen. The Air Force lends its Airmen's skills, talents and temporary service to the Joint team, but Airmen still work for an Air Force Squadron: the 966AES is that squadron for those Airmen in Regional Command-East and Regional Command-North.

The 955th Air Expeditionary Squadron (955 AES), activated 5 May 2009, was redesignated the 966th AES in November 2010. The 766th Air Expeditionary Squadron (766 AES) was moved from Forward Operating Base Sharana and inactivated on 23 March 2011; its mission was folded into the 966 AES.

On 1 June 2016 the 966th Air Expeditionary Squadron was redesignated the 955th Air Expeditionary Squadron and realigned under the 455th Expeditionary Mission Support Group, 455th Air Expeditionary Wing at Bagram Airfield, Afghanistan.

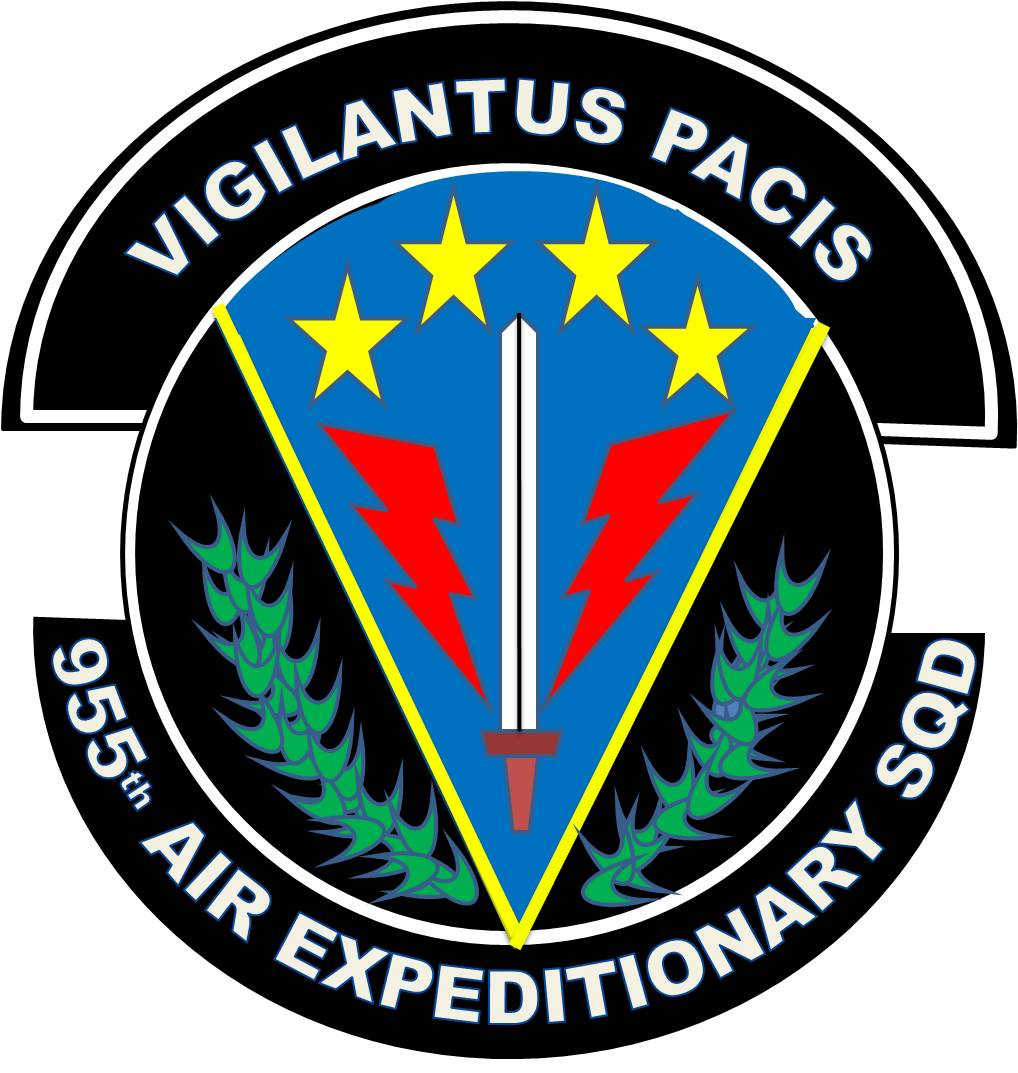

== List of Commanders ==
- Lt Col William E. (Billy) Wade, USAF (May 2009 – May 2010) (955 AES Commander)
- Lt Col Kenneth B. Bowling, USAF (May 2010 – March 2011) (955 AES & 966 AES Commander)
- Lt Col Jeffrey A. Collins, USAF (March 2011 – Dec 2011) (766 AES & 966 AES Commander)
- Lt Col Thomas G. Single, USAF (Dec 2011 – Nov 2012)
- Lt Col William Rondeau, USAF (Nov 2012 – Nov 2013)
- Lt Col Peter Janyska, USAF (Nov 2013 – Oct 2014)
- Lt Col Thomas S. Shields, USAF (Oct 2014 – Oct 2015)
- Lt Col Monique L. Farness, USAF (Oct 2015 – Oct 2016)
- Lt Col Patrick O’Rourke, USAF (Oct 2016 – Oct 2017)
- Lt Col J. Corey Reed, USAF (Oct 2017 – Jul 2018)
- Lt Col Rebb S. Jones, USAF (Jul 2018 – Jun 2019)
- Present Commander, Lt Col Donald (Don) A. Morris, USAF (Jun 2019 – present)

== Unit Locations ==
- Bagram Airfield, Afghanistan (2009 – Mar 2019)
- Al Udeid AB, Qatar (Mar 2019 – present)

== JTOC Record ==
Lt Col Richard Goodman II sustained a continuous JTOC connection for 58:43 minutes on 28 Jun 2014
