= 786th Air Expeditionary Squadron =

786th Air Expeditionary Squadron

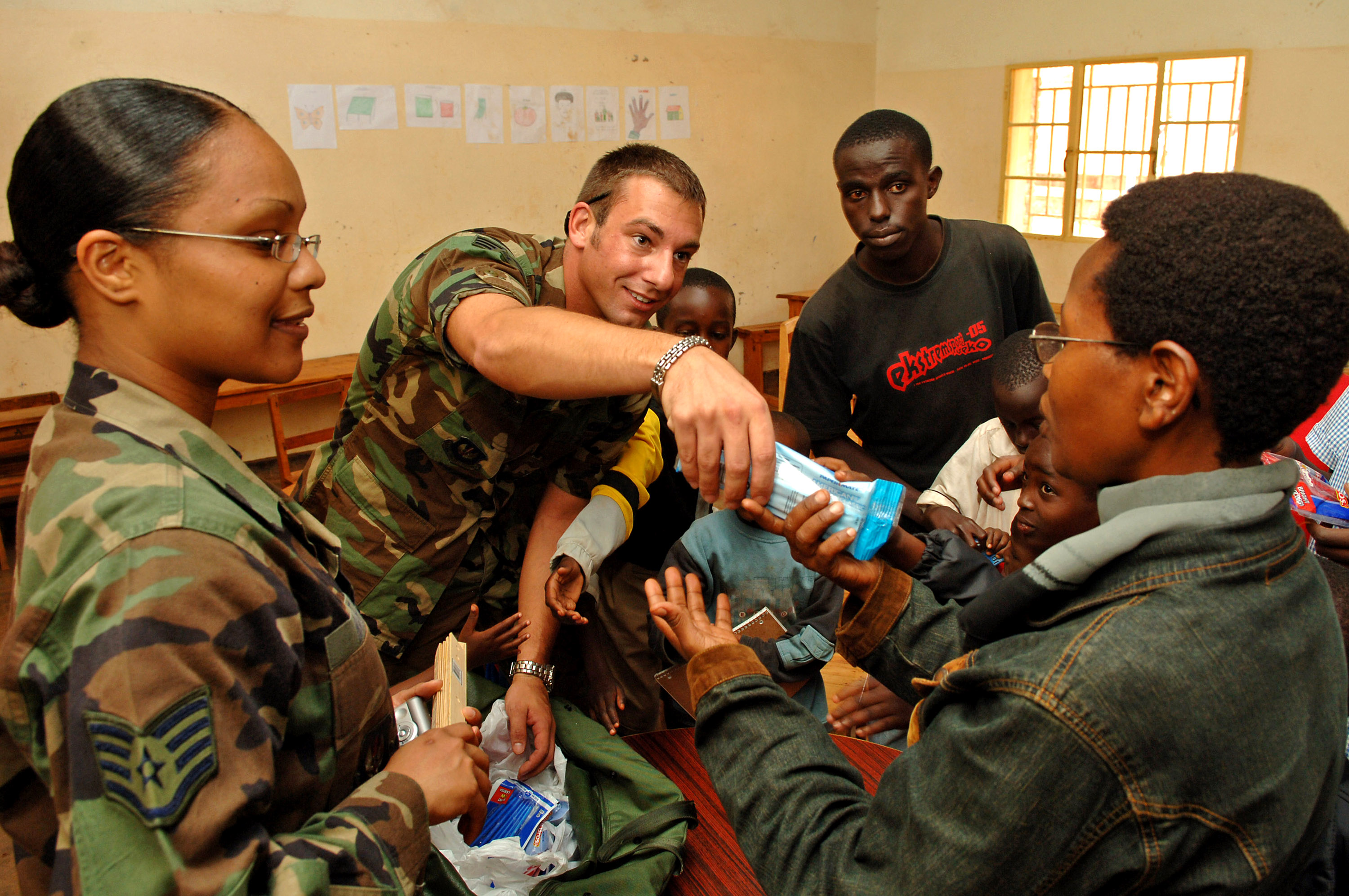
- 786th Air Expeditionary Squadron airmen support Rwandan Defense Force troop rotation
- Active: 1943-1945, 1965; 2006; 2009; 2012
- Country: United States
- Branch: United States Air Force
- Role: Expeditionary operations
- Part of: United States Air Forces Europe
- Engagements: European Theater of Operations

Insignia
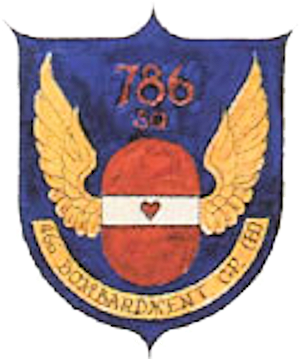
- Patch with unofficial 786th Bombardment Squadron emblem
- World War II fuselage code: U8

The 786th Air Expeditionary Squadron is a provisional unit of the United States Air Force, assigned to United States Air Forces in Europe (USAFE) to activate or inactivate as needed. USAFE has activated the squadron for short periods of contingency operations.

The squadron was first organized in August 1943 as the 786th Bombardment Squadron, a heavy bomber unit. After training in the United States with Consolidated B-24 Liberators, the 786th moved to England, where it participated in the strategic bombing campaign against Germany. Following V-E Day, it returned to the United States, where it began training with Boeing B-29 Superfortresses, but was inactivated in October 1945.

The squadron was briefly active in 1965 as the 786th Tactical Fighter Squadron. While it was training with McDonnell F-4 Phantom IIs, it was inactivated and its assets transferred to another squadron.

== History ==
=== World War II ===
==== Training in the United States ====
The 786th Bombardment Squadron was activated at Alamogordo Army Air Field on 1 August 1943 as one of the four original squadrons of the 466th Bombardment Group. After training there with Consolidated B-24 Liberators, the squadron departed for the European Theater of Operations in February 1944. The ground echelon proceeded to the port of embarkation for transport to Europe by ship, while the air echelon ferried their Liberators via the South Atlantic Ferry route.

==== Combat in Europe ====
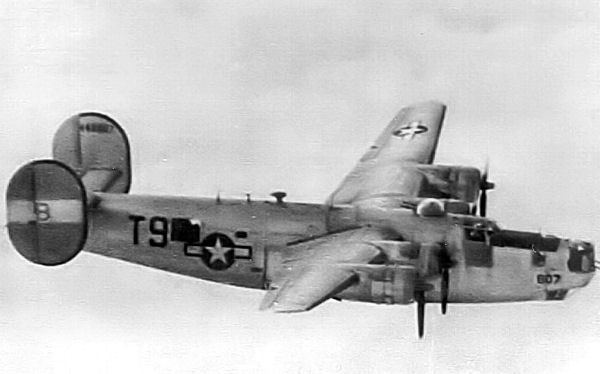
466th Bomb Gp B-24 Liberator (Note: The aircraft in the photograph is clearly a 466th Group airplane, based on its markings. It is identified in the photograph as Consolidated B-24J-180-CO Liberator, serial 44-40807. However, the aircraft's serial number is not clear in the photograph, and Baugher identifies the aircraft with this serial number as assigned to the 758th Bombardment Squadron, a unit in the Mediterranean Theater of Operations. Baugher, Joe (10 June 2023). "1944 USAF Serial Numbers". Joe Baugher.)

The squadron arrived at its combat station, RAF Attlebridge in England in March 1944. It flew its first combat mission on 22 March in an attack on Berlin, Germany. It engaged primarily in the strategic bombing campaign against Germany, with targets that included oil refineries and facilities at Bohlen and Misburg, marshalling yards at Liège and Saarbrücken, factories at Brunswick, Kempten and Eisenach, repair facilities at Reims, mining facilities near Hamburg and airfields at Saint-Trond and Chartres.

The squadron also flew air support and air interdiction missions. It attacked pillboxes in Normandy on D-Day to support Operation Overlord and performed interdiction missions against targets beyond the beachhead in the following days. During Operation Cobra, the breakout at Saint Lo in July, it bombed German positions in the city. It attacked lines of communication during the Battle of the Bulge in December 1944 and January 1945. On 24 March, it supported Operation Varsity, the airborne assault across the Rhine by attacking a military air base at Nordhorn. The squadron's last mission of the war was flown on 25 April 1945 against electrical facilities at Traunstein.

==== Return to the United States and inactivation ====
Following V-E Day, the squadron returned to the United States. The air echelon began flying their B-24s back to the United States in the middle of June, while the ground echelon sailed aboard the RMS Queen Mary on 6 July. The squadron reassembled at Sioux Falls Army Air Field, South Dakota in late July 1945. In August, the squadron moved to Davis-Monthan Field, Arizona to begin training with the Boeing B-29 Superfortress. However with the surrender of Japan, the squadron was inactivated in October as Davis-Monthan transitioned from a training base to a storage facility.

=== Fighter operations ===
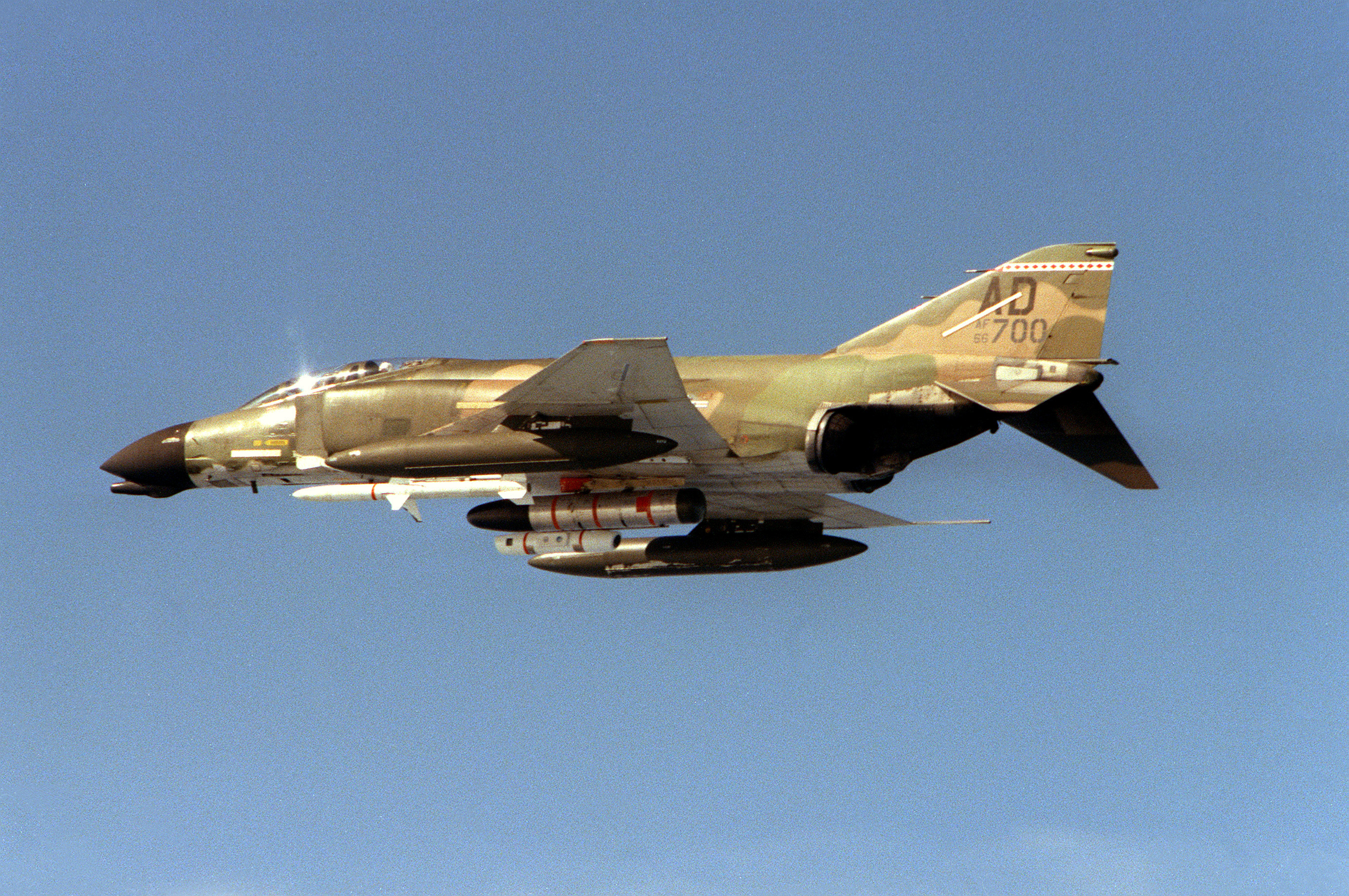
F-4D near Eglin AFB

As the United States Air Force expanded its McDonnell F-4 Phantom II fleet in April 1965, it activated the 33d Tactical Fighter Wing at Eglin Air Force Base Florida. Although it was planned that the squadrons of the 33d Wing would be Convair F-102 Delta Dagger squadrons that were inactivating in the Pacific, these squadrons were still winding down their operations, so the 33d was initially formed with the 786th, 787th, 788th and 789th Tactical Fighter Squadrons. The 33d embarked on a program of tactical training with the Phantom. In June 1965, the squadron was inactivated and its planes and personnel were transferred to the 4th Tactical Fighter Squadron, which moved on paper to Eglin from Misawa Air Base, Japan.

=== Expeditionary unit ===
In April 2006, the squadron was converted to provisional status and redesignated the 786th Air Expeditionary Squadron. It was activated in May at Tuzla, Bosnia-Herzegovina, with a detachment at Baumholder, Germany. It was activated again in September in Nigeria.

The squadron provided airlift into Darfur for the 55th Battalion of the Rwandan Army to join the United Nations African Union Mission in Darfur in 2007.

Its most recent activations have been for operations in Spain and Iceland.

== Lineage ==
- Constituted as the 786th Bombardment Squadron (Heavy) on 19 May 1943

Activated on 1 August 1943
Redesignated 786th Bombardment Squadron, Heavy c. 10 August 1944
Redesignated 786th Bombardment Squadron, Very Heavy on 5 August 1945
Inactivated on 17 October 1945

- Redesignated 787th Tactical Fighter Squadron on 9 February 1965 and activated (not organized)

Organized on 1 April 1965
Inactivated on 20 June 1965

- Converted to provisional status and redesignated 786th Air Expeditionary Squadron on 24 April 2006

Activated on 1 May 2006
Inactivated 2006
Activated on 3 September 2006
Inactivated on 20 September 2006
Activated on 2 April 2007
Inactivated on 31 October 2007
Activated on 5 May 2009
Inactivated on 5 June 2009
Activated on 1 May 2012
Inactivated unknown

=== Assignments ===
- 466th Bombardment Group, 1 August 1943 – 17 October 1945
- 33d Tactical Fighter Wing, 1 April–20 June 1965
- Attached to Air Command, Europe, 1 May 2006 – 2006
- 458th Air Expeditionary Group, 3–20 September 2006
- Attached to Third Air Force, 2 April–31 Oct 2007
- 458th Air Expeditionary Group, 5 May–5 June 2009
- Attached to Third Air Force, 1 May 2012 – unknown

=== Stations ===
- Alamogordo Army Air Field, New Mexico, 1 August 1943
- Kearns Army Air Base, Utah 31 August 1943
- Alamogordo Army Air Field, New Mexico, 27 November 1943 - 10 February 1944
- RAF Attlebridge (AAF-120), England 8 March 1944 - c. 6 July 1945
- Sioux Falls Army Air Field, South Dakota, 15 July 1945 - 25 July 1945
- Pueblo Army Air Base, Colorado, 25 July 1945 - 15 August 1945
- Davis-Monthan Field, Arizona, 15 August-17 October 1945
- Eglin Air Force Base, Florida, 1 April–20 June 1965
- Tuzla, Bosnia-Herzegovina, 1 May 2006 – 2006
- Kaduna, Nigeria, 3–20 September 2006
- Kigali International Airport, Rwanda, 29 April–31 October 2007
- Moron Air Base, Spain, 5 May–5 June 2009
- Keflavik Naval Air Station, Iceland, 1 May 2012 – unknown

=== Aircraft ===
- Consolidated B-24 Liberator, 1943–1945
- Boeing B-29 Superfortress, 1945
- McDonnell F-4 Phantom II, 1965

=== Campaigns ===
Campaign Streamer	Campaign	Dates	Notes
	Air Offensive, Europe	8 March 1944 – 5 June 1944	786th Bombardment Squadron
	Air Combat, EAME Theater	8 March 1944 – 11 May 1945	786th Bombardment Squadron
	Normandy	6 June 1944 – 24 July 1944	786th Bombardment Squadron
	Northern France	25 July 1944 – 14 September 1944	786th Bombardment Squadron
	Rhineland	15 September 1944 – 21 March 1945	786th Bombardment Squadron
	Ardennes-Alsace	16 December 1944 – 25 January 1945	786th Bombardment Squadron
	Central Europe	22 March 1944 – 21 May 1945	786th Bombardment Squadron

== See also ==
- List of F-4 Phantom II operators
- List of B-29 Superfortress operators
- B-24 Liberator units of the United States Army Air Forces
