= Individual augmentee =

US Military structural strategy

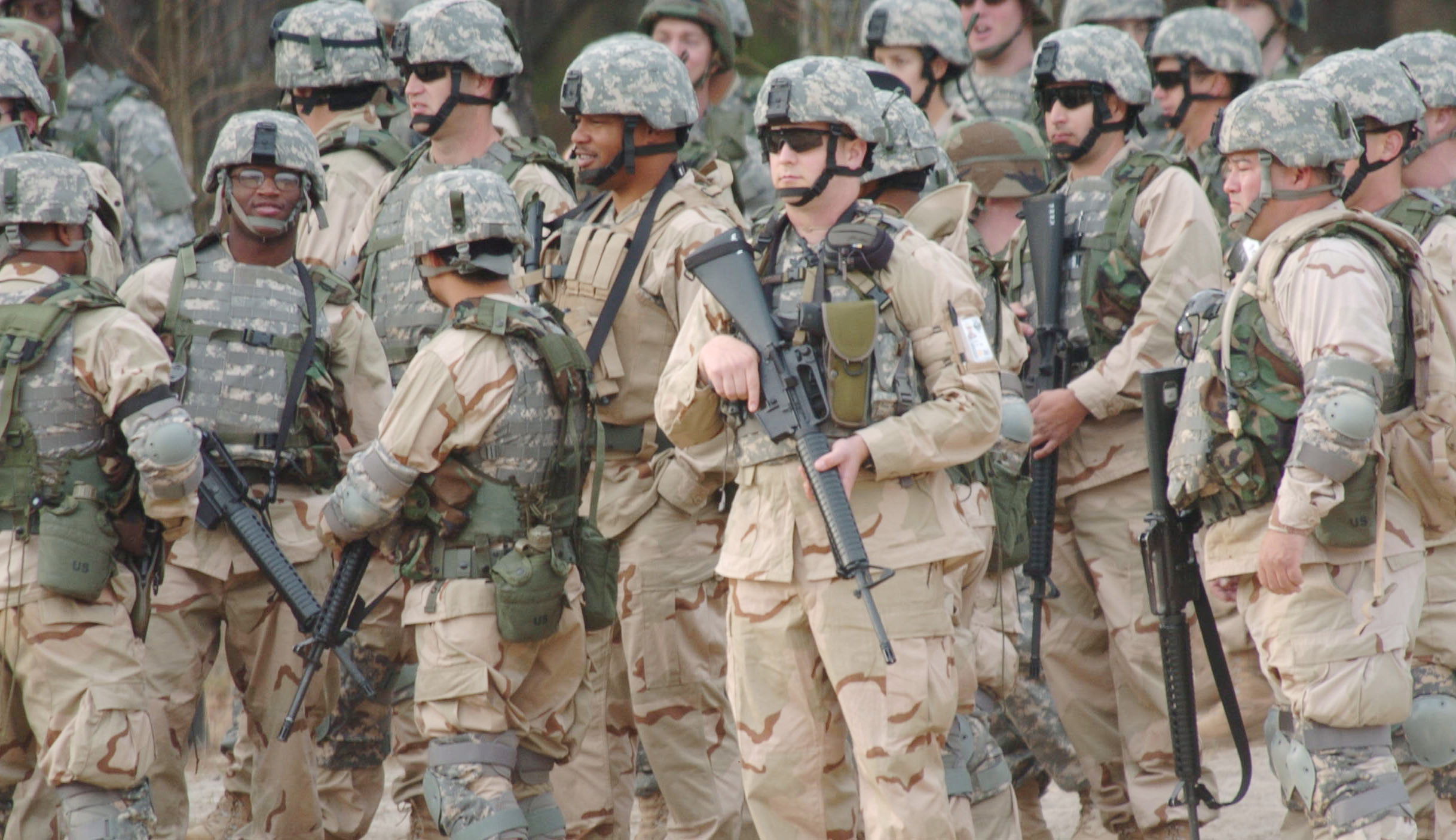
Naval sailors during the Navy's individual augmentee combat training course at Fort Jackson

An individual augmentee is a United States military member attached to a unit (battalion or company) as a temporary duty assignment (TAD/TDY). Individual augmentees can be used to fill shortages or can be used when an individual with specialized knowledge or skill sets is required. As a result, individual augmentees can include members from an entirely different branch of service. The system was used extensively in the Iraq War, though with some criticism. By early 2007, there were an average of approximately 12,000 Navy personnel filling Army jobs in the United States, Iraq, Afghanistan, Cuba and the Horn of Africa at any one time.

== Historical use ==
All branches of the military have existing regulations concerning assignment of personnel outside of their normal organization or branch of service. Examples include members of the Navy who are temporarily assigned to NASA for astronaut duty. Upon completion of their duties, these members are returned to their home units.

After the September 11, 2001 attacks, and especially after the U.S. invasion of Iraq, individual augmentee assignments increased dramatically. Initially, most of these assignments included Navy or Air Force personnel assigned to Army units to fill specialized roles that the Army had either trouble filling or had limited expertise in. Some of these personnel were already combat trained by virtue of their existing skills, while others went into combat zones in Afghanistan and Iraq with little or no combat training. As a result, a formal program soon developed that ensured a minimum level of training for all members deploying to combat zones.

== Current assignment and training model ==
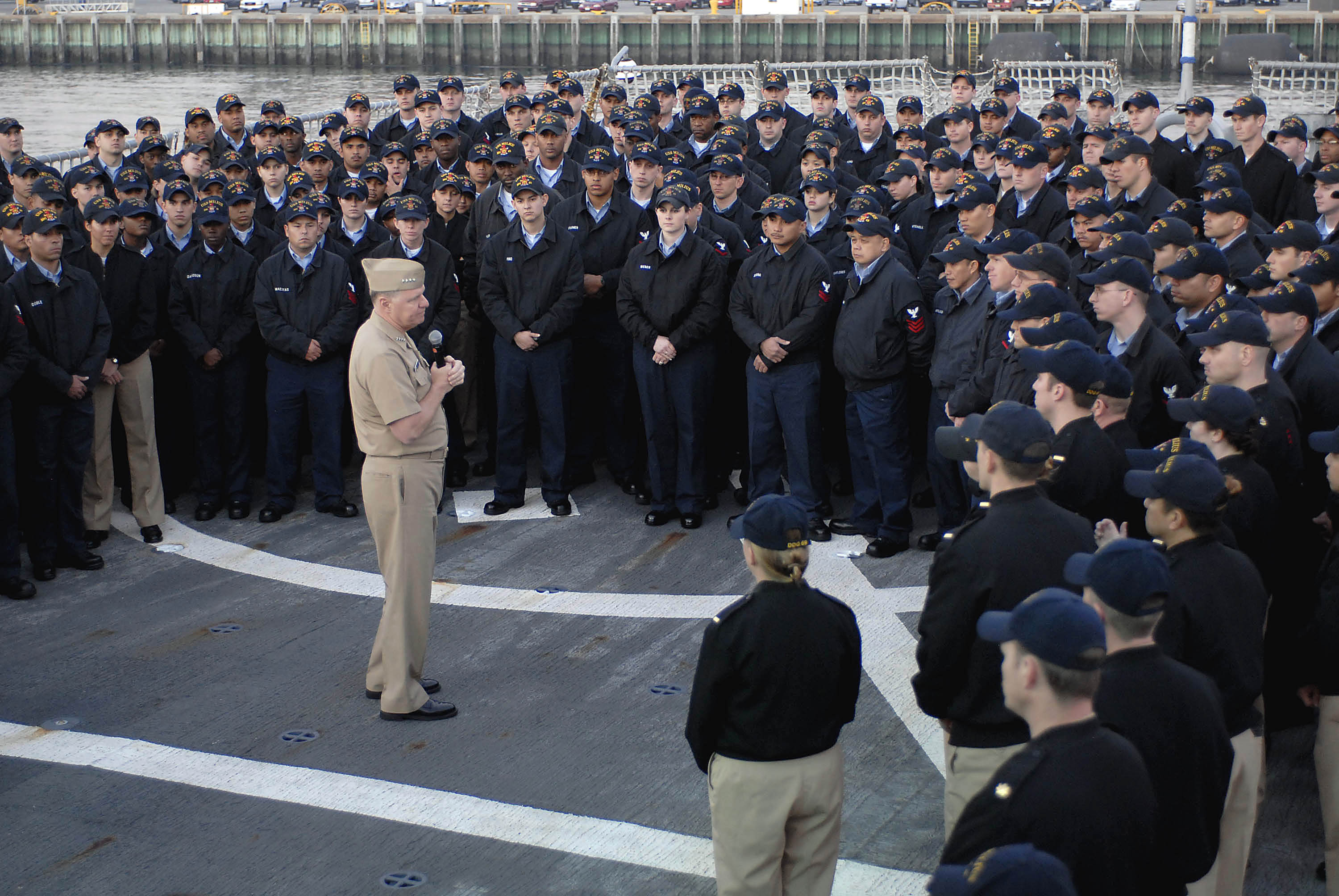
Admiral Gary Roughead, Chief of Naval Operations speaking about individual augmentee assignments and answering questions during an all-hands call aboard USS Milius

The current individual augmentee system approved by the United States Department of Defense works on a combination of ordered and volunteer assignments mirroring manning requirements. The Army produces a document consisting of job requirements with the required skill sets as well as starting and ending dates. The job descriptions are converted to Navy equivalents and the personnel activities of these branches task local commanders with assigning the required personnel. Volunteers are used first, and local commands issue orders for the remaining jobs based on local instructions. For the Navy, excess shore billets are tapped first.

As of June 5, 2008, United States Fleet Forces Command has responsibility of the individual augmentee training program. In January 2006 the McCrady Training Center at Fort Jackson, South Carolina, became the central training facility for Navy personnel assigned as individual augmentees. The center, operated by Task Force Marshall, is also a South Carolina Army National Guard facility, and the individual augmentee training program is modeled closely after the refresher training conducted for drilling reservists. Prior to using this centralized facility personnel were trained in several other locations including Fort Lewis, Washington, Camp Shelby, Mississippi, Fort Bliss, Texas, and Fort Benning, Georgia. The McCrady facility is capable of processing up to 600 students at once with an annual budget of $16.7 million.

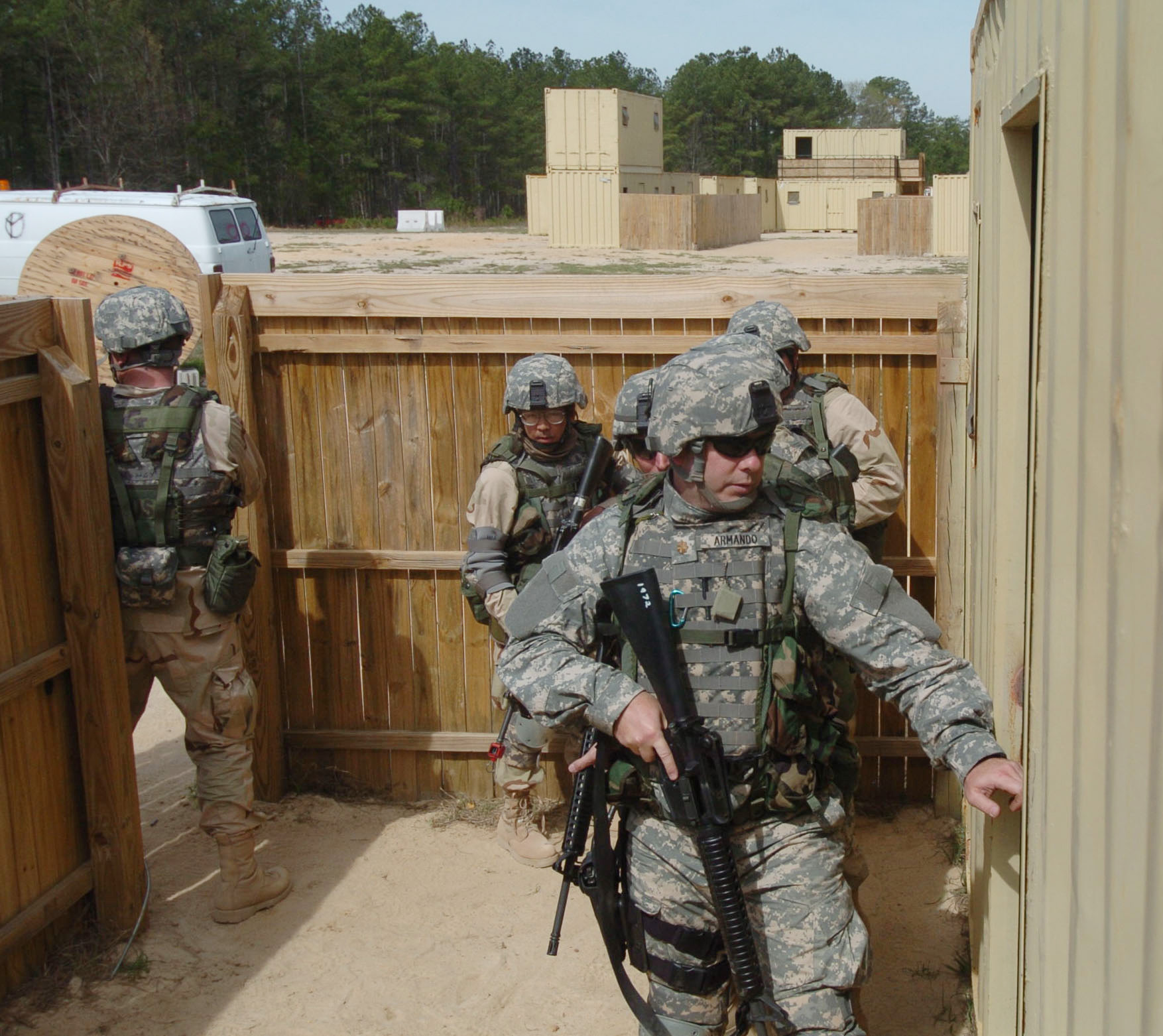
Sailors preparing to enter a simulated building while participating in the Navy's individual augmentee combat training course at Fort Jackson

Curriculum at McCrady includes basic combat skills. The three-week course is not designed to build Army infantrymen since even for Army personnel a significant amount of training occurs not in Basic Combat Training but in the experience of years on the job. Instead, the program is designed to teach individuals assigned to Army units the basic skills required to stay alive should the worst scenario occur. In keeping with this, topics covered in the training include basic marksmanship (Navy personnel must qualify on the same course of fire as Army personnel), combat first aid, land navigation, urban operations and an introduction to Army culture. Perhaps most important is training in convoy and counter-IED operations since these subjects are crucial to survival in Afghanistan and Iraq.

The vast majority of Navy individual augmentees are assigned to combat support or combat service support roles, and only a small percentage of individual augmentees have seen combat. While some risk exposure in a war zone is inevitable, most joint commands in Iraq and Afghanistan have specific controls in place to limit the exposure of personnel who are not trained for such high risk operations.

Even with the additional training and limited combat exposure of most individual augmentees, deaths have occurred. While the Navy has sustained 73 casualties in the combined efforts of Operation Iraqi Freedom and Operation Enduring Freedom, many of these individuals were Naval Combatants or Direct Support Enablers SEAL, EOD, Hospital Corpsmen, or Seabee whose roles were not typical of most Navy personnel.

== Controversy ==
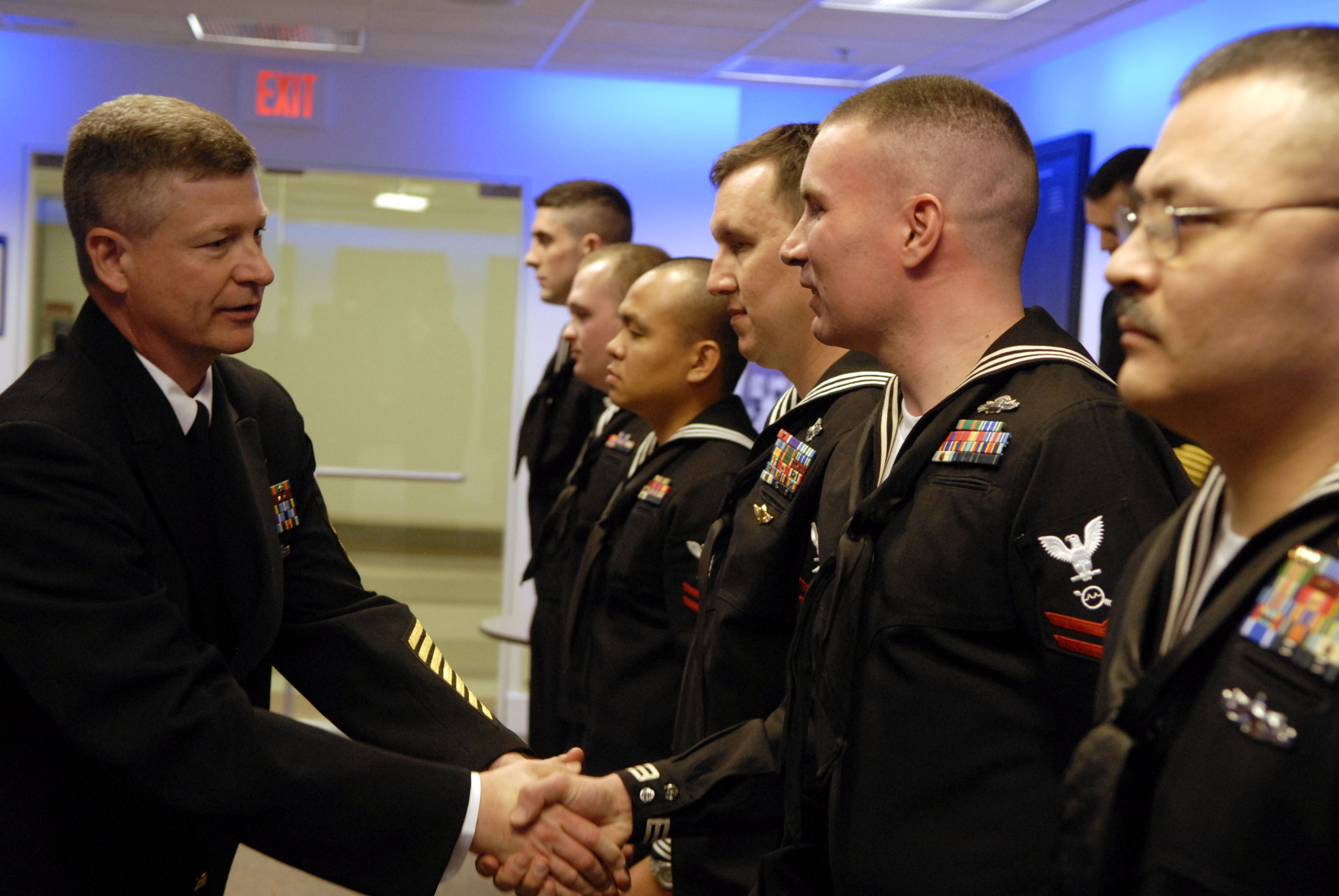
Master Chief Petty Officer of the Navy (MCPON) Rick West meeting with sailors returning from individual augmentee assignments

While the individual augmentee program has been in existence long before the September 11, 2001 attacks, the current use of the program has drawn controversy. One reason is that the program is being used to fill Army vacancies for the sole reason of making up for lower Army recruiting numbers.

There has also been criticism in Congress about the program due to issues of oversight and financing, as well as mission readiness. Congress has expressed concern that the Navy, with a traditionally sea-centric role, may be spreading itself too thin (some units have up to 40% of personnel on IA duty) and in the process may lose some of its core competency in traditional seagoing warfare. Members within the Navy have expressed concern about the increased focus of IA assignments, especially as to how they relate to promotions, advancement and awards, with some members interpreting new Navy instructions on the subject to mean that individual augmentees are to receive preferential treatment.

Although Congress and the Department of Defense have increased the Army's troop strength authorization by 7,000, the Army and Navy have both admitted that it may take as much as five years before individual augmentee requirements draw down to pre-Iraq War levels.
