= Accidents and incidents involving the Consolidated B-24 Liberator =

This is a partial list of notable accidents and incidents involving the Consolidated-designed B-24 Liberator. Combat losses are not included except for some cases denoted by singular circumstances. Consolidated C-87 Liberator Express and PB4Y Privateers are also included.

== Production ==
The B-24 was built by a consortium of companies. Consolidated airframes built in San Diego, California, were appended -CO. Consolidated production at Fort Worth, Texas, was appended -CF. Douglas Aircraft in Tulsa, Oklahoma, built airframes appended -DT. North American plant B in the city of Grand Prairie, Texas, produced aircraft appended -NT. Fully half of the 18,188 Liberators were constructed by the Ford Motor Company at the purpose-built Willow Run plant at Ypsilanti, Michigan, and were appended -FO.

== 1940s ==
2 June 1941
The first British Consolidated LB-30 Liberator II, AL503, on its acceptance flight for delivery from the cat company Consolidated Aircraft Company plant at San Diego, California, crashed into San Diego Bay when the flight controls froze. All five of the civilian crew were killed. The flight engineer, Army Reserve 2nd Lt. Bruce Kilpatrick Craig, was posthumously commissioned into the Army Air Corps, and on 25 August 1941 the airfield in his hometown was renamed Craig Field, later Craig Air Force Base. Investigation into the cause of the accident resulted in a two-month delay in deliveries, so the Royal Air Force (RAF) did not begin receiving Liberator IIs until August 1941.

22 April 1942
B-24D-CO, 41-1133, c/n 73, crashed into Trail Peak, near the Philmont Scout Ranch, 20 miles (32 km) SW of Cimarron, New Mexico. The aircraft had been returning to Kirtland Field, Albuquerque. All nine people on board were killed.

4 June 1942
Consolidated LB-30 Liberator II, AL601, was destroyed, resulting in the deaths of 14 army flyers when the aircraft struck a hilltop as it circled for an emergency landing. Shortly after takeoff, the plane developed an unspecified mechanical issue, which the pilot reported to nearby Hamilton field, California, asking the tower to clear a runway. As the plane approached the field, it suddenly lost altitude and crashed into a hillside on the Herzog ranch, 3 miles (4.8 km) NW of Hamilton field.

7 June 1942
Maj. Gen. Clarence Tinker became the first U.S. general to die during World War II when his plane crashed during the Battle of Midway. His Consolidated LB-30 Liberator II, AL589, of the 31st Bombardment Squadron, 5th Bombardment Group, 7th Air Force, was seen going down, taking him and eight other crew to their deaths. Tinker Air Force Base in Oklahoma City, Oklahoma, was named in his honor on 14 October 1942.

1 July 1942
Consolidated LB-30 Liberator II, AL527, of the 38th Bomb Squadron, 30th Bomb Group, flown by 1st Lt. Robert K. Murphy departed March Field, California, and struck the top of a low knoll two miles (3.2 km) west of the field. It was destroyed in two explosions that initial reports described as bombs going off, though no bombs were loaded for the training flight. Nine crew died.

11 October 1942
B-24D-1-CO, 41-23647, c/n 442, the eighth block 1 airframe, of the 469th Bomb Squadron, 333d Bomb Group, based at Topeka Army Airfield, Kansas, piloted by Ralph M. Dienst, suffered engine failure and crashed into a hillside three miles (4.8 km) west of the base. Eight people were killed and one critically injured. Army officers stated that the plane was on a routine flight.

6 January 1943
At 1735 Central War Time three miles (4.8 km) west of White City, Kansas, a B-24D-13-CO, 41-23961, c/n 756, of the 469th Bomb Squadron, 333d Bomb Group, out of Topeka Army Air Base, piloted by Robert Clyne, suffered a catastrophic structural failure due to ice. All were killed instantly except for Lt Maleckas, who escaped by parachute.

6 January 1943
B-24D-20-CO, 41-24202, c/n 997, of the 504th Bomb Squadron, 346th Bomb Group, out of Salina Army Airfield, Kansas, suffered a fire in flight and crashed 15 miles (24 km) SW of Madill, Oklahoma. The aircraft, piloted by R. G. Bishop, was destroyed by fire.

18 January 1943
Civilian Air Patrol members searching for a downed B-17 bomber in the Galiuro Mountains of southern Arizona instead discovered a B-24 that had been missing since 18 January 1943. The dead will be escorted to the homes of their next of kin.

12 February 1943
B-24D-35-CO, 42-40144, c/n 1221, of the 528th Bomb Squadron, 380th Bomb Group, Biggs Field, Texas, piloted by Charles C. Wylie, suffered engine failure, resulting in a stall-spin. The aircraft came down 8 miles (13 km) NW of Roswell, New Mexico, according to a crash report, and 5 miles (8.0 km) north of Roswell according to the Associated Press. Eight crew members were killed aboard; one crewman parachuted to safety.

17 February 1943
B-24D-53-CO, 42-40355, c/n 1432, crashed at Tucson Municipal Airport No. 2, Tucson, Arizona. Of the 34 on board, 6 Consolidated Aircraft employees riding as passengers were killed and several others were injured. The damaged airframe was subsequently modified into the first C-87 Liberator Express.

4 April 1943
B-24D-25-CO, 41-24301, "Lady Be Good", of the 514th Bomb Squadron, 376th Bombardment Group (Heavy), 9th Air Force based out of Soluch Field in Soluch in Libya, failed to return from a bombing raid on Naples on April 4, 1943. Believed to have been lost in the Mediterranean Sea while returning to its base, the wreck was accidentally discovered 710 km (440 mi) inland in the Libyan Desert by an oil exploration team from British Petroleum on November 9, 1958.

3 May 1943
B-24D-1-CO, 41-23728, "Hot Stuff", of the 330th Bomb Squadron, 93d Bomb Group, 8th Air Force, out of RAF Bovingdon, England, crashed on Mt. Fagradalsfjall on the Reykjanes peninsula after an aborted attempt to land at RAF Kaldadarnes, Iceland. Thirteen were killed in the crash including Lt. Gen. Frank Andrews and six of his staff; only tail gunner SSgt George A. Eisel survived. Andrews was the highest-ranking Allied officer to die in the line of duty at that point in the war, and was on an inspection tour as Commander of US Forces, European Theatre of Operations. Andrews Field (later Andrews Air Force Base) was named for him on 7 February 1945. It appears that "Hot Stuff" was the first heavy bomber to successfully complete 25 missions when it bombed Naples on 7 February 1943, despite the publicity given the "Memphis Belle" and "Hell's Angels" of the 303d Bomb Group. The bomber had been on the first leg of a trip to the United States for a war bond tour when it was lost.

20 May 1943
B-24E-5-FO, 42-7053, c/n 77, of the 1014th Pilot Transition Training Squadron, Tarrant Army Airfield, Texas, departed the field at 0650 CWT, piloted by David S. Alter. At approximately 1145, the aircraft struck the side of a 20-million-cubic-foot (570,000 m^{3}) gas storage tank of the Peoples Gas Light and Coke Company at 3625 73rd Street and Central Park Avenue, approximately two miles (3.2 km) SE of Municipal Airport, Chicago, Illinois. All 12 crew were killed. Approaching the airport from the southwest in light rain, light fog and light smoke, with a 500-foot ceiling and .75 miles visibility, the bomber circled the field to the north and east, and was on a southern heading when it struck the approximately 500-foot-tall (150 m) tank at the 125-foot level, initially with the left wingtip. Much of the forward fuselage fell inside the tank structure which exploded, throwing steel plate over 300 feet (91 m) with heat felt over a mile away. Nine employees were on the grounds but none were injured. Four United Airlines flights had rejected landings at the airport between 0957 and 1027 due to conditions, and continued to Milwaukee. The storage tank had been largest of its type in the world, erected in 1928 at a cost of $2 million, according to a Chicago Daily Tribune account; it was not rebuilt.

4 July 1943
RAF Consolidated LB-30 Liberator II, AL523, crashed on takeoff from RAF North Front, Gibraltar, killing the exiled Polish Prime Minister Władysław Sikorski, together with his daughter, his Chief of Staff Tadeusz Klimecki, and seven others. Only pilot Eduard Prchal (1911–1984) survived. The flight departed at 2307 hrs. and crashed into the sea after only 16 seconds of flight. Sikorski had tirelessly worked to promote the Polish cause and there were rumours that his death was not accidental. He had broken off relations with the Soviet Union on 26 April due to the Katyn massacre and his death was convenient for Stalin and the western Allies who were trying to preserve good relations with Russia.

30 July 1943
A B-24 Bomber was observed flying low in mountainous terrain, and a witness stated that the motors stopped. Multiple witnesses saw a fire after the crash. Ranchers were the first to reach the site. All nine airmen on board the routine training flight were killed. The dead were identified as 2nd Lt George Edge, 2nd Lt Donavan Lukeheart, 2nd Lt William Scott, 2nd Lt Robert Kirk, Sgt Kenneth Snyder, Sgt Ernest Peck, Sgt Irvin Layton, staff Sgt Regis Kinzler, and Staff Sgt Carl Kuell.

8 August 1943
Consolidated RB-24E Liberator, 42-7159, c/n 183, built as a B-24E-15-FO and redesignated in the Restricted category, of the 605th Bomb Squadron, 399th Bomb Group, Wendover Field, piloted by Herbert Williams, Jr., experienced engine failure and crashed on U.S. 40-50 several miles east of Wendover, Utah. The aircraft slid across the highway and hit railroad tracks, coming to rest 100 feet (30 m) on the opposite side. 10 to 15 minutes later, a westbound freight train encountered the scattered wreckage and a spread rail. Three freight cars derailed with twenty-six more piling together. Two hundred feet (61 m) of the railroad was torn up, and a rail official estimated damage to train and freight at $200,000. The trainmen helped the injured fliers escape from the wreckage. Ten were injured, some critically, and co-pilot 2nd Lt. Richard L. Blue died at Wendover Field's hospital. The bomber did not burn. The locomotives powering the freight were an EMD FTA-FTB semi-permanently coupled pair.

15 August 1943
Attempting to land at Davis-Monthan Field in Tucson, Arizona, a B-24 Bomber was forced to perform a crash landing after the right landing gear failed to deploy. No injuries were reported by the six crew members, and damage to the aircraft was "slight."

30 August 1943
B42 Liberator, 42-7468, crashed shortly after take-off from RAF Burtonwood in north-west England. All nine onboard died.

2 September 1943
Consolidated B-24E-25-FO Liberator, 42-7237, c/n 261, of the 703d Bomb Squadron, 445th Bomb Group, crashed on a routine training flight, killing all 10 crew members. The crash occurred 5 miles (8 km) from Sioux City air base according to the Associated Press, and 1 mile east of the base according to the crash report.

4 September 1943
B-24E-25-CF, 41-29071, of the 701st Bomb Squadron, 445th Bomb Group, Sioux City Army Air Base, Iowa, crashed in a corn field 4 miles (6.4 km) SW of Moville, Iowa. All eight crew members were killed.

4 September 1943
Consolidated Liberator III 1524, c/n 589 from No. 10 Squadron RCAF, on a flight from Gander, Newfoundland crashed into Gander Lake immediately after takeoff killing the entire crew.

20 October 1943
A Consolidated Liberator III from No. 10 Squadron RCAF, on a routine flight from Gander, Newfoundland, to Mont-Joli, Québec, flew into a mountain near Saint-Donat, Lanaudière, Quebec, due to inclement weather and a mapping error. Everyone aboard was killed and the wreckage was not located for more than two years.

25 October 1943
Two Consolidated B-24H Liberators of the 724th Bomb Squadron (Heavy), 451st Bomb Group (Heavy), from Fairmont Army Air Field, Nebraska, collided while flying in a formation of four B-24Hs during a training flight at 20,000 feet (6,100 m) The bombers crashed in agricultural fields, one 2 miles (3.2 km) north of Milligan, Nebraska, and the other 3.6 miles (5.8 km) NE of Milligan. All eight crew died aboard B-24H-1-FO, 42-7657, while the sole survivor of ten crew on B-24H-1-FO, 42-7673, was copilot 2nd Lt. Melvin Klein, who was thrown free of the wreckage and deployed his parachute. A Nebraska historical marker was erected in 2010 near Milligan.

December 21, 1943
42-40910, A Cold Weather Testing Detachment from Ladd field on a routine test flight crashed into a mountaintop overlooking the Charley River. On board were pilots Harold "Hos" Hoskin and Leon Crane, flight engineer Richard Pompeo, radio operator Ralph Wenz, and James E. Seibert. Crane was the only survivor, having managed to bail out in time, and then survive alone for 84 days in the Alaskan wilderness.

8 January 1944
B-24J-40-CO, 42-73365, (the first block 40-CO airframe) of the 776th Bomb Squadron, 464th Bomb Group, Pocatello Army Air Field, Idaho, crashed 40 miles (64 km) NW of the air base during a night training mission. The crash occurred on the grounds of the Idaho National Laboratory. Five crew members were found killed at the crash site and the bodies of the remaining two crew were located and identified by 11 January.

12 January 1944
B-24D-165-CO, 42-72887, c/n 2447, of Biggs Field, Texas, made a crash landing 30 miles (48 km) north of Biggs following mechanical failure. (An Associated Press wire report gave the location as "about 35 miles north of El Paso.") Seven crew were killed and one critically injured.

22 January 1944
Two RB-24Es of B-24 replacement training units 355th Bomb Squadron, 302d Bomb Group, Langley Field, Virginia, collided on a local flight. B-24E-25-CF (as built), 41-29075, c/n 67, flown by Howard R. Cosgrove, crashed and burned, killing all seven on board. B-24E-25-FO (as built), 42-7420, c/n 444, piloted by Carlos N. Clayton, crash landed in a swamp; despite the aircraft being virtually demolished, none of its eight crew members suffered serious injury.

25 January 1944
B-24E-25-DT, 41-28544, of the 34th Combat Crew Training Squadron, Blythe Army Airfield, California, piloted by Donald J. Harris, crashed 4 miles (6.4 km) north of Quartzsite, Arizona, killing all seven aboard.

20 March 1944
A B42 Liberator attempted a crash landing about 22 miles southeast of Willcox, Arizona. The plane was stationed at Davis-Monthan Field, Tucson, Arizona, and newspaper accounts say that five were killed, but the article itself names only four: 2nd Lt Gerald F Hayden, 2nd Lt Martin Wegehaupt, George Stoffel, and Sgt Roger McCord. Five other crew members were not injured.

26 March 1944
RB-24E, 41-28525 of the 302nd Bombardment Group, of Chatham Field, Georgia, crashed during a flight en-route to Grand Bahama Island, Florida, near dusk. Having a failure of engine No. 2, the pilot, 2nd Lt. Richard E. Kelly, radioed the Melbourne Naval Air Station for emergency approach. However, he came in high and to the right of the runway on his first attempt. While making a left hand climb out to attempt a second landing, the aircraft suffered a second engine failure and plummeted into a railroad embankment, exploding on impact at approximately 21:35 hrs, narrowly avoiding a base housing block. While killing ten of the eleven men aboard, miraculously, the co-pilot, Lt. Basil R. Huntress, was thrown out of the cockpit and survived, but with serious injuries. He was medically discharged shortly after. The No.1 engine was thrown forward of the wreck and investigators found it had damaged bearings along with engine No.2. Basil Huntress, was interviewed in 1995 by Florida Today, when he returned to the crash site. He died on 19 May 2010. (Link to actual interview cannot be found)

9 April 1944
B-24D-135-CO, 42-41128, c/n 2203, of the 420th AAF Base Unit, March Field, California, crashed in a weather-related accident 3 miles (4.8 km) SW of Marine Corps Auxiliary Air Station Mojave, California, while on a routine training flight to simulate a long-range bombing mission. All ten crew members were killed. The crash site was rediscovered in 2005.

11 April 1944
B-24H-25-FO, 42-95064, crashed while flying from Waller Field, Trinidad, to Belem, Brazil. Its last reported contact was at 0905 hrs., when a ground station in Brazil relayed a requested weather report to the aircraft. Decades later, the crash site was discovered in dense jungle 170 miles (270 km) NW of Macapa and 345 miles (555 km) NW of Belem. A three-week recovery effort by Army Central Identification Laboratory in Hawaii (CILHI), with assistance from a FAB (Brazilian Air Force) team and a EB (Brazilian Army) team, found two sets of dog tags and numerous bone fragments. The remains of the crew were interred under a group headstone at Arlington National Cemetery on 20 February 1998.

24 April 1944
B-24 42-5111 of the USAAF crashed into a mountain in Epsom, New Hampshire, shortly after departing Grenier Field in Manchester, New Hampshire, killing all 10 occupants.

25 April 1944
A Royal Air Force Liberator B Mark VI EW-148 en route to Britain via Gander, Newfoundland, crashed into the Griffintown neighborhood in downtown Montreal, Quebec, minutes after taking off from Dorval Airport. The five-member RAF Ferry Command crew and ten civilians on the ground were killed, and a large fire destroyed at least 10 homes. Witnesses described seeing part of the tail detached at low altitude as the aircraft apparently tried to reach the river. The crew included three members of the Polish Air Force.

25 April 1944
Two B-24 Consolidated Liberator bombers collided in the air 12 miles northeast of Yuma, Arizona, resulting in the deaths of all 12 airmen. One plane from March Field in California was returning from a training mission, carrying three officers and four enlisted men. The second plane was enroute from the Consolidated Aircraft Corporation in San Diego, and three civilians and two soldiers were aboard.

29 April 1944
Consolidated RB-24E Liberator, 41-28413, flying back to base at Kirtland Field, Albuquerque, New Mexico after a brief stop-over at Glenview Air Field, Chicago, Illinois. While overflying Nebraska, and due to bad weather, the aircraft went out of control and crashed in a canyon located some 15 miles southwest of Merna. All 10 occupants were killed. Capt. Virgil D Anderson – Capt. Stanley M Foster – 2nd Lt. Frank L Brown – 2nd Lt. Warren C Karas – 2nd Lt. Charles F Piel – Flt. Off. Rollin E Ryburn – S/Sgt. Eugene D Rydstedt – Flt. Eng. Cpl. Adam Joseph Kochan – Pvt. Edward J Jacobs – Pvt. Bruno C Oskar.

5 May 1944
B-24J Liberator, SN: 44-40332, crashed early in the morning after departing from Hickam Field on a replacement mission en-route to the 5th AF. Shortly after take off, they failed to make a turn and crashed into Pu'u Uau Ridge in the Ko'olau mountains on Oahu, Hawaii. Some of the wreckage is still visible along the Aiea Loop Trail within the Keaiwa Heiau State Recreation Area. All ten aviators perished serving their country. Their names were 2 Lt W R Kimble, 2 Lt C E Mueller, S Sgt J J Dowd, 2 Lt W E Somsel Jr, Sgt J H Means, Cpl G L Weiss, Cpl M F Campos, 2 Lt M Righthand, S Sgt M F Norman, Cpl J J Carlucci.

8 June 1944
C-87-CF Liberator Express, 41-24006, c/n 801, crashed during attempted belly-landing at Station 4, Jorhat, India. The pilot was Lawrence C. Ackerson.

15 June 1944
A B-24 bomber caught fire after a crash landing at Lowry Field, near Sterling, Colorado. Five airmen were killed, and three were injured. The dead included PFC Nelson Gray, of Phoenix

1 July 1944
A B-24J, 44-40564, crashed while attempting night landing at Abadan, Iran. Pilot Dealma Lurry.

15 July 1944
B-24J-5-FO Liberator, 42-50871, of the 272d Base Unit, Topeka AAF, Kansas, crashed one mile NW of Ashville, New York, killing all five crew. The Aviation Archaeological Investigation and Research website indicates that the bomber was involved in a mid-air collision, but provides no further details, and no other aircraft appear in accident report listings at this location and date.

25 July 1944
RB-24E Liberator, 41-28559, stationed at Liberal Army Airfield, crashed and burned nine miles NNW of Liberal, Kansas, killing two: 1st Lt Maurice Forrey and 2nd Lt Charles Post. Two officers and one enlisted man were able to use their parachutes and survived.

26 July 1944
A B-24J Liberator on a training run out of Lincoln Army Air Field in Lincoln, Nebraska encountered compass trouble and found themselves over Kansas City, Kansas, near the childhood home of 2nd Lt Kenneth Keech, one of the officers aboard. Witnesses reported the plane flying as low as 100 feet above the ground, damaging four suburban homes and eventually crashing into a fifth in Merriam, Kansas. Three of the six crewmen aboard the plane died in the crash; the remaining three survived with injuries. Three civilians on the ground were also injured.

23 August 1944
A United States Army Air Forces (AAF) B-24H-20-CF, 42-50291, "Classy Chassis II", crashed into a school at Freckleton, Lancashire, England, at 1047 hrs. after aborting a landing at Warton Aerodrome. 20 adults, 38 children and the 3-man crew were killed. In addition to a memorial in the village churchyard, a marker was placed at the site of the accident in 2007.

14 September 1944
A B-24 went down 6 miles southeast of Davis-Monthan Air Field, Tucson, Arizona, killing three crew members: 2nd Lt Chester Welenc, Stephen Pedone, and Staff Sergeant Nick Outten. One crew member survived.

14 September 1944
A U.S. AAF B24H "42-95499" 2135AAF Suffered an unknown engine malfunction while on a training flight over what would become Port St. Joe, Florida, from Training Field Tyndall. There were 14 military personnel on board when the malfunction occurred. The pilot was able to guide the aircraft back over land, instructing the other personnel on board to abandon aircraft. 10 members jumped out, with one parachute malfunctioning. The remaining 4, and the service member whose parachute failed to open, were found deceased.

15 September 1944
A U.S. AAF TB-24J Liberator, 42-50890 (built as a B-24J-5-FO and converted), of the 3007th AAF Base Unit, Kirtland Field, crashed, killing all eight crew members. The aircraft was en route from Bakersfield, California, to Kirtland Field, New Mexico, when it flew off-course and crashed into a boulder field near the top of Humphreys Peak, 10 miles (16 km) north of Flagstaff, Arizona, at about 0330 hrs. The location is nearly inaccessible and has been left undisturbed.

13 October 1944
A B-24H, 41-28866, (Nancy Jane (II)), received damage from flak batteries during a mission over Vienna and Graz. On its flight back to the Adriatic island of Vis, the aircraft lost power in one engine and was experiencing issues with another, prompting the crew to conclude that the extent of damage will make it impossible to reach the destination, so the decision was made to ditch the plane on enemy territory. After running out of fuel, at about 1430 hrs the aircraft crashed in a field next to a major road nine miles northeast of Šibenik. The crew of 11 had parachuted and survived the crash, with nine ending up in German captivity. The crash site was scavenged the following day, and was archeologically assessed in 2020. All 11 crew survived the war.

18 October 1944
A B-24 bomber crashed and burned on takeoff from Davis-Monthan Airfield, in Tucson, Arizona. Six crew members were killed during the crash, and the other five were taken to the hospital. Two of the wounded died the next day. The dead were 2nd Lt Albert Jolly, PFC Alexander Stewart, 2nd Lt Ernest Conley, 2nd Lt Stanley Danziger, 2nd Lt John Hackman, Cpl Alfred Leannals, PFC Carl Skyten, and PFC Howard Waeltz. One of the plane's propellers traveled 350 feet and struck a building, injuring an instructor with flying glass.

24 October 1944
U.S. Navy Consolidated PB4Y-2 Privateer, BuNo 59394, of VPB-106, out of NAAS Camp Kearney, California, became lost in bad weather on a long-range training mission, ran out of fuel and ditched in the Gulf of California. Eleven crew, two female Marines, and the squadron canine mascot all evacuated the bomber as it rapidly sank. The party made their way to a deserted island near the eastern coast of Baja California, subsisting on raw fish and clams until they were rescued by Mexican fishermen four days later.
15 November 1944
4 airplanes, one from each squadron of the 461st Bombardment Group (H), went out on a bombing mission to Innsbruck, but the B-24 from the 765th Squadron did not return (42-51971). While it is unknown exactly how the plane went down, as there was no communication with the aircraft after takeoff, the best guess as to why is ice on the wings. All ten crew members on the plane were killed, but not everyone was on the original crew. Two of the Crew members of Beatty's plane did not go on this flight, and were replaced by Lt. Paul Dietrick(N) and Lt. Emil Berg(Nose Nav). While the Missing Air Crew Report (9885) states the plane likely crashed in the Austrian Alps, according to Radovan Zivanovic, there is debris near Brgudac, Croatia.:
22 November 1944
PB4Y-2 Privateer, BuNo 59544, on a pre-delivery test flight by company crew out of Lindbergh Field, San Diego, California, lost its port outer wing on climb-out and crashed in a ravine less than two miles (3.2 km) from point of lift-off. All crew were killed. The wing panel came down on a home at 3121 Kingsley Street in Loma Portal. The cause was found to be 98 missing bolts, with only 4 spar bolts holding the wing. Four employees were fired and Consolidated Vultee was found guilty of gross negligence.

24 November 1944
A U.S. AAF B-24H, 42-95133 'Lady Jane', was returning from a practice mission, and making a second attempt at an instrument approach landing to RAF Horsham St Faith (AAF Station 123) when it clipped the 'steeple' (actually a tower) of St Philip's Church, Heigham Road, Norwich, and crashed in Norwich City railway station goods yard. The accident killed all 9 airmen on board.

30 November 1944
Two B-24J-35-CO Liberators, 42-73344 and 42-73357, of the 233d Combat Crew Training Squadron, flying out of Davis–Monthan Army Air Base, collided on a training mission NE of Tucson, Arizona. All eighteen airmen died. The crash occurred in the desert over a major natural drainage canal known as the Pantano Wash, at a point half-way between present day East Broadway and East Speedway.

15 December 1944
a Liberator flying out of Truax Field near Madison, Wisconsin crashed into Lake Pepin on the Minnesota/Wisconsin border. All three aboard were killed. The aircraft was recovered in April, 1945.

30 January 1945
B-24L-1-FO, 44-49180, crashed west of Helendale, California. Three crew died in the crash while three others successfully bailed out. The wreckage was recovered to Victorville Army Airfield, California.

5 February 1945
B-24H Liberator, 42-52503, was lost during a bombing mission to Regensburg, Germany. On the return trip back to their base in Italy, they were lost over the Adriatic Sea. The official report states that the aircraft was short on fuel and experienced engine trouble. There were no survivors and the entire crew of ten men were declared missing.

5 February 1945
A B-24 Liberator crashed about 4.5 miles northwest of the Charleston Army Air Base, Charleston, South Carolina. Seven crew members were killed, and five were injured.

26 February 1945
C-87A-CO Liberator Express, 41-24174, was lost between Kwajalein and Johnston Island while en route to Hawaii. Brigadier General James Andersen was aboard, and Andersen Air Force Base, Guam, was subsequently named in his honor.

6 March 1945
One month after the February crash there, a B-24 Liberator crashed on takeoff from Charleston Army Air Base, near Charleston, South Carolina, on the night of March 6, 1945. Four crew members died, and two were injured. Killed in the crash and subsequent fire were Second Lieutenant Richard Englen, pilot, Corporal Linwood Lang, engineer, and Corporal John Rurack, radio operator. Dying the next day from injuries received was Second Lieutenant Paul McGranaghan, bombardier.

16 March 1945
A stick of 1,000-lb bombs dropped by Liberator B Mark VI 'R-Roger' of No. 70 Squadron, hit another Liberator B Mark VI, KK320 'V-Victor' of No. 37 Squadron flying underneath, during a daylight raid on the shipbuilding yards at Monfalcone, Italy, KK320 lost the propeller from its port inner engine and suffered a large hole in the forward fuselage as a result of the strike.

27 March 1945
RAF Consolidated LB-30 Liberator II, AL504, the first Mk II accepted by the British, converted to a very long-range VIP transport for the prime minister and named "Commando", was lost over the Atlantic Ocean. It was travelling between the Azores and Ottawa, Ontario, Canada. The prime minister was not on board. Lost with the crew was Air Marshal Sir Peter Roy Maxwell Drummond, the RAF's Air Member for Training.

31 March 1945
The worst aviation accident in Orkney history, that of a B-24 Liberator bomber returning from a perilous mission over Norway, to drop a Special Operations Group over hostile territory, along with a store of arms and equipment during Operasion RYPE under command by William Colby the later director of CIA. However, fate intervened and the crew had no choice but to abort the mission and return to their secondary base in Scotland, but sadly were destined to crash in a field on Orkney with the loss of thirteen men and only one survivor. The story is told in the book "Almost Home: The Story of the B-24 Crash at Walliwall Orkney – 31 March 1945" by David W. Earl.

5 April 1945
A B-24H-15-DT, 41-28779 of the 564th Bomb Squadron, 389th Bomb Group (Heavy), was captured by the Luftwaffe on 20 June 1944 (MACR 6533), and operated as KO+XA by KG 200. It departed Wackersleben, Germany, to avoid the Soviet advance with twenty-nine KG 200 personnel aboard for a flight to Bavaria via Braunschweig. About 25 minutes into the flight, a German flak battery fired on KO+XA, damaging the fuselage, wings, right outer engine and rudder cables, and injuring two passengers (one of whom died). Pilot Oberfeldwebel Rauchfuss landed in a meadow near Quedlinburg, but a power line forced him to apply power to clear it and the bomber broke its nose wheel strut when it overran into a freshly ploughed field. Damaged components were sent for repair and an attempt was made to take off on 13 April, but the clearing proved too short, the aircraft bogged down in the sodden soil, and the nose strut broke again. The crew then destroyed the airframe by burning it.

7 April 1945
On the night between 6 and 7 April 1945, a last attempt was made to send reinforcements to Gjefsjøen mountain farm in German occupied Norway during "Operasjon Rype". Operasion RYPE was under command by William Colby the later director of CIA. The plane was to carry extra personnel and equipment for the Norwegian and American soldiers. It was bad weather the night of April 7 and the plane crashed into the mountain Plukkutjønnfjellet. All 12 died. The plane was part of 492nd Bomb Group, codename "Carpetbagger", with base in Harrington, England.

21 April 1945
B-24J-1-FO, 42-95592, "Black Cat", of the 784th Bomb Squadron, 466th Bomb Group, based at RAF Attlebridge (USAAF Station 120), was shot down during military operations over Germany. It had aborted a mission to bomb a rail bridge at Salzburg, Austria, due to bad weather, and was returning to base when it received a flak burst in the port wing near Regensburg. It was the last heavy bomber of the 8th Air Force lost over Germany during World War II, and the only loss of this mission. Only the bombardier and the tail gunner escaped from the aircraft to become prisoners of war, the other ten crew being killed. (MACR 14182)

30 April 1945
The first production PB4Y-2 Privateer, BuNo 59359, was destroyed by fire on the ramp at Lindbergh Field, San Diego, California. It was being prepared for a flight to NAS Twin Cities, Minnesota. A mechanic attempted to remove the port battery solenoid, located 14 inches below the cockpit floor, but did so without disconnecting the battery. A hydraulic line three inches above the battery was accidentally punctured with a wrench and the fluid ignited, setting the entire aircraft alight. The mechanic suffered severe burns and only the starboard outer engine of the aircraft was deemed salvageable. The cause was ruled to be an unqualified mechanic attempting a task that only a qualified electrician should undertake.

7 May 1945
Two B-24 Liberators collided less than a mile northwest of the Liberal Army Airfield, Kansas, killing two officers and an enlisted man. The dead were Lt. Archie B. Caraway, 22, of Torrence, Calif.; Lt. Rubin Indik of Brooklyn, N.Y.; and Private Aloysius H. Frieberger Jr, 24 of Dubuque, Iowa.

10 May 1945
Two PB4Y-2 Privateers, BuNo 59437 and 59721, both of VB-4, collided in mid-air while in training over Munson, Florida. As a F6F Hellcat fighter dove at the formation of two patrol bombers, the bombers maneuvered into a turn and the trailing bomber collided with the leader, disabling one of the leader's engines. The lead bomber went into an immediate spin and crashed. The second PB4Y flew straight and level for a short time before it also spun and crashed. The wreckage came down about eight miles (13 km) north of Munson. Twenty-eight crew were killed, including one found in an unopened parachute.

14 May 1945
Consolidated B-24M-15-CO "Brief", 44-42058, of the 494th Bombardment Group from Angaur, was shot down by anti-aircraft fire while taking part in a bombing raid over Koror, Korea. The bomber's left wing was struck by flak fire, destroying it and causing it to swing into the fuselage. Nine crew died in the crash, with the sole survivor, 2nd Lt. Wallace F. Kaufman, captured and later executed by Japanese forces.

13 June 1945
A USAAF B-24H-25-FO, 42-95095, of the 66th Bomb Squadron, 44th Bomb Group, returning to the U.S. from Prestwick Airfield, crashed at Shieldaig in the remote Fairy Lochs in Wester Ross, Scotland. The crew of nine were killed along with six crewmen from Air Transport Command. A memorial has been erected at the site.

30 June 1945
A B-24 bomber on a training flight out of Williams Field, Arizona, crashed and burned, killing all 7 airmen. The dead were 1st Lt Victor Bruce, 2nd Lt Quentin Redden, 2nd Lt Hesler Ellis, Flight Officer Frederick Gregor, Flight Officer Ernest Sager, Tech Sgt Richard Hoyt, and Staff Sgt Arthur Hendrix.

29 July 1945
B-24H-20-FO, 42-94956, c/n 1721, of the 2135th Base Unit, Tyndall Field, Florida, crashed due to bad weather 12 miles (19 km) NW of Southport, Florida. All the crew were killed.
3 November 1945
Consolidated LB-30/C-87 Liberator Express, AL-640, assigned to the 1504th AAF Base Unit, Fairfield-Suisun Army Air Base, crashed into the Pacific Ocean and sank. The aircraft was four hours out of Hawaii en route to Fairfield-Suisun Army Air Base, California, when it ran out of fuel and ditched at 0740 hrs., 500 miles (800 km) NE of Honolulu at approximately 149-50W/25-25N. Eighteen were killed and eight survived on life rafts to be rescued by surface vessels. Seven ships, including aircraft carriers, were involved in the search. One of the survivors, John R. Patrick, was convicted at a court martial of involuntary manslaughter for failing to "determine positively" whether the plane had been refueled before takeoff.

9 November 1949
A U.S. Navy PB4Y-2 Privateer on a training flight crash-landed south of Mikkalo, Oregon, after all four engines "froze up" in flight. One person was killed in the crash.

== 1950s ==
21 March 1952
A PB4Y-2 Privateer, bound for NAS Alameda, California, dove into Corpus Christi Bay less than a mile from Naval Air Station Corpus Christi, Texas. All 10 Navy airmen aboard the plane were killed.

16 December 1953
A U.S. Navy PB4Y-2S Privateer, BuNo 59716, of VW-3, ComFairGuam, NAS Agana, Guam, disappeared while conducing atmospheric research. The aircraft was making a low-level penetration, 200–300 feet (61–91 m), into the eye of Super Typhoon Doris; its transmission of a radio report was interrupted at 2245 hours Zulu. A nine-day search turned up no trace of the aircraft or its nine crew.
August 26, 1956
Consolidated PB4Y-2 Privateer (BuNo 59695) ditched into Lake Washington shortly after takeoff from Naval Station Puget Sound. All crew were able to escape the aircraft which then sank to the lake floor where it remains today in 2026. There are no plans to recover the remains of the plan which is known to be almost fully intact.
15 April 1957
C-87 Liberator Express, registration XA-KUN, operated by Transportes Aéreos Mexicanos crashed shortly after takeoff from Mérida-Rejón Airport. All three aboard and one on the ground were killed. Among those killed was famous Mexican singer and actor Pedro Infante.

5 February 1958
B-24J Liberator, HE-842, of Indian Air Force No. 16 Squadron, crashed at Sulur, near Coimbatore, Madras State, while engaged in a naval–air exercise. 10 Indian air and naval personnel were killed.

== 2000s ==
18 July 2002
Consolidated PB4Y-2 Privateer, BuNo 66260, civil registration N7620C, suffered a failure killing two crew. The aircraft was flying as Tanker 123 for Hawkins & Powers Aviation of Greybull, Wyoming, under contract to the U.S. Forest Service (USFS), and suffered wing spar failure during a slurry drop at Estes Park, Colorado. Contracts for vintage tanker aircraft were cancelled soon thereafter.
