= 1944 Montreal RAF Liberator VI crash =

Aviation incident in Canada

Coordinates: 45.493678°N 73.558497°W

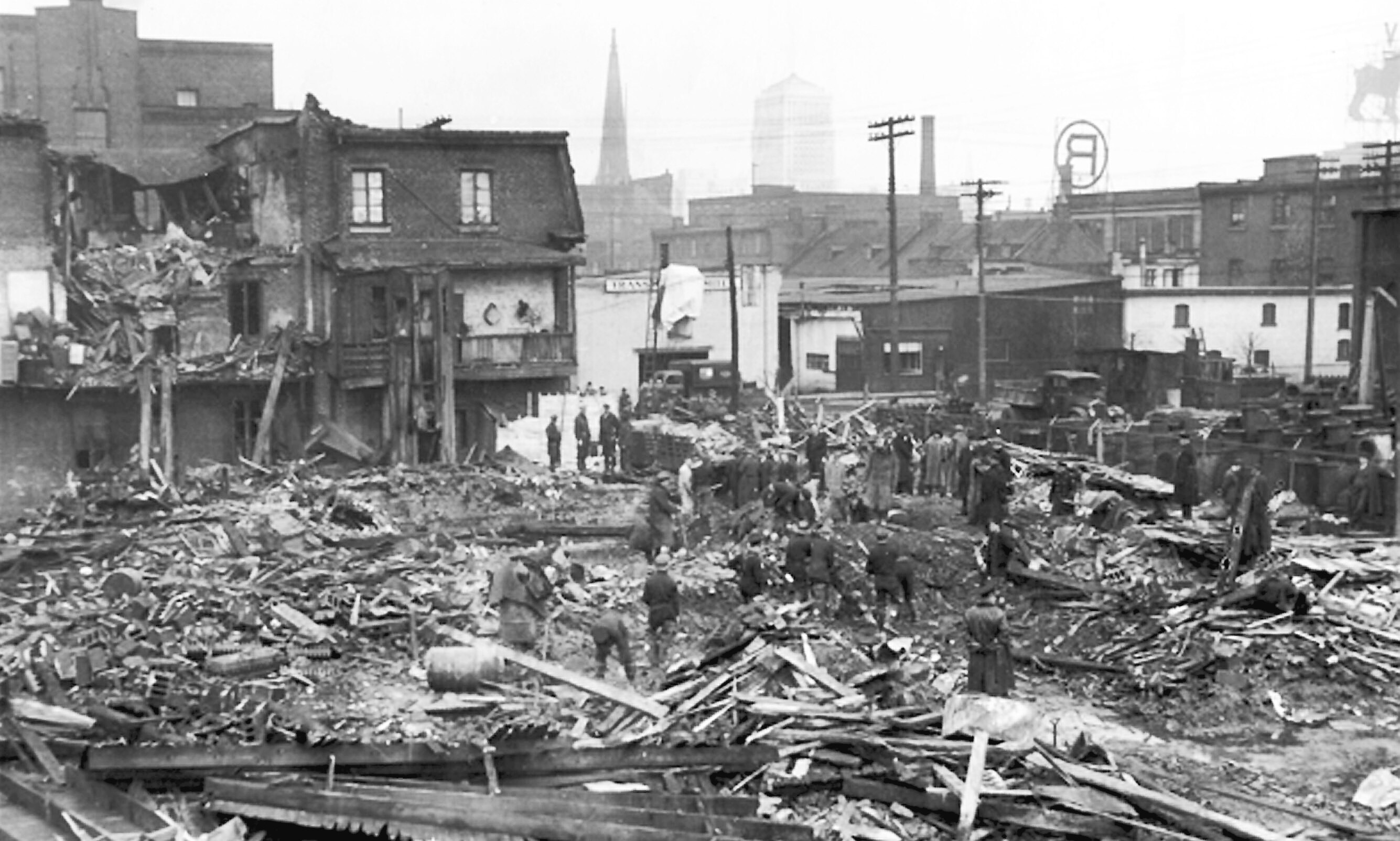
189 Colburne Street (now Peel Street), Montreal, April 25, 1944

On April 25, 1944, a Royal Air Force Liberator B Mark VI en route to Britain via Gander, Newfoundland crashed into the Griffintown neighborhood in downtown Montreal, Quebec minutes after taking off from Dorval Airport. The five-member crew and ten civilians on the ground were killed, and a large fire destroyed at least 10 homes.

== Aircraft ==
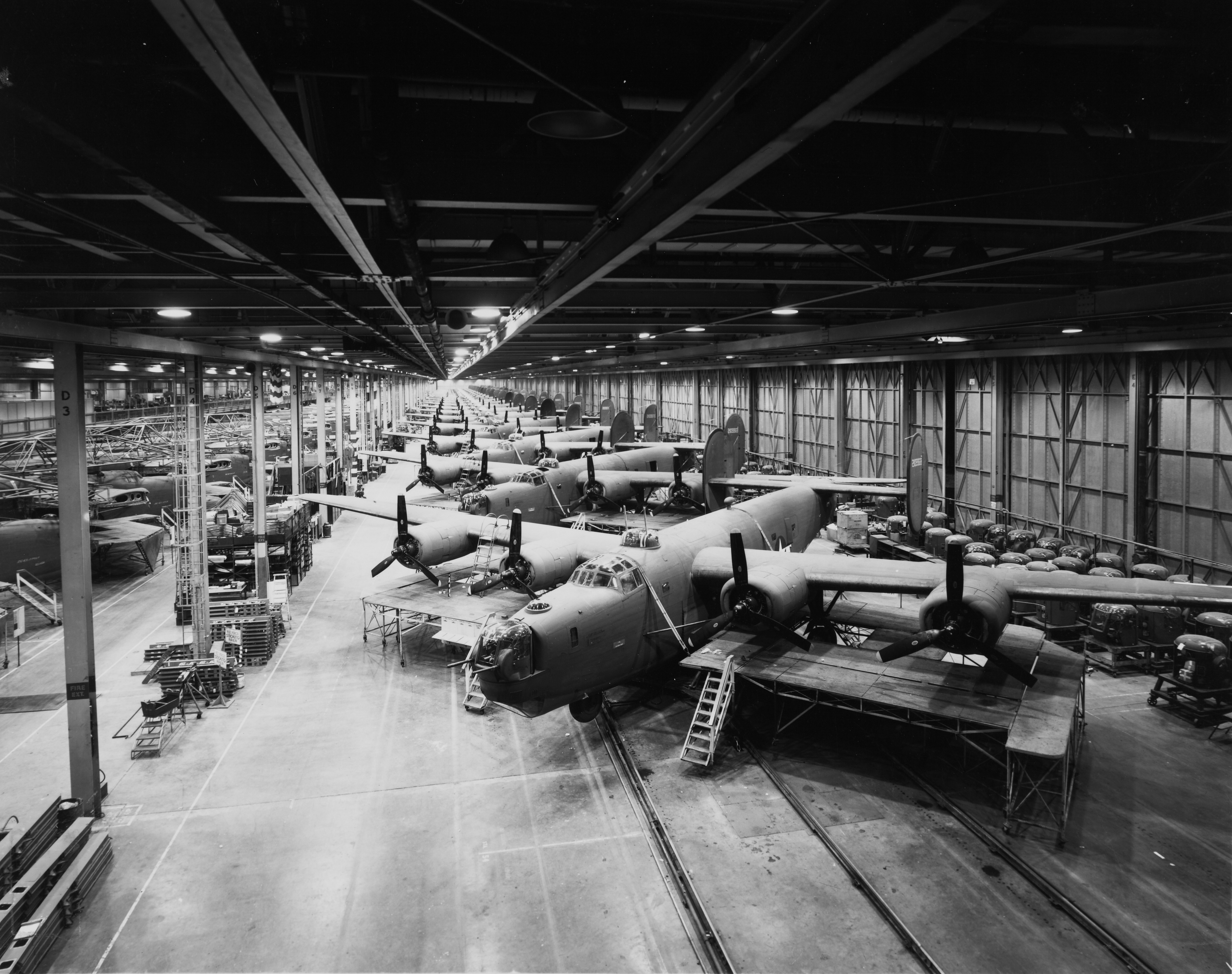
Consolidated B-24 Liberator assembly line, 1944

Between 1941 and 1945, over 9,000 aircraft from manufacturers all over North America passed through Montreal's Dorval airport where they were delivered by RAF Ferry Command across the Atlantic. This Consolidated Liberator B Mark VI, with RAF serial number EW148, had arrived from the Willow Run factory in Michigan, for delivery to RAF units in India. After leaving Dorval, the usual route in such cases was across the South Atlantic via Gander in Newfoundland, the Azores, Rabat in French Morocco, Libya, Palestine, Iraq, and Drigh Road in Karachi.

== Crash ==
Just after takeoff at 10:24 AM, the crew reported problems. The plane cleared Mount Royal but started to lose altitude over downtown Montreal. It passed in front of the Sun Life Building and narrowly missed the tower of Windsor Station and the chimney of the Dow Brewery. At 10:30, it struck residential buildings near the corner of Shannon Street and Ottawa Street. There was an explosion, and fire immediately broke out, spread by the 9,000 litres of fuel. Firefighters took hours to contain the blaze. In all, 10 to 15 homes were destroyed in the crash and subsequent fire.

== Victims ==
The flight crew all perished in the crash:

- Pilot Flight Lieutenant Kazimierz Burzynski, 41, was a Polish Air Force veteran of both World Wars, and was a flying instructor.
- Navigator Flight Lieutenant Adolf-Jan Nowicki, 31, had served in the Polish Air Force for five years and was a veteran of 40 bombing missions over Germany.
- Officer-Pilot Andrej Kuzniacki, 31, had been flying in the Polish Air Force since 1936, and had recently joined Ferry Command.
- Flight Engineer Sergeant Islwyn Jones, 23, born in Swansea, Wales, had served in the Royal Air Force since 1942, and was a veteran of Ferry Command.
- Radio Operator Officer-Pilot James Smith-Wilson, 21, born in Glasgow, Scotland, living in Trenton, New Jersey, had served in the Royal Canadian Air Force since 1942. This was his first trans-Atlantic flight.

Ten civilians on the ground were killed.

== Cause of the crash ==
The Ministry of Defense report cited structural failure of the tail section as the cause of the crash. Witnesses in the Sun Life Building described seeing part of the tail detached as it flew at low altitude apparently trying to reach the river to ditch.

== Cultural significance ==
=== In literature ===
- In The Spy Who Loved Me, Ian Fleming's ninth novel in his James Bond series, the narrator Vivienne Michel's backstory is she was orphaned at age 8 when her parents were both killed in a wartime air crash coming in to land at Montreal.

== See also ==
- Accidents and incidents involving the Consolidated B-24 Liberator
- RAF Ferry Command
