= Operation Woodlark =

1945 sabotage operation against a railway bridge in Norway

Coordinates: 64.1919°N 12.1924°E

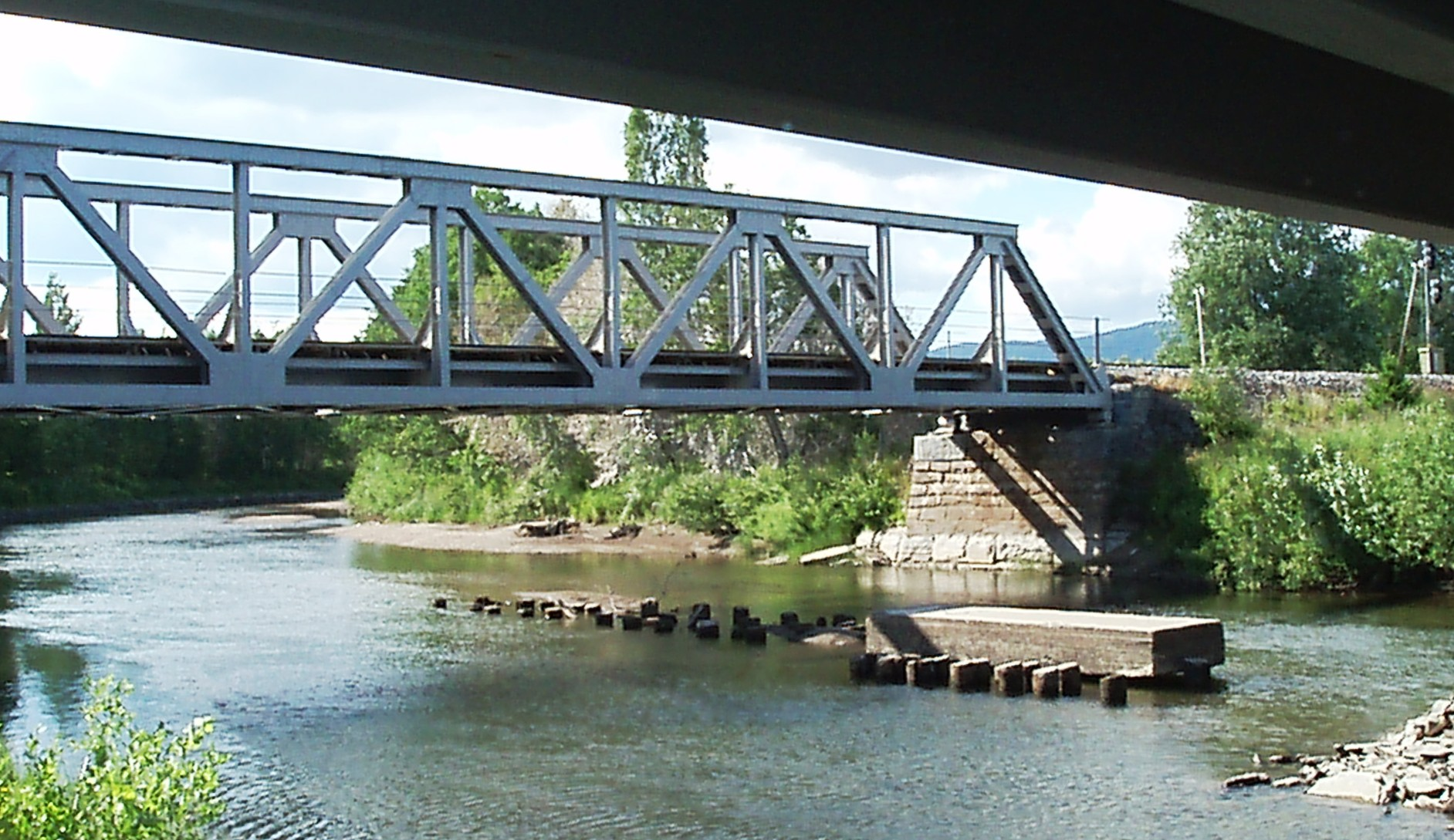
Jørstadelva Bridge

Operation Woodlark, also known as the Jørstadelva Bridge sabotage, was an operation carried out on 13 January 1945 by members of the Norwegian Independent Company 1 during the Second World War The aim was to blow up a railway bridge in order to disrupt the Nordland Line railway in Snåsa Municipality, Norway. Six hours after the bridge had been destroyed, a military troop train was derailed and crashed into the river below, killing 70–80 people (among them two Norwegians) and injuring some 100 more. It is the most deadly rail incident ever in Norway.

In the aftermath of the disaster, there were fights between German and US soldiers in the Snåsa mountains, the only fights in Norway between these two countries during the occupation (further info: Operasjon Rype). A war memorial of the sabotage was raised in 1995 at the site. Four out of the five saboteurs who had participated in the sabotage were present at the dedication of the memorial. Commanding officer Major William Colby led the NORSO I troops, who were mainly Norwegian nationals.

== See also ==
- Operasjon Rype
