= Operasjon Rype =

1945 US effort to sabotage Nazis occupying Norway

RYPE was the codename of the American airborne unit who in WW2 was dropped in the Norwegian mountains of Snåsa on March 24, 1945 to carry out sabotage actions behind enemy lines. From the base at the Gjefsjøen mountain farm, the group conducted successful railroad sabotages, with the intention of preventing the withdrawal of German forces from northern Norway. Rype was the only U.S. operation on Norwegian soil during WW2. The unit was part of Office of Strategic Services (OSS), a US intelligence agency during World War II and the forerunner of the Central Intelligence Agency (CIA). They consisted mainly of Norwegian Americans recruited from the 99th Infantry Battalion (United States) US Army and was led by later CIA boss William Colby. Today Task Force RYPE of the Norwegian Home Guard in Trøndelag has taken the name of the action. The building used as headquarter for Operasjon Rype has in the period 2018–2021 been under restoration.

== See also ==
- Operation Woodlark
