= The Man Nobody Knew =

- Directed by: Carl Colby
- Produced by: Carl Colby, David Johnson, Grace Guggenheim
- Narrated by: Carl Colby
- Cinematography: Gary Steele
- Edited by: Jay Freund
- Music by: Michael Bacon
- Production company: Act 4 Entertainment
- Distributed by: First Run Features
- Release date: September 23, 2011 (United States)
- Running time: 104 minutes
- Country: United States
- Language: English
- Box office: $183,342

The Man Nobody Knew: In Search of My Father, CIA Spymaster William Colby is a 2011 American documentary film exploring the life and career of former CIA director William Colby.

== Synopsis ==
Narrated by Carl Colby, son of the late Director of Central Intelligence William E. Colby, The Man Nobody Knew traces the elder Colby's career in the U.S. intelligence community, along with and in contrast to his home life, including the secrets he kept from his family.

The film begins with Colby's service in World War II as an officer and paratrooper with the OSS, and follows his rise through the Central Intelligence Agency, where his roles included political covert action to oppose the Communist Party in Italy, later counterinsurgency actions and involvement in the 1963 coup in South Vietnam (in concert with President John F. Kennedy) during the Vietnam War, and later as Director of Central Intelligence in the 1970s. During his brief, tumultuous tenure leading the agency, Colby revealed the existence of documents describing illegal activities by the CIA, known as the "Family Jewels", in an effort to reform the agency. The film concludes with Colby's disappearance and death in April 1996.

== Production ==
The Man Nobody Knew was produced by Carl Colby, with David Johnson and Grace Guggenheim, for Act 4 Entertainment. The film combines archival footage with new interviews, including Zbigniew Brzezinski, Brent Scowcroft, James R. Schlesinger, Donald Rumsfeld, Bob Woodward and Seymour Hersh, among others. William Colby's former wife and Carl Colby's mother, Barbara Colby, is also interviewed regarding Colby's public career and private life.

== Release ==
U.S. distribution rights were acquired by First Run Features. The film premiered at Lincoln Plaza Cinemas in New York City on September 23, 2011, and was followed by a national theatrical release.

== Reception ==
Reviews for The Man Nobody Knew have been favorable. Time Out New York called it a "tour of queasy, morally questionable intelligence endeavors over the last 50 years from the perspective of the spook community's grand pooh-bah." A review in The Village Voice stated that the film's "thorough investigation transcends [director Colby's] personal catharsis to become an enduring treatise on how character flaws affect policy." The Man Nobody Knew was designated a "Critics' Pick" by The New York Times' film reviewers.
