= 1967 Southern Alberta blizzard =

1967 blizzard in Alberta, Canada

- A military helicopter delivering aid to cattle during the 1967 blizzard

Meteorological history
- Formed: April 17, 1967; April 27, 1967
- Dissipated: April 20, 1967; April 29, 1967

Blizzard
- Highest gusts: 100 km/h (65 mph)
- Max. snowfall: 175 centimetres (69 in)

Overall effects
- Fatalities: 0 (30,000 cattle)
- Areas affected: Southern Alberta

The 1967 Southern Alberta blizzard was a harsh and devastating spring blizzard that struck southern Alberta on April 17-20, 1967 and on April 27-29, 1967. A record breaking 175 cm (69 in) of snow ravaged the southern part of the province, and wind accumulations reached up to 100 km/h (62 mph). Schools were closed, power was cut, roads were blocked, thousands of cattle died, and intense flooding happened. The blizzard is widely regarded as one of the most catastrophic blizzards in Canadian history.

== Incident ==
On the late morning of April 17, 1967, after an early season warm up, temperatures suddenly dropped a significant amount. Since the province was used to springtime in that time of year, cattle had been out on pastures regularly. That afternoon, heavy, blowing snow began to fall. The significant amount of snow quickly resulted in schools and businesses being closed down. Daily routines had abruptly stopped the more snow fell. Fences and roads became harder to see as snowfall went on, and a Canadian Pacific Railway train was sent to push a plow through the snow. This rescued about 30 drivers stranded in their cars unable to escape.

In the city of Lethbridge, Canadian Joint Operations Command was a dedicated radio station, providing 24 hour emergency messaging for citizens. The power cut out multiple times over the rest of the next few days. Farmers were apparently affected the most significantly, as the livestock, still out at pastures, froze where they stood in the open fields, and many got buried in the snow. Food and water supplies had also been limited.

Wind accumulations reached up to 100 km/h (62 mph) over the next few days. The blizzards severity reached a point where cattle were unable to forage for food, leading up to death. An estimated number of 30,000 cattles died across southern Alberta. The Canadian Army and the United States Army sent helicopters in an attempt to airlift food for the cattle, but the cattle had already been dead.

On April 20, 1967, 3 days after the storm starting, the blizzard had temporarily stopped, with snow covering everything in sight. However, the snow had not melted, and the temperature did not warm up. On April 27, before the pack of snow could clear, a second intense blizzard arrived. On April 29, the second and last blizzard stopped, and helicopters were sent, providing groceries, medicine, food and fuel to stranded citizens of Alberta. The snowfall had reached a complete total of 175 cm (69 in), or 5 feet and 9 inches of snow, being just shy of 182 cm (72 in), or 6 feet 0 inches.

== Aftermath ==
Following the disaster, temperatures eventually became warm enough for snow to start melting. This caused significant widespread seasonal flooding across southern Alberta. On May 15, 1967, the federal revenue minister gave citizens a "blizzard mercy", granting the residents of southern Alberta a two-week extension on their income tax filing deadline.
