= 1963 Hanmer explosion =

1963 explosion in Ontario, Canada

- Date: 1 August 1963
- Time: 4:17 pm (EDT)
- Location: Hanmer, Ontario, Canada
- Type: Gas explosion
- Cause: Leaking gasoline ignited by a spark from a Sump pump switch
- Deaths: 8
- Injuries: 6

The 1963 Hanmer explosion occurred in the afternoon of August 1, 1963, in the town of Hanmer in the Canadian province of Ontario. An unattended fuel truck spilled gasoline into the basement of the Matte service station while filling its underground tanks, and the fuel was later ignited when an automatic sump pump switched on.

The explosion destroyed the service station, as well as the attached lunch counter. Eight people, including five children, were killed in the blast and subsequent fire, and a further six people were injured. The explosion was the worst disaster in the region since the 1951 Coniston bus crash.

A coroner's jury later found Shell Canada, as well as fuel truck driver Edward Thorpe, partly responsible for the explosion. Thorpe was also praised for quickly moving the fuel truck to prevent a second explosion.

== Background ==
The Matte service station was located on what was then Ontario Highway 69 (now Municipal Road 80) in the Town of Hanmer (now part of Greater Sudbury) southeast of the intersection with Desmarais Road, in an area called Ross' Corners or Gauthier's Corners. The station was owned and operated by Earle Matte, and the attached lunch counter was operated by Earle's wife, Delilah. The lunch counter was described as being a popular meeting place for adults and teenagers in the area.

== Explosion ==
In the afternoon of August 1, 1963, Shell Canada fuel truck driver Edward Thorpe arrived at the service station to deliver gasoline. While the truck filled the underground tanks by gravity flow, Thorpe went into the restaurant to have a pop. A customer entered and reported that the truck was overfilling the gas tanks, and it was discovered that gasoline was running on the ground and spilling into the basement of the service station. Thorpe stopped the gas flow, and went into the basement to assist with cleaning up the gasoline. The gasoline, estimated to be around 400 imperial gallons (1,800 L), was hosed down into a sump pit by Thorpe and two teenagers, Rene Menard and John Ross.

After all three left the basement, the sump pump was switched on by the filling of the pit, and the fuel was ignited by the spark of the switch. The explosion occurred at 4:17pm and immediately destroyed the service station, lifting the building off of its foundation. Homes in the area shook, and windows at a nearby shopping centre were smashed. Thorpe, with part of his clothes on fire, moved the fuel truck away from the destroyed station, preventing the truck and underground fuel tanks from exploding.

== Casualties ==
Seven of the victims were killed instantly in the explosion, with an eighth victim, 14 year old Linda Duguay, dying later that day in hospital. Earle Matte, the owner of the service station, was not present when the explosion occurred. His wife, Delilah Matte, who operated the lunch counter, and their 4-year-old daughter Norma were killed. Delilahs sister, Estelle, her 17 month old son Vincent, and their mother Alma D'Amour, were also killed, as well as 15 year old Jo-Anne Marois and 15 year old Raymond Genereux, who had started working at the station 2 days prior. A further 6 people were injured, but survived.

== Aftermath ==
At a coroner's jury on August 12, a jury found "a degree of negligence" by Edward Thorpe and Shell Canada. It was determined that the amount of gas in the underground tank was not measured beforehand, and that Shell Canada did not provide sufficient training requiring their drivers to stay with their trucks during the filling of tanks. Thorpe was also praised for quickly moving the truck away from the destroyed service station, which prevented another explosion.

== See also ==
- List of disasters in Canada
- List of explosions
