= Hospice Sainte-Cunégonde =

Nursing home and orphanage

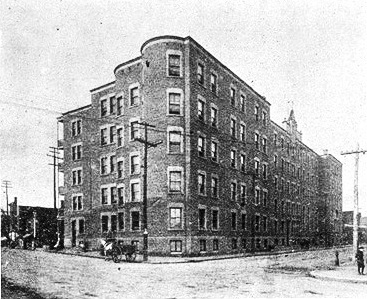
- Hospice Sainte-Cunégonde in 1902
- Interactive map of the Hospice Sainte-Cunégonde area

General information
- Location: 2625 Albert Street (now 2625 Lionel-Groulx Avenue), Sainte-Cunégonde (now Montreal), Canada
- Coordinates: 45.483370°N 73.578864°W
- Construction started: April 30, 1895
- Opened: September 26, 1896
- Destroyed: June 15, 1951

Height
- Height: 6 storeys

Technical details
- Floor area: 290 feet (88 m) x 50 feet (15 m)

Hospice Sainte-Cunégonde (or Hospice de Sainte-Cunégonde, or Asile de Sainte-Cunégonde) was an orphanage, child care centre and nursing home for the destitute in Montreal's Sainte-Cunégonde neighbourhood, today known as Little Burgundy. It was operated by the Grey Nuns, a Roman Catholic religious order based in Montreal. The hospice was established in 1889 in the former Brewster mansion, and moved in 1896 to its own building at 2625 Albert Street at the corner of Atwater Avenue. Albert Street is today named Lionel-Groulx Avenue. The building had a stone facade but its interior structure was built of timber.

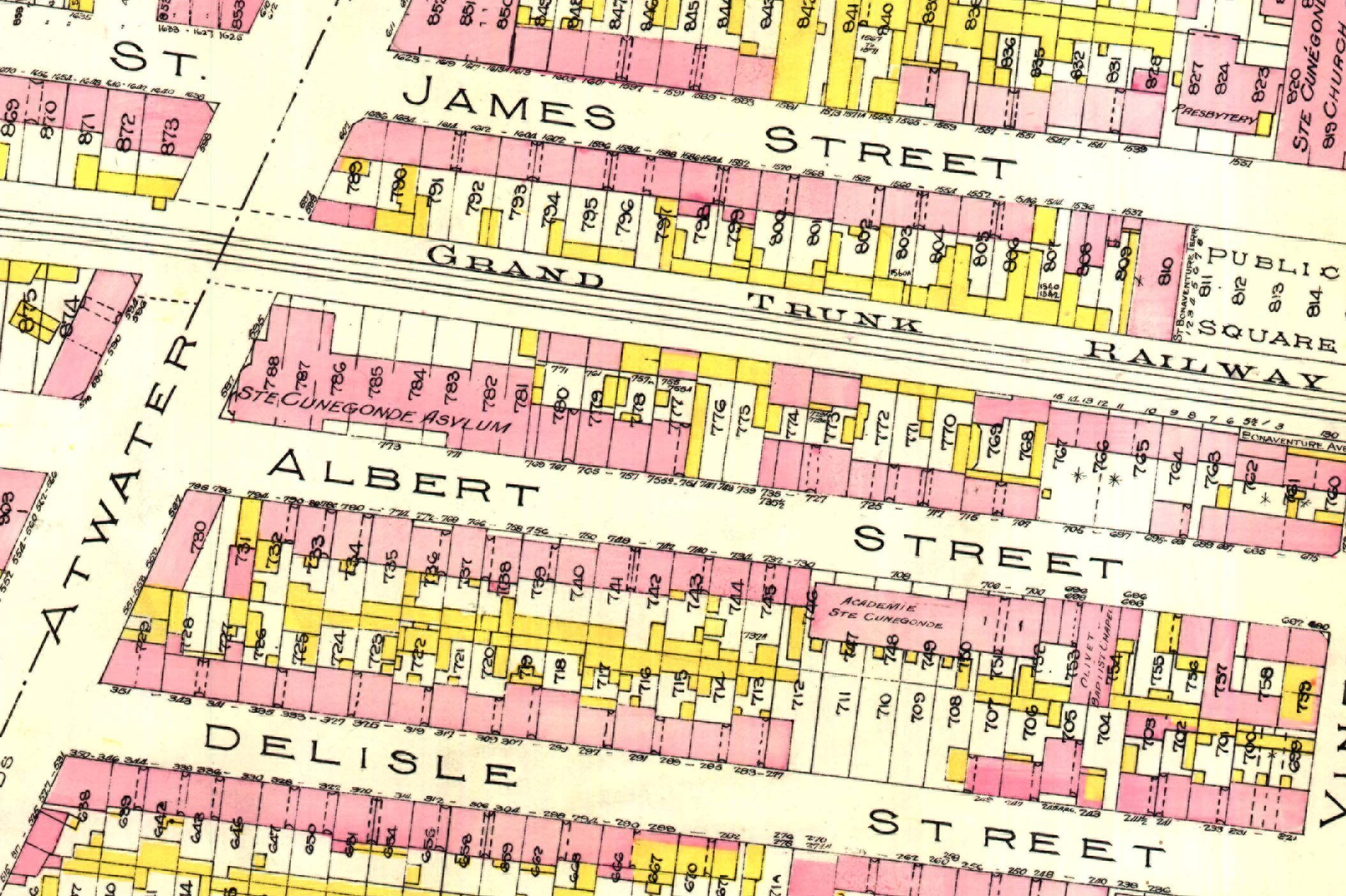
Page from a 1912 atlas of Montreal published by Chas. E. Goad Co. that calls the hospice "Ste. Cunegonde Asylum".

On June 15, 1951, the building was destroyed by fire. 35 people were killed in the fire, including six nuns.
