= 99th Infantry Battalion (United States) =

Norwegian-speaking US Army battalion of WW2

- Coat of arms of the 99th Infantry Battalion
- Active: July 1942 – 1945; September 1956 - March 1958
- Allegiance: United States of America
- Branch: United States Army
- Type: Separate infantry battalion
- Nickname: The Viking Battalion
- Engagements: World War II: Normandy; Northern France; Rhineland; Ardennes-Alsace; Central Europe
- Decorations: Presidential Unit Citation Belgian Croix de Guerre French Croix de Guerre

The 99th Infantry Battalion (Separate) was a battalion of Norwegian-speaking soldiers in the US Army. Created in July 1942 at Camp Ripley, Minnesota, the battalion originally consisted of 1,001 soldiers. The battalion was attached to the First Army; however, it was labeled "Separate" because it was not attached to a specific regiment.

== Background ==
After the attack on Pearl Harbor, the War Department considered how the military could use foreigners and bilingual, first-generation immigrants from German-occupied areas to assist the war effort. The initial assessment concluded that it would be "un-American" to train foreign troops on US soil, prompting the Norwegian government to refuse a request to recruit Norwegians in the United States for military training in Canada. After a time, however, the War Department decided to set up special units of US citizens from certain ethnic groups for operations in countries occupied by the Axis powers.

The following five battalions, established in 1942, were organized based on ethnic groups:

- 1st Filipino Infantry Battalion: Filipino (the nucleus of later 1st and 2nd Filipino infantry regiments)
- 99th Infantry Battalion (separate): Norwegian
- 100th Infantry Battalion (separate): Japanese
- 101st Infantry Battalion (separate): Austrian (dissolved in 1943 before active service)
- 122nd Infantry Battalion (separate): Greek

A Polish unit was also proposed, but never created. Other ethnicities were also suggested. On July 29, 1942, William Schaefer, a representative of the Office of Strategic Services, visited the Lithuanian consul in Chicago, Petras Daužvardis, with a proposal. Schaefer talked about the possibility for Lithuanians to contribute to the "special war service" that was being organized by the OSS and that, in addition to Lithuanians, people from other German-occupied territories were also being recruited: Dutch, Belgians, Danes, Norwegians, Poles, Yugoslavs, Greeks, Czechs, and anti-Nazi Germans. It remains unclear why the project never came to fruition and rather successful formation of a Polish-American Battalion was stopped in late 1942.

== Personnel ==
In Norwegian historiography, the men of the 99th Infantry Battalion are often referred to as "Norwegian-Americans." This is only partially correct; the original intention was to transfer as many voluntary "Norwegian nationals" who had begun the immigration process (a condition of enlistment) to the unit from existing armies as could be acquired. In her book, The 99th Battalion, the Norwegian novelist Gerd Nyquist estimates that first-generation Norwegian immigrants may have constituted 50 percent of the original force – about 500 men. One of Nyquist's sources from the battalion said 40 percent of the battalion had been Norwegian citizens (around 400 soldiers). This figure was the result of an informal survey conducted by Nyquist; however, the survey was limited to 152 respondents. Based on information from a veteran of the battalion, Max Hermansen argues in his book D-dagen 1944 og norsk innsats that there were approximately 300 Norwegians in the battalion.

== Training ==
In October, 1942, the battalion moved to Fort Snelling, Minnesota; and again in December, 1942, to Camp Hale in Colorado for training in winter warfare and alpine warfare. On 5 September 1943, the 99th Infantry Battalion was shipped out from New York to Scotland. In the UK, the battalion was stationed in Perham Down Camp in Wiltshire, between Salisbury and Andover. The training there was for infantry purposes as D-Day approached, and it became increasingly clear that the battalion would receive its baptism by fire in Operation Overlord.

== OSS Norwegian Special Operations Group ==
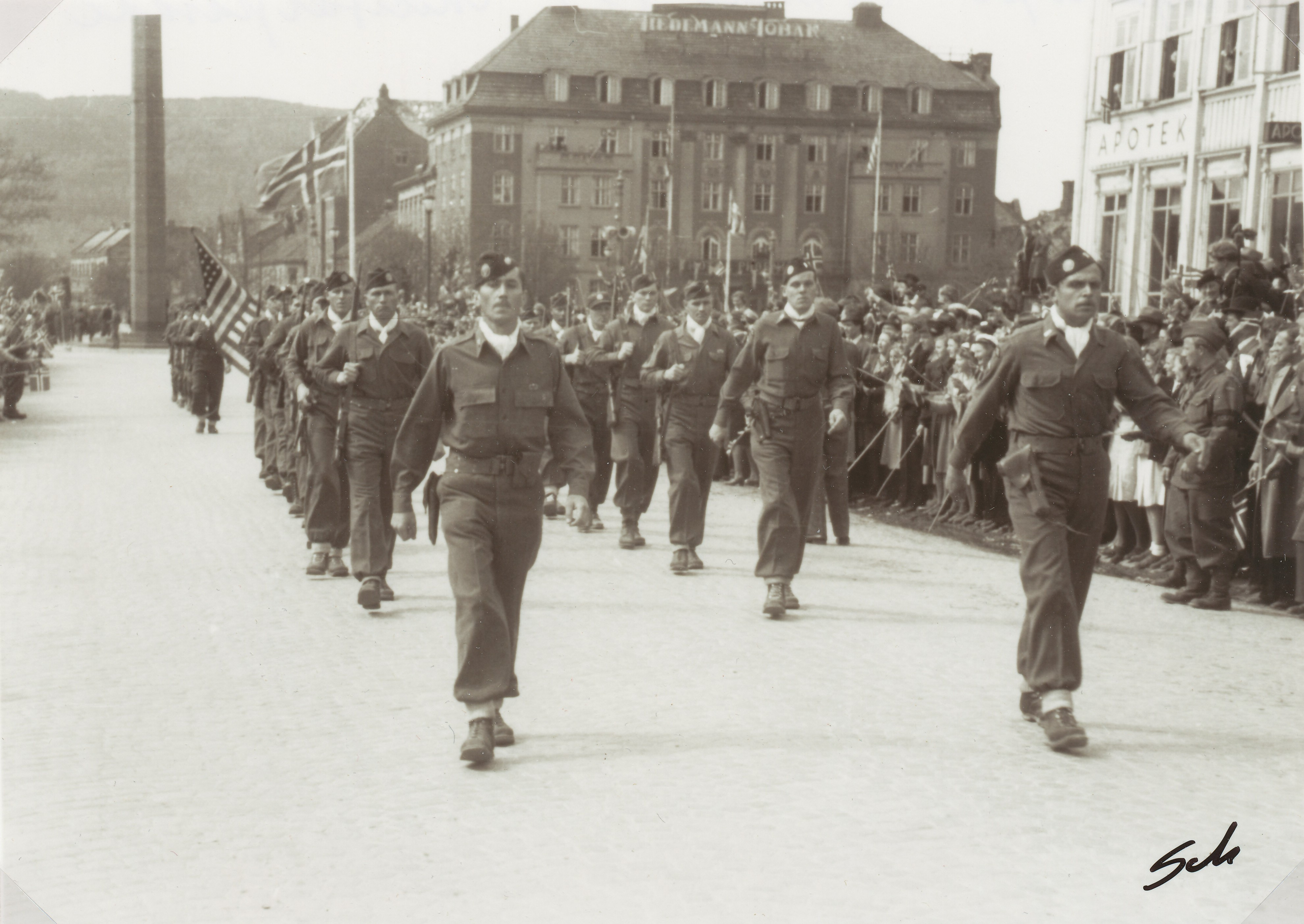
Major William Colby (front left) & the Norwegian Special Operations Group parading in Trondheim on the 17th of May 1945.

During the stay at Camp Hale in 1943, the Office of Strategic Services (OSS) asked for volunteers from the battalion. The OSS selected 80 enlisted men and twelve officers for what would become OSS Norwegian Special Operations Group (NORSOG). OSS special operations groups were the Americans' counterpart to Britain's Special Operations Executive. NORSOG was initially intended for action in Norway, but, by 1944, the group was instead used in operations behind German lines in France. In early 1945, NORSOG operated in Norway where they performed railway sabotage until the liberation (Operation Lapwing, also known as Operation Grouse).

== In combat ==
The 99th Infantry Battalion landed on Omaha Beach on the evening of 22 June 1944, and then took part in the final battle for Cherbourg. As a "separate" battalion, it belonged to no regiment, but was attached to different formations as needed. From September, the battalion operated in Belgium. During Christmas 1944, the battalion was involved in the Battle of the Bulge.

The battalion participated in the following campaigns:

- Normandy: 22 June 1944 – 24 July 1944
- Northern France: 25 June 1944 – 14 September 1944
- Rhineland (Würzlen–Aachen): 15 September 1944 – 16 December 1944
- Ardennes–Alsace: 17 December 1944 – 18 January 1945
- Central Europe: 4 April 1945 – 11 May 1945

The following individual decorations and medals were awarded to members of the 99th Infantry Battalion:

- 15 Silver Stars
- 20 Bronze Stars
- 305 Purple Hearts
- 763 Good Conduct Medals
- 814 Combat Infantry badges

== 474th Regiment ==
On 19 January 1945, the 99th Infantry Battalion joined the 474th Infantry Regiment in Child-sur-Mer. The regiment was recently formed, partly to prepare for a possible invasion of Norway in the event of a partial German withdrawal from Norway. At this point, the German forces in Norway evacuated and burned Finnmark, and retreated behind the Lyngen Line. A scenario where the Germans had to retreat south of Dovre, making it possible to establish the Norwegian government in Trondheim, seemed likely.

On 2 April, the regiment moved to Aachen, in Germany. The 99th Infantry Battalion's tasks consisted mainly of patrolling and the suppression of pockets of continued German resistance until 11 May.

Between 15 and 18 April 1945, the 474th Infantry Regiment, including the 99th Infantry Battalion, was responsible for the transportation of Nazi treasures found at the Merkers mine. The convoy, named "Task Force Hansen," transported 3,762 bags of currency, 8,307 gold bars, 3,326 bags of gold coins, and numerous bags of silver, platinum, jewelry and art treasures to a safe place in the Frankfurt area.

== Post-War ==
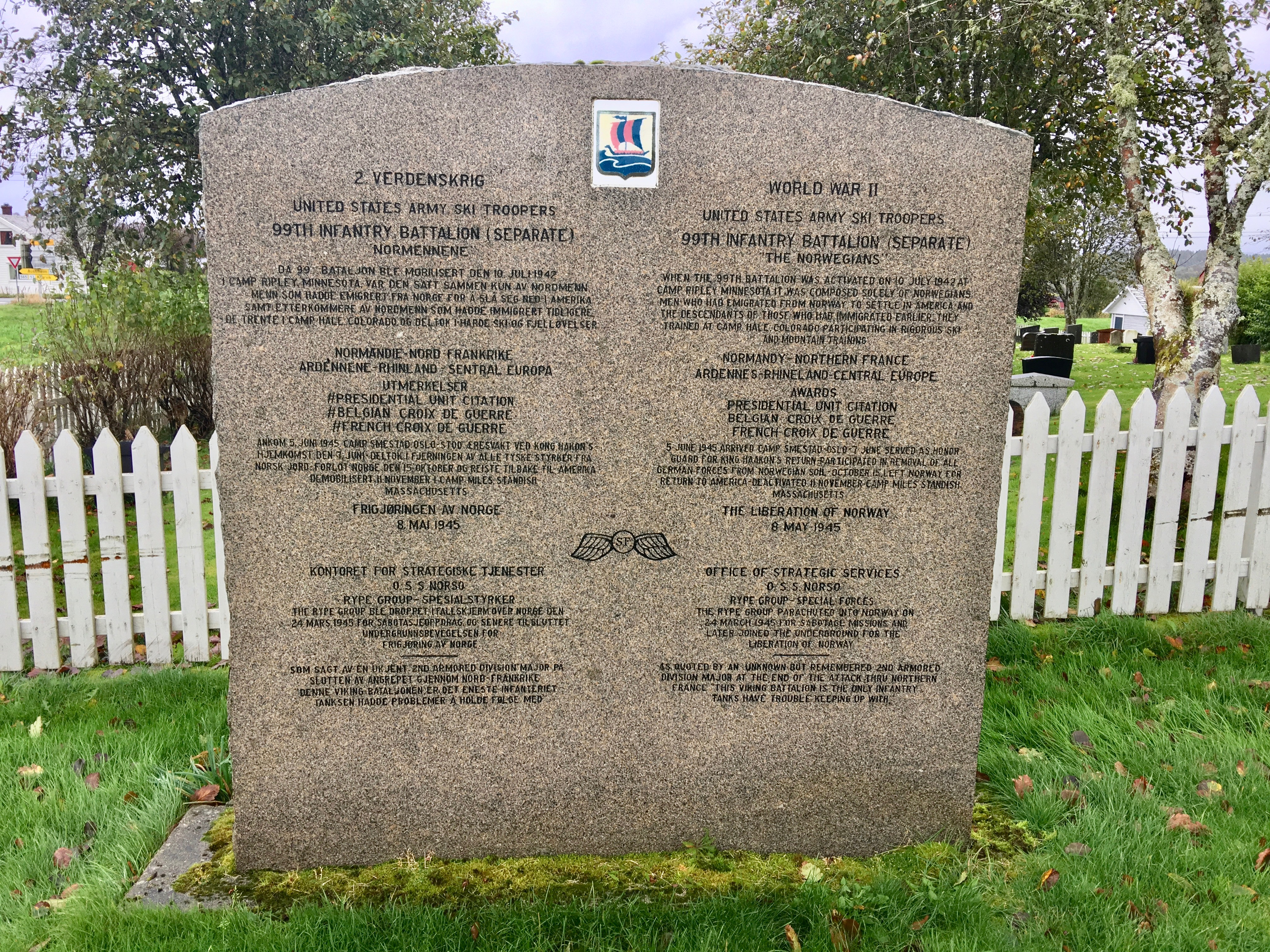
Memorial stone to the 99th Infantry Battalion, Radøy, Vestland, Norway

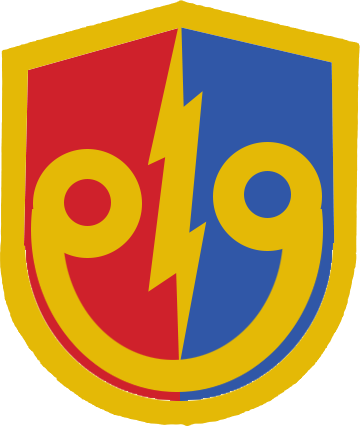
SSI of the 99th Battalion Combat Team at Fort Rucker

The 99th Infantry Battalion was reactivated at Fort Rucker, Alabama on 30 September 1956, when the 351st Infantry Regiment was inactivated and the infantry force on post reduced to battalion strength. It remained active for only a short while, however, and on 24 March 1958 it was inactivated, with its personnel and equipment being reorganized as the 2d Battle Group, 31st Infantry when the Army adopted the Pentomic organizational concept. Like the 351st before it and the 31st that followed, the 99th was a unit organized for Aviation Center training support at Fort Rucker.

== Literature ==
The unit is covered in various works, including:

- Olaf Minge, Kyle Ward, Erik Brun editors: The Viking Battalion: Norwegian American Ski Troopers in World War II (2023).
- Gerd Nyquist: Bataljon 99 (1981) (Norwegian) / 99th Battalion (2014) (English)
- Howard R. Bergen: 99th Infantry Battalion US Army (1945).
- Sgt. John Kelly: Company 'D' United States Army (1945).
- Sharon Wells Wagner: Red Wells, An American Soldier in World War 2 (2006).
- Bruce H. Heimark: The OSS Norwegian Special Operations Group in World War II (1994).
- Knut Flovik Thoresen: Soldat på vestfronten, historien om Alf Dramstad (2010) (Norwegian).
- Robert A. Pisani: The Canal Drive, The 99th Infantry Battalion and the Liberation of Belgian Limburg, September 1944 (2012).
- Gerd Nyquist, 99th Battalion: The Long Way Home
