= Black Cat (aircraft) =

American B-24 bomber in World War II

Coordinates: 48.96635°N 12.13180°E

General information
- Type: Consolidated B-24J-1-FO Liberator
- Manufacturer: Willow Run, Ford Motor Company
- Owners: United States Army Air Forces
- Serial: 42-95592

History
- In service: – 21 April 1945
- Fate: Shot down over Germany

Black Cat was a Consolidated B-24J-1-FO Liberator (Note: The B-24J was the main production model of the Liberator, accounting for more than a third of all B-24s built. Each factory that built B-24s had a unique code, applied as a suffix to the model number at the time the aircraft was built; -FO denotes a B-24 built by Ford at Willow Run.) aircraft and the last American bomber to be shot down over Germany in World War II. It was one of thousands of B-24s produced by the Ford Motor Company at its Willow Run production plant.

== Background ==
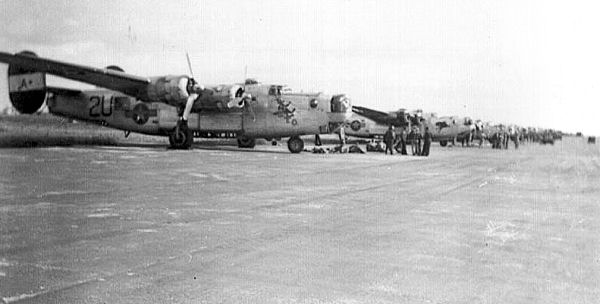
B-24s of the 785th Bomb Squadron, 466th Bomb Group, at RAF Attlebridge, England.

In April 1945, General Dwight D. Eisenhower and SHAEF were convinced Hitler and other die-hard Nazis were planning to make a last stand in the Alps near Berchtesgaden. In order to prevent this happening, and because the European strategic air war was over, the Allied air forces tried to prevent the Germans from concentrating remaining men and materials in Bavaria.

== Fatal mission ==
On 21 April 1945 at around 0630 local time 137 B-24 bombers from the 466th Bombardment Group departed from their base at Attlebridge in Norfolk, England to bomb a railway bridge in Salzburg, Austria. Within the formation, Black Cat led the third squadron. However once the target was reached four hours later, the mission had to be abandoned due to the heavy cloud and thunderstorms covering the area. The lead aircraft flew a return course over Regensburg. This decision was queried by several navigators in the formation because Regensburg was a heavily bombed and defended city: it was home to the Messerschmitt factory which had been the Eighth Air Force's first major bombing target of the war in August 1943. At 20,000 feet above Regensburg, the formation received eight bursts of flak. Black Cat was the only casualty. It was struck by a shell on the left wing causing the aircraft to crash. Ten of the crew were killed including the pilot, Richard Farrington. The tail gunner, Albert Seraydarian, and the bombardier, Chris Manners, survived and were liberated from German POW camps within a few weeks.

== Wayside cross ==
At the crash site, a wayside cross with a plaque was erected to commemorate the dead.

== Commemorative stamp ==
Surviving members of the 466th Bomb Group petitioned the U.S. Postal Service to release a postage stamp depicting Black Cat in flight. The stamp was released in 2005.
