= William Colby =

Director of the Central Intelligence Agency (CIA) from 1973 to 1976

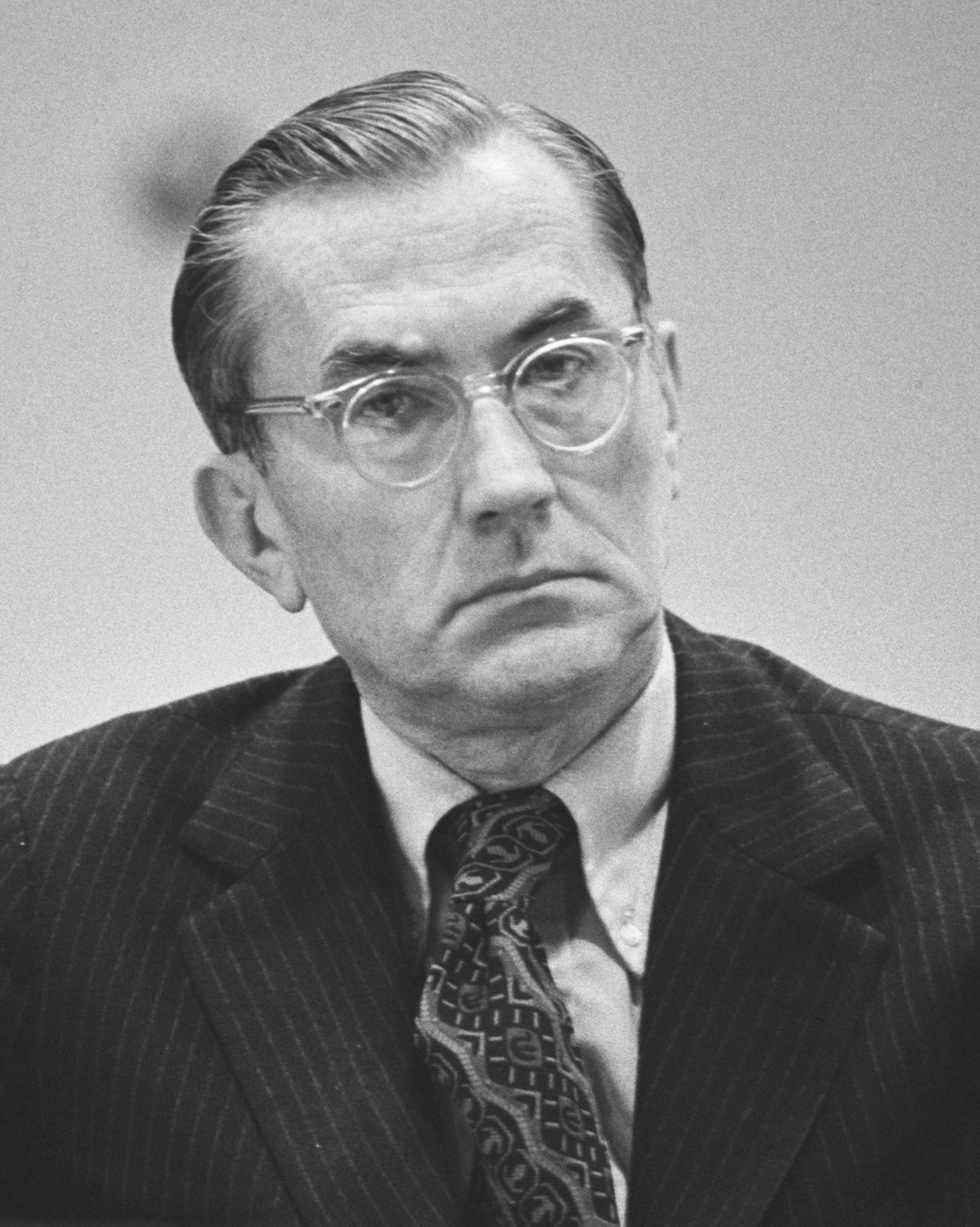
- Colby in 1975

10th Director of Central Intelligence
- In office September 4, 1973 – January 30, 1976
- President: Richard Nixon; Gerald Ford
- Deputy: Vernon A. Walters
- Preceded by: Vernon A. Walters (acting)
- Succeeded by: George H. W. Bush

Deputy Director of Central Intelligence for Operations
- In office March 2, 1973 – August 24, 1973
- President: Richard Nixon
- Preceded by: Thomas Karamessines
- Succeeded by: William E. Nelson

Personal details
- Born: William Egan Colby; January 4, 1920 Saint Paul, Minnesota, U.S.
- Died: May 6, 1996 (aged 76) Rock Point, Maryland, U.S.
- Resting place: Arlington National Cemetery
- Spouse(s): Barbara Heinzen (1945–1984); Sally Shelton (1984–1996)
- Children: 5 (with Heinzen)
- Relatives: Elbridge Colby (grandson)
- Education: Princeton University (BA); Columbia University (LLB)

Military service
- Branch/service: United States Army
- Unit: Office of Strategic Services
- Battles/wars: World War II

William Egan Colby (January 4, 1920 – May 6, 1996) was an American intelligence officer who served as Director of Central Intelligence (DCI) from September 1973 to January 1976. During World War II, Colby served with the Office of Strategic Services. After the war, he joined the newly created Central Intelligence Agency (CIA).

Before and during the Vietnam War, Colby served as chief of station in Saigon, chief of the CIA's Far East Division, and head of the Civil Operations and Rural Development effort and oversaw the Phoenix Program. After the war, Colby became Director of Central Intelligence (DCI) and, during his tenure, under intense pressure from the Congress and the media, adopted a policy of relative openness about U.S. intelligence activities to the Senate Church Committee and the House Pike Committee. Colby served as DCI under presidents Richard Nixon and Gerald Ford until January 30, 1976, and was succeeded at the CIA by George H. W. Bush.

== Early life ==
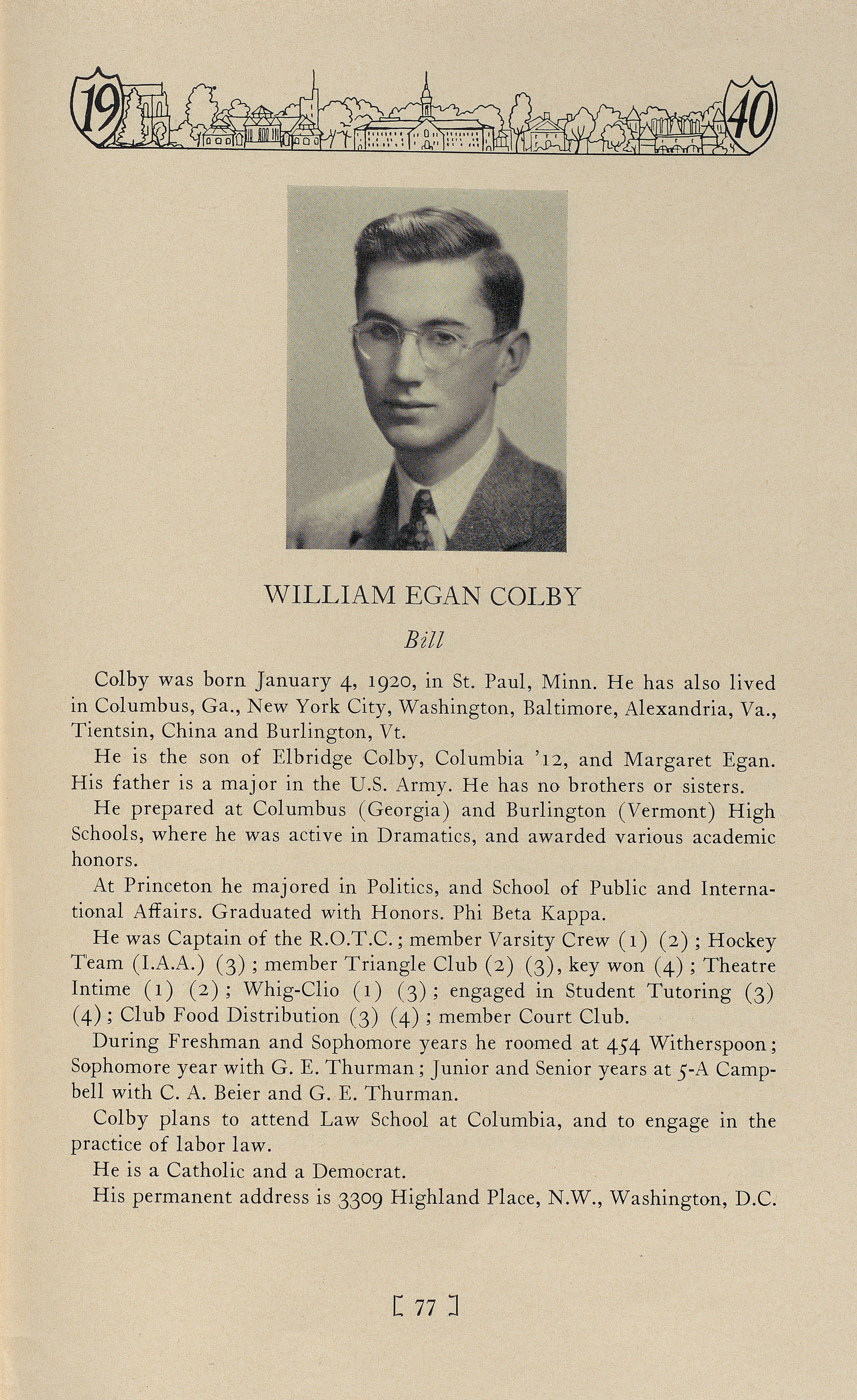
Colby in the Princeton University yearbook, 1940

Colby was born in Saint Paul, Minnesota, in 1920. His father, Elbridge Colby, who came from a New England family with a history of military and public service, was a professor of English, an author, and a military officer who served in the U.S. Army and in university positions in Tianjin, China; Georgia; Vermont; and Washington, D.C. Though a career officer, Elbridge Colby's professional pursuits focused less on strictly military activities and more on intellectual and scholarly contributions to military and literary subjects. Elbridge's father, Charles Colby, had been a professor of chemistry at Columbia University but had died prematurely and left his family largely without money. Colby's mother, Margaret Egan, was from an Irish family in St. Paul active in business and Democratic Party politics. With his Army father, William Colby had a peripatetic upbringing before attending public high school in Burlington, Vermont. He then attended Princeton University and graduated with an A.B. in politics in 1940 after completing a 196-page long senior thesis, "Surrender – French Policy toward the Spanish Civil War", in which he sharply criticized France for failing to support the Second Spanish Republic in the civil war. He then studied at Columbia Law School the following year. Colby recounted that he took from his parents a desire to serve and a commitment to liberal politics, Catholicism, and independence, exemplified by his father's career-damaging protest in The Nation regarding the lenient treatment of a white Georgian who had murdered a black U.S. soldier who was also based at Fort Benning.

== Personal life ==
Colby was for his entire life a staunch Catholic. He was often referred to as "the warrior–priest". The Catholic Church played a "central role" in his family's life, with Colby's two daughters receiving their First Communion at St. Peter's Basilica. He married Barbara Heinzen (1920–2015) in 1945 and they had five children. His daughter, Christine, was presented as a debutante to high society in 1978 at the International Debutante Ball at the Waldorf-Astoria Hotel in New York City. In 1984, he divorced Barbara and married American diplomat Sally Shelton-Colby.

== Career ==
=== Office of Strategic Services ===
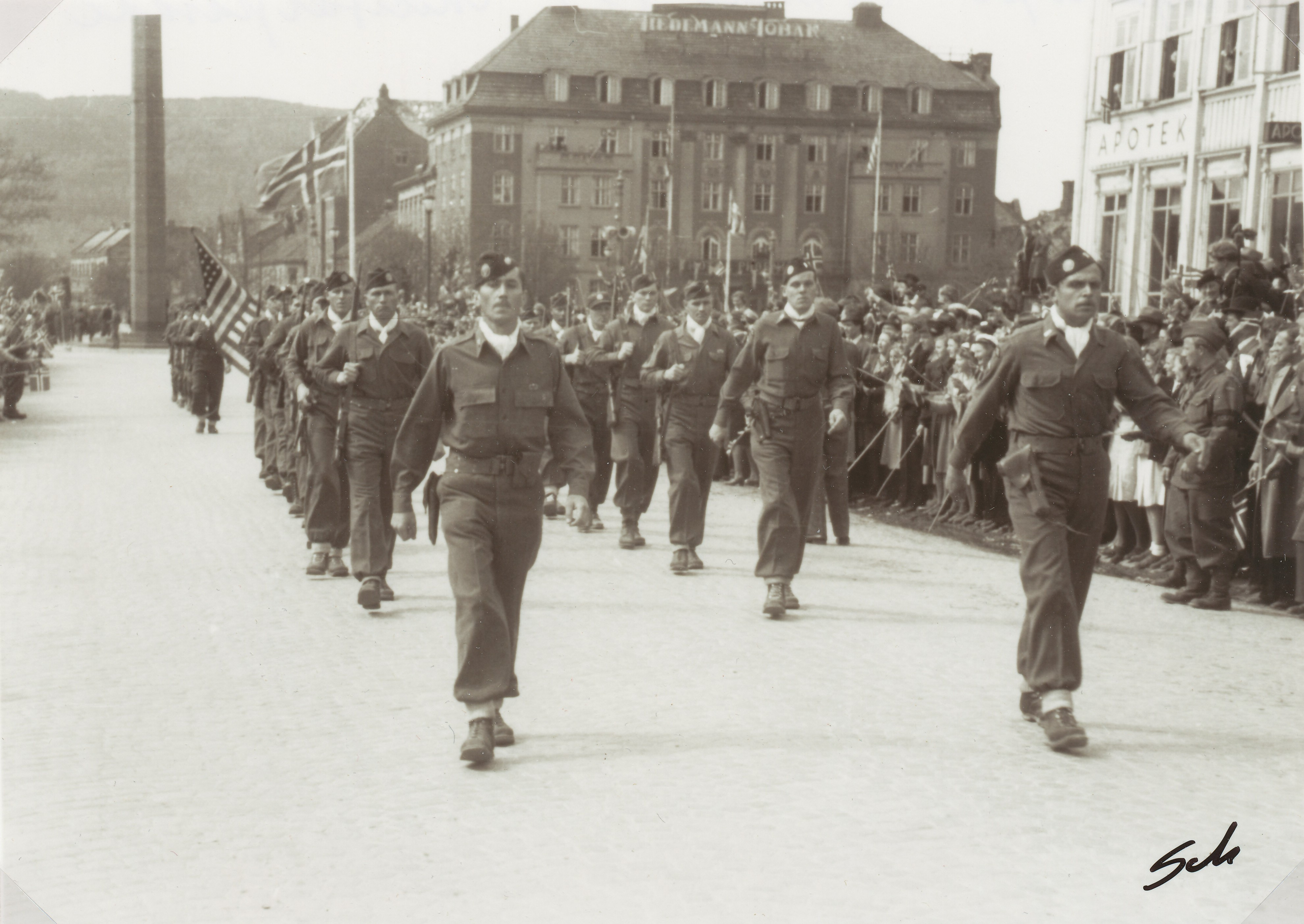
Major William Colby (front left) & the Norwegian Special Operations Group parading in Trondheim on the 17th of May 1945.

Following his first year at Columbia, in 1941 Colby volunteered for active duty with the United States Army and served with the Office of Strategic Services (OSS) as a "Jedburgh," or special operator, who was trained to work with resistance forces in occupied Europe to harass German and other Axis forces. During World War II, he parachuted behind enemy lines twice and earned the Silver Star as well as commendations from Norway, France, and Great Britain. In his first mission he deployed to France as a Jedburgh commanding Team BRUCE, in mid-August 1944, and operated with the Maquis until he joined up with Allied forces later that fall. In April 1945, he led the NORSO Group Operasjon Rype into Norway on a sabotage mission to destroy railway lines in an effort to hinder German forces in Norway from reinforcing the final defense of Germany. After the war, Colby graduated from Columbia Law School and then briefly practiced law in William J. Donovan's New York firm, Donovan, Leisure, Newton & Irvine. Bored by the practice of law and inspired by his liberal beliefs, he moved to Washington to work for the National Labor Relations Board.

=== Central Intelligence Agency ===
==== Post-war Europe ====
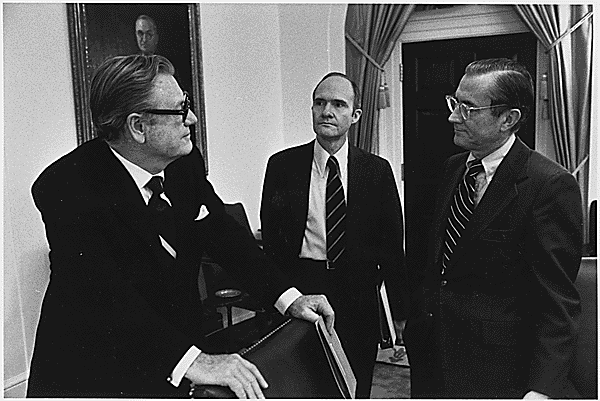
Director of Central Intelligence William Colby discusses the situation in Vietnam with Vice President Nelson Rockefeller and Deputy Assistant For National Security Affairs Brent Scowcroft during a break in a meeting of the National Security Council, 04/24/1975

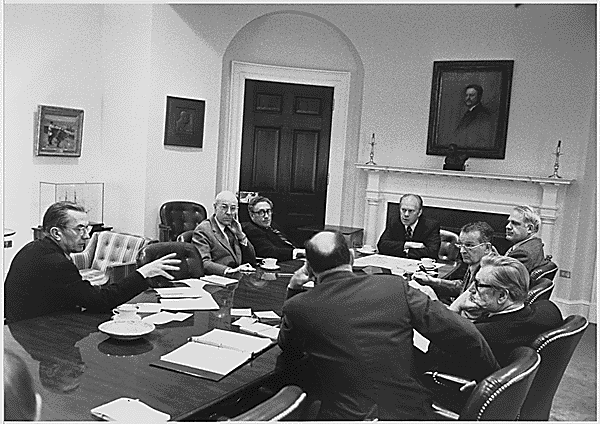
William Colby, Director of Central Intelligence, briefs President Gerald Ford and his senior advisors on the deteriorating situation in Vietnam, April 28, 1975. (clockwise, left to right) Colby; Robert S. Ingersoll, Deputy Secretary of State; Henry Kissinger; President Ford; James R. Schlesinger, Defense Secretary; William Clements, Deputy Secretary of Defense; Vice President Rockefeller; and General George S. Brown, Chairman of the Joint Chiefs of Staff.

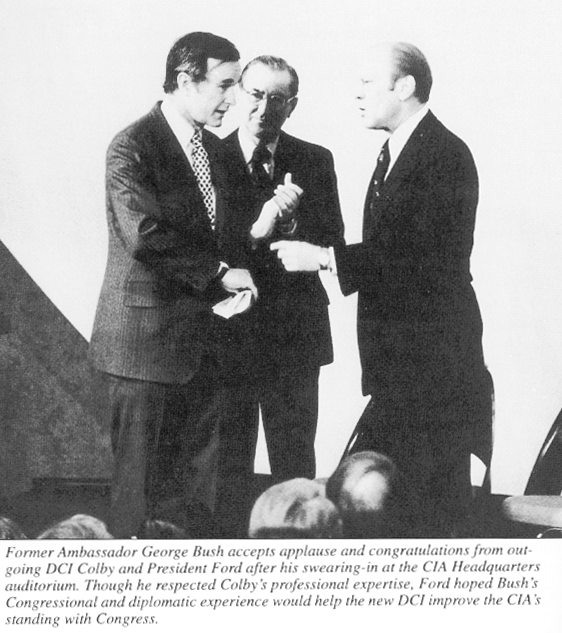
William Colby, outgoing Director of Central Intelligence, with President Ford and incoming DCI George Bush, 1975.

Then an OSS friend offered him a job at the Central Intelligence Agency (CIA), and he accepted. Colby spent the next 12 years in the field, first in Stockholm, Sweden. There he helped set up the stay-behind networks of Operation Gladio, a covert paramilitary organization organized by the CIA to make any Soviet occupation more difficult, as he later described in his memoirs.

Colby then spent much of the 1950s based in Rome under the cover of a State Department officer, where he led the Agency's covert political operations campaign to support anti-communist parties in their electoral contests against left wing Soviet–associated parties. The Christian Democrats and allied parties won several key elections in the 1950s, preventing a takeover by the Communist Party. Colby was a vocal advocate within the CIA and the United States government for engaging the non-Communist left wing parties in order to create broader non-Communist coalitions capable of governing fractious Italy. That position first brought him into conflict with James J. Angleton.

==== Southeast Asia ====
In 1959, Colby became the CIA's deputy chief and then chief of station in Saigon, South Vietnam, where he served until 1962. Tasked by the CIA with supporting the government of South Vietnamese President Ngô Đình Diệm, Colby established a relationship with Diem's family and with Ngô Đình Nhu, the president's brother, with whom Colby became close. While in Vietnam, Colby focused intensively on building up Vietnamese capabilities to combat the Viet Cong insurgency in the countryside. He argued that "the key to the war in Vietnam was the war in the villages." In 1962, he returned to Washington to become the deputy and then chief of the CIA's Far East Division, succeeding Desmond Fitzgerald, who had been tapped to lead the Agency's efforts against Fidel Castro's Cuba. During those years, Colby was deeply involved in Washington's policies in East Asia, particularly with respect to Vietnam, as well as Indonesia, Japan, Korea, and China. He was deeply critical of the decision to abandon support for Diem, and he believed that played a material part in the weakening of the South Vietnamese position in the following years.

In 1968, while Colby was preparing to take up the post of chief of the Soviet Bloc Division of the Agency, U.S. President Lyndon Johnson instead sent Colby back to Vietnam as deputy to Robert Komer, who had been charged with streamlining the civilian side of the American and South Vietnamese efforts against the Communists. Shortly after arriving Colby succeeded Komer as head of the U.S./South Vietnamese rural pacification effort named CORDS. Part of the effort was the controversial Phoenix Program, an initiative designed to identify and attack the "Viet Cong Infrastructure". There is considerable debate about the merits of the program, which was subject to allegations that it relied on or was complicit in assassination and torture. Colby consistently insisted that such tactics were not authorized by or permitted in the program. More broadly, along with Ambassador Ellsworth Bunker and Military Assistance Command, Vietnam (MACV) commander General Creighton Abrams, Colby was part of a leadership group that worked to apply a new approach to the war designed to focus more on pacification (winning hearts and minds) and securing the countryside, as opposed to the "search and destroy" approach that had characterized General William Westmoreland's tenure as MACV commander. Some, including Colby later in life, argue that approach succeeded in reducing the Communist insurgency in South Vietnam, but that South Vietnam, without air and ground support by the United States after the 1973 Paris Peace Accords, was ultimately overwhelmed by a conventional North Vietnamese assault in 1975. The CORDS model and its approach influenced U.S. strategy and thinking on counterinsurgency in the 2000s in Iraq and Afghanistan.

==== CIA HQ: Director ====
Colby returned to Washington in July 1971 and became executive director of CIA. After long-time DCI Richard Helms was dismissed by President Nixon in 1973, James Schlesinger assumed the helm at the Agency. A strong believer in reform of the CIA and the intelligence community more broadly, Schlesinger had written a 1971 Bureau of the Budget report outlining his views on the subject. Colby, who had had a somewhat unorthodox career in the CIA focused on political action and counterinsurgency, agreed with Schlesinger's reformist approach. Schlesinger appointed him head of the clandestine branch in early 1973. When Nixon reshuffled his agency heads and made Schlesinger secretary of defense, Colby emerged as a natural candidate for DCI, apparently on the basis of the recommendation that he was a professional who would not make waves. Colby was known as a media-friendly CIA director.

Colby's tenure as DCI, which lasted two-and-a-half tumultuous years, was overshadowed by the Church and Pike congressional investigations into alleged US intelligence malfeasance over the preceding 25 years, including 1975, the Year of Intelligence. His time as DCI was also eventful on the world stage. Shortly after he assumed leadership, the Yom Kippur War broke out, an event that surprised the American intelligence agencies but also those of Israel. The intelligence surprise reportedly affected Colby's credibility with the Nixon administration. Colby participated in the National Security Council meetings that responded to apparent Soviet intentions to intervene in the war by raising the alert level of U.S. forces to DEFCON 3 and defusing the crisis. In 1975, after many years of involvement, South Vietnam fell to Communist forces in April 1975, a particularly difficult blow for Colby, who had dedicated so much of his life and career to the American effort there. Events in the arms-control field, Angola, Australia, the Middle East, and elsewhere also demanded attention. He also focused on internal reforms within the CIA and the intelligence community. He attempted to modernize what he believed to be some out-of-date structures and practices by disbanding the Board of National Estimates and replacing it with the National Intelligence Council. In a speech from 1973 addressed to NSA employees, he emphasized the role of free speech in the U.S. and the moral role of CIA as a defender, not a preventer, of civil rights, an attempt to rebut the then emerging revelations of CIA and NSA domestic spying. He also mentioned a number of reforms intended to limit excessive classification of governmental information.

President Gerald Ford, advised by Henry Kissinger and others concerned by Colby's controversial openness to Congress and distance from the White House, replaced Colby late in 1975 with George H. W. Bush during the Halloween Massacre in which Secretary of Defense Schlesinger was also replaced (by Donald Rumsfeld). Colby was offered the position of United States Permanent Representative to NATO but turned it down.

=== Later career ===
In 1977 Colby founded a D.C. law firm, Colby, Miller & Hanes, with Marshall Miller, David Hanes, and associated lawyers, and worked on public policy issues. In consonance with his long-held liberal views, Colby became a supporter of the nuclear freeze and of reductions in military spending. He practiced law and advised various bodies on intelligence matters. During that period, he also wrote two books, both of which were memoirs of his professional life, combined with discussions of history and policy. One was titled Honorable Men: My Life in the CIA; the other, on Vietnam and his long involvement with American policy there, was called Lost Victory. In the latter book, Colby argued that the U.S.–South Vietnamese counterinsurgency campaign in Vietnam had succeeded by the early 1970s and that South Vietnam could have survived if the U.S. had continued to provide support after the Paris Accords. The topic remains open and controversial, but some recent scholarship, including by Lewis "Bob" Sorley, supports Colby's arguments.

Colby lent his expertise and knowledge, along with Oleg Kalugin, to the Activision game Spycraft: The Great Game, which was released shortly before his death. Both Colby and Kalugin played themselves in the game. Colby was a member of the National Coalition to Ban Handguns. His name appears on a note to Senator John Heinz dated July 5, 1989, as a "National Sponsor." At the time of the Senate hearings to confirm his appointment, Colby was relentlessly grilled about The Family Jewels, a secret 693-page report ordered by Schlesinger, directed by Colby, and compiled by CIA's own Inspector General's Office. It dealt with what Colby calls "some mistakes," specifically CIA abuses ranging from assassination plans to dosing people with mind-control drugs to domestic spying.

== Death ==
On April 27, 1996, Colby set out from his weekend home in Rock Point, Maryland, on a solo canoe trip. His canoe was found the following day on a sandbar in the Wicomico River, a tributary of the Potomac, about 0.25 miles (0.40 km) from his home. On May 6, Colby's body was found in a marshy riverbank lying face down not far from where his canoe was found. After an autopsy, Maryland's Chief Medical Examiner John E. Smialek ruled his death to be accidental. Smialek's report said that Colby was predisposed to having a heart attack or stroke from "severe calcified atherosclerosis" and that Colby likely "suffered a complication of this atherosclerosis which precipitated him into the cold water in a debilitated state and he succumbed to the effects of hypothermia and drowned."

External videos
- William Colby Memorial Service, National Cathedral, May 14, 1996, C-SPAN

Colby's death triggered conspiracy theories that his death had been caused by foul play. In his 2011 documentary The Man Nobody Knew, Colby's son Carl suggested that his father suffered from guilt over his failings as a father to one of his daughters and so committed suicide. Carl's step-mother and siblings, as well as Colby's biographer Randall Woods, criticized Carl's portrayal of Colby and rejected the allegation that the former CIA director killed himself and said that it was inconsistent with his character.

== Legacy ==
Colby was the subject of a biography, Lost Crusader, by John Prados, published in 2003. His son, Carl Colby, released a documentary on his father's professional and personal life, The Man Nobody Knew, in 2011. In May 2013, Randall B. Woods, Distinguished Professor of History at the J. William Fulbright School at the University of Arkansas, published his biography of Colby, titled Shadow Warrior: William Egan Colby and the CIA. Norwich University hosts an annual writers symposium named in his honor. His grandson, Elbridge Colby, served as Deputy Assistant Secretary of Defense for Strategy and Force Planning from 2017 to 2018 and is a co-founder of the Marathon Institute. He joined the second Trump administration as the Under Secretary of Defense for Policy in April 2025.

== Quotes ==
- "We disbanded our intelligence [after both world wars] and then found we needed it. Let's not go through that again. Redirect it, reduce the amount of money spent, but let's not destroy it. Because you don't know 10 years out what you're going to face."
- "The more we know about each other the safer we all are." — Colby to Leonid Brezhnev.
- On walking alone unfollowed through Red Square in 1989 during the end of the Cold War: "That was my victory parade."

== Bibliography ==
=== Memoirs ===
- —; Peter Forbath (1978). Honorable Men: My Life in the CIA. New York: Simon & Schuster. ISBN 978-0-671-22875-0.
- —; James McCargar (1989). Lost Victory: A Firsthand Account of America's Sixteen-Year Involvement in Vietnam. Chicago: Contemporary Books. ISBN 0-8092-4509-4. OCLC 20014837.

=== Speeches ===
- — (1975). Intelligence and the press: Address to the Associated Press annual meeting by William E. Colby on Monday, 7 April 1975. CIA.
- — (1975). Foreign intelligence for America: Address to the Commonwealth Club of California by William E. Colby on Wednesday, 7 May 1975 in San Francisco, California. CIA (1975).
- — (1975). Director of Central Intelligence press conference: CIA Headquarters auditorium, 19 November 1975. CIA.
- — (1986). The increased role of modern intelligence: A public speech on February 21, 1986 in Taipei. AWI lectures. Asia and World Institute.

== Sources ==
=== Biographies ===
- Colby, Carl (2011). Colby: A Secret Life of a CIA Spymaster. Annapolis, Md: Naval Institute. ISBN 9781591141228. OCLC 751577970.
- Ford, Harold P. (1993). William E. Colby as Director of Central Intelligence, 1973–1976. Washington, D.C.: Central Intelligence Agency. Declassified official CIA history of Colby's tenure, available at nsarchive.gwu.edu
- Prados, John (2009). William Colby and the CIA: The Secret Wars of a Controversial Spymaster. Lawrence: University Press of Kansas. ISBN 9780700616909. OCLC 320185462.
- Waller, Douglas C. (2015). Disciples: The World War II Spy Story of the Four OSS Men Who Later Led the CIA: Allen Dulles, Richard Helms, William Colby, William Casey. New York: Simon & Schuster. ISBN 9781451693720. OCLC 911179767.
- Woods, Randall B. (2013). Shadow Warrior: William Egan Colby and the CIA. Basic Books. ISBN 9780465021949. OCLC 812081249.

=== Other sources ===
- "William Colby: Retrospect". Central Intelligence Agency. May 8, 2007. Archived from the original on June 13, 2007. Evaluation of his tenure by CIA historian/official.
- Sorley, Lewis (1999). A Better War: The Unexamined Victories and Final Tragedy of America's Last Years in Vietnam. Harcourt. ISBN 0-15-100266-5.
- Garthoff, Douglas (2005). Directors of Central Intelligence as Leaders of the U.S. Intelligence Community, 1946–2005. Central Intelligence Agency. ISBN 1-929667-14-0.
- "Randall B. Woods: William E. Colby and the CIA". April 29, 2011. Archived from the original on July 20, 2011. Talk on Colby's legacy by University of Arkansas Cold War historian Randall Woods.
- Fallaci, Oriana (1977). Interview With History. Houghton Mifflin. ISBN 0-395-25223-7. Interview with William Colby

Government offices
Preceded by Thomas Karamessines	Deputy Director of Central Intelligence for Operations; 1973	Succeeded by William E. Nelson
Preceded by Vernon A. Walters; Acting	Director of Central Intelligence; 1973–1976	Succeeded by George H. W. Bush
