= 491st Bombardment Group =

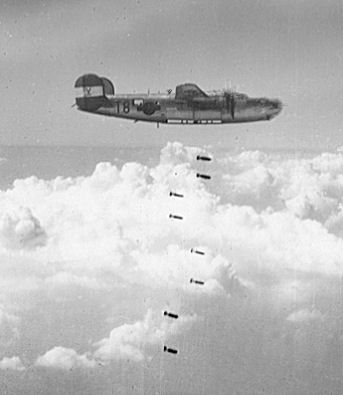
- 491st B-24 Liberator at bombs away (Note: Aircraft is Consolidated B-24J-55-CF Liberator, serial 44-10492 of the 853d Bomb Squadron.)
- Active: 1943–1945
- Country: United States
- Branch: United States Air Force
- Role: Bomber
- Part of: Eighth Air Force
- Nickname: Ringmasters
- Engagements: European Theater of Operations
- Decorations: Distinguished Unit Citation

Insignia
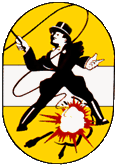
- 491st Bombardment Squadron emblem

The 491st Bombardment Group is a former United States Army Air Forces unit. It was activated in October 1943 as a heavy bomber unit, drawing its cadre from the former 17th Antisubmarine Squadron. After training in the United States, the group deployed to the European Theater of Operations, where it participated in the strategic bombing campaign against Germany, earning a Distinguished Unit Citation in an attack against Misburg. The group flew 187 combat missions. Following V-E Day, the group returned to the United States and was inactivated at McChord Field, Washington in September 1945.

== History ==
=== Training in the United States ===
The 491st Bombardment Group was activated 1 October 1943 at Davis–Monthan Field, Arizona, along with three of its component squadrons, the 852d, 853d, 854th and 855th Bombardment Squadrons. Its cadre was formed from the 17th Antisubmarine Squadron at Alamogordo Army Air Field, New Mexico, which was redesignated the 855th Bombardment Squadron and became the group's fourth squadron. (Note: A few enlisted members transferred from the 39th Bombardment Group as well.) In late October, the group commander and key personnel went to Pinecastle Army Air Field, Florida for special training with the Army Air Forces School of Applied Tactics, operating under simulated combat conditions. One crew was lost during this specialized training. The following month, the group and its squadrons moved to El Paso Army Air Field, Texas and began training with Consolidated B-24 Liberator heavy bombers. Most of the ground echelon of the group was withdrawn and reassigned to Boeing B-29 Superfortress units being organized by Second Air Force, with the largest portion moving to Pratt Army Air Field, Kansas. Many of the unit's remaining personnel were transferred to other B-24 groups as well, and by the end of December, the 491st had no assigned aircraft and only four crews in addition to the group staff.

In January, the air echelon moved to Pueblo Army Air Base, Colorado, where it was joined by new crews soon after arrival and continued training, reaching full strength in early February. Meanwhile, Eighth Air Force began organizing a new ground echelon for the group in England, directing each of the four groups assigned to its 2d Bombardment Division to form a squadron ground echelon. (Note: The four groups providing the ground echelon were the 93d 389th, 446th and 448th Bombardment Groups. Blue, p. 82.) The group's air echelon moved to Pueblo Army Air Base, Colorado to complete its training with the 471st Bombardment Group. Key personnel of the unit departed the United States on 11 April, while the crews began ferrying the squadron's B-24s via the southern ferry route on 21 April.

=== Combat in the European Theater of Operations ===
The 491st's air and ground echelons were assembled at RAF Metfield with the arrival of the air echelon by 15 May 1944, although the last plane of the 491st did not arrive until the 30th. It began operations starting on 2 June, with an attack on Bretigny Airfield. It initially attacked airfields, coastal defenses and lines of communication to support Operation Overlord, the invasion of France. After the D-Day landings, (Note: The squadron's assigned target was obscured by cloud cover and it returned to base without bombing. Blue, p. 85.) the squadron concentrated on the strategic bombing missions. Its targets included communications centers, oil refineries, shipyards, depots and other industrial targets. While targets included Berlin, Bielefeld, Cologne, Gelsenkirchen, Hamburg, Hanover, Kassel and Magdeburg. On one occasion, the squadron was tasked with attacking German General Staff headquarters at Zossen, south of Berlin.

In August 1944, the 492d Bombardment Group was taken off normal operations and moved on paper to replace the 801st Bombardment Group (Provisional) on Operation Carpetbagger operations. As a result, the 491st Group moved to the 492d's base at RAF North Pickenham. On 26 November 1944, the group raided an oil refinery at Misburg. It was attacked by large numbers of enemy interceptors, which shot down approximately half of the aircraft in the 491st Group formation. The remaining aircraft fought off the enemy planes and successfully bombed the target, earning the unit a Distinguished Unit Citation.

The group was occasionally diverted from the strategic bombing campaign. it supported ground forces during Operation Cobra the breakout at Saint Lo; dropped supplies to beleaguered paratroopers during Operation Market Garden, the attempt to seize a bridgehead across the Rhine River; and attacked supply lines and fortifications during the Battle of the Bulge. It supported Operation Varsity, the airborne assault across the Rhine and Allied forces driving across Germany. The squadron's final combat mission was flown on 25 April 1945.

=== Return to the United States and inactivation ===
During its combat tour, the 491st flew 187 missions, comprising over 5,000 sorties, the highest operational rate for Liberator units in Eighth Air Force. It lost 47 aircraft, (Note: Fifteen of these were lost on the Misburg raid. Freeman, p. 182.) while claiming 9 German planes destroyed. Following V-E Day, the group began flying its aircraft back to the United States on 17 June 1945. The ground echelon sailed on the RMS Queen Mary on 6 July, arriving in New York City five days later. The 491st reassembled at McChord Field, Washington later that month and was inactivated there on 8 September.

== Lineage ==
- Constituted as the 491st Bombardment Group, Heavy on 14 September 1943

Activated on 1 October 1943
Inactivated on 8 September 1945

=== Assignments ===
- II Bomber Command, 1 October 1943 – February 1944
- 95th Combat Bombardment Wing, c. 5 May 1944
- 14th Combat Bombardment Wing, 15 August 1944 – c. 17 July 1945
- Second Air Force, 17 July-8 September 1945

=== Components ===
- 852d Bombardment Squadron, 1 October 1943 – 8 September 1945
- 853d Bombardment Squadron, 1 October 1943 – 8 September 1945
- 854th Bombardment Squadron, 1 October 1943 – 8 September 1945
- 855th Bombardment Squadron, 1 October 1943 – 8 September 1945

=== Stations ===
- Davis–Monthan Field, Arizona, 1 October 1943
- El Paso Army Air Field, Texas, 11 November 1943 – 1 January 1944
- Ketteringham Hall (Sta 147), England (ground echelon), 1 January 1944
- RAF North Pickenham (Sta 143), England (ground echelon), March 1944 (Note: Ketteringham Hall and North Pickenham were apparently only nominal bases. Ketteringham Hall was station headquarters for the 2d Bombardment Division. Ground personnel for the 491st Group were actually located at the four stations of the division's groups. Although North Pickenham was selected to be the 491st Group's initial station in England, this choice was revoked and the squadron ground echelons did not move until April, when they gathered at Metfield. Freeman, p. 261.)
- Pueblo Army Air Base, Colorado, (air echelon) 1 January 1944
- RAF Metfield (Sta 366), England, c. 25 April 1944
- RAF North Pickenham (Sta 143), England, 15 August 1944 – 5 July 1945
- McChord Field, Washington, 17 July-8 September 1945

=== Aircraft ===
- Consolidated B-24 Liberator

=== Awards and campaigns ===
Award streamer	Award	Dates	Notes
	Distinguished Unit Citation	26 November 1944	Misburg, 491st Bombardment Group

Campaign Streamer	Campaign	Dates	Notes
	Air Offensive, Europe	25 April 1944 – 5 June 1944	491st Bombardment Group
	Air Combat, EAME Theater	25 April 1944 – 11 May 1945	491st Bombardment Group
	Normandy	6 June 1944 – 24 July 1944	491st Bombardment Group
	Northern France	25 July 1944 – 14 September 1944	491st Bombardment Group
	Rhineland	15 September 1944 – 21 March 1945	491st Bombardment Group
	Ardennes-Alsace	16 December 1944 – 25 January 1945	491st Bombardment Group
	Central Europe	22 March 1944 – 21 May 1945	491st Bombardment Group

== See also ==
- B-24 Liberator units of the United States Army Air Forces
