= 852nd Bombardment Squadron =

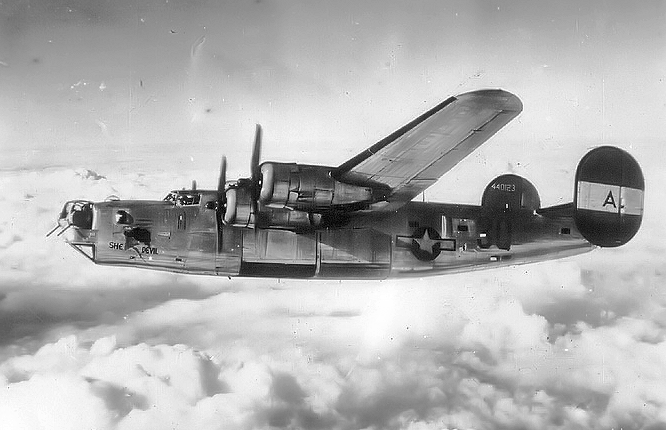
- 852nd Squadron B-24 Liberator (Note: Aircraft is Consolidated B-24D-30-CO Liberator, serial 42-40123, She Devil in 1944.)
- Active: 1943–1945
- Country: United States
- Branch: United States Air Force
- Role: Heavy bomber
- Engagements: European Theater of Operations
- Decorations: Distinguished Unit Citation

Insignia
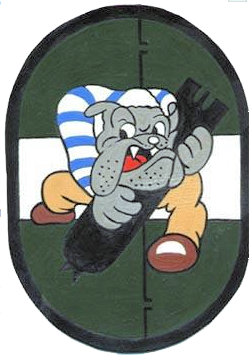
- 852nd Bombardment Squadron emblem
- Fuselage code: 3Q

The 852nd Bombardment Squadron is a former United States Army Air Forces unit. It was activated in October 1943 as a heavy bomber unit. After training in the United States, the squadron deployed to the European Theater of Operations, where it participated in the strategic bombing campaign against Germany, earning a Distinguished Unit Citation in an attack against Misburg. Following V-E Day, the squadron returned to the United States and was inactivated at McChord Field, Washington in September 1945.

== History ==
=== Training in the United States ===
The 852nd Bombardment Squadron was activated 1 October 1943 at Davis-Monthan Field, Arizona as one of the four squadrons of the 491st Bombardment Group. The following month, the squadron moved to El Paso Army Air Field, Texas and began training with Consolidated B-24 Liberator heavy bombers. In January, most of the ground echelon of the squadron was withdrawn and reassigned to Boeing B-29 Superfortress units being organized by Second Air Force, with the largest group moving to Pratt Army Air Field, Kansas. Many of the unit's remaining personnel were transferred to other B-24 groups as well, and by the end of December, the squadron had no assigned aircraft. While the air echelon continued training in the United States, Eighth Air Force began organizing a new ground echelon in England, directing each of the four groups assigned to its 2d Bombardment Division to form a squadron ground echelon. (Note: The four groups providing the ground echelon were the 93rd 389th, 446th and 448th Bombardment Groups. Blue, p. 82.) The air echelon moved to Pueblo Army Air Base, Colorado to complete its training with the 471st Bombardment Group. Key personnel of the unit departed the United States on 11 April, while the crews began ferrying the squadron's B-24s via the southern ferry route on 21 April.

=== Combat in Europe ===
The squadron was assembled at RAF Metfield with the arrival of the air echelon by 15 May 1944, although the last plane of the 491st Group did not arrive until the 30th. It began operations starting on 2 June, with an attack on Bretigny Airfield. It initially attacked airfields, coastal defenses and lines of communication to support Operation Overlord, the invasion of France. After the D-Day landings, (Note: The squadron's assigned target was obscured by cloud cover and it returned to base without bombing. Blue, p. 85.) the squadron concentrated on the strategic bombing missions. Its targets included communications centers, oil refineries, shipyards, depots and other industrial targets. Its targets included Berlin, Bielefeld, Cologne, Gelsenkirchen, Hamburg, Hanover, Kassel and Magdeburg. On one occasion, the squadron was tasked with attacking German General Staff headquarters at Zossen, south of Berlin.

In August 1944, the 492nd Bombardment Group was taken off normal operations and moved on paper to replace the 801st Bombardment Group (Provisional) on Operation Carpetbagger operations. As a result, the 491st Group, including the squadron, moved to the 492nd's base at RAF North Pickenham. On 26 November 1944, the group raided an oil refinery at Misburg. It was attacked by large numbers of enemy interceptors, which shot down approximately half of the aircraft in the 491st Group formation. The remaining aircraft fought off the enemy planes and successfully bombed the target, earning the unit a Distinguished Unit Citation.

The squadron was occasionally diverted from the strategic bombing campaign. It supported ground forces during Operation Cobra, the breakout at Saint Lo; it dropped supplies to beleaguered paratroopers during Operation Market Garden, the attempt to seize a bridgehead across the Rhine River; and it attacked supply lines and fortifications during the Battle of the Bulge. The squadron supported Operation Varsity, the airborne assault across the Rhine and Allied forces driving across Germany. The squadron's final combat mission was flown on 25 April 1945.

Following V-E Day, the squadron began flying its aircraft back to the United States on 17 June 1945. The ground echelon sailed on the RMS Queen Mary on 6 July, arriving in New York City five days later. The squadron reassembled at McChord Field, Washington later that month and was inactivated there on 8 September.

== Lineage ==
- Constituted as the 852nd Bombardment Squadron, Heavy on 14 September 1943

Activated on 1 October 1943
Inactivated on 8 September 1945

=== Assignments ===
- 491st Bombardment Group, 1 October 1943 – 8 September 1945

=== Stations ===
- Davis-Monthan Field, Arizona, 1 October 1943
- El Paso Army Air Field, Texas, 11 November 1943 – 1 January 1944
- Ketteringham Hall (Sta 147), England (ground echelon), 1 January 1944
- RAF North Pickenham (Sta 143), England (ground echelon), March 1944 (Note: Ketteringham Hall and North Pickenham were apparently only nominal bases. Ketteringham Hall was station headquarters for the 2nd Bombardment Division. Ground personnel for the 491st Group were actually located at the four stations of the division's groups. Although North Pickenham was selected to be the 491st Group's initial station in England, this choice was revoked and the squadron ground echelons did not move until April, when they gathered at Metfield. Freeman, p. 261.)
- Pueblo Army Air Base, Colorado, (air echelon) 1 January 1944
- RAF Metfield (Sta 366), England, c. 25 April 1944
- RAF North Pickenham (Sta 143), England, 15 August 1944 – 5 July 1945
- McChord Field, Washington, 17 July – 8 September 1945

=== Aircraft ===
- Consolidated B-24 Liberator, 1943–1945

=== Awards and campaigns ===
Award streamer	Award	Dates	Notes
	Distinguished Unit Citation	26 November 1944	Misburg

Campaign Streamer	Campaign	Dates	Notes
	Air Offensive, Europe	25 April 1944 – 5 June 1944	
	Air Combat, EAME Theater	25 April 1944 – 11 May 1945	
	Normandy	6 June 1944 – 24 July 1944	
	Northern France	25 July 1944 – 14 September 1944	
	Rhineland	15 September 1944 – 21 March 1945	
	Ardennes-Alsace	16 December 1944 – 25 January 1945	
	Central Europe	22 March 1944 – 21 May 1945	

== See also ==
- B-24 Liberator units of the United States Army Air Forces
