= 855th Bombardment Squadron =

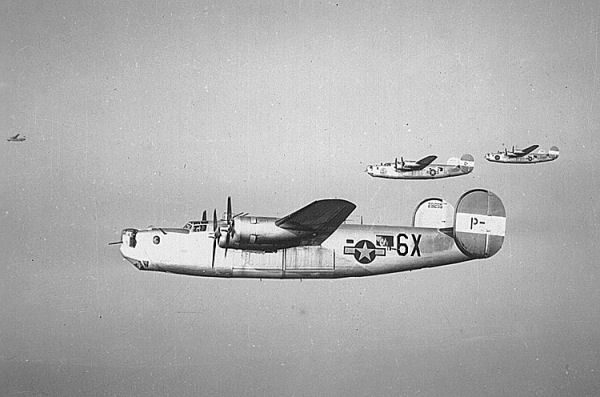
- Formation of 491st Group B-24 Liberators (Note: The aircraft in the foreground is Ford Motors built Consolidated B-24H-25-FO Liberator, serial 42-95255, 6X*P-.)
- Active: 1942-1945
- Country: United States
- Branch: United States Air Force
- Role: Heavy bomber
- Engagements: European Theater of Operations
- Decorations: Distinguished Unit Citation

Insignia
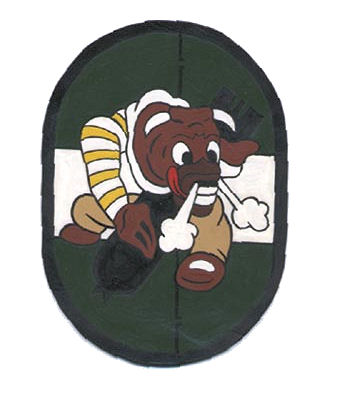
- 855th Bombardment Squadron emblem
- European Theater fuselage code: V2

The 855th Bombardment Squadron is an inactive United States Air Force unit. The squadron was first activated as the 522d Bombardment Squadron at Lantana Airport, Florida, in October 1942, when it assumed the personnel and equipment of a National Guard unit engaged in antisubmarine warfare over the Atlantic. The squadron continued antisubmarine patrols as the 17th Antisubmarine Squadron until the summer of 1943, when its mission was transferred to the Navy.

The squadron moved to Alamogordo Army Air Field, Arizona, where, as the 855th Bombardment Squadron, it formed the cadre for the 491st Bombardment Group, although many of its personnel were subsequently assigned to new Boeing B-29 Superfortress units. After training as a heavy bomber unit in the United States, the air echelon squadron deployed to the European Theater of Operations, where it joined a new ground echelon and participated in the strategic bombing campaign against Germany, earning a Distinguished Unit Citation in an attack against Misburg. Following V-E Day, the squadron returned to the United States and was inactivated at McChord Field, Washington on 8 September 1945.

== History ==
=== Organization and antisubmarine warfare ===
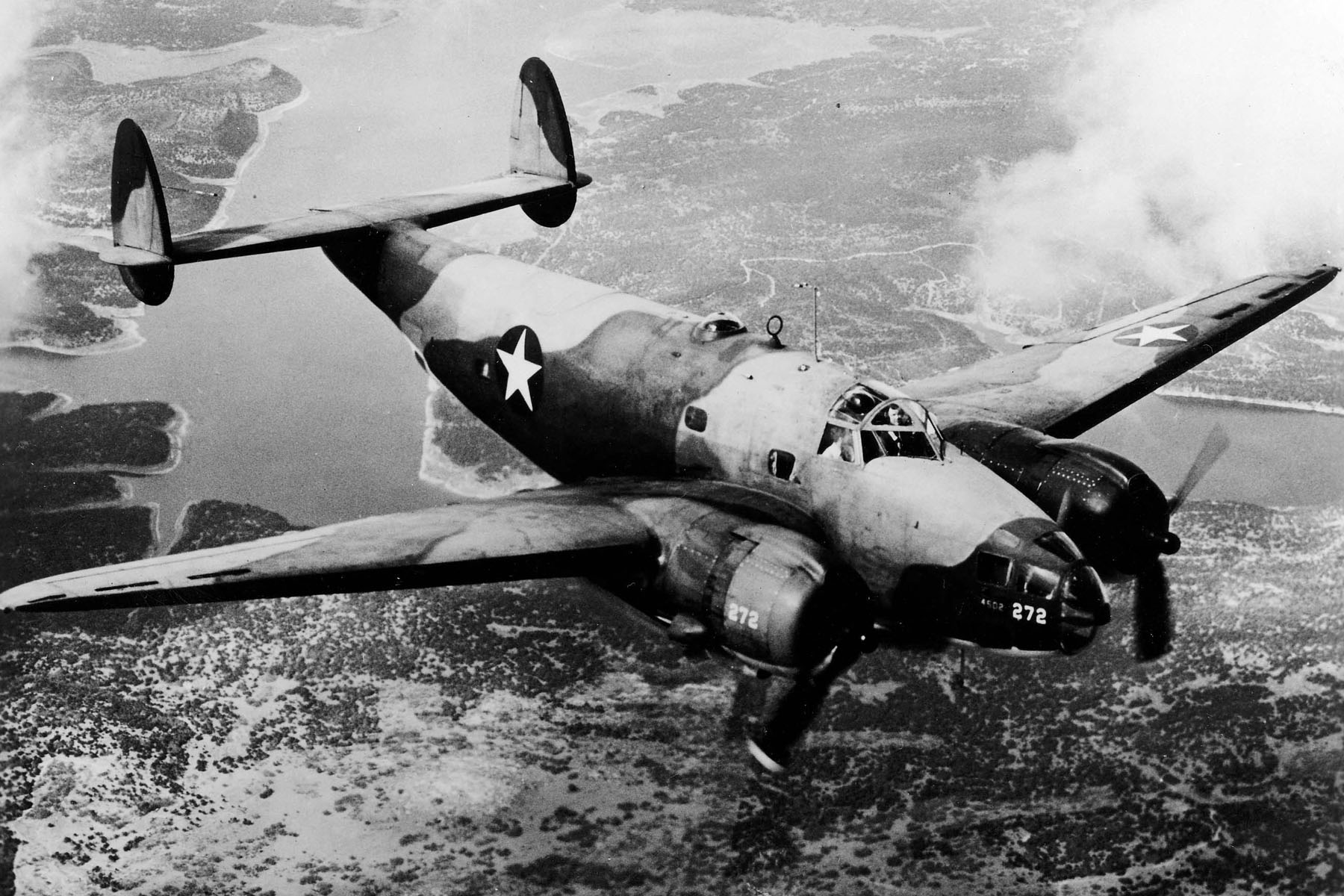
Lockheed B-34 in flight

The squadron was first activated at Lantana Airport, Florida in October 1942 as the 522nd Bombardment Squadron, where it took over the antisubmarine warfare mission, personnel and equipment of the 112th Observation Squadron, a federalized Ohio National Guard unit that had been mobilized in 1940, and which was simultaneously inactivated. It was briefly assigned directly to Army Air Forces Antisubmarine Command, but soon became part of the 378th Bombardment Group, whose headquarters were located at Langley Field, Virginia, but had squadrons dispersed along the southern Atlantic coast. The squadron was equipped with a mix of Douglas B-18 Bolos, Lockheed B-34s and North American B-25 Mitchells. The squadron mission was to search for German U-boats off the southeast Atlantic coast. Although the Navy was responsible for long range antisubmarine patrolling, it lacked the aircraft to perform the mission and the Army Air Forces (AAF) performed the mission, even though its crews lacked proper training.

In November 1942, Army Air Forces Antisubmarine Command had established the 26th Antisubmarine Wing to control its forces operating over the Gulf of Mexico and Caribbean Sea. Its bombardment group headquarters, including the 378th, were inactivated and the squadron, redesignated the 17th Antisubmarine Squadron in November, was assigned directly to the 26th Wing in December. The squadron continued its mission from Boca Chica Field, Florida in January 1943. In July 1943, the AAF and Navy reached an agreement to transfer the coastal antisubmarine mission to the Navy. This mission transfer also included an exchange of AAF long-range bombers equipped for antisubmarine warfare for Navy Consolidated B-24 Liberators without such equipment.

=== Retraining and reorganization ===
The squadron moved to Alamogordo Army Air Field, New Mexico in late September 1943 and was redesignated the 855th Bombardment Squadron. On 1 October 1943 it formed the cadre for the 491st Bombardment Group, which was activated at Davis-Monthan Field, Arizona. The following month, the squadron moved to El Paso Army Air Field, Texas and began training with Consolidated B-24 Liberator heavy bombers. In January, most of the ground echelon of the squadron was withdrawn and reassigned to Boeing B-29 Superfortress units being organized by Second Air Force, with the largest group moving to Pratt Army Air Field, Kansas. Many of the unit's remaining personnel were transferred to other B-24 groups as well, and by the end of December, the squadron had no assigned aircraft. While the air echelon continued training in the United States, Eighth Air Force began organizing a new ground echelon in England, directing each of the four groups assigned to its 2d Bombardment Division to form a squadron ground echelon. (Note: The four groups providing the ground echelon were the 93d 389th, 446th and 448th Bombardment Groups. Blue, p. 82.) The air echelon moved to Pueblo Army Air Base, Colorado to complete its training with the 471st Bombardment Group. Key personnel of the unit departed the United States on 11 April, while the crews began ferrying the squadron's B-24s via the southern ferry route on 21 April.

=== Combat in the European Theater ===
The squadron was assembled at RAF Metfield with the arrival of the air echelon by 15 May 1944, although the last plane of the 491st Group did not arrive until the 30th. It began operations starting on 2 June, with an attack on Bretigny Airfield. It initially attacked airfields, coastal defenses and lines of communication to support Operation Overlord, the invasion of France. After the D-Day landings, (Note: The squadron's assigned target was obscured by cloud cover and it returned to base without bombing. Blue, p. 85.) the squadron concentrated on the strategic bombing missions. Its targets included communications centers, oil refineries, shipyards, depots and other industrial targets. While targets included Berlin, Bielefeld, Cologne, Gelsenkirchen, Hamburg, Hanover, Kassel and Magdeburg. On one occasion, the squadron was tasked with attacking German General Staff headquarters at Zossen, south of Berlin.

In August 1944, the 492d Bombardment Group was taken off normal operations and moved on paper to replace the 801st Bombardment Group (Provisional) on Operation Carpetbagger operations. As a result, the 491st group, including the squadron, moved to the 492d's base at RAF North Pickenham. On 26 November 1944, the group raided an oil refinery at Misburg. It was attacked by large numbers of enemy interceptors, which shot down approximately half of the aircraft in the 491st Group formation. The remaining aircraft fought off the enemy planes and successfully bombed the target, earning the unit a Distinguished Unit Citation.

The squadron was occasionally diverted from the strategic bombing campaign: It supported ground forces during Operation Cobra, the breakout at Saint Lo; dropped supplies to beleaguered paratroopers during Operation Market Garden, the attempt to seize a bridgehead across the Rhine River; and attacked supply lines and fortifications during the Battle of the Bulge. It supported Operation Varsity, the airborne assault across the Rhine and Allied forces driving across Germany. The squadron's final combat mission was flown on 25 April 1945.

Following V-E Day, the squadron began flying its aircraft back to the United States on 17 June 1945. The ground echelon sailed on the RMS Queen Mary on 6 July, arriving in New York City five days later. The squadron reassembled at McChord Field, Washington later that month and was inactivated there on 8 September.

== Lineage ==
- Constituted as the 522d Bombardment Squadron (Heavy) on 13 October 1942

Activated on 18 October 1942
Redesignated 17th Antisubmarine Squadron (Heavy) on 29 November 1942
Redesignated 17th Antisubmarine Squadron (Medium) on 3 March 1943
Redesignated 17th Antisubmarine Squadron (Heavy) on 20 April 1943
Redesignated 855th Bombardment Squadron (Heavy) on 24 September 1943
Redesignated 855th Bombardment Squadron, Heavy c. 1944
Inactivated on 8 September 1945

=== Assignments ===
- Army Air Forces Antisubmarine Command, 18 October 1942
- 378th Bombardment Group, 20 November 1942
- 26th Antisubmarine Wing, 14 December 1942
- 491st Bombardment Group, 1 October 1943 – 8 September 1945

=== Stations ===
- Lantana Airport, Florida, 18 October 1942
- Boca Chica Field, Florida, 9 January 1943
- Miami Army Air Field, Florida, 3 July 1943
- Alamogordo Army Air Field, New Mexico, 24 September 1943
- El Paso Army Air Field, Texas, 11 November 1943 – 1 February 1944
- RAF North Pickenham (Station 143), England, February 1944
- RAF Metfeld (Station 366), England, April 1944
- RAF North Pickenham (Station 143), England, 15 August 1944 – 5 July 1945
- McChord Field, Washington, 17 July – 8 September 1945

=== Aircraft ===
- Douglas B-18 Bolo, 1942-1943
- North American B-25 Mitchell, 1942-1943
- Lockheed B-34 Ventura, 1942-1943
- Consolidated B-24 Liberator, 1943-1945

=== Awards and campaigns ===
Award streamer	Award	Dates	Notes
	Distinguished Unit Citation	26 November 1944	Misburg, 855th Bombardment Squadron

Campaign Streamer	Campaign	Dates	Notes
	Antisubmarine	7 December 1941 – 1 August 1943	522d Bombardment Squadron (later 17th Antisubmarine Squadron)
	Air Offensive, Europe	25 April 1944 – 5 June 1944	855th Bombardment Squadron
	Air Combat, EAME Theater	25 April 1944 – 11 May 1945	855th Bombardment Squadron
	Normandy	6 June 1944 – 24 July 1944	855th Bombardment Squadron
	Northern France	25 July 1944 – 14 September 1944	855th Bombardment Squadron
	Rhineland	15 September 1944 – 21 March 1945	855th Bombardment Squadron
	Ardennes-Alsace	16 December 1944 – 25 January 1945	855th Bombardment Squadron
	Central Europe	22 March 1944 – 21 May 1945	855th Bombardment Squadron
