= John Prince Memorial Park =

Park in Florida, United States

- Interactive map of John Prince Memorial Park
- Type: Urban park
- Location: Lake Worth Beach, Florida, United States
- Coordinates: 26°36′15.59″N 80°05′20.52″W
- Area: 726.36 acres (293.95 ha)
- Created: 1930s
- Operator: Palm Beach County Parks and Recreation Department
- Status: Open all year

John Prince Memorial Park is a park located in Lake Worth Beach, Florida. The park covers 726.36 acres (338 of which are acres of Lake Osborne) and is managed by the Palm Beach County Parks and Recreation Department. Most of the park is on the western and northern shore of Lake Osborne. Some of the facilities at the park include: a new five section dog park called Lake Woof, pavilions, park ground structures, tennis courts, basketball courts, volleyball courts, boat/canoe/kayak launch, outdoor fitness center, and a campground. The park is located adjacent to the Lantana Airport.

The park is named after former county commissioner John Prince who served for 18 years. Mr. Prince got developers and the state to donate more than 1,000 acres (4.0 km^{2}) of land in the 1930s and 1940s which became the park, Palm Beach State College's Lake Worth campus, and the Lantana Airport.

John Prince Park is believed to be the second oldest county park in Florida.

== History ==
The land which later encompassed John Prince Memorial Park was originally an extensive wetland and lake system on the western periphery of the Atlantic Coastal Ridge. John Prince – a Palm Beach County commissioner who served from 1934 to 1948 – began lobbying in the mid-1930s for acquisition of the undeveloped land on the western shore of Lake Osborne. Prince successfully persuaded his colleagues. After Governor Fred P. Cone told him that much of the land was in private ownership, Prince convinced each owner to sell their property. The county then began working on converting the wetlands into a county park, de-mucking and filling the land by dredging around Lake Osborne. Only about 6 acres (0.024 km^{2}) of wetlands remain at the park today. A portion of the land was set aside for building the Palm Beach County Park Airport, which opened in 1941. Additional land was donated for the construction of a Boy Scout Camp and a Girl Scout Camp. Known as Lake Osborne Park in its early days, the park was renamed John Prince Memorial Park after Prince died in June 1952.

Approximately 200 people attended the official dedication ceremony held on November 11, 1952, including state senator Russell O. Morrow, Greenacres City mayor Earl Rasor, Lake Worth mayor M. C. Baker, Palm Beach mayor James M. Owens Jr., and West Palm Beach mayor H. Elmo Robinson. In the mid-1950s, the county donated 114 acres (0.46 km^{2}) of land in the northwest corner of the park to Palm Beach Junior College (now known as Palm Beach State College) for construction of a permanent campus, which opened in 1956. The South Florida Fair (then known as the Palm Beach County Fair) was held at the park in 1957, one year before moving to its current location at the former site of the Palm Beach Speedway. A total of 101,891 people attended the event, then a record number for the annual fair and an increase of approximately 10% from the previous year. As the area around Lake Osborne was de-mucked and filled and water level of the lake itself lowered from 15 ft (4.6 m) to 9 ft (2.7 m), the dominant vegetation transitioned from wetland-type plants, such as cattail and sawgrass, to willows by the mid-1980s.

== Campground ==
John Prince Memorial Park has a 48-acre (0.19 km^{2}) campground, out of the park's total 726 acres (2.94 km^{2}), which features 352 sites for tents or RVs. The campground was founded in 1956 after the Gulf Stream Council (the local council of Boy Scouts of America) donated Camp Osborne to Palm Beach County, one year before the establishment of Tanah Keeta Scout Reservation near Jonathan Dickinson State Park. Consequently, a small section of the John Prince Memorial Park campground is still sometimes referred to as Scout Hill.
