= Palm Beach County Park Airport =

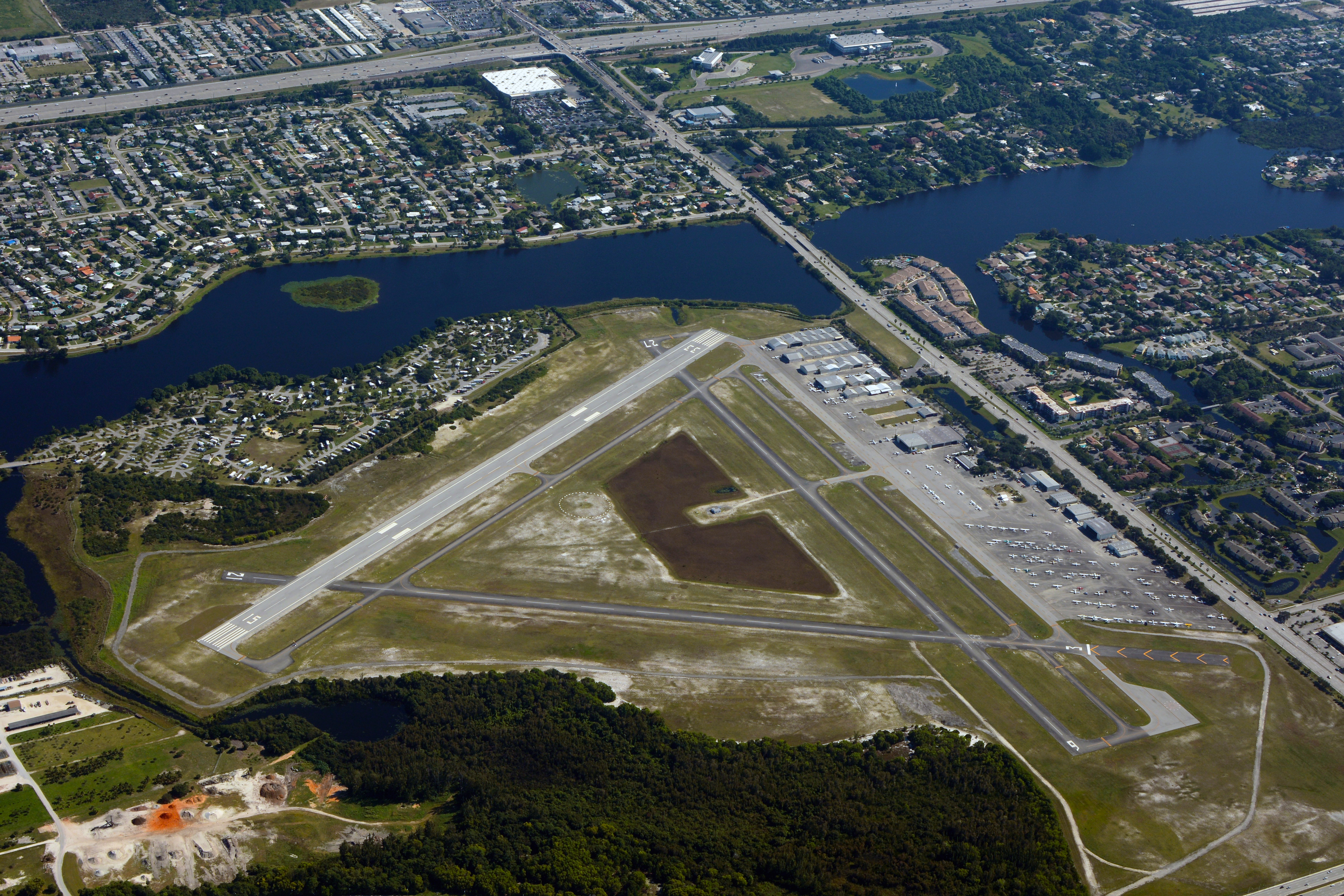
- IATA: LNA; ICAO: KLNA; FAA LID: LNA

Summary
- Airport type: Public
- Owner: Palm Beach County
- Serves: West Palm Beach, Florida
- Elevation AMSL: 14 ft / 4 m
- Coordinates: 26°35′35″N 080°05′06″W

Map
- Interactive map of Palm Beach County Park Airport

Runways
Direction	Length		Surface
Direction	ft	m	Surface
4/22	3,256	992	Asphalt
10/28	3,489	1,063	Asphalt
16/34	3,421	1,043	Asphalt

Statistics (2010)
- Aircraft operations: 122,270
- Based aircraft: 257
- Source: Federal Aviation Administration

Palm Beach County Park Airport (IATA: LNA, ICAO: KLNA, FAA LID: LNA) is a county-owned, public-use airport in Palm Beach County, Florida, United States. It is located six nautical miles (7 mi, 11 km) south of the central business district of West Palm Beach, Florida. This airport is included in the National Plan of Integrated Airport Systems for 2011–2015, which categorized it as a reliever airport. It is also commonly referred to as the Lantana Airport.

== History ==
=== 1940s ===
The land the airport was to be built on was donated to Palm Beach County by philanthropic-minded families under the condition that the land be dedicated to serving the public. Recognizing the growing presence of aircraft in Florida and realizing that the number of aircraft would soon overwhelm local fields, the county decided to build an airport on the land. Prior to the United States entry into World War II, the Office of Civilian Defense was responsible for preparing for threats to the United States. They determined that this location would be an ideal location for planes conducting off-shore patrols for Axis submarines that had been moving along the Florida coast.

The U.S. government reached an agreement with the County whereby the county would dredge and prepare the land and the U.S. government would build the airfield. The airfield was built with a parallel taxiway and ample ramp space.

The first plane to land on the field was on August 20, 1941. On December 1, 1941, the Civil Air Patrol was formed and Lantana was one of three airfields chosen to host a unit, Coastal Patrol Base 3. In addition, the Army Air Forces Antisubmarine Command stationed the 17th Antisubmarine Squadron at the airport during the early months of the war. The 17th AS flew overflights of the Florida coast as well as over the Gulf of Mexico and the Florida Straits patrolling for U-boats until January 1943 when the unit moved to Key West. When the Army Air Forces left, the CAP unit was transferred from Morrison Field (later to become Palm Beach International Airport) to Lantana for the remainder of the War.

=== 1950s ===
The Civil Air Patrol continued to use Lantana throughout the 1950s and the field served as the Group 5 Headquarters. A Search Unit for the United States Customs Service was also based at the field. Through World War II, the War Department had leased exclusive use of the field. Following the cessation of hostilities, the field transitioned to civilian use. A flight school was opened at the field while the number of civilian flights grew to 115,000 per year. On one occasion over 20 DC-3s and 36 Beechcraft Model 18 aircraft were counted.

=== 1960s ===
The 1960s saw a decline in usage at the airport from its heyday in the 50s. The county was reluctant to enter into long-term leases with fixed-base operators and by 1964, only one remained at the airport. In the meantime, Palm Beach International was opened to all general aviation and Boca Raton Airport became operational, accepting aircraft that formerly used Lantana.

In early 1969, a VOR system was installed at the airport.

=== 1970s ===
With an increasing number of executive jets using the airport from the late 60s into the 70s, local residents pushed the county into passing a noise ordinance banning jet aircraft from the airport. The airport was degrading with aging facilities in need of repair and upgrade. In an effort to remain competitive, the county applied for and received federal aid for ramp and infrastructure improvements, including landscaping.

A VASI system was installed on runways 10/28 and 16/34 in 1973.

=== 1980s ===
The airport was expanded in the 80s with the air right-of-way for runway 10 being contributed by aviation enthusiasts and the right-of-way for runway 28 obtained through court action. A roadblock to the airport being designated as a reliever airport was the volume of water supply to the airport. It was determined to be insufficient to meet Fire Department needs in the event of an air crash at the airport. Operations remained flat at the airport despite a 60% increase in tied-down aircraft.

=== 1990s ===
With the improved facilities, a number of businesses moved into the airport. Two air-charter operations were based at the field and a glider company operated from the field from Thanksgiving through Memorial Day. The field was also the only field between Stuart and Fort Lauderdale to allow banner towing advertising business. The airport had functioned as a jump-off point for flights into the Caribbean, particularly The Bahamas, and the Turks and Caicos Islands. The increase of drug-trafficking curtailed Caribbean flights starting the mid-90s.

On June 23, 1996, the flight crew of a Carnival Airlines Boeing 727 mistook Palm Beach County Airport for Palm Beach International Airport which is about five miles to the north of Palm Beach County and also has a major east–west runway. The landing gear of the 727 were already down when an Air Traffic Controller alerted the Captain that they were on approach to the wrong airport.

=== 2010s ===
After the inauguration of U.S. president Donald Trump in January 2017 and his visits to nearby Mar-a-Lago, the airport indicated that due to the security restriction it had to shut down three weekends in February 2017. This affected its operations and the business of about two dozen affiliated businesses. A banner flying company indicated loss of contracts of $40,000 after three closings and a helicopter company relocated at an estimated financial loss of $440,000 per year.

== Facilities and aircraft ==
Palm Beach County Park Airport covers an area of 304 acres (123 ha) at an elevation of 14 feet (4.3 m) above mean sea level. It has three runways laid out in a triangle, all of which have an asphalt surface and a PAPI system: Runway 4/22 is 3,256 by 75 feet (992 by 23 m); Runway 16/34 is 3,421 by 100 feet (1,043 by 30 m); Runway 10/28 is 3,489 by 75 feet (1,063 by 23 m).

The airport does not have a control tower. The maximum aircraft weight for Lantana is 12,500 pounds (5,700 kg) although the runways are rated for 30,000 pounds (14,000 kg) per wheel. Local ordinances also prohibit jet aircraft from using the field.

For the 12-month period ending May 21, 2010, the airport had 122,270 aircraft operations, an average of 334 per day: 99% general aviation and 1% air taxi. At that time there were 257 aircraft based at this airport: 71% single-engine, 18% multi-engine, <1% jet, 9% helicopter, and 1% glider.

The airport has one fixed-base operator, Stellar Aviation. Three flight training schools are also located at the airport- Aamro Aviation, Palm Beach Flight Training and Skywalker Aviation. The Palm Beach County Park Airport is owned by Palm Beach County and operated by the Palm Beach County Airport Department. The airport is on the west side of Lake Osborne.

== See also ==
- List of airports in Florida
