= RAF Metfield =

Former Royal Air Force station in Suffolk, England

RAF Metfield USAAF Station 366
- Located near Metfield, Suffolk, England
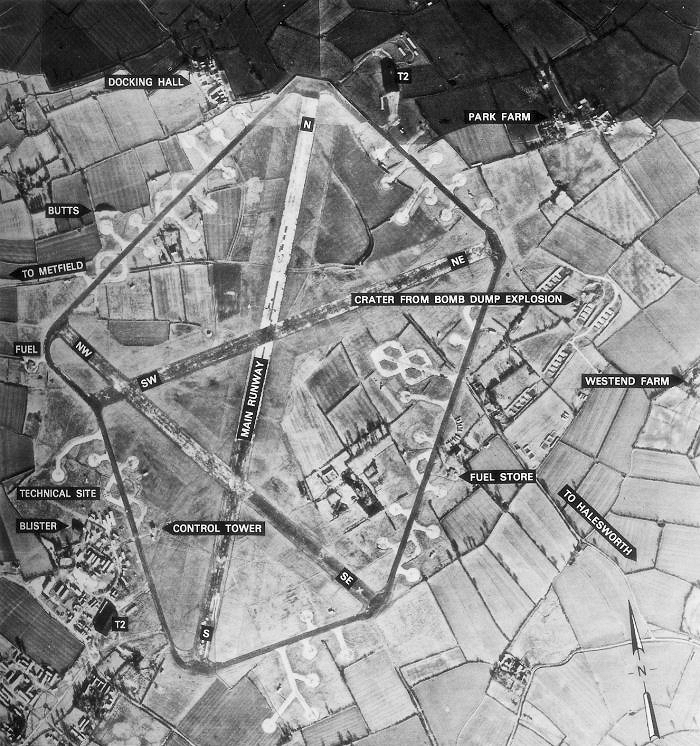
- RAF Metfield - January 1947

Site information
- Type: Royal Air Force station
- Owner: Air Ministry
- Controlled by: Royal Air Force; United States Army Air Forces

Location
- Location in Suffolk
- Coordinates: 52.367°N 1.396°E

Site history
- Built: 1943
- In use: 1943-1945
- Battles/wars: European theatre of World War II; Air Offensive, Europe July 1942 - May 1945

Garrison information
- Garrison: Eighth Air Force
- Occupants: 353d Fighter Group; 491st Bombardment Group

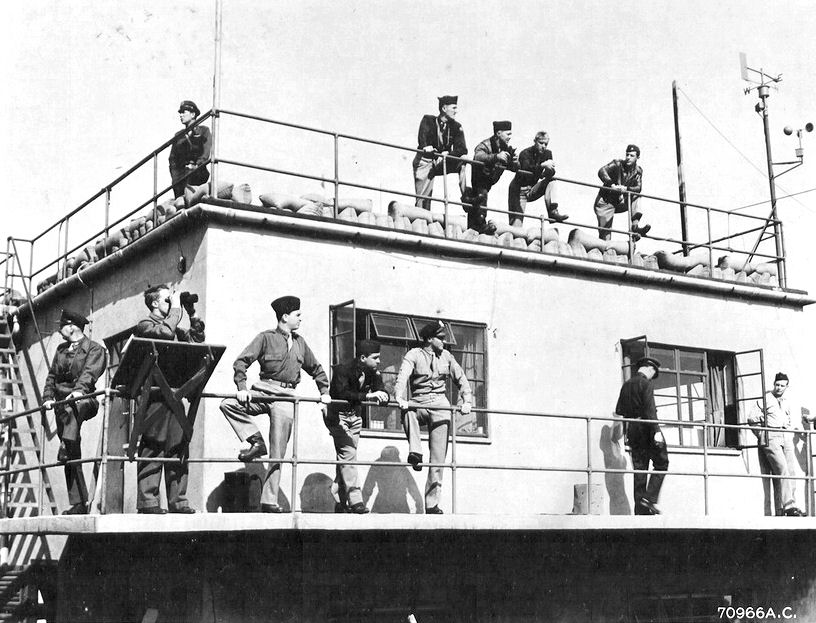
The control tower at RAF Metfield, on 30 May 1944, AAF personnel waiting for returning aircraft.

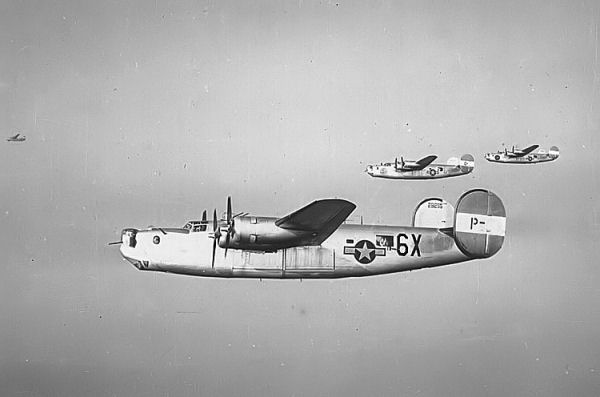
Ford B-24H-25-FO Liberator Serial 42-95219 of the 854th Bomb Squadron

Royal Air Force Metfield or more simply RAF Metfield is a former Royal Air Force station located just to the southeast of the village of Metfield, Suffolk, England.

Metfield was built as a standard, Class-A bomber design airfield, consisting of three intersecting concrete runways, fifty dispersal points and two T-2 type hangars. Additional buildings were also erected to house about 2,900 personnel on former farmland to the southwest. When it was constructed in 1943, it necessitated the closure of the B1123 road between Halesworth and Harleston.

== History ==
=== USAAF use ===
The airfield was built for the United States Army Air Forces (USAAF) Eighth Air Force as a heavy bomber field. During the Second World War it was known as USAAF Station 366. Metfield was one of the most isolated Eighth Air Force stations in Suffolk.

==== 353rd Fighter Group ====
The first American occupants of Metfield was the 353rd Fighter Group, moving in from RAF Goxhill on 3 August 1943. The 353rd was assigned to the 66th Fighter Wing, at Sawston Hall, Cambridge.

Operational squadrons of the 353d were:

- 350th Fighter Squadron (LH)
- 351st Fighter Squadron (YJ)
- 352nd Fighter Squadron (SX)

Group markings were black, yellow, black, yellow spinners, with a 48-inch black and yellow check band around the cowling to the end of the exhaust stubs.

Equipped with Republic P-47D Thunderbolts, operations commenced on 12 August 1943. It was the fourth P-47 unit to join the Eighth Air Force. From Metfield the 353rd flew numerous counter-air missions and provided escort for bombers that attacked targets in western Europe, made counter-air sweeps over France and the Low Countries, and dive-bombed targets in France.

On 12 April 1944 the 353rd moved to RAF Raydon.

==== 491st Bombardment Group (Heavy) ====
With the departure of the P-47's of the 353d, a Consolidated B-24 Liberators bombardment group, the 491st Bombardment Group (Heavy) moved in. The 491st starting arriving on 15 May and the last aircraft arrived on 30 May 1944.

The 491st was assigned to the 95th Combat Wing at RAF Halesworth. The group tail code was a Circle "Z". Its operational squadrons were:

- 852nd Bombardment Squadron (3Q)
- 853rd Bombardment Squadron (T8)
- 854th Bombardment Squadron (6X)
- 855th Bombardment Squadron (V2)

The squadrons were unusual in having their ground complement recruited from other stations of the 2nd Air Division. The group commenced operations on 2 June 1944.

The 491st attacked airfields, bridges, and coastal defenses both before and during the D-Day invasion of Normandy. After D-Day, the unit concentrated its attacks on strategic objectives in Germany, striking communications centers, oil refineries, storage depots, industrial areas, shipyards, and other targets in such places as Berlin, Hamburg, Kassel, Cologne, Gelsenkirchen, Bielefeld, Hannover, and Magdeburg.

On one occasion the 491st attacked the headquarters of the German General Staff at Zossen, Germany.

On 15 August 1944, the 95th Combat wing was broken up and the 491st was moved to RAF North Pickenham.

==== 1409th Army Air Force Base Unit ====
After the 491st moved, a small number of B-24's were still assigned to Metfield, under the command of the European Division of Air Transport, United States Strategic Air Forces in Europe (USSTAF). These aircraft were used by the 1409th Army Air Force Base Unit, a classified unit engaged in clandestine transport operations to Sweden, flying out special materials and ferrying personnel.

The 1409th operated from Metfield until the end of the war operating the B-24s, as well as Douglas C-47 Skytrains and Douglas C-54 Skymasters. The unit also used RAF Leuchars in Scotland as an advanced base.

On 4 March 1945, during Germany's "Operation Gisela", RAF Metfield was strafed by a Junkers Ju 88G-6, which then crashed just south of the airfield, after attempting to attack an inbound B24 with its Schräge Musik upward-firing cannon. The attack killed one man in the control tower.

==== Metfield explosion ====
On 15 July 1944 at 7:30pm there was a major explosion at the Metfield bomb dump. Some soldiers from the 2218th Quartermaster Truck Company had arrived to deliver bombs. When they arrived, soldiers at the dump who operated the hoist were on a meal break; impatient, the Quartermaster group decided to unload the bombs without the hoist, dropping the bombs off the back of the truck, as had been done successfully in the past. However these bombs' fuzes were more sensitive than previous munitions; when they dropped a bomb on top of another they both detonated, setting off 1,200 tons of high-explosive and incendiary bombs at the bomb store, a detonation heard several miles away. Six men were killed. Three soldiers, Privates Donald P. Adkins, Donald L. Hurley and Steve W. Suchey are memorialised at Cambridge American Cemetery as missing in action. Five B-24 bombers in nearby hardstands were damaged beyond repair, and six more were severely damaged. There is an eyewitness account of being blown flat 3.5 miles away from the explosion.

After the explosion, an extended loop road was built to by-pass the crater, which became used as a dump.

=== Royal Air Force use ===
In May 1945, RAF Metfield was closed and returned to the RAF. It was subsequently abandoned, but remained in the hands of the Air Ministry.

== Post-war ==
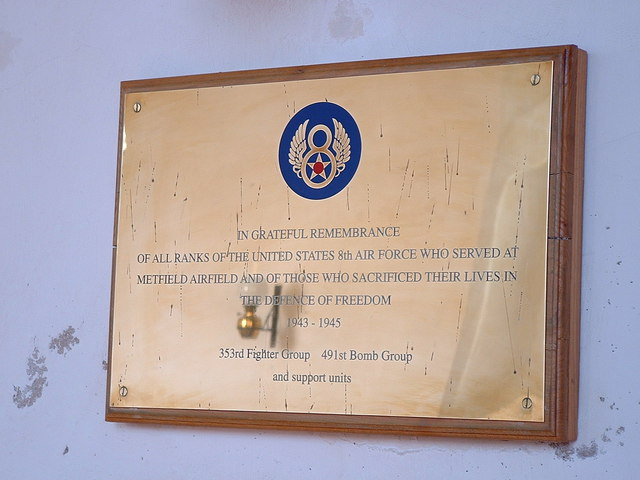
Memorial plaque to U.S.A.A.F. to 353rd Fighter Group and 491st bomb group

RAF Metfield was not used by the Air Ministry after the Second World War ended and for years it sat abandoned and empty. In 1964 and 1965 the airfield and support buildings were sold to private individuals.

The former airfield was returned to agricultural use. The site of the bomb dump explosion had become a pond, which was drained, revealing discarded equipment and several unexploded bombs. Ordnance fragments dispersed by the bomb dump explosion are still found around the area.

In the late 1960s the main runways, taxiways and parking aprons were mostly torn up, with some turned into single-lane agricultural roads.

Only a few brick buildings, deteriorating Quonset (Nissen) huts, and some concrete aircraft taxiways remain to indicate that there had been an airfield there.

== See also ==
- List of former Royal Air Force stations
