= RAF North Pickenham =

Former RAF station in Norfolk, England

RAF North Pickenham USAAF Station 143
- North Pickenham, Norfolk in England
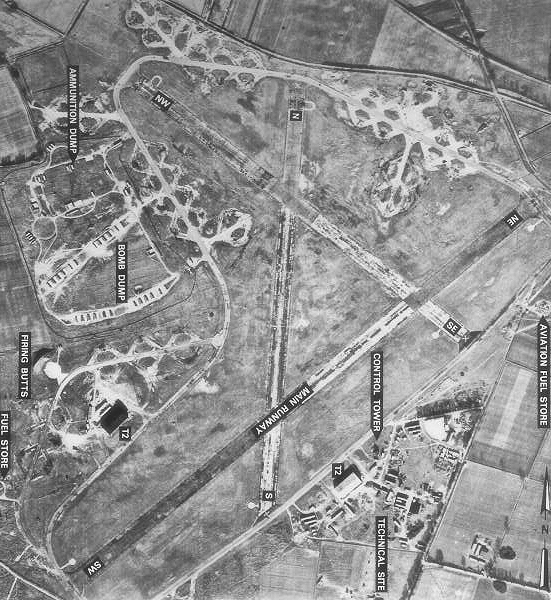
- North Pickenham Airfield - 31 January 1946

Site information
- Type: Royal Air Force station
- Code: NP
- Owner: Ministry of Defence
- Operator: Royal Air Force; United States Army Air Forces

Location
- Shown within Norfolk
- Coordinates: 52°37′37″N 000°43′59″E

Site history
- Built: 1942
- In use: 1944-1967

Airfield information
- Elevation: 57 metres (187 ft) AMSL
Runways
Direction	Length and surface
04/22	1,710 metres (5,610 ft) Concrete
12/30	1,230 metres (4,035 ft) Concrete
18/36	1,230 metres (4,035 ft) Concrete

Royal Air Force North Pickenham or more simply RAF North Pickenham is a former Royal Air Force station located 3 miles (4.8 km) East of Swaffham, Norfolk, England.

It was originally opened in 1944 and finally closed in 1967.

== History ==
=== USAAF use ===
North Pickenham was constructed in 1942/1943 as an "A" class heavy bomber station. It was handed over to the United States Army Air Forces (USAAF) Eighth Air Force in April 1944. It was assigned USAAF designation Station 143.

==== 492nd Bombardment Group (Heavy) ====
The first USAAF group to use North Pickenham was the 492nd Bombardment Group (Heavy), arriving from Alamogordo AAF, New Mexico on 18 April 1944. The 492nd was assigned to the 14th Combat Bombardment Wing, and the group tail code was a "Circle-U". Its operational squadrons were:

- 856th Bombardment Squadron (5Z)
- 857th Bombardment Squadron (9H)
- 858th Bombardment Squadron (9A)
- 859th Bombardment Squadron (X4)

The group flew Consolidated B-24 Liberators as part of the Eighth Air Force's strategic bombing campaign.

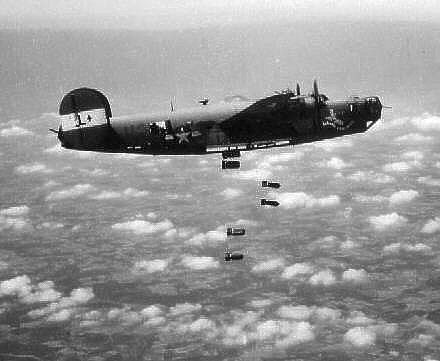
B-24 of the 492d Bomb Group on a mission over Nazi Occupied Europe.

The 492nd Bomb Group entered service in May 1944, and suffered tremendous losses in July. In the words of one veteran, "the whole group was wiped out." In the three months it was operational it had flown a total of sixty-four missions losing fifty-one aircraft to enemy action and six by other causes. Subsequently, due to its heavy losses the organization was transferred to RAF Harrington on 5 August for special operations duty less personnel and equipment and the surviving personnel transferred to other B-24 units.

==== 491st Bombardment Group (Heavy) ====
With the departure of the 492d BG, North Pickenham was assigned to the 491st Bombardment Group (Heavy), relocating from RAF Metfield, Suffolk, in August 1944. The 491st was assigned to the 14th Combat Bombardment Wing, and the group tail code was a "Circle-Z". Its operational squadrons were:

- 852nd Bombardment Squadron (3Q)
- 853rd Bombardment Squadron (T8)
- 854th Bombardment Squadron (6X)
- 855th Bombardment Squadron (V2)

The group flew Consolidated B-24 Liberators as part of the Eighth Air Force's strategic bombing campaign.

The 491st Bomb Group, less the air echelon, was transferred without personnel and equipment to North Pickenham initially in February 1944 briefly before being transferred to RAF Metfield in March. With the withdrawal of the 492nd Bomb Group from operational missions in August the group was transferred back to North Pickenham .

Upon its return, the 491st concentrated its attacks on strategic objectives in Germany, striking communications centers, oil refineries, storage depots, industrial areas, shipyards, and other targets in such places as Berlin, Hamburg, Kassel, Cologne, Gelsenkirchen, Bielefeld, Hanover, and Magdeburg; on one occasion attacked the headquarters of the German General Staff at Zossen, Germany.

While on a mission to bomb an oil refinery at Misburg on 26 November 1944, the group was attacked by large numbers of enemy fighters; although about one-half of its planes were destroyed, the remainder fought off the interceptors, successfully bombed the target, and won for the group a Distinguished Unit Citation.

Although engaged primarily in strategic bombardment, the group also supported ground forces at Saint-Lô in July 1944; assaulted V-weapon sites and communications lines in France during the summer of 1944; dropped supplies to paratroops on 18 September 1944 during the airborne attack in the Netherlands; bombed German supply lines and fortifications during the Battle of the Bulge, December 1944-January 1945; supported Allied forces in the airborne drop across the Rhine in March 1945; and interdicted enemy communications during the Allied drive across Germany in April 1945.

The 491st Bomb Group returned to McChord AAF Washington on 17 July 1945 and was inactivated on 8 September 1945.

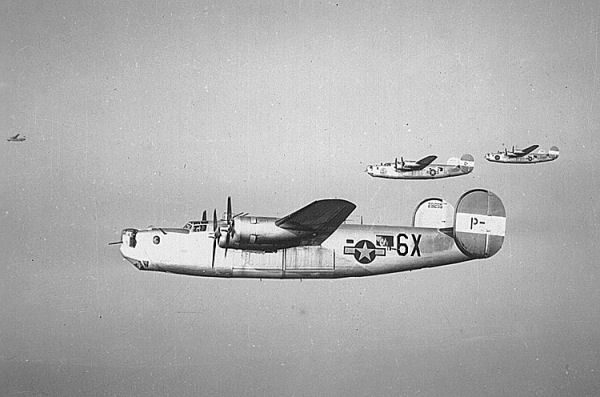
B-24s of the 854th Bomb Squadron on a mission

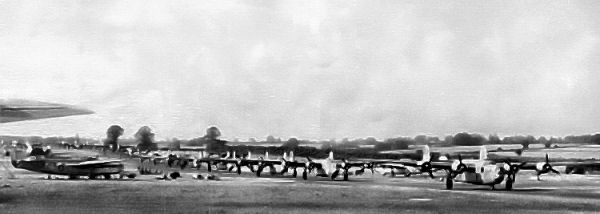
Consolidated B-24 Liberators of the 491st Bomb Group lining up for takeoff

=== Post-war RAF use ===
The USAAF evacuated North Pickenham in August 1945 with the airfield becoming an RAF satellite for No. 258 Maintenance Unit RAF (MU) at RAF Shipdham. North Pickenham was transferred to RAF Bomber Command in March 1948 and became inactive on 26 October. In August 1949, the airfield was transferred back to RAF Maintenance Command and became home to No. 281 MU.

On 1 December 1958 the station was reopened as the home for the newly reformed No. 220 Squadron RAF, equipped with Thor nuclear missiles; the squadron was deactivated in October 1963 and the missiles removed.

North Pickenham was later used for testing the Hawker P.1127, an experimental aircraft which would later evolve into the Hawker Siddeley Harrier, and the site was finally sold in 1967 at which point the station was officially closed.

== Current use ==
With the end of military control, the airfield was developed into the site of a large turkey farm with sheds built along all three runways. Later on a karting circuit was developed using part of the perimeter track and dispersal pans. The remaining T2 hangar burnt to the ground in November 2014. Only a few bomb stores now remain on the airfield site, however at some of the dispersed sites in and around North Pickenham village a few of the wartime buildings can still be found, including the headquarters block.

A memorial stone in honour of the two Bomb Groups that flew from North Pickenham was dedicated during a 2d Air Division reunion in 1987. It is situated at the entrance to what was Site 4, the old mess site.

On 11 November 1990 a quartz clock was presented to the villagers of North Pickenham by the 492d Bombardment Group. It hangs in the sanctuary of the parish church. A plaque in the church at Metfield was dedicated in 1992.

A memorial bench in honour of the 491st Bombardment Group stands adjacent to the North Pickenham Village sign.

== See also ==
- List of former Royal Air Force stations
