= Lake Osborne =

Lake in the state of Florida, United States

- Location within Florida Location within the United States
- Location: Palm Beach County, Florida
- Coordinates: 26.5953°N 80.0783°W
- Basin countries: United States
- Average depth: 6.8 ft (2.1 m)
- Max. depth: 27 ft (8.2 m)
- Settlements: Lake Worth

Lake Osborne, Florida, USA is a 378-acre (152.9 hectares) lake that is part of a system of once natural freshwater lakes lying along the western slope of the coastal ridge in Palm Beach County just west of the Florida Intracoastal Waterway and Atlantic Ocean. It is located within the C-16 drainage basin which occupies approximately 40,031 acres of land (16,200 hectares). Five drainage canals discharge directly to Lake Osborne, and Lake Osborne discharges via the E-4 canal to the C16 and C51 canals to the Lake Worth Lagoon. The lake is bordered on the west by John Prince Memorial Park, and on the east be the City of Lake Worth.

This lake system has been greatly impacted from human activities. It has been extensively modified and reduced in size by dredge and fill activities from urban and residential development; several lakes were completely filled and built upon. The lakes were probably dredged contemporaneous with canal construction in the 1920s or earlier. It is likely that filling of the adjacent wetlands for residential construction occurred at the same time or later. Square Lake and its oxbow lake were dredged for fill in the 1960s and additional dredging occurred in the north lobe of Lake Osborne in the 1970s.

Degradation of the lake's water quality has been ongoing; however, with the elimination of domestic waste discharges 20+ years ago, the water quality has shown improvement. Eutrophication continues as a result of continued discharges of stormwater and agricultural and yard/street runoff. More than two dozen stormwater outfalls are situated within 1000 ft of Lake Osborne. In addition to the lake's loss of habitat value due to urban and residential growth, there has been significant establishment of exotic vegetation, fish, and molluscan species that have disrupted the lake's ecosystem function.

Lake Osborne is important to Palm Beach County for transporting, processing, and storing stormwater and serving as a water supply reservoir. It is also of considerable value to the county for its scenic value and the recreational opportunities it provides. It is heavily used for boating and fishing as well as a variety of shore-based activities. In addition, John Prince Park, located along the western shoreline of Lake Osborne's north and central lobe, offers an ecotourism destination for visitors seeking a natural experience where they can enjoy and learn about this ecosystem.

Due to development, vegetated littoral areas in and adjacent to Lake Osborne have been reduced to a fragment of their original size. The lake shorelines predominantly consist of bare sand or mowed grass and exotic and/or invasive vegetation. John Prince Park maintains a lawn like appearance for the majority of the shorelines of Lake Osborne. Within the water column exotic vegetation, such as water lettuce (Pistia stratiotes), water hyacinth (Eichhornia crassipes), hydrilla (Hydrilla verticillata), and now Hygrophila (Hygrophila spp.), pose an ongoing nuisance and are treated with aquatic herbicides. With the loss of aquatic habitat, fish populations within the lake are becoming more represented by rough species, such as Tilapia (Tilapia sp. and Oreochromis sp.).
