= Ketteringham =

Village in Norfolk, England

Coordinates: 52.57753°N 1.1918°E

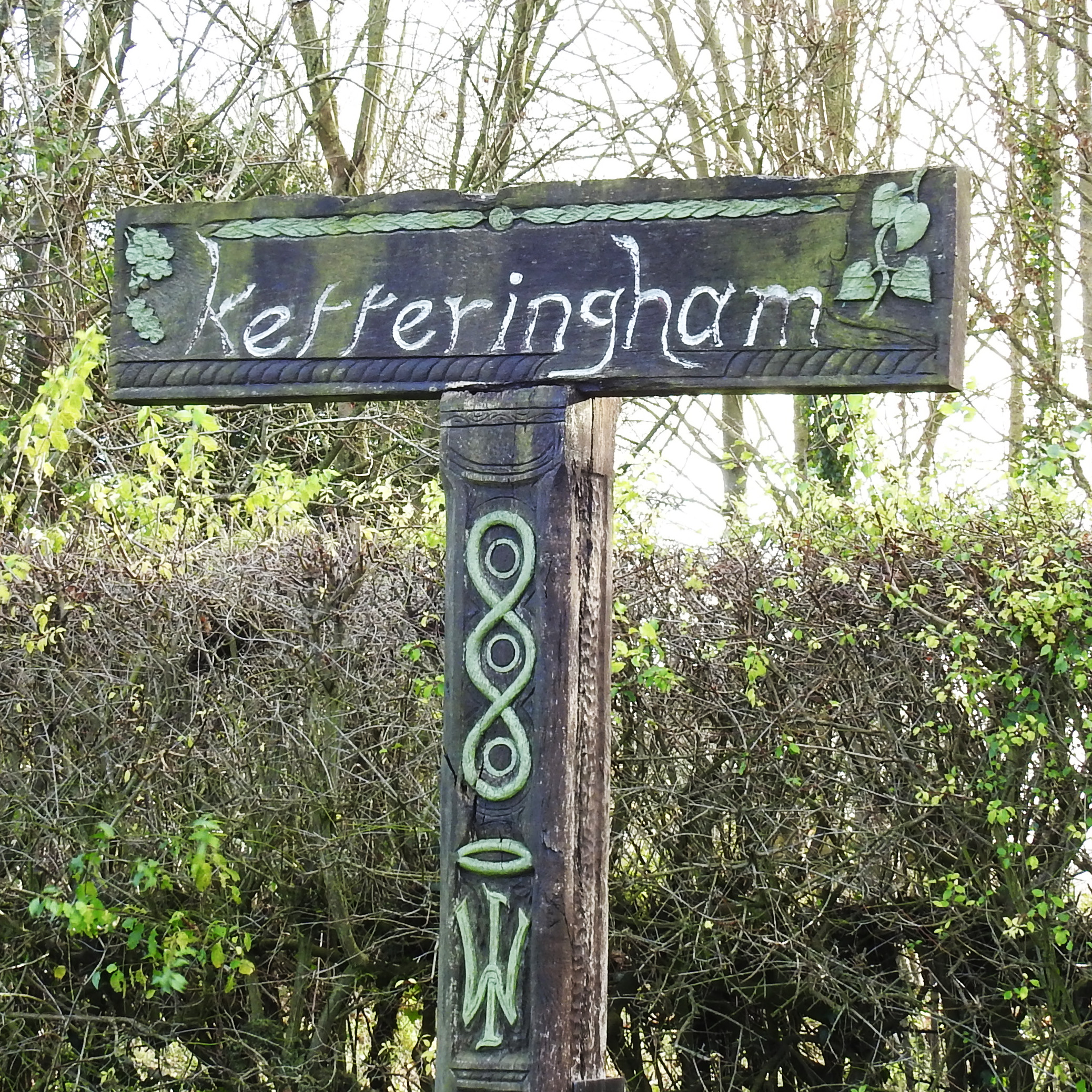
- Ketteringham Village Sign

- Location within Norfolk
- Area: 2.51 sq mi (6.5 km^{2})
- Population: 180 (2021 Census)
  - Density: 72/sq mi (28/km^{2})
- OS grid reference: TG163025
- Civil parish: Ketteringham
- District: South Norfolk
- Shire county: Norfolk
- Region: East
- Country: England
- Sovereign state: United Kingdom
- Post town: WYMONDHAM
- Postcode district: NR18
- Dialling code: 01603
- Police: Norfolk
- Fire: Norfolk
- Ambulance: East of England
- UK Parliament: South Norfolk

Ketteringham is a village and civil parish in the English county of Norfolk.

Ketteringham is located 3 miles (4.8 km) north-east of Wymondham and 5.4 miles (8.7 km) south-west of Norwich.

== History ==
Ketteringham's name is of Anglo-Saxon origin and derives from the Old English for the homestead of Cytra's people.

In the Domesday Book, Ketteringham is listed as a settlement of 38 households in the hundred of Humbleyard. In 1086, the village was divided between the East Anglian estates of Roger Bigod and Ranulf Peverel.

Ketteringham Hall was originally built in the Sixteenth Century which was extensively remodelled in the Nineteenth Century after a devastating fire. The house is an example of Gothic Revival architecture and is now in the ownership of Lotus Cars.

== Geography ==
According to the 2021 census, Ketteringham has a total population of 180 people which demonstrates an increase from the 178 people listed in the 2011 census.

== St. Peter's Church ==
Ketteringham's parish church is dedicated to Saint Peter and dates from the Thirteenth Century. St. Peter's is located on Church Road and has been Grade II listed since 1959. The church holds Sunday service once a month.

St. Peter's holds various carved memorials to the various families who have lived in Ketteringham Hall as well as a set of medieval stained-glass roundels.

== Governance ==
Ketteringham is part of the electoral ward of Mulbarton & Stoke Holy Cross for local elections and is part of the district of South Norfolk.

The village's national constituency is South Norfolk which has been represented by the Labour's Ben Goldsborough MP since 2024.

== War Memorial ==
Ketteringham War Memorial is a small Celtic-cross in St. Peter's Churchyard which was funded by Sir Maurice Boileau of Ketteringham Hall. The memorial lists the following names for the First World War:

Rank	Name	Unit	Date of death	Burial/Commemoration
Sjt.	George Betts	4th Bn., Norfolk Regiment	2 Nov. 1917	Gaza War Cemetery
Cpl.	Walter Dawson	4th Bn., Norfolk Regt.	19 Apr. 1917	Jerusalem Memorial
LCpl.	Cecil Humphreys	207th Coy., Royal Engineers	10 Jul. 1916	Gordon Dump Cemetery
Pte.	John Page	12th Bn., Bedfordshire Regiment	19 Feb. 1917	Queen's Road Cemetery
Pte.	Reginald W. Tooke	1st Bn., Norfolk Regiment	27 Jul. 1916	Thiepval Memorial
Pte.	Arthur G. Beaumont	9th Bn., Norfolk Regt.	26 Sep. 1915	Loos Memorial

The following names were added after the Second World War:

Rank	Name	Unit	Date of death	Burial/Commemoration
Gnr.	Frederick C. Browne	65 AT Regt., Royal Artillery	1 Dec. 1941	Knightsbridge War Cemetery
Pte.	Hugh A. Salter	4th Bn., Royal Norfolk Regiment	1 Dec. 1945	St. Peter's Churchyard
