= Communications center =

In telecommunications, the term communications center has the following meanings:

1. An agency charged with the responsibility for handling and controlling communications traffic. The center normally includes a message center, and transmitting and receiving facilities.
2. A facility that (a) serves as a node for a communications network, (b) is equipped for technical control and maintenance of the circuits originating, transiting, or terminating at the node, (c) may contain message-center facilities, and (d) may serve as a gateway. Synonym comm center.

== See also ==
- Network operations center
