= Heinz Kemethmüller =

German fighter ace and Knight's Cross recipient (1914–1984)

- Born: 20 June 1914; Nuremberg, German Empire
- Died: 20 February 1984 (aged 69); Bonn, West Germany
- Military career
- Allegiance: Nazi Germany
- Branch: Luftwaffe
- Service years: 1935–1945
- Rank: Oberleutnant (first lieutenant)
- Units: JG 3, JG 26
- Commands: 4./JG 26
- Conflicts: World War II: Eastern Front; Defence of the Reich
- Awards: Knight's Cross of the Iron Cross

Heinz Kemethmüller (26 June 1914 – 20 February 1984) was a Luftwaffe ace and recipient of the Knight's Cross of the Iron Cross during World War II. The Knight's Cross of the Iron Cross, and its variants were the highest awards in the military and paramilitary forces of Nazi Germany during World War II.

== Early life and career ==
Kemethmüller was born on 26 June 1914 in Nuremberg in the Kingdom of Bavaria within the German Empire. He volunteered for military service in the Wehrmacht of Nazi Germany in 1935. Initially serving in the Army, he transferred to the Luftwaffe (air force) in 1939. Following flight and fighter pilot training, (Note: Flight training in the Luftwaffe progressed through the levels A1, A2 and B1, B2, referred to as A/B flight training. A training included theoretical and practical training in aerobatics, navigation, long-distance flights and dead-stick landings. The B courses included high-altitude flights, instrument flights, night landings and training to handle the aircraft in difficult situations. For pilots destined to fly multi-engine aircraft, the training was completed with the Luftwaffe Advanced Pilot's Certificate (Erweiterter Luftwaffen-Flugzeugführerschein), also known as the C-Certificate.) Kemethmüller was posted to 8. Staffel (8th squadron) of Jagdgeschwader 3 (JG 3—3rd Fighter Wing) in early 1941. At the time, the Staffel was commanded by Oberleutnant Willy Stange and subordinated to III. Gruppe of JG 3 headed by Hauptmann Walter Oesau.

=== War against the Soviet Union ===
On 18 June, III. Gruppe relocated to Moderówka in south-eastern Poland. On 22 June, German forces launched Operation Barbarossa, the German invasion of the Soviet Union. At the start of the campaign, JG 3 was subordinated to the V. Fliegerkorps (5th Air Corps), under command of General der Flieger Robert Ritter von Greim, which was part of Luftflotte 4 (4th Air Fleet), under command of Generaloberst Alexander Löhr. These air elements supported Generalfeldmarschall Gerd von Rundstedt's Heeresgruppe Süd (Army Group South), with the objective of capturing Ukraine and its capital Kiev. Due to pilot error, Kemethmüller crash landed his Messerschmitt Bf 109 F-2 (Werknummer 8146—factory number) that day at Moderówka.

On 6 July 1941, Kemethmüller's Bf 109 F-2 (Werknummer 8162) was damaged in aerial combat with PZL.37 Łoś bombers near Polonne. Both Kemethmüller and Feldwebel Siegfried Engfer from 9. Staffel of JG 3 claimed their 50th aerial victories on 18 September 1942. Consequently both pilots were awarded the Knight's Cross of the Iron Cross (Ritterkreuz des Eisernen Kreuzes) on 2 October 1942. He received the Knight's Cross following his 59th aerial victory, which he had claimed on 355 combat missions.

=== With Jagdgeschader 26 on the Western and Eastern Front ===
On 30 December 1942, Kemethmüller was transferred to Jagdgeschwader 26 "Schlageter" (JG 26—26th Fighter Wing). Here, he was assigned to 7. Staffel under the command of Oberleutnant Klaus Mietusch, a Staffel of III. Gruppe based at Wevelgem. On 13 January 1943, the United States Army Air Forces (USAAF) VIII Bomber Command flew a mission to Lille, targeting the locomotive works and steel factory. Both I. and III. Gruppe of JG 26 were scrambled and intercepted the bombers near Calais. In a frontal attack of the Boeing B-17 Flying Fortress heavy bombers from the 305th Bombardment Group, Kemethmüller was credited with the destruction of a B-17 bomber between Ypres and Lille.

Emblem of JG 26

On 4 February, Kemethmüller's Focke-Wulf Fw 190 A-4 (Werknummer 2438—factory number) sustained engine damage in combat with fighters of (Royal Air Force) (RAF) No. 331 Squadron, resulting in a forced landing north of Merville. Injuries sustained in the encounter kept him grounded until mid-May, when his Staffel had already relocated to the Eastern Front.

In January 1943, the Luftwaffe planned to move JG 26 to the Eastern Front. The idea was to exchange JG 26 with Jagdgeschwader 54 (JG 54—54th Fighter Wing) which supported Army Group North. In order to keep up operations, the exchange was planned by rotating each Gruppe by Gruppe and every Staffel by Staffel. In this context, 7. Staffel of JG 26 was attached to I. Gruppe of JG 54 which was commanded by Hauptmann Hans Philipp and was based outside of Leningrad. On 17 February, 7. Staffel left Courtrai, heading east by train. Following a stop at Heiligenbeil, the unit was based at the airbase at Krasnogvardeysk, present day Gatschina, which is located approximately 40 kilometers (25 miles) southwest of Leningrad. At Heiligenbeil, 7. Staffel received 13 new Fw 190 A-4 and A-5 fighters. The combat area of I. Gruppe of JG 54 was predominantly over the front of 18th Army, on the left flank of Army Group North, and on the Volkhov River.

On 10 July, 7. Staffel left the Eastern Front, returning to Germany where they again joined III. Gruppe then based at Cuxhaven-Nordholz Airfield where they were equipped with the Bf 109 G. On 28 July, VIII Bomber Command sent 82 bombers of the 1st Bombardment Wing to Kassel while 120 bombers of the 4th Bombardment Wing attacked Oschersleben. Defending against this attack, Kemethmüller was credited with the destruction of a B-17 bomber north of Sylt. The following day, VIII Bomber Command attacked Kiel and Warnemünde. III. Gruppe intercpted the bombers near Heligoland, pursuing them on their attack run to Kiel. In the area of 15 kilometers (9.3 miles) northeast of Schleswig, Kemethmüller shot down a B-17 bomber of the 306th Bombardment Group.

III. Gruppe transferred from Cuxhaven-Nordholz to Amsterdam-Schiphol Airfield on 13 August. The USAAF targeted the German aircraft industry on 17 August in the Schweinfurt–Regensburg mission. On this mission, Kemethmüller claimed two B-17 bombers shot down. The first of which was a endgültige Vernichtung (final destruction), a coup de grâce inflicted on an already damaged heavy bomber, over a 385th Bombardment Group B-17 south of Woensdrecht, the second B-17 was claimed over Holland. Kemethmüller did not receive credit either of these two claims. Shortly after, he was shot down in his Bf 109 G-4 (Werknummer 19216) near Leopoldsburg by Major Loren G. McCollom, commander of the 353rd Fighter Group flying Republic P-47 Thunderbolt fighters. Sustaining wounds to his hands, Kemethmüller bailed out at low altitude and was hospitalized.

Following his convalescence, Kemethmüller returned to III. Gruppe of JG 26 in early January 1944, which was then based at Mönchengladbach. On 4 January, he flew his first combat mission since sustaining his injuries on 17 August 1943. During his absence from the Gruppe, as part of the group expansion from three Staffeln per Gruppe to four Staffeln per Gruppe, Kemethmüller' 7. Staffel had been re-designated on 1 October and had become the 9. Staffel of JG 26. On 9 January 1944, III. Gruppe returned to France with Gruppenstab (headquarters unit), 9. and 11. Staffel at Lille-Vendeville, and 10. and 12. Staffel at Denain. Here on 14 January, Kemethmüller claimed a Supermarine Spitfire fighter of the No. 308 Polish Fighter Squadron shot down near Calais. On 21 January, the USAAF Ninth Air Force sent 119 Martin B-26 Marauder bombers and their escorting Spifire fighters on a mission against V-1 flying bomb launch sites. III. Gruppe intercepted the formation south of Saint-Omer. In this encounter, Kemethmüller claimed a Spitfire fighter shot down, the claim was not approved.

On 17 April 1944, III. Gruppe relocated from Pocking to Munich-Neubiberg Airfield, flying training missions for the next three days. The Gruppe flew its first combat mission from southern Germany on 23 April when they were ordered to intercept a USAAF bomber formation of the Fifteenth Air Force south of Vienna. The bombers were escorted by North American P-51 Mustang fighters of the 31st Fighter Group. In this encounter, Kemethmüller claimed two P-51 fighters shot down, one south of Wiener Neustadt and a second south of Lake Neusiedl, only receiving credit for the second claim.

=== Squadron leader and end of war ===
On 24 April 1944, Kemethmüller was appointed Staffelkapitän (squadron leader) of 4. Staffel of JG 26. He succeeded Oberleutnant Wolfgang Neu who had been killed in action two days earlier. The Staffel was subordinated to I. Gruppe of JG 26, commanded by Hauptmann Karl Borris and based at Lille-Vendeville.

On 4 November, Kemethmüller was severely injured in landing accident in his Fw 190 A-9 (Werknummer 205206) at Greven. In consequence, he was replaced by Leutnant Waldemar Söffing as commander of 4. Staffel.

== Later life ==
Kemethmüller died on 20 February 1984 at the age of 69 in Bonn-Beuel, West Germany.

== Summary of career ==
=== Aerial victory claims ===
According to US historian David T. Zabecki, Kemethmüller was credited with 89 aerial victories. Spick also lists Kemethmüller with 89 aerial victories claimed in 463 combat missions. This figure includes 70 claims on the Eastern Front and 19 over the Western Allies, including three four-engined bombers. Mathews and Foreman, authors of Luftwaffe Aces — Biographies and Victory Claims, researched the German Federal Archives and found documentation for 88 aerial victory claims, plus three further unconfirmed claims. This number includes eighteen on the Western Front, including three four-engined bombers, and 70 on the Eastern Front.

Victory claims were logged to a map-reference (PQ = Planquadrat), for example "PQ 26 Ost 80442". The Luftwaffe grid map (Jägermeldenetz) covered all of Europe, western Russia and North Africa and was composed of rectangles measuring 15 minutes of latitude by 30 minutes of longitude, an area of about 360 square miles (930 km^{2}). These sectors were then subdivided into 36 smaller units to give a location area 3 km × 4 km (1.9 mi × 2.5 mi) in size.

Chronicle of aerial victories
This and the – (dash) indicates unwitnessed aerial victory claims for which Kemethmüller did not receive credit. This and the ? (question mark) indicates information discrepancies listed by Prien, Stemmer, Rodeike, Balke, Bock, Mathews and Foreman.
Claim	Date	Time	Type	Location	Claim	Date	Time	Type	Location
– 8. Staffel of Jagdgeschwader 3 – Operation Barbarossa — 22 June – 5 December 1941
1	29 June 1941	16:20	ZKB-19? (Note: According to Mathews and Foreman claimed as an Ilyushin DB-3.)		5	19 August 1941	09:15	DB-3	
2	17 July 1941	19:15	DB-3		6	2 October 1941	13:08	DB-3	
3	9 August 1941	06:20	SB-3		7	3 October 1941	16:40	Il-2	
4	11 August 1941	05:35	SB-2		8	3 October 1941	09:30? (Note: According to Mathews and Foreman claimed at 09:35.)	Il-2	10 km (6.2 mi) east of Oryol
– 8. Staffel of Jagdgeschwader 3 "Udet" – Eastern Front — 6 December 1941 – 30 April 1942
9	22 February 1942	08:10? (Note: According to Mathews and Foreman claimed at 08:00.)	I-61 (MiG-3)	10 km (6.2 mi) south-southeast of Staraya Russa	10	15 March 1942	10:22	Pe-2	8 km (5.0 mi) west-northwest of Litzinowo
– 8. Staffel of Jagdgeschwader 3 "Udet" – Eastern Front — 6 December 1941 – 30 April 1942
11	22 May 1942	16:35	MiG-1	3 km (1.9 mi) east of Bugajewka	36	31 August 1942	09:08	Il-2	Kuzmyn
12	21 June 1942	17:15	I-153	west of Nowoschuli	37? (Note: This claim is not listed by Mathews and Foreman.)	3 September 1942	10:13	MiG-3	
13	2 July 1942	07:02? (Note: According to Mathews and Foreman claimed at 07:05.)	MiG-3		38	6 September 1942	09:35	Il-2	3 km (1.9 mi) east of Kotluban train station
14	4 July 1942	13:55	Il-2		39	6 September 1942	14:35	MiG-3	20 km (12 mi) northeast of Stalingrad
15	4 July 1942	17:15	Boston		40	7 September 1942	14:00	Il-2	8 km (5.0 mi) north of Stalingrad
16	4 July 1942	17:20	Boston		41	10 September 1942	11:40	Il-2	western edge of Stalingrad
17	6 July 1942	19:35	MiG-3		42	10 September 1942	11:43	Il-2	western edge of Stalingrad
18	9 July 1942	18:56	Yak-4		43	11 September 1942	07:10	Il-2	6 km (3.7 mi) northeast of Stalingrad
19	9 July 1942	18:58	Yak-4		44	11 September 1942	16:15? (Note: According to Mathews and Foreman claimed at 16:13.)	Pe-2	15 km (9.3 mi) northeast of Dubovka
20	11 July 1942	13:50	MiG-3? (Note: According to Mathews and Foreman claimed as a Lavochkin-Gorbunov-Gudkov LaGG-3.)		45	11 September 1942	16:17	Pe-2	20 km (12 mi) northeast of Dubovka
21	17 July 1942	18:38	LaGG-3		46	12 September 1942	12:10	Il-2	Soadki
22	26 July 1942	14:15	Pe-2		47	15 September 1942	08:40	MiG-3	3 km (1.9 mi) south of Stalingrad
23	26 July 1942	14:18? (Note: According to Mathews and Foreman claimed at 14:16.)	Pe-2		48	15 September 1942	09:15	Il-2	west of Stalingrad
24	3 August 1942	17:20	LaGG-3	southeast of Kalach	49	16 September 1942	16:15	Il-2	3 km (1.9 mi) northeast of Kasuga
25	8 August 1942	09:32	Pe-2	south-southeast of Kalach	50	18 September 1942	10:50	Il-2	Gorodishche train station
26	8 August 1942	09:33	Pe-2	south-southeast of Kalach	51	18 September 1942	16:40	Il-2	eastern edge of Stalingrad
27	13 August 1942	17:46	BB-1? (Note: According to Mathews and Foreman claimed as a Ilyushin Il-2.)	north of Kartowka	52	18 September 1942	16:41? (Note: According to Mathews and Foreman claimed at 16:45.)	Il-2	5 km (3.1 mi) east of Stalingrad
28	17 August 1942	16:45? (Note: According to Mathews and Foreman claimed at 17:00.)	Il-2	Kotluban	53	18 September 1942	16:50	La-5	3 km (1.9 mi) north of Akhtuba
29	18 August 1942	06:50? (Note: According to Mathews and Foreman claimed at 07:15.)	Il-2	east of Katschalinskaya	54	23 September 1942	08:27	Il-2	3 km (1.9 mi) east of edge of Stalingrad
30	19 August 1942	04:55	MiG-3	Katschalinskaya	55	27 September 1942	16:00	Il-2	western edge of Stalingrad
31	23 August 1942	18:10	Pe-2	Kotluban	56	29 September 1942	12:02	Il-2	5 km (3.1 mi) north of Stalingrad
32	25 August 1942	09:10	Pe-2	Staro-Schostkaja	57	29 September 1942	12:06	Il-2	4 km (2.5 mi) north of Stalingrad
33	30 August 1942	09:20	Il-2	northeast of Radkovo	58	30 September 1942	05:42	Il-2	5 km (3.1 mi) south of Kotluban train station
34	30 August 1942	09:25	Il-2	northeast of Radkovo	59	30 September 1942	15:03	LaGG-3	8 km (5.0 mi) south of Kotluban train station
35	31 August 1942	09:05	Il-2	Buchowka	60	4 October 1942	07:20	LaGG-3	8 km (5.0 mi) east of Dubovka
– 7. Staffel of Jagdgeschwader 26 "Schlageter" – On the Western Front — 1 January – 17 February 1943
61	13 January 1943	14:45	B-17	Warneton/Furnes vicinity of Düren	62	3 February 1943	11:12	Ventura	northwest of Dunkirk
– 7. Staffel of Jagdgeschwader 26 "Schlageter" – Eastern Front — 17 February – 10 July 1943
63	21 May 1943	05:46	Pe-2	PQ 26 Ost 80442, Lake Glubokoye	69	8 June 1943	15:57	I-180 (Yak-7)	PQ 36 Ost 20123, 3 km (1.9 mi) northwest of Volkhov
64	21 May 1943	05:51	LaGG-3	PQ 26 Ost 80283	—	8 June 1943? (Note: According to Mathews and Foreman claimed on 6 June 1943.)	—	I-180 (Yak-7)	
65	21 May 1943	10:21	I-16	PQ 26 Ost 70221, south of Lavansaari	70	18 June 1943	06:13? (Note: According to Mathews and Foreman claimed at 06:12.)	Yak-1	PQ 36 Ost 20173, forest near Kinderovo
66	30 May 1943	13:35	LaGG-3	PQ 36 Ost 10112, Kopena	71	18 June 1943	12:22	LaGG-3	PQ 36 Ost 20113, Wolchowstroj
67	2 June 1943	14:55	La-5	PQ 26 Ost 90113, 2 km (1.2 mi) west of Lipovo	72	22 June 1943	02:33	Il-2	PQ 36 Ost 00552, east of Siverskaya
68	5 June 1943	12:10	P-40	PQ 36 Ost 20763; Lake Ladoga					
– 7. Staffel of Jagdgeschwader 26 "Schlageter" – On the Western Front — 10 January – 30 September 1944
73	28 July 1943	09:16	B-17	PQ 05 Ost S/RP-5 north of Sylt	—	17 August 1943	11:20	B-17	south of Woensdrecht
74	29 July 1943	09:30	B-17	15 km (9.3 mi) northeast of Schleswig	— (Note: This unconfirmed claim is not listed by Mathews and Foreman.)	17 August 1943	—	B-17	
– 9. Staffel of Jagdgeschwader 26 "Schlageter" – On the Western Front — 10 January – 23 April 1944
75	14 January 1944	11:50	Spitfire	PQ 05 Ost ND-5, Calais	76	13 April 1944	13:34? (Note: According to Mathews and Foreman claimed at 13:24.)	B-17	PQ 05 Ost northwest of Kaiserslautern
—	21 January 1944	12:45	Spitfire	Saint-Omer	77	23 April 1944	14:22	P-51	south of Lake Neusiedl
– 4. Staffel of Jagdgeschwader 26 "Schlageter" – On the Western Front — 24 April – 4 November 1944
78	8 May 1944	10:05	P-47	PQ 05 Ost PH-7/9 west of Hirson	84	14 July 1944	14:36	P-47	PQ 04 Ost N/AC; Saint-André-de-l'Eure Airfield
79	24 June 1944	21:37	P-47	PQ 05 Ost BC-2/5; 20 km (12 mi) northeast of Saint-Dizier	85	16 July 1944	21:31	P-47	PQ 05 Ost S/TB-3; 25 km (16 mi) southwest of Rouen
80	29 June 1944	08:40	Spitfire	PQ 05 Ost TB-8 north of Caen	86	18 July 1944	09:30	P-38	PQ 04 Ost N/AD-1; 25 km (16 mi) southeast of Vernon
81	12 July 1944	14:30	P-47	PQ 05 Ost UB-6 southwest of Elbeuf	87	26 August 1944	14:25	Spitfire	PQ 05 Ost TD-4 west of Beauvais
82	12 July 1944	14:31	P-47	PQ 05 Ost N/AB-6 west of Damville	88	16 September 1944	17:41	P-38	PQ 05 Ost ON-2/3; Monschau
83	13 July 1944	16:58	P-47	PQ 15 West US-2/6 northwest of Vernon	89	17 September 1944	17:56	Spitfire	PQ 05 Ost JN-7; Nijmegen-Kleve

=== Awards ===
- Iron Cross (1939) 2nd and 1st Class
- Honor Goblet of the Luftwaffe on 31 August 1942 as Feldwebel and pilot
- German Cross in Gold on 3 October 1942 as Feldwebel in the 8./Jagdgeschwader 3
- Knight's Cross of the Iron Cross on 2 October 1942 as Feldwebel and pilot in the 8./Jagdgeschwader 3 "Udet" (Note: According to Scherzer as pilot in the III./Jagdgeschwader 3 "Udet".)
