= Blickenstaff =

Blickenstaff is a surname. Notable people with the surname include:

- Heidi Blickenstaff (born 1971), American actress and singer
- Wayne K. Blickenstaff (1920–2011), United States Army Air Forces lieutenant colonel
