= Robert A. Elder =

American World War II flying ace

Robert Alexander Elder
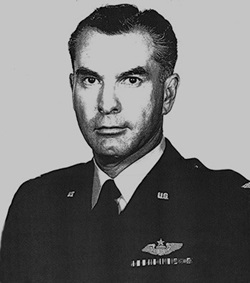
- Colonel Robert A. Elder
- Born: July 10, 1918; Joiner, Arkansas, US
- Died: November 26, 1994 (aged 76) Mississippi, US
- Allegiance: United States
- Branch: United States Army Air Corps; United States Army Air Forces; United States Air Force
- Service years: 1940–1960
- Rank: Colonel
- Conflicts: World War II
- Awards: Silver Star; Distinguished Flying Cross; Air Medal (5)

Robert Alexander Elder (July 10, 1918 – November 26, 1994) was a United States Air Force colonel. During World War II, he became a flying ace credited with five aerial victories, all of which occurred on the same date.

== Early life and career ==
Robert A. Elder was born on July 10, 1918, in Joiner, Arkansas. In 1940, upon graduating with a degree in physics from Southwestern Presbyterian University, Elder enlisted into the United States Army Air Corps in Memphis, Tennessee. Elder joined the Aviation Cadet Training Program, earning his flying wings and a commission to second lieutenant in April 1941.

== World War II ==
In February 1945, Major Elder was assigned to the 350th Fighter Squadron, 353rd Fighter Group, Eight Air Force, based in RAF Raydon in Suffolk, England. The squadron operated P-51 Mustangs.

=== Ace in a day ===
On March 24, 1945, Major Elder's squadron was on a patrol near Kassel, Germany, when they encountered 15 Messerschmitt Bf 109s flying top cover for 15 Focke-Wulf Fw 190s. Elder and his wingman both maneuvered behind a pair of Bf 109s, each man shooting a plane down and claiming a victory. Elder then dove down on the Fw190s, knocking a second plane out of the sky just 800 off the ground. He observed the canopy come off the Fw190 as the pilot was attempting to bail out right before it crashed and exploded.

Major Elder then got on the tail of another Fw190. The enemy pilot made several violent maneuvers before diving straight into the ground while attempting to get away from Elder. Elder then dove on a fourth plane which was flying right above the ground. Elder put a short burst of fire into the Fw190, immediately causing it to crash and explode.

By this time, Elder was being chased by several Fw190s, and he called for help over the radio. Lieutenant Colonel Wayne K. Blickenstaff came to Elder's aid and got the Germans off of his tail. Elder was then able to engage and shoot down another Fw190 with his last 50 rounds of ammunition. While he was doing this, Lieutenant Colonel Blickenstaff shot down a plane that was behind Elder.

Major Elder was credited with shooting down one Bf 109 and four Fw 190s in 30 minutes, making him an ace in a day. For his actions that day, Elder was awarded the Silver Star in June. Wayne Blickenstaff also shot down five enemy planes in the same action, he was awarded the Distinguished Service Cross. The squadron shot down 29 of the German planes, while losing five of their own.

=== Later war service ===
Lieutenant Colonel Elder was made the commanding officer of the 353rd Fighter Group in September 1945. Elder and the squadron returned to the United States in October. Elder finished the war with five aerial victories and destroyed two planes on the ground by strafing them.

== Post-war career and life ==
In August 1948, Elder received his master's degree from the Air Force Institute of Technology at Wright-Patterson Air Force Base. He was then assigned to The Pentagon until March 1951. He then did another tour in Europe, being stationed at Wiesbaden Air Base in West Germany until July 1954.

Colonel Elder was then assigned to Eglin Air Force Base, Florida, from July 1954 to August 1957. He then attended the Industrial College of the Armed Forces in Washington, D.C., graduating in July 1958. Afterwards, Elder was stationed at Andrews Air Force Base, Maryland, retiring there on October 1, 1960.

Robert A. Elder died on November 26, 1994. He was buried in Hernando, Mississippi.

== Awards and decorations ==
Command pilot badge

Silver Star
Distinguished Flying Cross
Air Medal with four bronze oak leaf clusters
Air Force Commendation Medal
American Defense Service Medal
American Campaign Medal
European-African-Middle Eastern Campaign Medal with four bronze campaign stars
World War II Victory Medal
Army of Occupation Medal with 'Germany' clasp
National Defense Service Medal
Air Force Longevity Service Award with four bronze oak leaf clusters

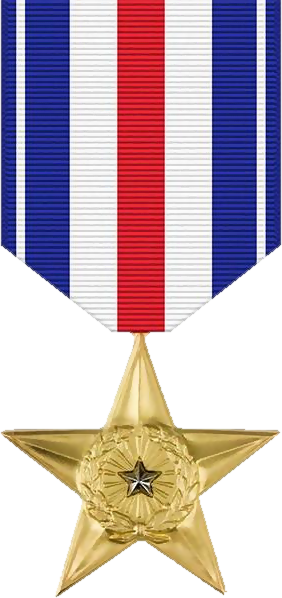

Silver Star for Actions of 24 March 1945

For gallantry in action while serving as Flight Commander in the EIGHTH Air Force, on a fighter sweep over Germany, 24 March 1945. Observing approximately fifteen FW-190's with a top cover of approximately fifteen ME-109's, Colonel Elder led his Flight in a daring attack against the high element. As the enemy scattered, Colonel Elder, with cool deliberation, proceeded to shoot down in flames one plane after another. Terminating his attack at tree top level with less than fifty rounds of ammunition, and under fire from three FW-190's, Colonel Elder executed a brilliant maneuver and destroyed one of the attacking planes before returning to base. A fitting tribute to Colonel Elder's conspicuous courage, enthusiasm, and disregard for personal safety is the fact that during this action he personally destroyed five enemy aircraft. The courage, flying skill, and unyielding fighting spirit displayed by Lieutenant Colonel Elder are in keeping with the finest traditions of the Army Air Forces.
