= Glenn Duncan =

Glen(n) Duncan may refer to:

- Glen Duncan (born 1965), British author
- Glenn E. Duncan (1918–1998), United States Air Force officer
- Glenn Duncan (ice hockey), selection in 1979 NHL entry draft
- W. Glenn Duncan, winner of the Shamus Award

== See also ==
- Duncan Glen (1933–2008), Scottish poet and literary editor
