= Wayne K. Blickenstaff =

American double ace fighter pilot and professional artist-illustrator

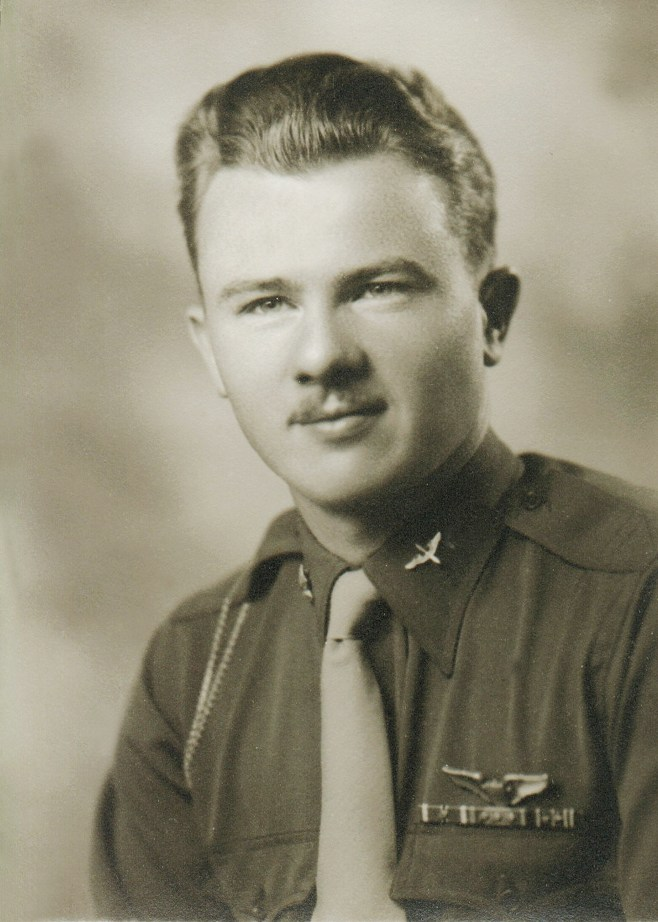
- Born: June 25, 1920; Pomona, California
- Died: December 23, 2011 (aged 91) Charlotte, North Carolina
- Allegiance: United States of America
- Branch: United States Army Air Forces
- Service years: 1942–1945
- Rank: Lieutenant Colonel
- Conflicts: World War II
- Awards: Distinguished Service Cross; Silver Star; Distinguished Flying Cross (4); Air Medal (8)
- Other work: Professional Illustrator

Wayne K. Blickenstaff (June 25, 1920 – December 23, 2011) was a highly decorated United States Army Air Forces lieutenant colonel. He was a flying ace credited with 10 aerial victories, including five in a single day, for which he was awarded the Distinguished Service Cross during World War II.

== Early life ==
Wayne K. Blickenstaff was born on June 25, 1920, in Pomona, California. After graduating from Pomona High School, he attended Woodbury Business College in Los Angeles, California.

== World War II ==
Blickenstaff enlisted in the Army Air Forces on January 28, 1942. He subsequently earned his flying wings and was commissioned as a second lieutenant. Lieutenant Blickenstaff was assigned to the 350th Fighter Squadron, 353rd Fighter Group, Eighth Air Force at RAF Metfield in Suffolk, England. He would fly a total of 133 combat missions during the war.

On December 1, 1943, he damaged a Messerschmitt Bf 109 over France. The squadron moved to RAF Raydon in Suffolk the following April. Blickenstaff was also promoted to captain and damaged another Bf 109 that month. He is believed to have later downed another over Germany on June 30, 1944. He was promoted to major in August.

=== Ace status ===
Major Blickenstaff finally scored his first official victory on November 27, 1944. Blickenstaff was leading his squadron to strafe an enemy supply depot in Germany. While near Brunswick, over 200 enemy planes attacked the American formations. Blickenstaff managed to shoot down four Fw 190s despite the cowling of his own P-51 Mustang being hit by enemy fire. Since some of the oil lines in his plane were hit, Blickenstaff was forced to land at Denain Airfield in Prouvy, France. For his actions that day, Major Blickenstaff was awarded the Silver Star.

On February 22, 1945, Major Blickenstaff claimed his fifth victory of the war. While near Berlin, his squadron encountered four Me 262 jets. Blickenstaff and his flight dropped their extra fuel tanks in an effort to gain speed and chased one jet for about seven minutes. Unable to catch the jet and nearing Soviet lines, his flight broke off the chase. While returning, Blickenstaff spotted another Me 262 flying below him. Gaining speed in a dive, he was able to score numerous hits on the jet, forcing the pilot to bail out. With this victory, Blickenstaff distinguished himself as a flying ace, and one of the few American pilots credited with a jet kill. Blickenstaff was promoted to lieutenant colonel on March 7, 1945.

=== Ace in a day status ===
On March 24, Lieutenant Colonel Blickenstaff was leading his squadron on a patrol near Kassel, Germany, when they encountered approximately 15 Bf 109s providing top cover for a similar number of Fw 190s several thousand feet below them. Blickenstaff quickly dove and got behind one Fw 190 and shot it down. Blickenstaff then fired at an Bf 109, getting several direct hits. He observed the canopy come off, but the plane crashed before the pilot had a chance to bail out.

While looking around for more targets, Lieutenant Colonel Blickenstaff observed a fellow P-51 pilot shoot down an Fw 190, which crashed into a tree line. Blickenstaff then saw a Bf 109 coming from his rear, but he was able to out-turn the aircraft and place several hits on it, causing it to crash into some trees.

At this point, Blickenstaff observed another pilot, Major Robert A. Elder, shoot down two Fw 190s as another enemy plane was on his tail. The Fw 190 on Elder's tail broke off and Blickenstaff opened fire on the plane. Although only one of his guns fired, Blickenstaff was still able to shoot the Fw 190 down. Blickenstaff then spotted another Fw 190 and called for another pilot to shoot it down. When no one responded, Blickenstaff managed to shoot it down with his one machine gun that was still operating.

Blickenstaff claimed three Fw 190s and two Bf 109s in 30 minutes, making him an ace in a day. Additionally, Major Elder also shot down five enemy planes. This was the only time in the history of Eighth Air Force when two pilots from the same unit destroyed five or more enemy aircraft in the same engagement. The squadron downed a total of 29 German aircraft, losing five of their own. Blickenstaff was awarded the Distinguished Service Cross for his actions that day. These were his final victories of the war, bringing his total number to 10.

== Post-war ==
When the war ended, Blickenstaff was discharged from Army Air Forces as a lieutenant colonel. He attended the Chouinard Art Institute in Los Angeles and became an artist/illustrator. He had three children from his first marriage and one child and three step-children from his second marriage. He retired in 1989. Wayne K. Blickenstaff died on December 23, 2011, in Charlotte, North Carolina.

== Summary of enemy aircraft damaged/destroyed ==
Chronicle of aerial victories
Date	#	Type	Location	Aircraft flown	Unit Assigned	Status
December 1, 1943	1	Messerschmitt Bf 109	Solingen, Germany	P-47D Thunderbolt	350 FS, 353 FG	Damaged
June 30, 1944	1; 1	Bf 109	Chalons, France	P-47D	350 FS, 353 FG	Damaged; Probable
November 27, 1944	4	Focke-Wulf Fw 190	Brunswick, Germany	P-51D Mustang	350 FS, 353 FG	Destroyed
February 22, 1945	1	Messerschmitt Me 262	Berlin, Germany	P-51D	350 FS, 353 FG	Destroyed
March 24, 1945	5	Fw 190	Kassel, Germany	P-51D	350 FS, 353 FG	Destroyed

All information on enemy aircraft damaged and destroyed is from Stars and Bars.
