= Walter C. Beckham =

United States Army Air Forces officer

Walter Carl Beckham
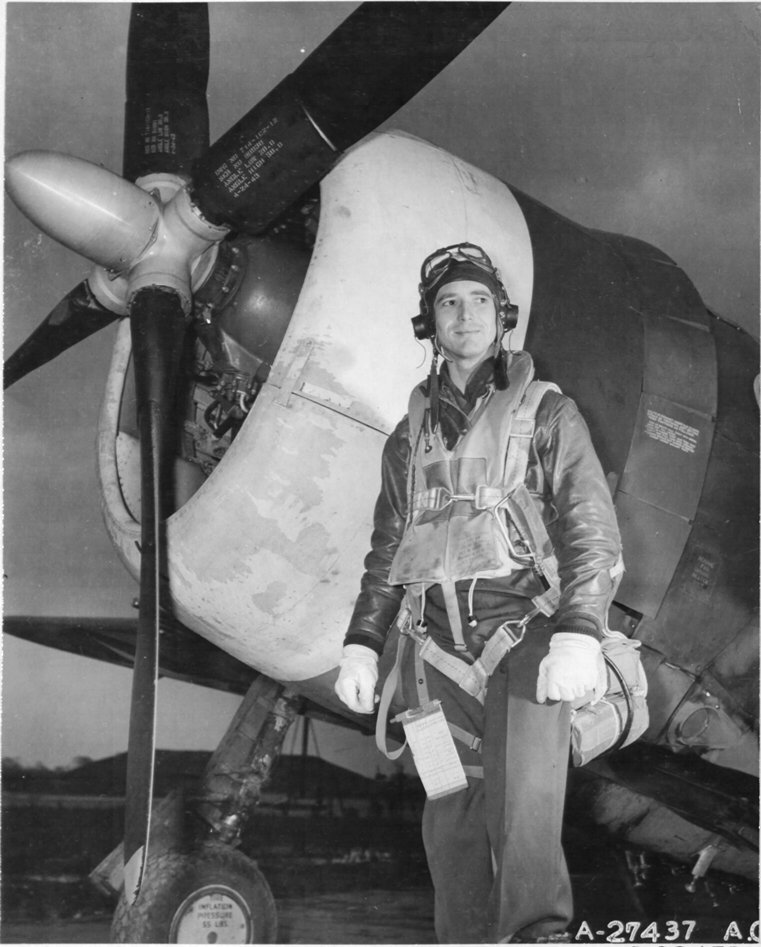
- Major Walter C Beckham with his P-47D "Little Demon II"
- Born: May 12, 1916; Paxton, Florida
- Died: May 31, 1996 (aged 80); Albuquerque, New Mexico
- Military career
- Allegiance: United States of America
- Branch: United States Army Air Forces; United States Air Force
- Service years: 1941–1969
- Rank: Colonel
- Service number: O-430771
- Units: 353rd Fighter Group; Air Force Weapons Laboratory
- Conflicts: World War II
- Awards: Distinguished Service Cross; Silver Star (4); Legion of Merit; Distinguished Flying Cross (5); Air Medal (6)
- Other work: Civilian nuclear scientist

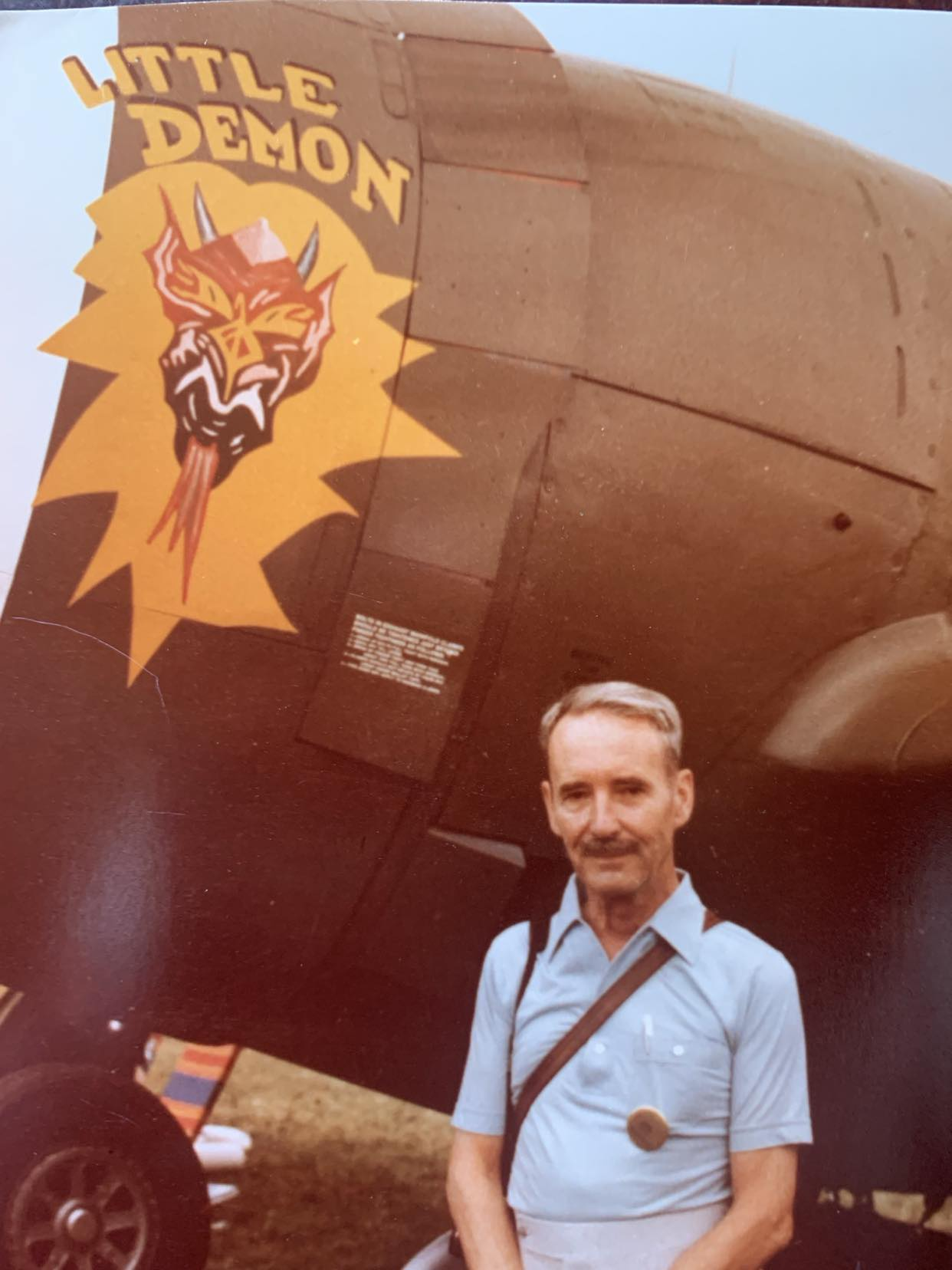
Walter Carl Beckham - with P47 painted to replicate his WW2 Fighter

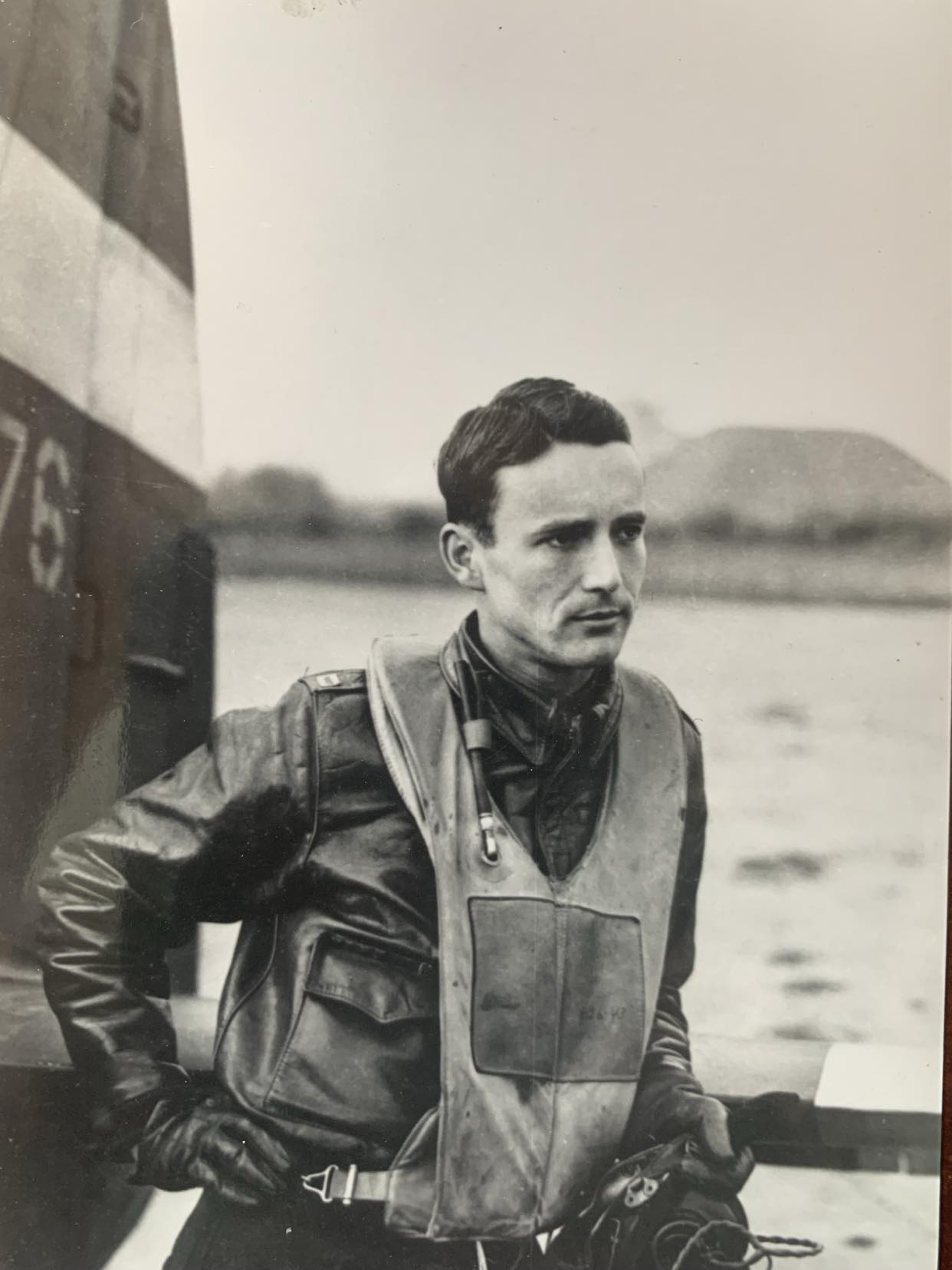
Walter Carl Beckham - England 1944

Walter Carl Beckham (May 16, 1916 – May 31, 1996) was a United States Army Air Forces officer during World War II and an American ace credited with 18 air-to-air victories. He remained in the Air Force after the war, obtained a Ph.D. in physics and was a nuclear weapons scientist.

== Early life ==
Beckham was born on May 12, 1916, in Paxton, Florida.

== Military career ==
Beckham became a United States Army Air Corps cadet in early 1941, Upon graduation from Aviation Cadet Class 41I(SE) in December, he was commissioned a second lieutenant and assigned to the Panama Canal Zone and Ecuador. After his return to the US, he was promoted to captain and was assigned to the 351st Fighter Squadron of the 353rd Fighter Group, flying Republic P-47 Thunderbolts.

=== World War II ===
In mid-1943, the 353rd FG was initially stationed at RAF Goxhill in Lincolnshire, England, before moving to RAF Metfield in Suffolk, England in August 1943.

After switching its base to Metfield, the 353rd FG flew its first combat mission. In late September, Beckham scored his first kill, an Fw 190 over Nantes, France. Credited with a second kill, a Bf 109 on October 6, and then on October 10 he became a flying ace by destroying three twin-engined Messerschmitt Bf 110s.

During the winter of 1943-44, his score mounted, with victories frequently coming in pairs. By mid-February, Beckham had 18 victories, which at that time, made him the top scoring ace of the Eighth Air Force. On February 22, while on his 57th combat mission, he was hit by flak over Ostheim, Germany and bailed out of his P-47D successfully near Bergen-Neukirchen, but was captured and remained a Prisoner of War until he was released during April 1945.

=== Post war ===
After his release in April 1945, Beckham was promoted to lieutenant colonel and stayed with the United States Air Force. He earned a PhD in physics in 1962 and joined the Air Force Weapons Laboratory at Kirtland Air Force Base as chief scientist, working on nuclear weapons. First Chief Scientist of the United States Air Force. Mentored by Edward Teller. Researcher at Lawrence Livermore Laboratories. Instructor at University of UC Berkeley. Beckham remained active in this field until his retirement on 1969 as colonel in the USAF.

== Later life ==
Beckham continued his career as nuclear scientist in civilian life until he retired in Albuquerque, New Mexico. Beckham died in Albuquerque on May 31, 1996.

== Awards and decorations ==
Beckham earned many decorations, including:

US Air Force Command Pilot Badge

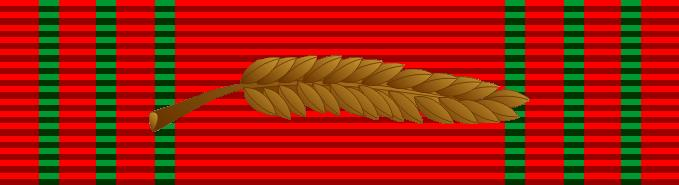
Distinguished Service Cross
Silver Star with three bronze oak leaf clusters
Legion of Merit
Distinguished Flying Cross with four bronze oak leaf clusters
Air Medal with silver oak leaf cluster
Air Force Outstanding Unit Award with bronze oak leaf cluster
Prisoner of War Medal
American Defense Service Medal
American Campaign Medal
European-African-Middle Eastern Campaign Medal with bronze campaign star
World War II Victory Medal
National Defense Service Medal with bronze service star
Air Force Longevity Service Award with silver and bronze oak leaf clusters
Small Arms Expert Marksmanship Ribbon
Croix de Guerre, with Palm (Belgium)

=== Distinguished Service Cross citation ===

Beckham, Walter C.
Captain (Air Corps), U.S. Army Air Forces
351st Fighter Squadron, 353rd Fighter Group, 8th Air Force
Date of Action: October 10, 1943

Citation:

For extraordinary heroism in connection with military operations against an armed enemy while serving as Pilot of a P-47 Fighter Airplane in the 351st Fighter Squadron, 353d Fighter Group, Eighth Air Force, in action over enemy occupied Europe on 10 October 1943, while serving as a flight leader on a mission escorting withdrawing bombers. Major Beckham destroyed at unfavorable altitude two enemy aircraft as a result of his aggressiveness and the viciousness of his attacks. Though almost out of ammunition and with a dwindling fuel supply, he voluntarily engaged two additional aircraft. One of the planes he destroyed with the last of his ammunition and the other he drove from the combat area by simulated attack. The courage and aggressiveness of Major Beckham have been an inspiration to his fellow pilots and reflect the highest credit upon himself and the Armed Forces of the United States.

== See also ==
- Kirtland Air Force Base
- Edward Teller
