= Będlino =

- Village
- Location within Poland
- Coordinates: 53°26′N 16°9′E
- Country: Poland
- Voivodeship: West Pomeranian
- County: Drawsko
- Gmina: Wierzchowo
- Population: 197

Będlino [bɛnˈdlinɔ] is a village in the administrative district of Gmina Wierzchowo, within Drawsko County, West Pomeranian Voivodeship, in north-western Poland. It lies approximately 5 km (3 mi) south-east of Wierzchowo, 26 km (16 mi) south-east of Drawsko Pomorskie, and 104 km (65 mi) east of the regional capital Szczecin.

The village has a population of 197.

== Notable residents ==
- Siegfried Engfer (1915-1946), Luftwaffe pilot
