= Loren G. McCollom =

United States Air Force general (1914–1982)

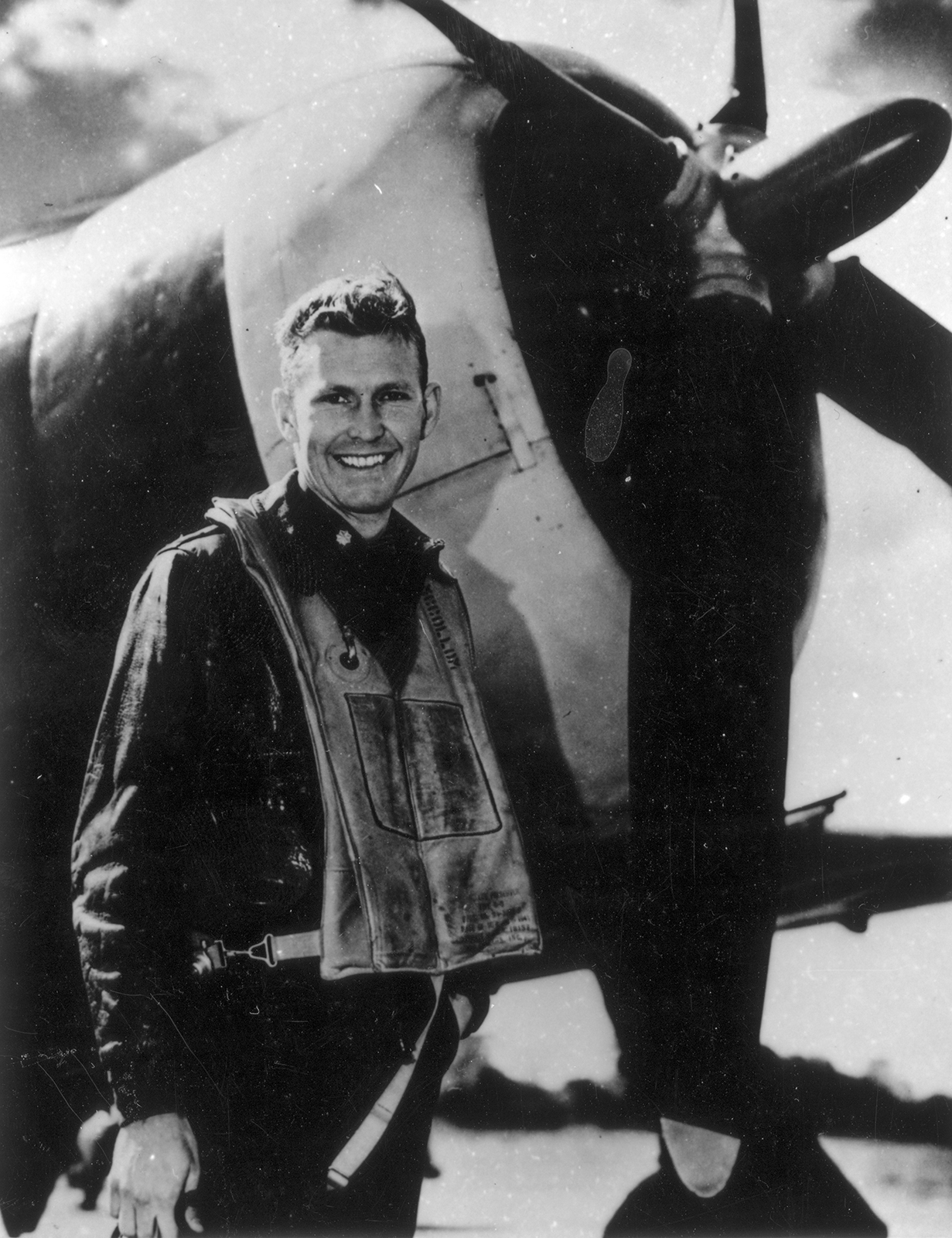
- Lieutenant Colonel Loren G. McCollom with his P-47 Thunderbolt
- Born: April 15, 1914; Ritzville, Washington, US
- Died: May 15, 1982 (aged 68); Melbourne Beach, Florida
- Military career
- Branch: United States Army Air Forces; United States Air Force
- Service years: 1939–1968
- Nickname: Mac
- Commands: 61st Fighter Squadron; 353rd Fighter Group; 67th Tactical Reconnaissance Group
- Awards: Silver Star; Legion of Merit; Distinguished Flying Cross; Bronze Star; Air Medal

Loren G. McCollom (April 15, 1915 – May 15, 1982) was a fighter pilot during World War II and a major general in the United States Air Force. He flew a P-47 Thunderbolt based in England and was shot down over France in November 1943 and was a prisoner of war. He was commander of the 67th Tactical Reconnaissance Group during the Korean War.

== Early life and education ==
Loren G. McCollom was born in Ritzville, Washington in 1914 and graduated from Ritzville High School in 1932. He attended Washington State College in Pullman and graduated in 1937.

McCollom joined the United States Army Air Corps in 1939 was commissioned as a reserve second lieutenant in 1940. His first assignment was aircraft commander in the 8th Pursuit Group at Langley Field, Virginia.

== World War II ==
McCollom was assigned command of the 61st Fighter Squadron, 56th Fighter Group in 1942. In August 1943 he assumed command of the 353rd Fighter Group in England and was promoted to lieutenant colonel. On 17 August during the Schweinfurt–Regensburg mission, McCollom shot down Heinz Kemethmüller of Jagdgeschwader 26 who bailed out injured.

On 25 November 1943 McCollom P-47D Thunderbolt was hit by flak while strafing the Ft. Rouge Aerodrome, Saint-Omer, France. He survived but was severely burned and spent the remainder of the war as a POW at Stalag Luft I.

== Korea ==
After World War II, McCollom was deputy commander of the 1st Fighter Group at March Air Force Base, in California. He was promoted to colonel and took command of the 67th Tactical Reconnaissance Group.

He was transferred to Headquarters Tactical Air Command at Langley Air Force Base in Virginia, Va. He command the 67th Tactical Reconnaissance Wing in Korea in 1952 and spent a year in Tokyo, at the Far East Air Forces headquarters.

== Cold War era ==
After returning from the Asia, McCollom was assigned to Headquarters Air Defense Command in Colorado Springs, Colorado.

In June 1958, he was transferred to Hanscom Air Force Base in Massachusetts. He was promoted to brigadier general in November 1958.

== Military decorations ==
McCollom's decorations include a Silver Star with oak leaf cluster, Legion of Merit, Distinguished Flying Cross, Bronze Star, Air Medal with three oak leaf clusters, Commendation Ribbon, Purple Heart and Air Force Outstanding Unit Award.

== See also ==
- Eighth Air Force
