= Siegfried Engfer =

German Luftwaffe fighter pilot

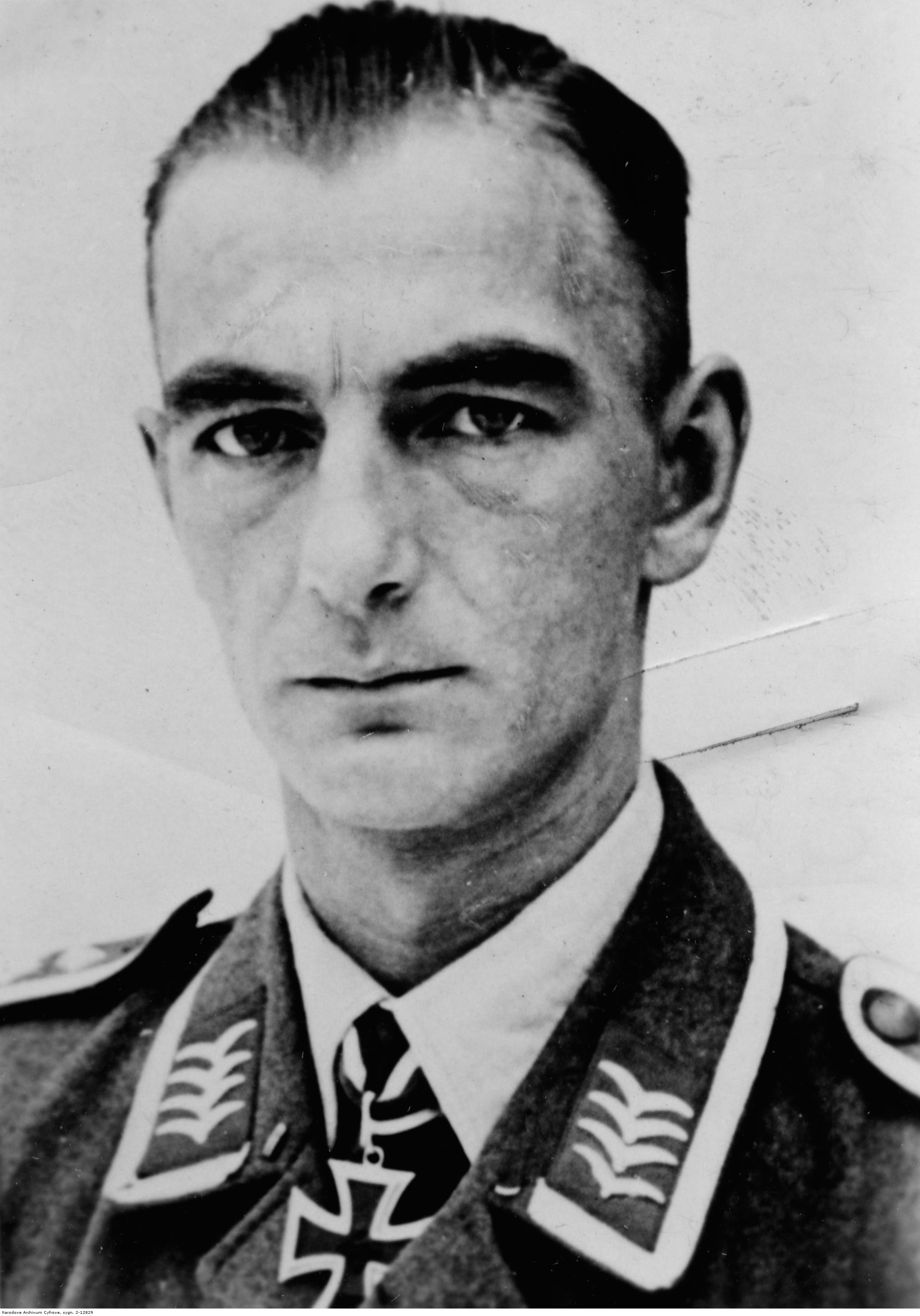
- Born: 27 April 1915; Neuhof, Pomerania, German Empire
- Died: April 1946 (age 30–31) (disappeared); Germany
- Military career
- Allegiance: Nazi Germany
- Branch: Army (1935–37); Luftwaffe (1937–45)
- Service years: 1935–45
- Rank: Oberleutnant (first lieutenant)
- Unit: JG 3
- Conflicts: World War II: Eastern Front
- Awards: Knight's Cross of the Iron Cross

Siegfried Engfer (27 April 1915 – missing April 1946) was a German Luftwaffe fighter pilot during World War II and a recipient of the Knight's Cross of the Iron Cross of Nazi Germany. He was credited with 58 victories, in over 348 missions.

== Career ==
Engfer was born on 27 April 1915 in Neuhof, present-day Będlino, in the Province of Pomerania within the German Empire. On 4 June 1941, Engfer was injured during a takeoff accident in his Messerschmitt Bf 109 F-2 (Werknummer 8247—factory number) at the airfield in Norrent-Fontes.

=== Eastern Front ===
The Wehrmacht launched Operation Barbarossa, the invasion of the Soviet Union, on 22 June 1941. III. Gruppe supported Army Group South in its strategic goal towards the heavily populated and agricultural heartland of Ukraine, taking Kiev before continuing eastward over the steppes of southern USSR to the Volga with the aim of controlling the oil-rich Caucasus.

Both Engfer and Feldwebel Heinz Kemethmüller from 8. Staffel of JG 3 claimed their 50th aerial victories on 18 September 1942. Consequently, both pilots were awarded the Knight's Cross of the Iron Cross (Ritterkreuz des Eisernen Kreuzes) on 2 October 1942. On 6 November, III. Gruppe was withdrawn from the Eastern Front and sent to Mannheim-Sandhofen Airfield for a period of rest and replenishment. The first elements of the Gruppe arrived by train in Mannheim on 8 December, the transfer was completed a week later. There, the personnel was sent on home leave. Following the death of Generaloberst Ernst Udet, Reichsmarschall Hermann Göring ordered JG 3 to be given the honorary name "Udet" on 1 December. The Gruppe received a full complement of 41 Messerschmitt Bf 109 F-4 aircraft and on 6 January 1942 was ordered to relocated to Sicily. On 13 January, 7. Staffel and elements of 8. and 9. Staffel boarded a train to Bari in southern Italy while the rest of III. Gruppe headed for Sciacca, Sicily. The relocation progressed until 26 January when new orders were received, ordering the Gruppe to return to Germany. At Jesau near Königsberg, present-day Kaliningrad in Russia, III. Gruppe began preparations for redeployment to the Eastern Front. On 28 May 1943, Engfer was posted to Ergänzungs-Jagdgruppe Ost (Supplementary Fighter Group, East), a specialized training unit for new fighter pilots destined for the Eastern Front, as an instructor. Shortly after, he fell seriously ill and was infected with Tuberculosis.

Engfer went missing on a train journey from Vienna to Munich in April 1946. Alternatively, according to Mathews and Foreman, he may have been killed in a car accident.

== Summary of career ==
=== Aerial victory claims ===
According to US historian David T. Zabecki, Engfer was credited with 58 aerial victories. Mathews and Foreman, authors of Luftwaffe Aces — Biographies and Victory Claims, researched the German Federal Archives and found documentation for 58 aerial victory claims, all of which confirmed and claimed on the Eastern Front.

Chronicle of aerial victories
This and the ! (exclamation mark) indicates those aerial victories listed by Mathews and Foreman and by Prien, Stemmer, Rodeike and Bock. This and the # (hash mark) indicates those aerial victories listed in the 1996 book by Prien and Stemmer. This and the ? (question mark) indicates information discrepancies listed by Prien, Stemmer, Rodeike, Bock, Mathews and Foreman.
Claim!	Claim#	Date	Time	Type	Location	Claim!	Claim#	Date	Time	Type	Location
– 9. Staffel of Jagdgeschwader 3 – Operation Barbarossa — 22 June – 5 December 1941
1	1	6 July 1941	19:40	V-11 (Il-2)							
– 9. Staffel of Jagdgeschwader 3 "Udet" – Eastern Front – 10 February 1942 – 14 April 1942
2	2	12 March 1942	17:50	R-5							
– 9. Staffel of Jagdgeschwader 3 "Udet" – Eastern Front – 19 May 1942 – March 1943
3	3	20 May 1942	04:50	Il-2	west of Wesseloje	33		7 September 1942	16:55	La-5	1 km (0.62 mi) southwest of Vladimirovka
	4	27 May 1942	16:02	unknown		34		7 September 1942	16:57	Il-2	1 km (0.62 mi) west of Orchisodschi
4	5	29 May 1942	18:41	R-10 (Seversky)		35	30	8 September 1942	06:33	La-5? (Note: According to the 1996 book by Prien and Stemmer claimed as an unknown aircraft type.)	Kotluban railway station
5		30 June 1942	10:06	MiG-1	southeast of Kshen		31	8 September 1942	10:20	unknown	
6	6	10 July 1942	04:05	MiG-1	Voronezh		32	8 September 1942	10:30	unknown	
7	7	16 July 1942	13:10	R-5		36		8 September 1942	16:48	P-40	2 km (1.2 mi) northeast of Kotluban train station
8	8	17 July 1942	05:50	MiG-1			33	8 September 1942	16:55	unknown	
9	9	22 July 1942	14:58	Il-2			34	9 September 1942	16:45	unknown	
10	10	24 July 1942	08:50	Il-2		37	35	9 September 1942	16:56	Il-2?	15 km (9.3 mi) north-northeast of Stalingrad
11	11	26 July 1942	12:27	Il-2	Kalach	38		9 September 1942	16:58	Il-2	20 km (12 mi) northeast of Stalingrad
12	12	26 July 1942	12:34	Il-2	Kalach		36	10 September 1942	06:18	unknown	
13	13	26 July 1942	18:13	MiG-1	Kalach		37	10 September 1942	06:21	unknown	
14	14	28 July 1942	09:55	Il-2	northwest of Kalach	39		10 September 1942	11:18	MiG-1	Stalingrad
15		9 August 1942	06:01	Su-2 (Seversky)	southeast of Kalach	40	38	10 September 1942	17:10	MiG-1?	15 km (9.3 mi) northeast of Stalingrad
16		9 August 1942	06:03	LaGG-3	northwest of Stalingrad	41	39	11 September 1942	05:55	Pe-2?	10 km (6.2 mi) northeast of Katschalino
17		9 August 1942	18:05	LaGG-3	southeast of Kalach	42		11 September 1942	13:56	Il-2	western edge of Stalingrad
18		11 August 1942	17:05	LaGG-3	southwest of Stalingrad	43		12 September 1942	09:22	Il-2	20 km (12 mi) north of Stalingrad
19		17 August 1942	09:35	LaGG-3	north of Pasow		40	12 September 1942	14:10	unknown	
20		18 August 1942	17:20	LaGG-3	east of Akatow	44		12 September 1942	15:56	Il-2	east of Stalingrad
21		19 August 1942	11:35	LaGG-3? (Note: According to Mathews and Foreman claimed as a Lavochkin La-5.)	south of Prudkij	45		13 September 1942	13:11	Il-2	Olchowatka train station
22		19 August 1942	11:44	LaGG-3?	north of Kaschinka	46	41	13 September 1942	16:07	Il-2?	10 km (6.2 mi) northeast of Stalingrad
	15	19 August 1942	17:55	unknown		47	42	13 September 1942	16:14	Il-2?	Stalingrad
	16	19 August 1942	17:56	unknown			43	14 September 1942	16:25	unknown	
23	17	21 August 1942	05:48	Pe-2?	northeast of Ssoldatskaja	48		14 September 1942	16:27	Il-2	2 km (1.2 mi) southeast of Stalingrad
24		23 August 1942	12:55	I-180 (Yak-7)	Akhtuba		44	14 September 1942	16:28	unknown	
25	18	24 August 1942	11:55	LaGG-3?	Stalingrad	49		14 September 1942	16:29	Il-2	central Stalingrad
	19	24 August 1942	11:56	unknown			45	15 September 1942	07:10	unknown	
	20	27 August 1942	05:25	unknown			46	16 September 1942	08:10	Il-2	
26		27 August 1942	07:40	LaGG-3	northwest of Leninsk		47	16 September 1942	08:11	Il-2	
27		28 August 1942	11:00	LaGG-3	north-northwest of Stalingrad		48	16 September 1942	16:20	Il-2	
	21	29 August 1942	06:05	unknown		50		15 September 1942	16:12? (Note: According to Mathews and Foreman claimed at 16:13.)	Il-2	3 km (1.9 mi) west of Stalingrad
28		31 August 1942	08:58	Yak-1	Finzuta	51	49	18 September 1942	05:45	Il-2	5 km (3.1 mi) northeast of Opotschka
29		31 August 1942	09:05	Yak-1	southeast of Sarepta		50	18 September 1942	05:55	Il-2	
	22	31 August 1942	10:45	unknown			51	18 September 1942	06:03	Il-2	
	23	2 September 1942	06:38	unknown		52		18 September 1942	17:00	Il-2	western edge of Stalingrad
30		2 September 1942	09:45	Pe-2	3 km (1.9 mi) north of Karpatsch		52	18 September 1942	05:55	MiG-1	
	24	2 September 1942	17:10	unknown			53	20 September 1942	09:15	unknown	
31		3 September 1942	05:25	Il-2	east of Stalingrad		54	23 September 1942	10:40	unknown	
	25	3 September 1942	05:26	unknown		53		24 September 1942	12:49	Il-2	5 km (3.1 mi) north of Chalshuta
	26	5 September 1942	06:07	unknown			55	27 September 1942	16:05	unknown	
32	27	6 September 1942	17:03	LaGG-3?	30 km (19 mi) north-northwest of Stalingrad		56	12 February 1943	—	unknown	
	28	7 September 1942	16:41	unknown			57	28 February 1943	11:30	unknown	
	29	7 September 1942	16:42	unknown			58	2 March 1943	10:37	unknown	

=== Awards ===
- Iron Cross (1939) 2nd and 1st Class
- Honor Goblet of the Luftwaffe on 21 September 1942 as Feldwebel and pilot
- Knight's Cross of the Iron Cross on 2 October 1942 as Feldwebel and pilot in the III./Jagdgeschwader 3 "Udet"

== See also ==
- List of people who disappeared
