= Kuzmyn =

Rural locality in Khmelnitskyi Oblast, Ukraine

Coordinates: 49°42′N 27°05′E

Kuzmin (Ukrainian: Кузьмин) is a village (selo) in central Ukraine. It is located in Khmelnytskyi Raion (district) of Khmelnytskyi Oblast (province). Kuzmyn belongs to Shchyborivka rural hromada, one of the hromadas of Ukraine.

Until 18 July 2020, Kuzmyn was the administrative center of Krasyliv Raion. The raion was abolished in July 2020 as part of the administrative reform of Ukraine, which reduced the number of raions in Khmelnytskyi Oblast to three. The area of Krasyliv Raion was merged into Khmelnytskyi Raion.

== Administration ==
Time	Name	District	Province	Country
Before World War I (c. 1900):	Kuz'min	Starokonstantinov	Volhynian Governorate	Russian Empire
Between the wars (c. 1930):	Kuz'min		Kamianets-Podilskyi Oblast	USSR
After World War II (c. 1950):	Kuz'min	Kamianets-Podilskyi Raion	Khmelnytskyi Oblast	USSR
Today (c. 2000):	Kuzmin		Khmelnytskyi Oblast	Ukraine
