= Glenn E. Duncan =

American World War II flying ace

Glenn Emile Duncan
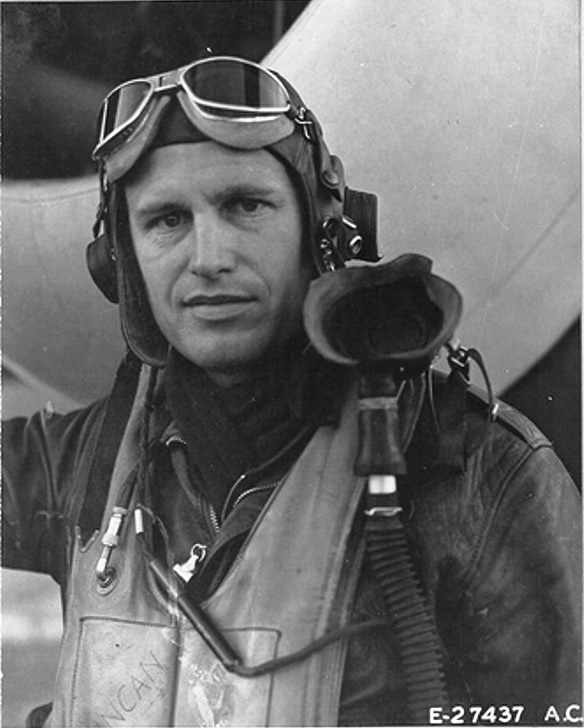
- Col. Glenn Duncan in 1944
- Born: May 12, 1918; Bering, Texas
- Died: July 14, 1998 (aged 80)
- Burial place: Arlington National Cemetery
- Military career
- Allegiance: United States of America
- Branch: United States Air Force; United States Army Air Forces; United States Army Air Corps
- Service years: 1940 – 1970
- Rank: Colonel
- Unit: 353rd Fighter Group (USAAF)
- Commands: 353rd Fighter Group; 1st Fighter Wing; Stewart Air Force Base
- Conflicts: World War II; Korean War
- Awards: Distinguished Service Cross; Silver Star; Distinguished Flying Cross (8); Air Medal (4)

Glenn Emile Duncan (May 12, 1918 – July 14, 1998) was a career officer in the United States Air Force and one of the leading aces of Eighth Air Force in World War II in Europe and the top ace of the 353rd Fighter Group. Duncan was credited with 19.5 victories, one probable victory, and seven damaged German aircraft. He also destroyed at least nine enemy aircraft on the ground, while flying P-47 Thunderbolts with the 353rd Fighter Group. He flew combat missions in the P-47 Thunderbolts and P-51 Mustangs in Europe.

== Early life ==
Duncan was born on May 19, 1918, in Bering, Texas.

== Military career ==
He enlisted in the Aviation Cadet Program of the U.S. Army Air Corps on February 9, 1940, and was commissioned a 2nd Lieutenant and awarded his pilot wings at Kelly Field, Texas, on October 5, 1940.

=== World War II ===
Duncan served as an instructor pilot for a year and then served in Panama from December 1941 to January 1943, before completing P-47 Thunderbolt training and being assigned first to the 361st Fighter Group, and then to the 353rd Fighter Group in England in March 1943.

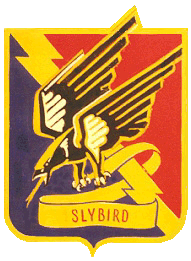
353rd Fighter Group

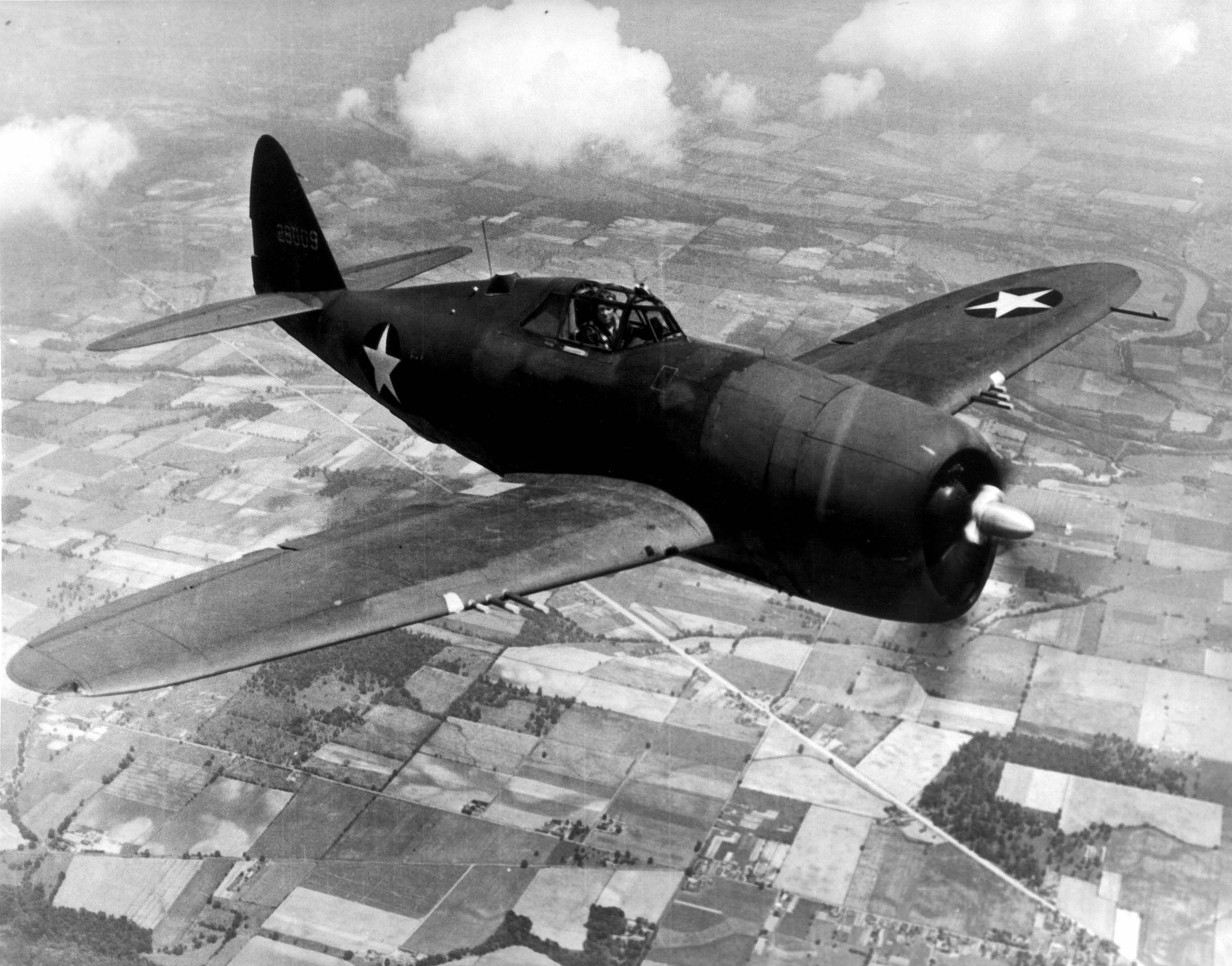
Republic P-47D Thunderbolt

In mid-1943, the 353rd FG was initially stationed at RAF Goxhill in Lincolnshire, England, before moving to RAF Metfield in Suffolk, England in August 1943. After switching its base to Metfield, the 353rd FG flew its first combat mission. On September 23, 1943, Duncan scored his first victory, a Fw 190 over Nantes. He began flying frequent escort missions and destroyed a Fw 190 and Bf 109 on November 11, for which he received the Distinguished Service Cross. He was made full Colonel in November 1944.

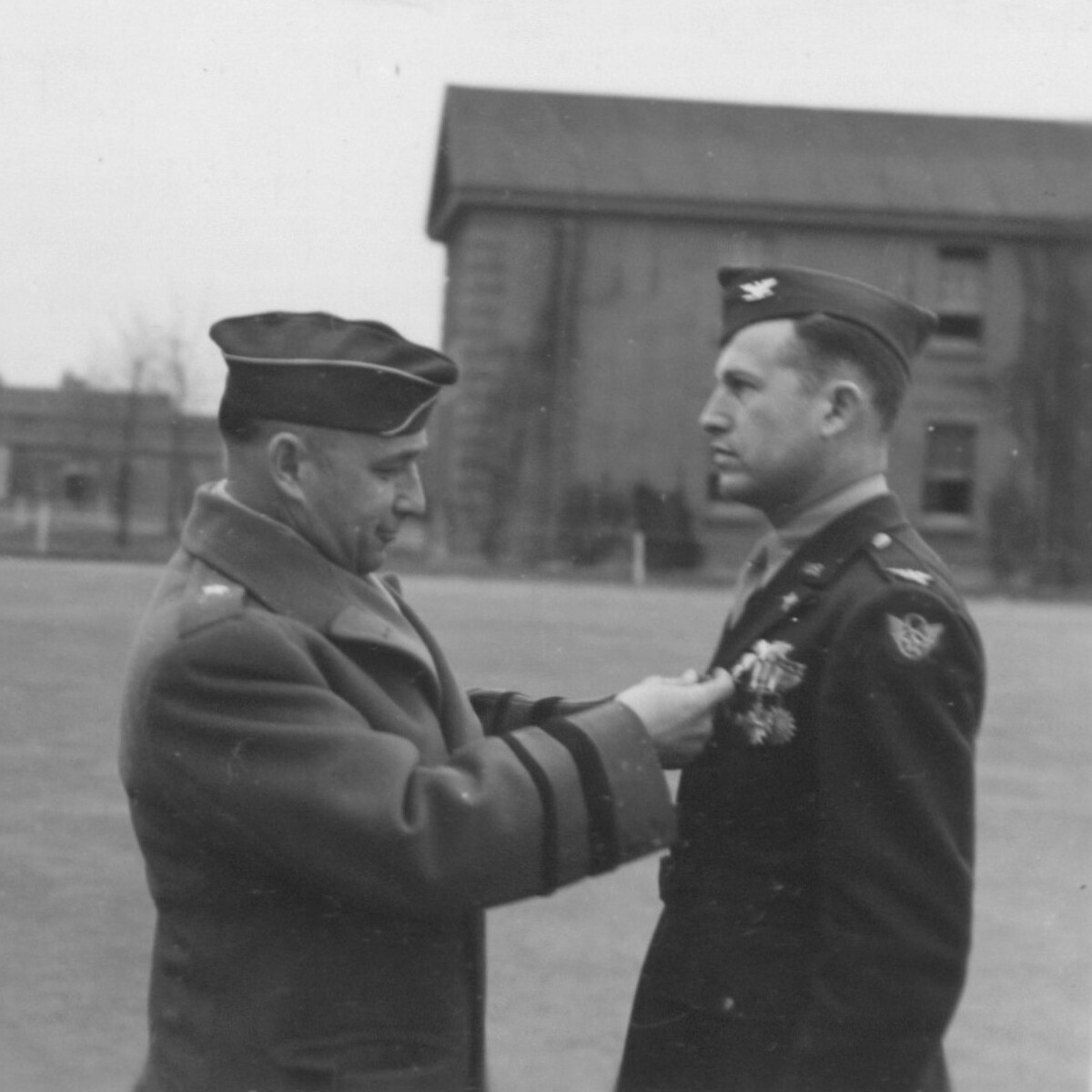
Duncan receives the Distinguished Service Cross from Brig. Gen. Murray C. Woodbury

Duncan became a flying ace, when he destroyed a Fw 190 over Rastede on December 20, his fifth aerial victory. During a bomber escort near Ans, Belgium on 20 January 1944, his flight encountered four twin-engined Messerschmitt Bf 110s. In the dogfight, he destroyed two Bf 110s. In April 1944, the 353rd FG moved to their new base in RAF Raydon.

By June 7, 1944, he had accumulated 15½ kills. On the 12th June, he shot down three Bf-109s. He claimed his 19th and last aerial victory on July 5, when he shot down a Bf 109 over Pont-Audemer.

On July 7, 1944, while leading an aerial attack on an aerodrome at Wesendorf, his P-47 was hit by anti-aircraft fire. His crippled P-47 continued to fly on until he belly landed near Nienburg. As he left his aircraft, he tossed a grenade into it to ensure that it won't fall into the German hands, resulting in the destruction of the aircraft.

He then evaded capture on foot and walked towards Netherlands. He joined the Dutch resistance, before being liberated by the Allied forces 10 months later, in April 1945.

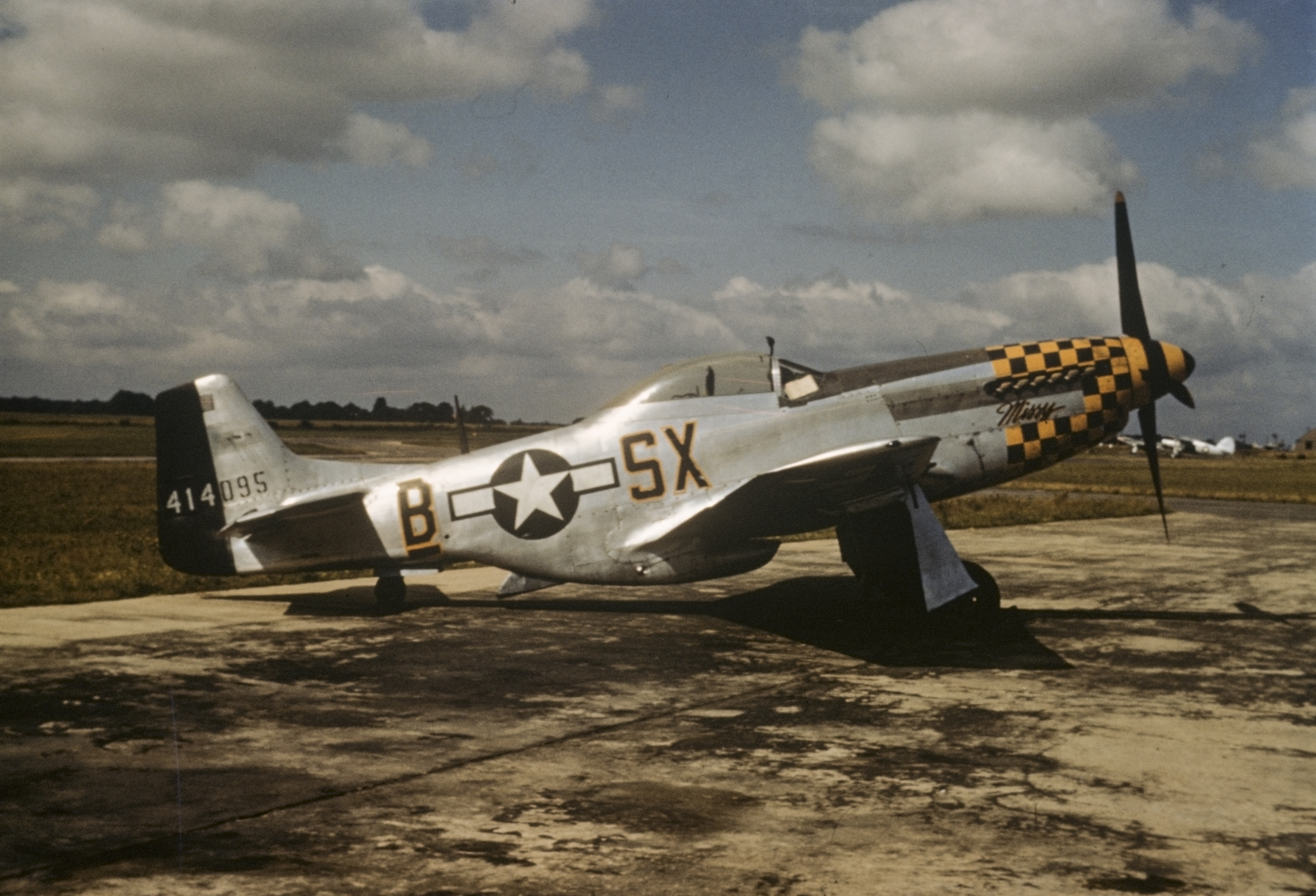
P-51 Mustang of the 353rd Fighter Group

Duncan then rejoined the 353rd Fighter Group as its commanding officer, which was now equipped with the P-51 Mustang. He served until October 1945, when he returned to the U.S. He then returned to Germany and served on occupation duty from January to August 1946.

During World War II, Duncan was credited with destroying 19.5 enemy aircraft in the air, 1 probable kill, and 7 damaged. He was also credited with destroying 9 enemy aircraft on the ground while strafing enemy airfields.

During his time with the 353rd FG, he flew aircraft bearing the name "Dove of Peace", with code LH-X. There were P-47s and P-51 with this title in the 353rd Fighter Group at that time.

=== Post war ===
He then served as an instructor with the Air National Guard until June 1949, when he became a White House Liaison Officer. Duncan served at the White House and with Headquarters U.S. Air Force in the Pentagon until May 1953, when he was transferred to Japan to serve as Deputy Commander of the 39th Air Division at Misawa Air Base, from August 1953 to July 1956.

His next assignment was as Commander of the 1st Fighter Wing at Selfridge Air Force Base, Michigan, from September 1956 to August 1959, before attending the Industrial College of the Armed Forces from August 1959 to July 1960. Duncan next served on the staff of Headquarters Air Defense Command at Ent Air Force Base, Colorado, from July 1960 to September 1965, followed by service as Deputy Commander of the 314th Air Division at Osan Air Base, South Korea, from September 1965 to June 1966.

He served as Base Commander of Stewart Air Force Base, New York, from August 1966 to August 1969, and then as Special Assistant to the Vice Commander of 1st Air Force at Stewart AFB, from August 1969 until his retirement from the Air Force on February 1, 1970.

== Later life ==
Duncan died on July 14, 1998, and was buried at Arlington National Cemetery.

== Awards and decorations ==
Glenn Duncan's ribbons, including retroactive awards:-

Command pilot badge

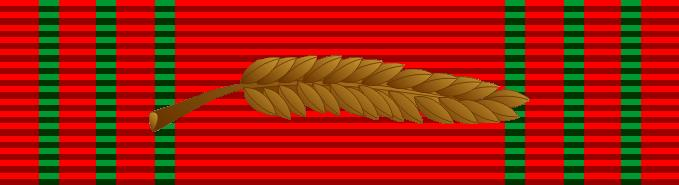
Distinguished Service Cross
Silver Star
Distinguished Flying Cross with one silver and two bronze oak leaf clusters
Air Medal with three bronze oak leaf clusters
Air Force Commendation Medal with bronze oak leaf cluster
Army Commendation Medal
Air Force Outstanding Unit Award
American Defense Service Medal
American Campaign Medal
European-African-Middle Eastern Campaign Medal with four bronze campaign stars
World War II Victory Medal
Army of Occupation Medal
National Defense Service Medal with one bronze service star
Korean Service Medal
Korea Defense Service Medal
Air Force Longevity Service Award with silver and bronze oak leaf cluster
Small Arms Expert Marksmanship Ribbon
Distinguished Flying Cross (United Kingdom)
Croix de Guerre with Palm (France)
Croix de Guerre with Palm (Belgium)
United Nations Service Medal for Korea
Korean War Service Medal

=== Distinguished Service Cross citation ===
Duncan, Glenn E.
Lieutenant Colonel (then Major), U.S Army Air Forces
353rd Fighter Group, 8th Air Force
Date of Action: November 11, 1943
Headquarters, European Theater of Operations, U.S. Army, General Orders No. 2 (January 10, 1944)

Citation:

The President of the United States of America, authorized by Act of Congress, July 9, 1918, takes pleasure in presenting the Distinguished Service Cross to Lieutenant Colonel (Air Corps), [then Major] Glenn Emile Duncan, United States Army Air Forces, for extraordinary heroism in connection with military operations against an armed enemy while serving as Pilot of a P-47 Fighter Airplane in the 353d Fighter Group, EIGHTH Air Force, in aerial combat against enemy forces over enemy-occupied Europe while leading a group of fighter aircraft on 11 November 1943. As a result of leading a squadron of his group against a large number of enemy aircraft, Lieutenant Colonel Duncan became separated from his group. He observed enemy aircraft attacking bombers and, though at an unfavorable altitude and in the face of overwhelming odds, Lieutenant Colonel Duncan vigorously attacked the enemy aircraft, destroying one and dispersing the remainder. While proceeding to his home base, he observed four enemy aircraft attacking a straggling Fortress. Although his gas supply was dangerously low, he engaged the enemy and dispersed them, thereby saving the Fortress and its crew. The action of Lieutenant Colonel Duncan reflect the highest credit upon himself and the armed forces of the United States.
