= 353rd Fighter Group =

WW2 US Army Air Forces unit

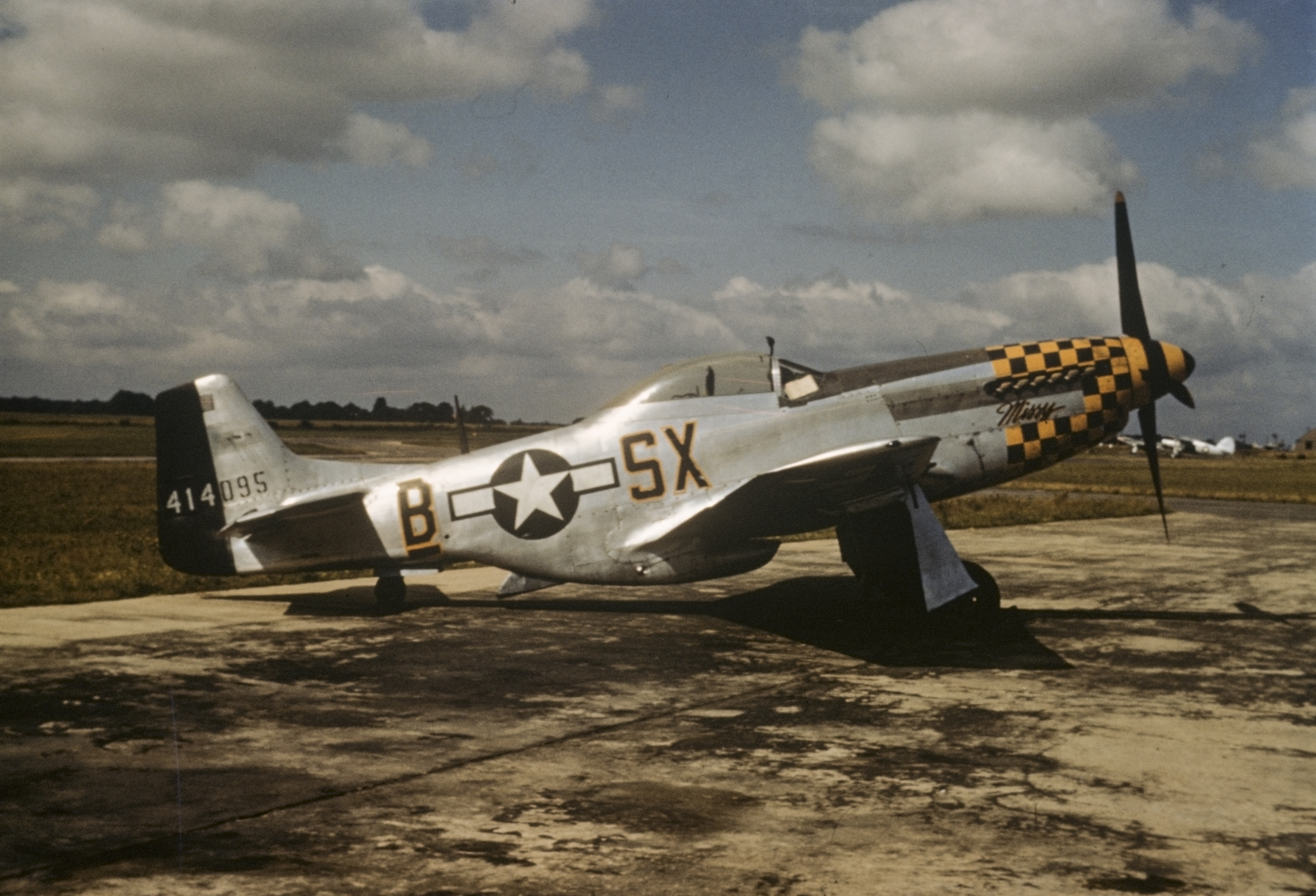
- P-51 Mustang of the 353rd Fighter Group
- Active: 1942–1945
- Country: United States
- Branch: United States Army Air Forces
- Role: Fighter
- Part of: VIII Fighter Command
- Garrison/HQ: European Theatre of World War II
- Nickname(s): Slybird Group
- Colors: Yellow/black checkered cowl

Insignia
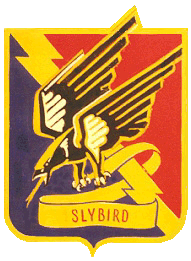
- 4th Fighter Group Emblem
- 350th Fighter Squadron: LH
- 351st Fighter Squadron: YJ
- 352nd Fighter Squadron: SX

Aircraft flown
- Fighter: P-40 Warhawk, 1942–1943; P-47 Thunderbolt 1943–1944; P-51 Mustang 1944–1945

The 353rd Fighter Group, nicknamed the Slybird Group, was a fighter group of the United States Army Air Forces during World War II. The group was stationed in England and comprised the 350th, 351st, and 352nd Fighter Squadrons. It pioneered the P-47 dive-bombing and ground attack technique adopted by both Eighth and Ninth Air Forces. The group flew 447 combat missions and claimed 330 air and 414 ground aircraft destroyed. Group markings were black, yellow, black, yellow spinners, with a 48-inch black and yellow checker band around the cowling to the end of the exhaust stubs.

== Organization and training ==
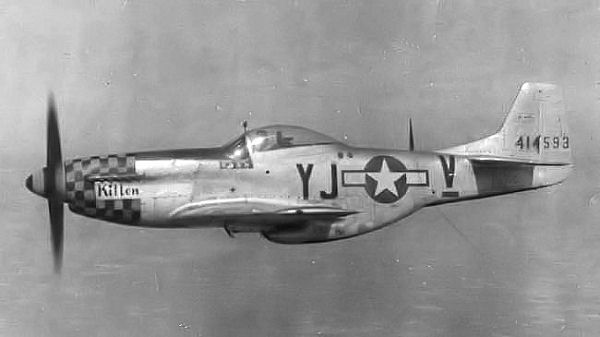
North American P-51D-10-NA Mustang Serial 44-14593 (VJ-V) "Kitten", flown by Lt. John Gaglan of the 351st Fighter Squadron.

The 353rd Fighter Group was constituted on 29 Sep 1942 and activated on 1 Oct 1942. The group trained for duty overseas with P-40s at Baltimore Army Airfield from October 1942 to May 1943.

== European Theatre ==
The 353rd Fighter Group moved to England in June 1943 and was assigned to the 66th Fighter Wing of the VIII Fighter Command at Sawston Hall, Cambridge. The group was at RAF Goxhill from June to August 1943 then moved to RAF Metfield in August 1943.

Equipped with P-47D Thunderbolts, operations commenced on 12 August 1943. It was the fourth P-47 unit to join the Eighth Air Force. From Metfield the 353rd flew numerous counter-air missions and provided escort for bombers that attacked targets in western Europe, made counter-air sweeps over France and the Low Countries, and dive-bombed targets in France.

=== Battle of Normandy ===
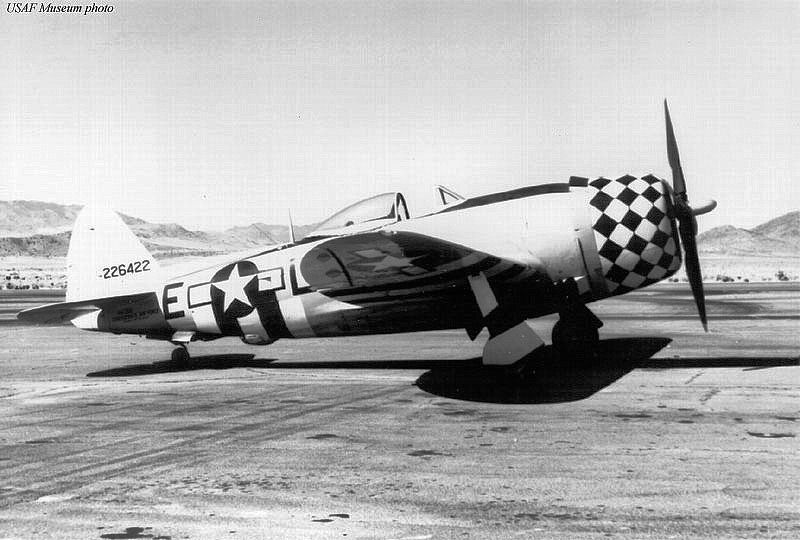
Republic P-47D-25-RE Thunderbolt 42-26422 (LH-E) of the 350th Fighter Squadron

The group moved to RAF Raydon in April 1944.

During the Battle of Normandy, the 353rd supported the breakthrough at Saint-Lô in July 1944.

=== Market Garden ===
The group contributed to the airborne attack on Holland by protecting bombers and troop carriers and by strafing and dive-bombing ground targets during the period of 17–23 September 1944. The group received the Distinguished Unit Citation for this effort.

In October 1944, the group converted to P-51 Mustang aircraft.

=== Battle of the Bulge ===
The group continued its fighter-bomber, escort, and counter-air missions to and participated in the Battle of the Bulge from December 1944 – January 1945.

They supported the airborne attack across the Rhine in March 1945.

=== VE Day ===
The 353rd flew combat missions until the end of April 1945. After the end of hostilities, the group trained and prepared for transfer to the Pacific Theater. With the end of World War II in September, the group left Raydon and transferred back to Camp Kilmer, New Jersey where it was inactivated on 18 October 1945.

The group was inactivated on 18 October 1945 and allotted to Georgia Air National Guard as the 116th Fighter Group on 24 May 1946.

== Notable pilots ==
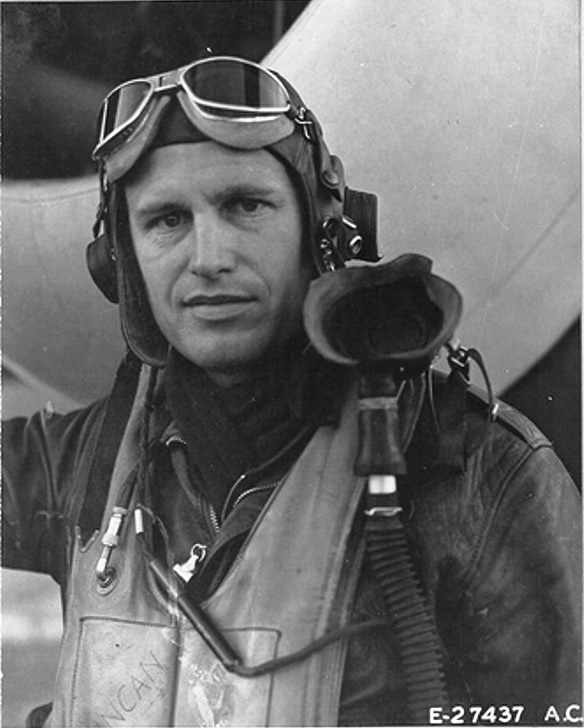
Col. Glenn E Duncan commanding officer of the 353rd Fighter Group

Col. Glenn E. Duncan was commanding officer of the 353rd Fighter Group, the top ace in the Group and one of the top pilots in the Eighth Air Force with 19.5 aerial victories. He was shot down in Germany in July 1944 then traveled to Holland, where he evaded capture and worked with the Dutch resistance until the end of the war.

Walter C. Beckham was one of the top P-47 Thunderbolt aces and claimed 18 kills from September 1943 until February 1944 when he was shot down while strafing the Ostheim airfield. He was a prisoner in Stalag Luft III and Stalag XIII-D.

Lt. Col. Loren G. McCollom commanded the 353rd Fighter Squadron from August to November 1943 after commanding the 6lst Fighter Squadron, 56th Fighter Group. He was shot down by flak in November 1943 and was a prisoner at Stalag Luft I.

Lt. Col. Joseph A. Morris commanded the 353rd Fighter Group from the beginning to 16 August 1943, MIA.

Capt. Harrison B. "Bud" Tordoff was an Ace of the 353rd Fighter Group. He served two tours from October to December 1944 and March to May of 1945. During his second tour he was one few pilots in history to shoot down a Me 262 fighter jet. His aircraft, "Upupa Epops" survives him at the Flying Heritage & Combat Armor Museum in Everett, Washington.
