= 446th Airlift Wing =

446th Airlift Wing

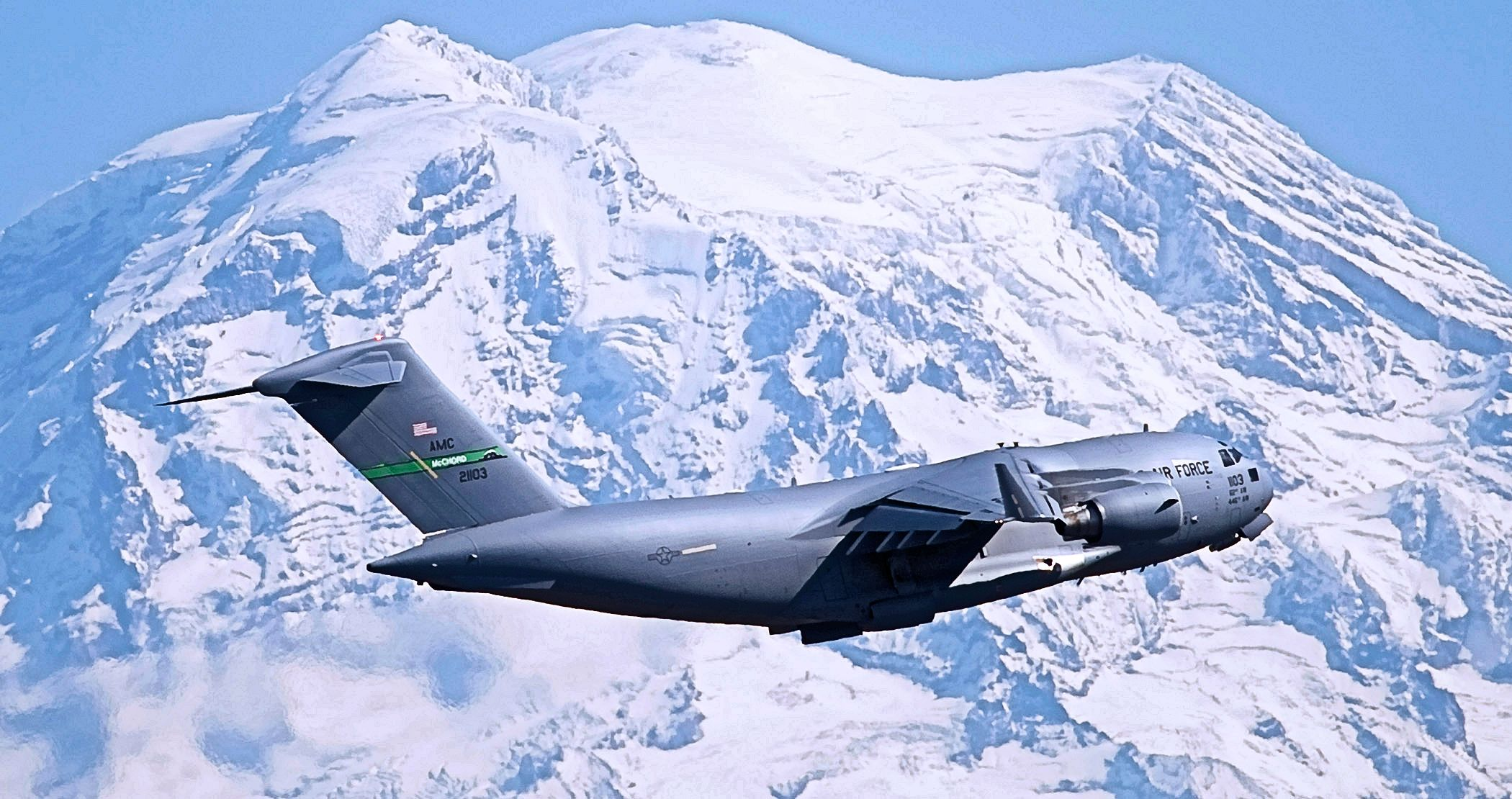
- 446th/62d Airlift Wing – C-17 Globemaster III 02-1103
- Active: 1955–1972; 1973–present
- Country: United States
- Branch: United States Air Force
- Type: Wing
- Role: Airlift
- Part of: Air Force Reserve Command
- Garrison/HQ: McChord Air Force Base, Washington
- Nickname: The Rainier Wing
- Decorations: Air Force Meritorious Unit Award; Air Force Outstanding Unit Award; Republic of Vietnam Gallantry Cross with Palm

Commanders
- Current commander: Colonel Joseph M. Vanoni

Insignia
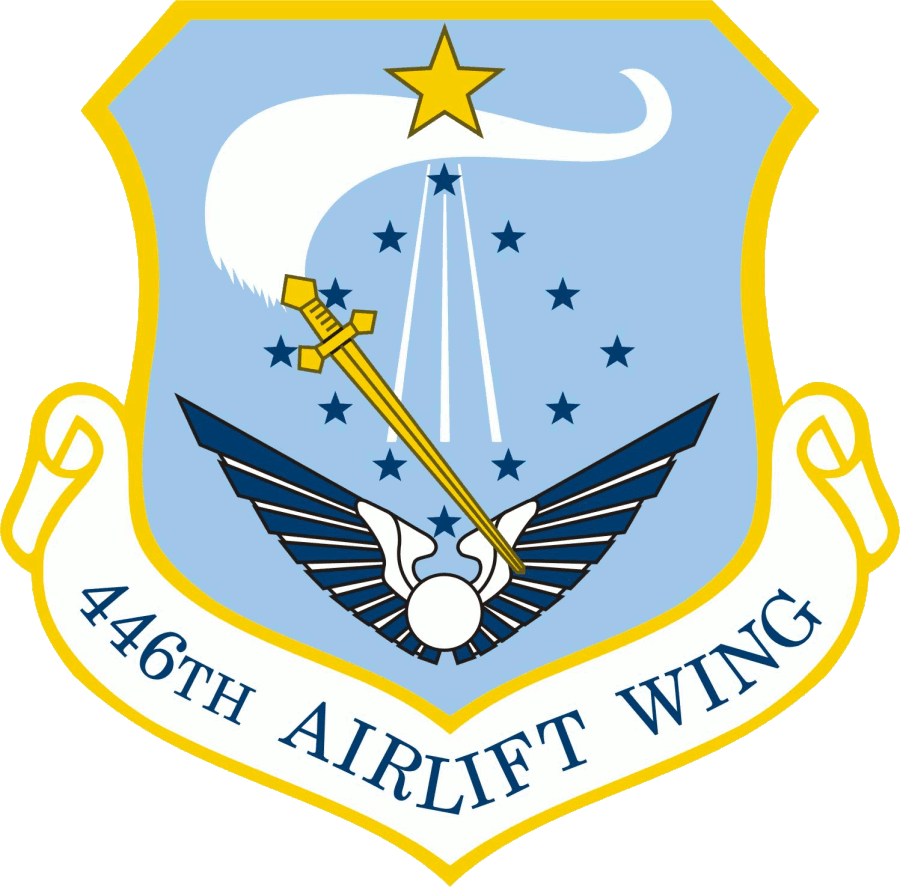
- 446th Airlift Wing emblem (Note: Approved 3 August 1960.)
- Tail stripe: Green, "McChord" in white

Aircraft flown
- Transport: C-17 Globemaster III

The 446th Airlift Wing is an Air Reserve component of the United States Air Force. It is assigned to the Fourth Air Force, Air Force Reserve Command, stationed at McChord AFB, Joint Base Lewis-McChord, Washington. The 446th is an associate unit of the 62d Airlift Wing and if mobilized the wing is gained by Air Mobility Command.

== Overview ==
The 446th Airlift Wing is Washington State's only Air Force Reserve flying unit and is headquartered at Joint Base Lewis-McChord (McChord AFB / McChord Field), Wash. The mission of the wing is to provide citizen warriors and maintain equipment to meet America's global airlift requirements.

The nearly 2,400 men and women assigned to the 446th support the Air Mobility Command mission around the world on a daily basis, performing 44 percent of all C-17 missions leaving McChord AFB. The 446th is an associate unit of the 62d Airlift Wing, and blends into active-duty operations when called upon.

== Units ==
The 446th Airlift Wing consists of the following major units:

- 446th Operations Group

97th Airlift Squadron
313th Airlift Squadron
728th Airlift Squadron
446th Aeromedical Evacuation Squadron

- 446th Mission Support Group
- 446th Maintenance Group
- 446th Aerospace Medicine Squadron
- 446th Aeromedical Staging Squadron
- 446th Maintenance Squadron

== History ==
For related history and lineage, see 446th Operations Group

=== Initial activation and Detached Squadron Concept ===
Following the Korean War, the Air Force desired that all reserve units be designed to augment the regular forces in the event of a national emergency. There were six reserve pilot training wings that had no mobilization mission. On 18 May 1955, they were discontinued and replaced by three troop carrier wings and two fighter-bomber wings. As part of this reorganization, the 8706th Pilot Training Wing at Ellington Air Force Base, Texas was discontinued and its personnel and equipment transferred to the newly activated 446th Troop Carrier Wing. The wing was initially equipped with Curtiss C-46 Commando transports and, if mobilized, would be gained by Tactical Air Command.

At the same time, the Air Force began detaching Air Force Reserve squadrons from their parent wing locations to separate sites. The concept offered several advantages: communities were more likely to accept the smaller squadrons than the large wings and the location of separate squadrons in smaller population centers would facilitate recruiting and manning. As it finally evolved in the spring of 1955, the Continental Air Command's plan called for placing Air Force Reserve units at fifty-nine installations located throughout the United States. Under this plan, although the 704th and 705th Troop Carrier Squadrons were located with the wing at Ellington, its 706th Troop Carrier Squadron was stationed at Donaldson Air Force Base, South Carolina.

The wing trained under the supervision of the 2578th Air Force Reserve Training Center in troop carrier operations. In the summer of 1956, the wing participated in Operation Sixteen Ton during its two weeks of active duty training. Sixteen Ton was performed entirely by reserve troop carrier units and moved United States Coast Guard equipment From Floyd Bennett Naval Air Station to Isla Grande Airport in Puerto Rico and San Salvador in the Bahamas. After the success of this operation, the wing began to use inactive duty training periods for Operation Swift Lift, transporting high priority cargo for the air force and Operation Ready Swap, transporting aircraft engines, between Air Materiel Command's depots.

The 706th Squadron at Donaldson was inactivated in November 1957 and its personnel and equipment were transferred to the 357th Troop Carrier Squadron, which was activated in its place. 1957 also marked the beginning of the wing's transition from the Commando to Fairchild C-119 Flying Boxcars. In May 1958, the 357th moved to New Orleans Naval Air Station and became part of the 446th Wing.

In 1958, the 2578th Center was inactivated and some of its personnel were absorbed by the wing. In place of active duty support for reserve units, ConAC adopted the Air Reserve Technician Program, in which a cadre of the unit consisted of full-time personnel who were simultaneously civilian employees of the Air Force and held rank as members of the reserves. The 446th was the first reserve organization to implement this program.

By 1959, the wing transported and airdropped troops and supplies during training exercises. In April 1959 the wing reorganized under the Dual Deputate organization, (Note: Under this plan flying squadrons reported to the wing Deputy Commander for Operations and maintenance squadrons reported to the wing Deputy Commander for Maintenance.) and all flying squadrons were directly assigned to the wing, while the 446th Troop Carrier Group was inactivated.

The 706th Squadron joined the wing again when it was reactivated at Barksdale Air Force Base, Louisiana in February 1959. It was only at Barksdale for a little over two years, for in May 1961, it transferred its personnel and equipment to the 78th Troop Carrier Squadron and moved to New Orleans, where it took over the personnel and equipment of the 357th, which moved to Bates Field, Alabama as the reserves moved squadrons to reunite them with the successors of their World War II headquarters.

=== Organization of groups under the wing ===
Although the dispersal of flying units under the Detached Squadron Concept was not a problem when the entire wing was called to active service, mobilizing a single flying squadron and elements to support it proved difficult. Under this concept, all support organizations were located with the wing headquarters, not with the squadrons. This weakness was demonstrated in the partial mobilization of reserve units during the Berlin Crisis of 1961. To resolve this, Continental Air Command, (ConAC) determined to reorganize its reserve wings by establishing groups with support elements for each of its troop carrier squadrons at the start of 1962. This reorganization would facilitate mobilization of elements of wings in various combinations when needed. However, as this plan was entering its implementation phase, another partial mobilization occurred for the Cuban Missile Crisis. The formation of troop carrier groups was delayed until January for wings that had not been mobilized. The 924th and 925th Troop Carrier Groups at Ellington and the 926th Troop Carrier Groups at New Orleans, were all assigned to the wing on 17 January.

The 446th flew experimental drop missions in support of the National Aeronautics and Space Administration (NASA) from 1962 to 1967. They ferried Lockheed C-130 Hercules transports to Taiwan in 1966 and to Southeast Asia, 1968–1970.

Wing reservists called to active duty during the 1968 Pueblo Crisis. The wing was inactivated in 1972.

=== Reserve associate unit ===
One year later the 446th was reactivated and redesignated the 446th Military Airlift Wing (Associate) at McChord AFB, Washington, being co-located with 62d Airlift Wing and used its aircraft. The wing flew special assignment, channel, and humanitarian airlift missions worldwide, and took part in joint and combined training exercises involving airlift of troops and cargo. Wing personnel also took part in Operation Babylift and the evacuation of Saigon in 1975, and in the evacuation of American dependents from Tehran, Iran, in 1979.

In 1983, in support of the Grenada Operation, the 446th flew the 82d Airborne Division back to Fort Bragg, North Carolina. In 1986, crew from the 446th repatriated remains of American missing in action from Southeast Asia. The following year, the 40th Aeromedical Evacuation Squadron (now 446th Aeromedical Evacuation Squadron) and the 313th Airlift Squadron evacuated burn victims from a San Juan, Puerto Rico, hotel fire.

December 1989 saw several 446th crews called to participate in Operation Just Cause in Panama, while in 1990, hundreds of 446th reservists were activated for Operation Desert Shield. In 1991, nearly 1,000 446th reservists were called to active duty in support of Operation Desert Storm. Hundreds more wing reservists were activated for duty at McChord. Wing reservists pitched in to assist survivors of Mount Pinatubo eruption in Operation Fiery Vigil. Then came Operation Provide Comfort where aircrews airlifted humanitarian aid to Iraqi Kurds.

=== Post Cold War era ===
In 1992, the wing flew humanitarian relief missions to the former Soviet Union and also provided support to Operation Provide Hope. The wing also flew humanitarian relief supplies in for victims of Hurricane Andrew. In February 1992, the wing was re-designated again, this time as the 446th Airlift Wing.

In 1993, Reservists from the 446th flew into war-torn Croatia as part of a huge relief effort. Two members of the 40th Aeromedical Evacuation Squadron (now 446th Aeromedical Evacuation Squadron) assisted in airlifting Army Warrant Officer Michael Durant out of Mogadishu, Somalia, after he was released from being held captive when his helicopter was shot down. An aircrew from the 97th Airlift Squadron flew into Kathmandu, Nepal, to provide humanitarian aid after two weeks of flooding cuts off supplies.

As part of 1994's Operation Uphold Democracy, wing aircrews flew in support of Haitian intervention. Twenty-three medical professionals from the 446th Airlift Wing also spent their two-week annual tour in an isolated, Honduras village and provided medical and dental care while receiving training in the management of tropical diseases. The 446th also took part in Operation Support Hope, ferrying in supplies and food for Rwandan refugees.

In 1995, the wing took part in Operation Safe Passage, in which Cuban refugees were repatriated from Panama to Cuba, and Operation Joint Endeavor where wing aircrews joined the effort to bring peace to war torn Bosnia. An aircrew from the 313th Airlift Squadron flew a 62-member Federal Emergency Management Agency (FEMA) team into Oklahoma City four hours after the bombing of the federal building. Three days later, an aircrew from the 97th Airlift Squadron flew four badly needed special burn beds, and a box full of stuffed animals, to the Children's Hospital of Oklahoma City. That same year, the 728th Airlift Squadron flew into Hanoi, Vietnam, to repatriate the remains of 10 Americans who were listed as missing in action.

In 1996, aircrews from the 446th Airlift Wing elect to stay on for extra duty flying out of Germany to allow active-duty aircrews to return to the United States as part of Operation Joint Endeavor. The 728th Airlift Squadron flew humanitarian aid to Chad in Africa as part of the Denton Amendment. The 728th also flew a team from the Puget Sound Federal Emergency Management Administration (FEMA) to Atlanta to support the 1996 Summer Olympic Games.

In 1997, the 728th flew into Beijing, China, to repatriate what is believed to be five service members listed as missing in action from World War II. Nearly 70 medical professionals from the 446th Aeromedical Evacuation Squadron and 446th Aeromedical Staging Squadron were among 2,000 people participated in the massive medical exercise Patriot Medstar at Westover Air Reserve Base, MA. Aircrew members from the 313th AS and 728th AS airlifted four victims from the Korean Air jetliner crash in Guam to hospitals at Kelly Air Force Base, Texas. Aircrews from all three flying squadrons flew supplies and equipment to Antarctica in Operation Deep Freeze, a presidential mandated mission to support the National Science Foundation's experiments at the South Pole. Aeromedical crews from the 446th Aeromedical Evacuation Squadron flew their first C-17 aeromedevac mission airlifting an 8-month-old baby. One aeromedical aircrew from the 446th Aeromedical Evacuation Squadron was called up to deploy to Southwest Asia in support of the military buildup in the Middle East.

In 1999, a combined Air Force Reserve and active-duty Lockheed C-141 Starlifter aircrew from McChord scrambled to airdrop emergency medical supplies to the South Pole for a doctor who discovered a lump in her breast. The 97th Airlift Wing aircrew gained international attention as it airdropped six bundles of medical supplies as well as fresh fruit in outside temperatures of close to 100 below zero in the back of the C-141 with the doors open.

On 30 July 1999, the first Boeing C-17 Globemaster III was delivered to McChord. The first plane that was accepted was production model P-52. The 728th Airlift Squadron is the first squadron to fly the C-17s. The first operational C-17 mission flown by the 728th was an historic repatriation flight to Hanoi, Vietnam, in November. The McChord reservists transported 11 sets of what are believed to be American servicemen from the Korean and Vietnam wars. It was the first time remains from two separate wars were repatriated at the same time. A news crew from CNN flew on the historic mission.

In 2000, two C-17 pilots from the 728th Airlift Squadron flew U.S. military aircraft into Mozambique delivering critically needed aid to the flood victims in Southern Africa 1 March. They delivered 85,000 pounds of supplies. That same year, Eight Air Force Reservists from the 446th Airlift Wing assisted in identifying the remains of the 19 marines killed in April's MV-22 plane crash in Arizona. Aircrews from the 728th Airlift Squadron and 313th Airlift Squadrons also flew Army firefighters to Idaho and Montana to help battle the Western wildfires in the worst wildfire season to hit the United States in 50 years. Two members from the 446th Airlift Control Flight performed ground support for aircrews battling the wildfires in the West.

== Lineage ==
- Established as the 446th Troop Carrier Wing, Medium on 11 April 1955

Activated in the reserve on 25 May 1955
Redesignated 446th Tactical Airlift Wing on 1 July 1967
Inactivated on 1 July 1972

- Redesignated 446th Military Airlift Wing (Associate) on 29 January 1973

Activated in the reserve on 1 July 1973
Redesignated: 446th Airlift Wing (Associate) on 1 February 1992
Redesignated: 446th Airlift Wing on 1 October 1994

=== Assignments ===
- Fourteenth Air Force, 25 May 1955
- Tenth Air Force, 25 March 1958
- Fourth Air Force Reserve Region, 1 September 1960
- Central Air Force Reserve Region, 31 December 1969 – 1 July 1972
- Western Air Force Reserve Region, 1 July 1973
- Fourth Air Force, 8 October 1976 – present

=== Components ===
Groups

- 446th Troop Carrier Group (later 446 Operations Group): 25 May 1955 – 14 April 1959; 1 August 1992 – present
- 908th Troop Carrier Group (later 908th Tactical Airlift Group): 1 December 1965 – 1 March 1968
- 917th Military Airlift Group: 21 April 1971 – 25 February 1972
- 924th Troop Carrier Group (later 924th Tactical Airlift Group): 17 January 1963 – 1 July 1972
- 925th Troop Carrier Group (later 925th Tactical Airlift Group): 17 January 1963 – 25 March 1968
- 926th Troop Carrier Group (later 926th Tactical Airlift Group): 17 January 1963 – 1 March 1968; 1 October 1969 – 1 July 1972
- 932d Aeromedical Airlift Group, 1 August 1992 – 1 October 1994

Squadrons

- 97th Military Airlift Squadron: 1 July 1973 – 1 August 1992
- 313th Military Airlift Squadron: 1 July 1973 – 1 August 1992
- 357th Troop Carrier Squadron: 14 April 1959 – 8 May 1961
- 704th Troop Carrier Squadron: 14 April 1959 – 17 January 1963
- 705th Troop Carrier Squadron (later 705 Tactical Airlift Squadron, 705 Tactical Airlift Training Squadron): 14 April 1959 – 17 January 1963; 25 March 1968 – 1 July 1972
- 706th Troop Carrier Squadron: 14 April 1959 – 17 January 1963
- 728th Military Airlift Squadron: 1 January – 1 August 1992

=== Stations ===
- Ellington Air Force Base, Texas, 25 May 1955 – 1 July 1972
- McChord Air Force Base (later part of Joint Base Lewis-McChord), Washington, 1 July 1973 – present

=== Aircraft ===
- Beechcraft C-45 Expeditor (1955–1958)
- Curtiss C-46 Commando (1955–1958)
- Fairchild C-119 Flying Boxcar (1957–1970)
- Lockheed C-130 Hercules (1968–1972)
- Lockheed RC-130 Hercules (1970–1972)
- Douglas C-124 Globemaster II (1971–1972)
- Lockheed C-141 Starlifter (1973–2002)
- McDonnell Douglas C-17 Globemaster III (1999–Present)
