= 704th Fighter Squadron =

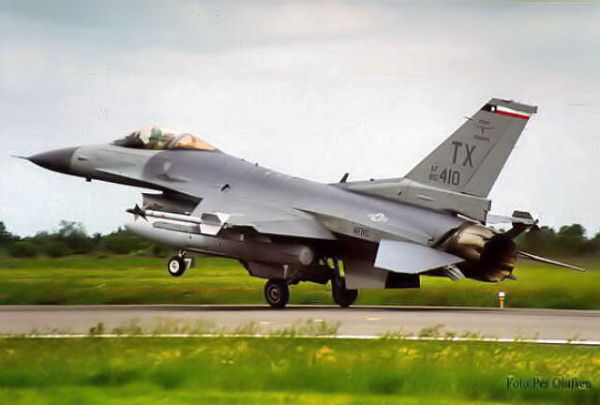
- Squadron F-16 Fighting Falcon taking off (Note: Aircraft is General Dynamics F-16C Block 30 Fighting Falcon, serial 85-1410.)
- Active: 1943–1945; 1948–1951; 1955–1996
- Country: United States
- Branch: United States Air Force
- Role: Fighter
- Nickname: The Vultures (World War II) Outlaws
- Decorations: Air Force Outstanding Unit Award

Insignia
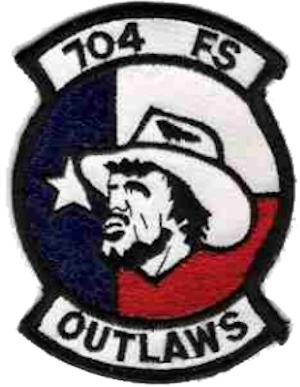
- Patch with 704th Fighter Squadron Emblem

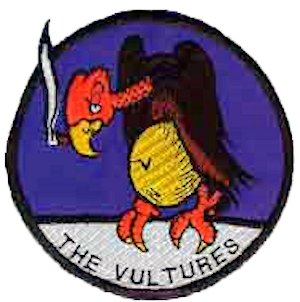
- Patch with 704th Bombardment Squadron emblem (World War II)
- ETO Fuselage Code Letters: FL

The 704th Fighter Squadron is an inactive United States Air Force unit. It was last assigned to the 924th Fighter Group at Bergstrom Air Force Base, Texas, where it was inactivated on 27 September 1996, when Air Force operations at Bergstrom ended.

The squadron was first activated as the 704th Bombardment Squadron in 1943. After training in the United States with Consolidated B-24 Liberators, it deployed to the European Theater of Operations, where it engaged in the strategic bombing campaign against Germany. After V-E Day, the squadron returned to the United States and was inactivated.

The squadron was activated in the reserve in 1948. It was mobilized for the Korean War in 1951, but its personnel were used as fillers for other units and it was inactivated shortly after mobilization. The squadron again became a reserve unit in 1955 as the 704th Troop Carrier Squadron. It served as an airlift unit in the reserve until 1981, when it became a fighter unit as the 704th Tactical Fighter Squadron. In this role, the squadron was inactivated in 1996.

== History ==
=== World War II ===
==== Training for combat ====
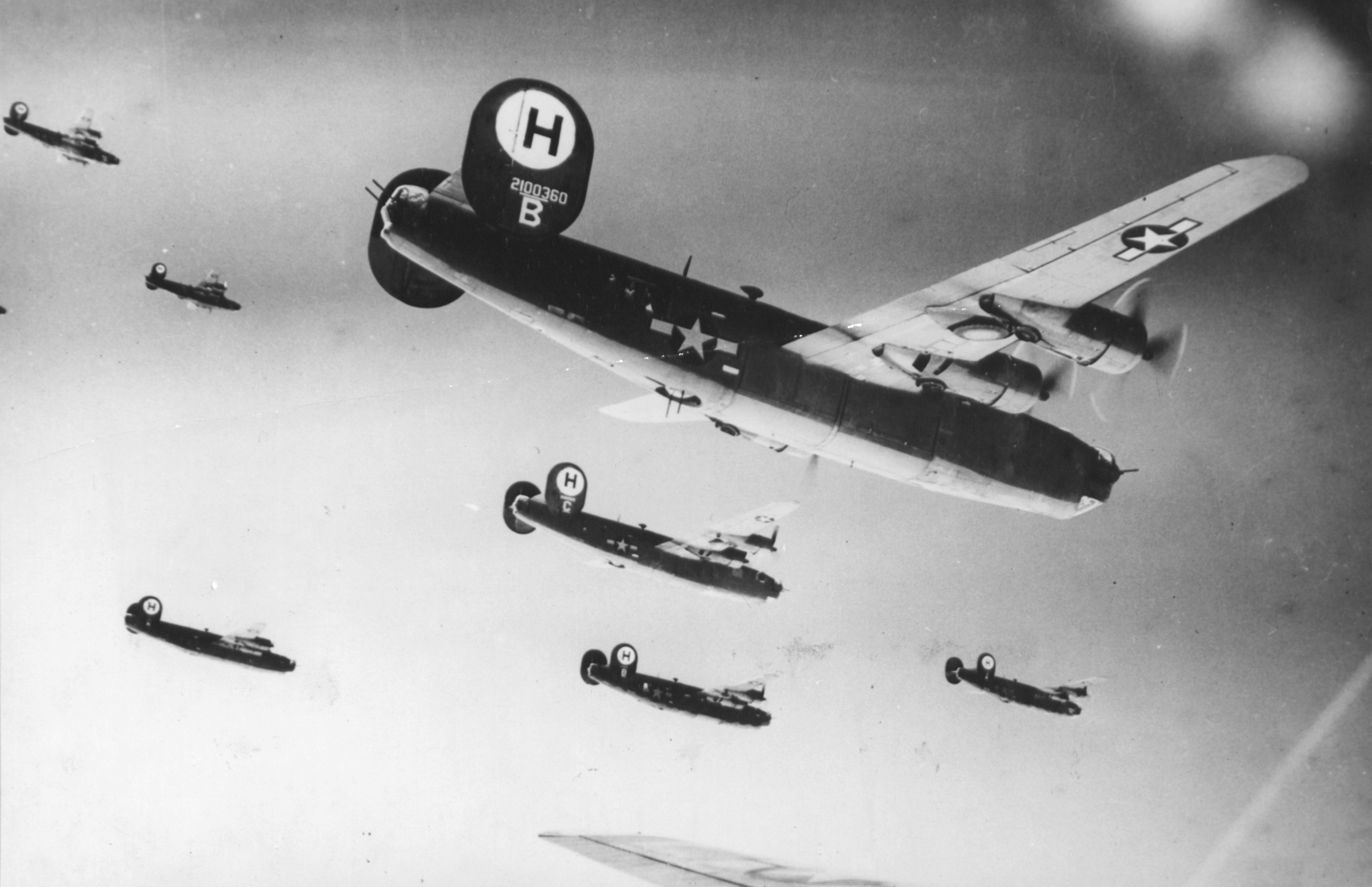
446th Bomb Group Liberators on their way to a target (Note: Identifiable is Ford Motors built Consolidated B-24H-1-FO Liberator, serial 42-7607, The Spirit of '77. This plane completed the war and returned to the United States. Baugher, Joe (26 April 2023). "1942 USAF Serial Numbers". Joe Baugher.)

The squadron was first activated on 1 April 1943 at Davis-Monthan Field, Arizona as the 704th Bombardment Squadron with an initial cadre drawn from the 39th Bombardment Group. It was one of the original squadrons of the 446th Bombardment Group. The cadre departed for Orlando Army Air Base, Florida for training with the Army Air Forces School of Applied Tactics, where they flew simulated combat missions from Montbrook Army Air Field.

The unit headed for Alamogordo Army Air Field, New Mexico in June 1943, but was diverted to Lowry Field, Colorado, where the squadron was filled out and advanced training was completed. The ground echelon left Lowry on 18 October 1943 for Camp Shanks, New York and embarked on the RMS Queen Mary, sailing on 27 October 1943 and arriving in Greenock on the Firth of Clyde on 2 November 1943. The aircraft left Lowry on 20 October 1943 for staging at Lincoln Army Air Field, Nebraska The aircrews ferried their planes under the control of Air Transport Command via the southern route from Florida through Puerto Rico, Brazil, Senegal, and Morocco to England. The 704th was part of the first United States Army Air Forces group to complete the transatlantic hop from Brazil to Africa without the installation of additional bomb bay fuel tanks.

==== Combat in the European Theater ====
The squadron arrived at its combat station, RAF Flixton, in early November 1943 and flew its first mission on 16 December against Bremen. It engaged primarily in long-range strategic bombardment of enemy targets. Its targets included ball bearing factories at Berlin, marshalling yards at Koblenz, submarine pens at Kiel, aircraft plants at Munich, port facilities at Ludwigshafen and aircraft engine manufacturing plants at Rostock.

The squadron was occasionally diverted from strategic missions to carry out air support and interdiction missions. It supported Operation Overlord, the invasion of Normandy, by attacking transportation targets, including bridges, along with airfields and strong points in France. On D Day, the squadron and the rest of the 446th Group led the first heavy bomber mission of the day. B-24H 42-95203 FL-D “Red Ass” of the 446th Bomb Group, 704th BS was the lead plane. During Operation Market Garden, the attempt to seize a bridgehead across the Rhine in the Netherlands, the 704th dropped supplies to Allied troops near Nijmegen. It struck lines of communications during the Battle of the Bulge. During Operation Varsity in March 1945, it supplied ground and airborne troops near Wesel. The squadron flew its last combat mission on 25 April 1945 against Salzburg, Austria.

The squadron began leaving England in June 1945, with the ground echelon sailing again on the Queen Mary on 6 July. The squadron began to reassemble at Sioux Falls Army Air Field, South Dakota, but was inactivated there on 28 August.

=== Air Force reserve ===
==== Corollary unit ====
The 704th Bombardment Squadron was activated again under Air Defense Command (ADC) in the reserves in March 1948 at Carswell Air Force Base, Texas. Shortly after the squadron was activated, in July 1948, Continental Air Command (ConAC) assumed reserve training responsibility from ADC. It was nominally a Boeing B-29 Superfortress very heavy bombardment squadron, although it is not certain that it was equipped or fully manned. The May 1949 Air Force Reserve program called for a new type of unit, the Corollary Unit, which was a reserve unit integrated with an active duty unit. The plan was viewed as the best method to train reservists by mixing them with an existing regular unit to perform duties alongside the regular unit. The squadron became a "Heavy" unit in June 1949 and a corollary of the 7th Bombardment Wing, which was the regular combat wing at Carswell. In May 1951, the squadron was mobilized for the Korean War, as were all reserve corollary units, and its personnel were used as fillers for other units, while the squadron was inactivated on 25 June.

==== Airlift operations at Ellington ====
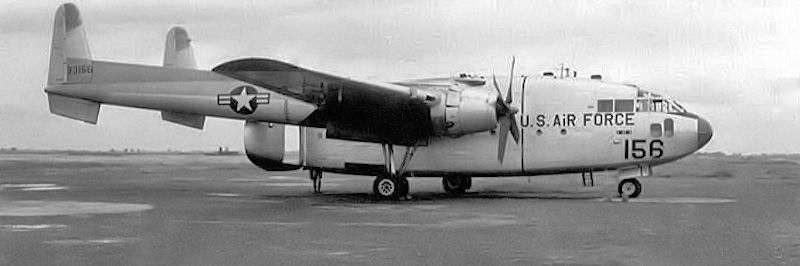
C-119G Flying Boxcar as flown by the squadron

Reserve flying organizations began to be reformed in July 1952. However, the Air Force desired that all reserve units be designed to augment the regular forces in the event of a national emergency. The six reserve pilot training wings, including the 8706th Pilot Training Wing at Ellington Air Force Base, Texas, however, had no mobilization mission. On 18 May 1955, the 8706th Wing was discontinued and replaced by the 446th Troop Carrier Wing. Along with Beechcraft C-45 Expeditors inherited from the pilot training program, the squadron began training with Curtiss C-46 Commandos as the 704th Troop Carrier Squadron. By late 1956, about 150 Fairchild C-119 Flying Boxcars became surplus to the regular Air Force, and in 1957 the squadron converted to the C-119.

In the summer of 1956, the squadron participated in Operation Sixteen Ton during its two weeks of active duty training. Sixteen Ton was performed entirely by reserve troop carrier units and moved United States Coast Guard equipment From Floyd Bennett Naval Air Station to Isla Grande Airport in Puerto Rico and San Salvador in the Bahamas. After the success of Operation Sixteen Ton, the squadron began to use inactive duty training periods for Operation Swift Lift, transporting high priority cargo for the air force and Operation Ready Swap, transporting aircraft engines, between Air Materiel Command’s depots. At Ellington, the squadron initially trained with the 2578th Air Force Reserve Flying Center, but in 1958, the center was inactivated and some of its personnel were absorbed by the squadron. Ellington was the first base to use the Air Reserve Technician Program, in which a cadre of the unit consisted of full-time personnel who were simultaneously civilian employees of the Air Force and held rank as members of the reserves. Also in 1958, it was assigned directly to the 446th Troop Carrier Wing when ConAC converted its reserve units to the dual deputy organization, which eliminated operational and maintenance group headquarters. (Note: Under this plan flying squadrons reported to the wing Deputy Commander for Operations and maintenance squadrons reported to the wing Deputy Commander for Maintenance)

Since 1955, the reserve flying force included squadrons that were not located with their parent wings, but were spread over Air Force, Navy and civilian airfields under what was called the Detached Squadron Concept. However, under this concept, support organizations remained with the wing. Although the dispersal of flying units under the Detached Squadron Concept was not a problem when the entire wing was called to active service, mobilizing a single flying squadron and elements to support it proved difficult. This weakness was demonstrated in the partial mobilization of reserve units during the Berlin Crisis of 1961. To resolve this, ConAC determined to reorganize its reserve wings by establishing groups with support elements for each of its troop carrier squadrons at the start of 1962. However, as this plan was entering its implementation phase, another partial mobilization occurred for the Cuban Missile Crisis. The formation of troop carrier groups was delayed until January 1963. This reorganization would facilitate mobilization of elements of wings in various combinations when needed. In January 1963, the 924th Troop Carrier Group was activated as the headquarters for the 704th and its support elements.

In 1962, the squadron had begun supporting NASA's Manned Spacecraft Center, specifically airdrop missions of Project Gemini spacecraft and paraglider mockups. These operations continued until 1970. The squadron also transported cargo and troops during military exercises and supported numerous disaster relief operations. It participated in humanitarian missions such as transporting an iron lung to a South American patient and transporting food and medicine to a famine-stricken village in Mexico. It dropped hay to snowbound cattle in Texas and New Mexico during Operation Haylift, and airlifted supplies to New Orleans following Hurricane Betsy.

The squadron became the first reserve unit to convert to the Lockheed C-130 Hercules aircraft in 1968. It ferried aircraft to and from Southeast Asia during the Vietnam War. Throughout the 1970s, the squadron continued humanitarian missions including relief, fire fighting, and search and rescue missions in the wake of disasters including hurricanes, an oil rig explosion in the Gulf of Mexico, and forest fires in California. It also airlifted snow removal equipment to the northeast United States.

==== Move to Bergstrom ====
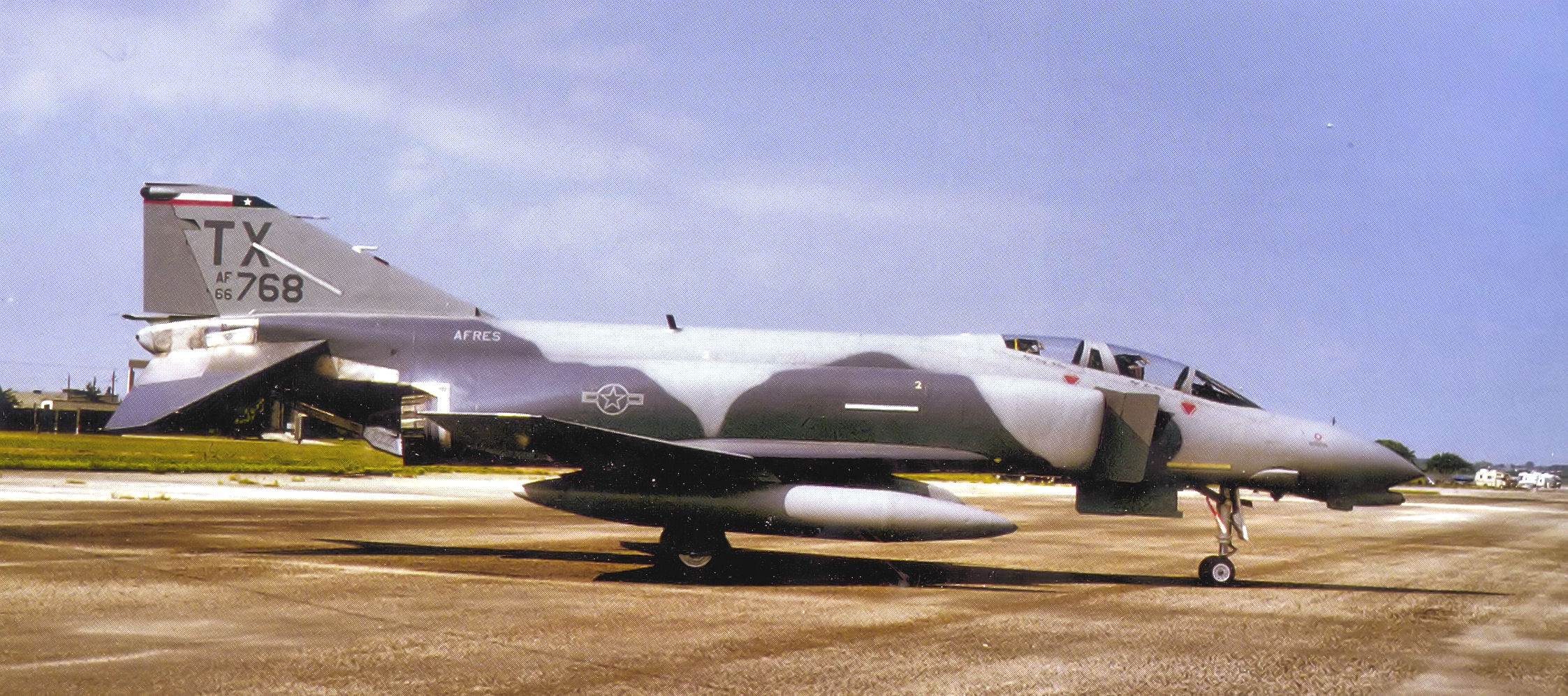
Squadron F-4 Phantom II at Bergstrom AFB in 1990. (Note: Aircraft is McDonnell F-4D-32-MC Phantom II, serial 66-8768. This plane also served with the Texas Air National Guard.is now on display in front of American Legion post in Bastrop, Texas.)

The squadron moved to Bergstrom Air Force Base, Texas in March 1976 with the end of reserve flying activity at Ellington. The squadron converted from airlift to fighter aircraft in 1981 and in July of that year became the 704th Tactical Fighter Squadron. Afterwards, the squadron participated in fighter competitions throughout the United States and overseas. It trained reservists for worldwide deployment as they provided air-to-air and air-to-ground training after 1990. The squadron replaced its McDonnell F-4 Phantom IIs with General Dynamics F-16 Fighting Falcons in July 1991. It upgraded its Vipers from the F-16A Block 15 to the F-16D Block 32 in 1994.

The 1995 Base Realignment and Closure Commission found that the Air Force Reserve had its F-16s stationed at too many bases and recommended that Bergstrom be closed and the 924th Fighter Wing be inactivated, with its aircraft sent to other reserve fighter organizations or retired. In September 1996 the 924th Fighter Wing and its elements were inactivated with the closing of the base.

== Lineage ==
- Constituted as the 704th Bombardment Squadron (Heavy) on 20 March 1943

Activated on 1 April 1943
Redesignated 704th Bombardment Squadron, Heavy on 20 August 1943
Inactivated on 28 Aug 1945

- Redesignated 704th Bombardment Squadron, Very Heavy on 26 September 1947

Activated in the reserve on 26 March 1948
Redesignated 704th Bombardment Squadron, Heavy on 27 June 1949
Ordered to active service on 1 May 1951
Inactivated on 25 June 1951

- Redesignated 704th Troop Carrier Squadron, Medium on 11 April 1955

Activated in the reserve on 25 May 1955
Redesignated 704th Tactical Airlift Squadron, on 1 July 1967
Redesignated 704th Tactical Fighter Squadron on 1 July 1981
Redesignated 704th Fighter Squadron on 1 October 1994
Inactivated on 30 September 1996

=== Assignments ===
- 446th Bombardment Group: 1 April 1943 – 28 August 1945
- 446th Bombardment Group: 26 March 1948 – 25 June 1951
- 446th Troop Carrier Group: 25 May 1955 – 14 April 1959
- 924th Troop Carrier Group (later 924th Tactical Airlift Group, 924th Tactical Fighter Group, 924th Fighter Group): 17 January 1963
- 924th Operations Group: 1 August 1992 – 30 September 1996

=== Stations ===
- Davis-Monthan Field, Arizona, 1 April 1943
- Lowry Field, Colorado, 8 June 1943 – c. 24 October 1943
- RAF Flixton (RAF Bungay) (AAF-125), England, 4 November 1943 – 5 July 1945
- Sioux Falls Army Air Field, South Dakota, 15 July 1945 – 28 August 1945
- Carswell Air Force Base, Texas, 26 March 1948 – 25 June 1951
- Ellington Air Force Base, Texas, 25 May 1955
- Bergstrom Air Force Base, Texas, 17 March 1976 – 30 September 1996

=== Aircraft ===
- Consolidated B-24 Liberator, 1943–1945
- Beechcraft C-45 Expediter, 1955–1957
- Curtiss C-46 Commando, 1955–1957
- Fairchild C-119 Flying Boxcar, 1957–1967
- Lockheed C-130 Hercules, 1967–1981
- McDonnell F-4 Phantom II, 1981–1991
- General Dynamics F-16 Fighting Falcon, 1994–1996

=== Awards and campaigns ===
| Award streamer | Award | Dates | Notes |
|---|---|---|---|
| | Air Force Outstanding Unit Award | 1 December 1967–10 January 1972 | 704th Tactical Airlift Squadron |
| | Air Force Outstanding Unit Award | 1 September 1978–29 February 1980 | 704th Tactical Airlift Squadron |
| | Air Force Outstanding Unit Award | 1 April 1983–30 March 1985 | 704th Tactical Fighter Squadron |
| | Air Force Outstanding Unit Award | 1 June 1986–31 May 1988 | 704th Tactical Fighter Squadron (Note: AF Pamphlet 900-2 and Air Force Personnel Services both list an award of the Vietnamese Gallantry Cross with Palm to the "704th Tactical Airlift Group" from 26 October to 6 November 1972. As the Republic of Vietnam awarded the Gallantry Cross to a number of reserve units that deployed during this period, and the Air Force has never had a group with this name, it seems that this may reflect an award to the squadron.) |

| Campaign Streamer | Campaign | Dates | Notes |
|---|---|---|---|
| | Air Offensive, Europe | 4 November 1943 – 5 June 1944 | 704th Bombardment Squadron |
| | Normandy | 6 June 1944 – 24 July 1944 | 704th Bombardment Squadron |
| | Northern France | 25 July 1944 – 14 September 1944 | 704th Bombardment Squadron |
| | Rhineland | 15 September 1944 – 21 March 1945 | 704th Bombardment Squadron |
| | Central Europe | 22 March 1944 – 21 May 1945 | 704th Bombardment Squadron |
| | Ardennes-Alsace | 16 December 1944 – 25 January 1945 | 704th Bombardment Squadron |

== See also ==
- Army Air Forces Center
- B-24 Liberator units of the United States Army Air Forces
- List of C-130 Hercules operators
- General Dynamics F-16 Fighting Falcon operators
