= 705th Tactical Airlift Training Squadron =

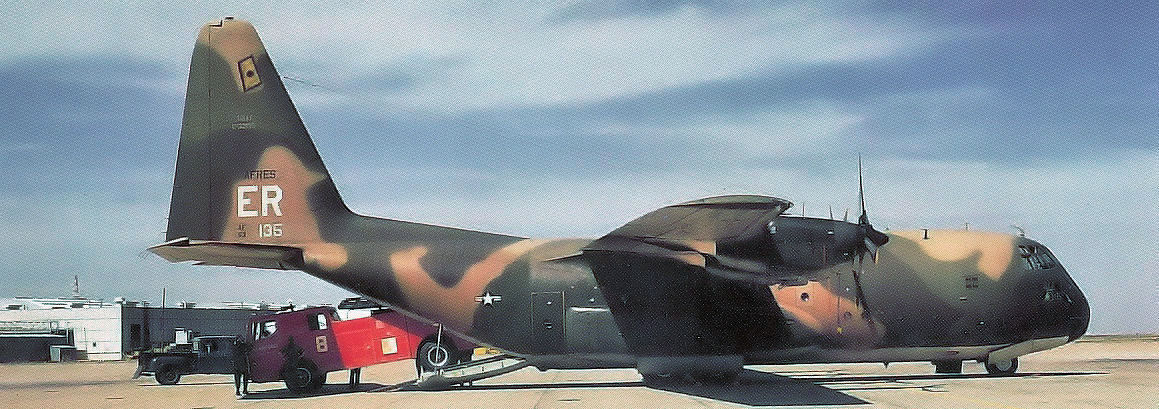
- 705th Tactical Airlift Training Squadron C-130 Hercules (Note: Aircraft is Lockheed C-130A-LM Hercules, serial 53-3135. This aircraft was sold to the Mexican Air Force in July 1987. Baugher, Joe (9 April 2023). "1953 USAF Serial Numbers". Joe Baugher.)
- Active: 1943–1945; 1947–1951; 1955–1976
- Country: United States
- Branch: United States Air Force
- Role: Airlift training
- Engagements: European Theater of Operations
- Decorations: Air Force Outstanding Unit Award

Insignia
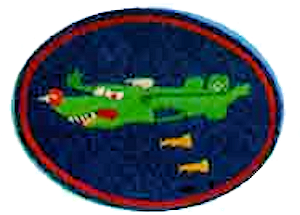
- 705th Bombardment Squadron emblem (World War II)
- Tail code: ER
- ETO fuselage code Squadron Color: HN; Yellow

The 705th Tactical Airlift Training Squadron is an inactive United States Air Force unit. It was last assigned to the 924th Tactical Airlift Group at Ellington Air Force Base, Texas where it was inactivated on 30 June 1976, when reserve flying operations at Ellington ended.

The squadron was first activated as the 705th Bombardment Squadron in 1943. After training in the United States with Consolidated B-24 Liberators, it deployed to the European Theater of Operations, where it engaged in the strategic bombing campaign against Germany. After V-E Day, the squadron returned to the United States and was inactivated.

The squadron was activated in the reserve in 1948. It was mobilized for the Korean War in 1951, but its personnel were used as fillers for other units and it was inactivated shortly after mobilization. The squadron again became a reserve unit in 1955 as the 705th Troop Carrier Squadron. It served as an airlift unit in the reserve until 1968, when it became a combat crew training unit as the 705th Tactical Airlift Squadron (CCTS) and trained Lockheed C-130 Hercules aircrews until inactivated.

== History ==
=== World War II ===
==== Training for combat ====
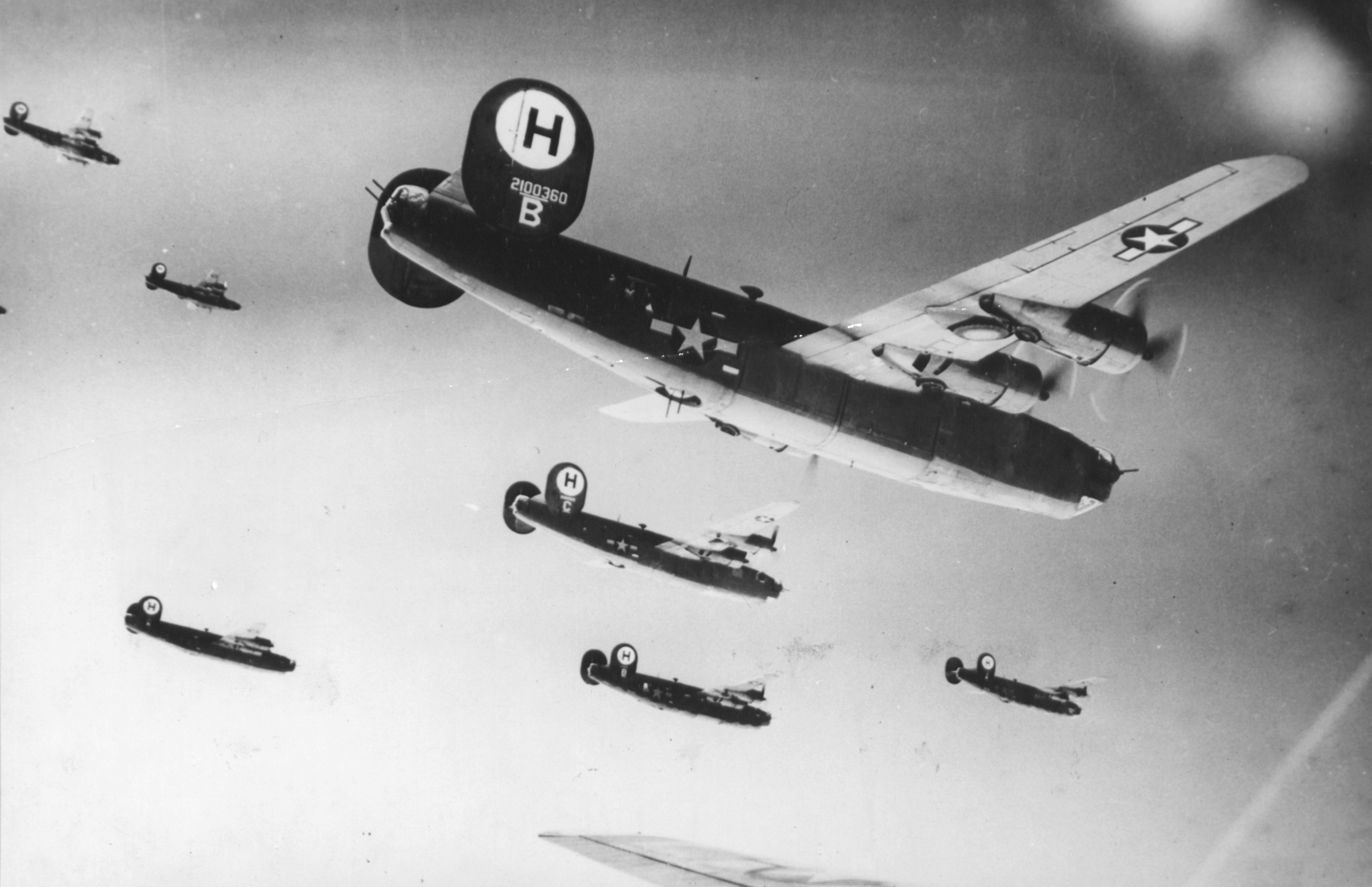
446th Bomb Group Liberators on their way to a target. (Note: Identifiable is Ford Motors built Consolidated B-24H-1-FO Liberator, serial 42-7607, The Spirit of '77. This plane completed the war and returned to the United States. Baugher, Joe (26 April 2023). "1942 USAF Serial Numbers". Joe Baugher.)

The squadron was first activated on 1 April 1943 at Davis-Monthan Field, Arizona as the 705th Bombardment Squadron with an initial cadre drawn from the 39th Bombardment Group. It was one of the original squadrons of the 446th Bombardment Group. The cadre departed for Orlando Army Air Base, Florida for training with the Army Air Forces School of Applied Tactics, where they flew simulated combat missions from Montbrook Army Air Field.

The unit headed for Alamogordo Army Air Field, New Mexico in June 1943, but was diverted to Lowry Field, Colorado, where the squadron was filled out and advanced training was completed. The squadron lost one aircraft during this training. The ground echelon left Lowry on 18 October 1943 for Camp Shanks, New York and embarked on the RMS Queen Mary, sailing on 27 October 1943 and arrived in Greenock on the Firth of Clyde on 2 November 1943. The aircraft left Lowry on 20 October 1943 for staging at Lincoln Army Air Field, Nebraska. The aircrews ferried their planes under the control of Air Transport Command via the southern route from Florida through Puerto Rico, Brazil, Senegal, and Morocco to England. The 705th was part of the first United States Army Air Forces group to complete the Transatlantic hop from Brazil to Africa without the installation of additional bomb bay fuel tanks.

==== Combat in the European Theater ====
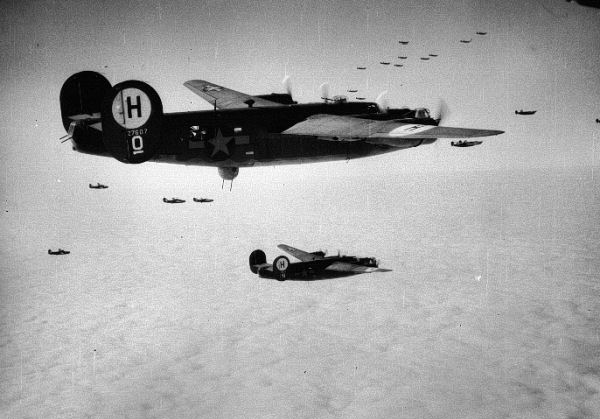
446th Bomb Group Liberators on their way to a target. (Note: Identifiable is Consolidated B-24J-95-CO Liberator, serial 42-100360. This aircraft was shot down 29 April 1944 by a Bf 109 on a mission to Berlin. Three crew members were killed, seven became prisoners of war. Baugher, Joe (6 May 2023). "1942 USAF Serial Numbers". Joe Baugher. Missing Air Crew Report 4485.)

The squadron arrived at its new base at RAF Flixton (Note: The station was referred to as Flixton by the Army Air Forces, but was also known as RAF Bungay.) in the east of England in October. The 705th flew its first mission on 16 December 1943 against shipping facilities in Bremen. The unit operated chiefly against strategic objectives. Its targets included U-boat installations at Kiel, the port at Bremen, a chemical plant at Ludwigshafen, ball-bearing works at Berlin, aircraft engine plants at Rostock, aircraft factories at Munich, marshalling yards at Coblenz, motor works at Ulm, and oil refineries at Hamburg.

Besides strategic missions, the 705th often carried out close air support and air interdiction operations. It supported Operation Overlord, the invasion of Normandy, in June 1944 by attacking strong points, bridges, airfields, transportation, and other targets in France. The squadron aided ground forces at Caen and Saint-Lô during July by hitting bridges, gun batteries, and enemy troops. It dropped supplies to Allied troops near Nijmegen during Operation Market-Garden in September. The unit bombed marshalling yards, bridges, and road junctions during the Battle of the Bulge in December 1944 and January 1945. It flew low level missions to drop medical supplies, arms, and food to airborne and ground troops near Wesel during Operation Varsity in March 1945. The 705th flew its last combat mission on 25 April, attacking a bridge near Salzburg, Austria.

After V-E Day, the 705th flew transport missions to France, sometimes landing at fields that had been targets the previous year. It also flew "Trolley" missions, transporting support personnel for "sightseeing" trips over Germany to view the results of their efforts. The squadron began to redeploy to the US in June 1945. The first aircraft of the air echelon departed the United Kingdom in mid-June 1945 flying the northern route via Iceland. The ground echelon sailed from Greenock on the Queen Mary on the sixth of July 1945 and arrived in New York on 11 July 1945. Personnel were given 30 days leave. The ground and air echelons reassembled at Sioux Falls Army Air Field, South Dakota in late July. It was inactivated on 28 August 1945.

=== Air Force reserve ===
==== Corollary unit ====
The 705th Bombardment Squadron was activated again under Air Defense Command (ADC) in the reserves in March 1948 at Carswell Air Force Base, Texas. Shortly after the squadron was activated, in July 1948, Continental Air Command (ConAC) assumed reserve training responsibility from ADC. It was nominally a Boeing B-29 Superfortress very heavy bombardment squadron, although it is not certain that it was equipped or fully manned. The May 1949 Air Force Reserve program called for a new type of unit, the Corollary Unit, which was a reserve unit integrated with an active duty unit. The plan was viewed as the best method to train reservists by mixing them with an existing regular unit to perform duties alongside the regular unit. The squadron became a "Heavy" unit in June 1949 and a corollary of the 7th Bombardment Wing, which was the regular combat wing at Carswell. In May 1951, the squadron was mobilized for the Korean War, as were all reserve corollary units, and its personnel were used as fillers for other units, while the squadron was inactivated on 25 June.

==== Airlift operations at Ellington ====
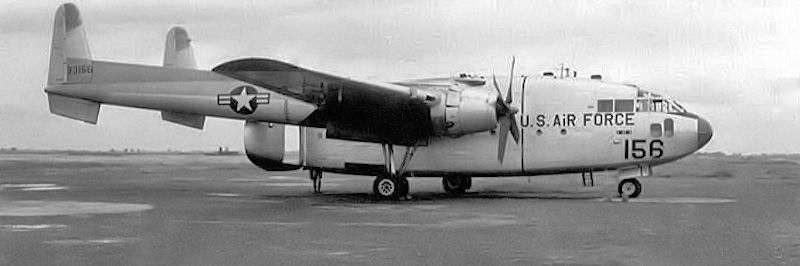
C-119G Flying Boxcar as flown by the squadron

Reserve flying organizations began to be reformed in July 1952. However, the Air Force desired that all reserve units be designed to augment the regular forces in the event of a national emergency. The six reserve pilot training wings, including the 8706th Pilot Training Wing at Ellington Air Force Base, Texas, however, had no mobilization mission. On 18 May 1955, the 8706th Wing was discontinued and replaced by the 446th Troop Carrier Wing. Along with Beechcraft C-45 Expeditors inherited from the pilot training program, the squadron began training with Curtiss C-46 Commandos as the 705th Troop Carrier Squadron. By late 1956, about 150 Fairchild C-119 Flying Boxcars became surplus to the regular Air Force, and in 1957 the squadron converted to the C-119.

In the summer of 1956, the squadron participated in Operation Sixteen Ton during its two weeks of active duty training. Sixteen Ton was performed entirely by reserve troop carrier units and moved United States Coast Guard equipment From Floyd Bennett Naval Air Station to Isla Grande Airport in Puerto Rico and San Salvador in the Bahamas. After the success of Operation Sixteen Ton, the squadron began to use inactive duty training periods for Operation Swift Lift, transporting high priority cargo for the air force and Operation Ready Swap, transporting aircraft engines, between Air Materiel Command's depots. At Ellington, the squadron initially trained with the 2578th Air Force Reserve Flying Center, but in 1958, the center was inactivated and some of its personnel were absorbed by the squadron. Ellington was the first base to use the Air Reserve Technician Program, in which a cadre of the unit consisted of full time personnel who were simultaneously civilian employees of the Air Force and held rank as members of the reserves. In 1958 it was assigned directly to the 446th Troop Carrier Wing when ConAC converted its reserve units to the dual deputy organization, which eliminated operational and maintenance group headquarters. (Note: Under this plan flying squadrons reported to the wing Deputy Commander for Operations and maintenance squadrons reported to the wing Deputy Commander for Maintenance.) The group's squadrons were reassigned directly to the Wing.

Since 1955, the reserve flying force included squadrons that were not located with their parent wings, but were spread over Air Force, Navy and civilian airfields under what was called the Detached Squadron Concept. However, under this concept, support organizations remained with the wing. Although the dispersal of flying units under the Detached Squadron Concept was not a problem when the entire wing was called to active service, mobilizing a single flying squadron and elements to support it proved difficult. This weakness was demonstrated in the partial mobilization of reserve units during the Berlin Crisis of 1961. To resolve this, ConAC determined to reorganize its reserve wings by establishing groups with support elements for each of its troop carrier squadrons at the start of 1962. However, as this plan was entering its implementation phase, another partial mobilization occurred for the Cuban Missile Crisis. The formation of troop carrier groups was delayed until January 1963. This reorganization would facilitate mobilization of elements of wings in various combinations when needed. In January 1963, the 925th Troop Carrier Group was activated as the headquarters for the 705th and its support elements.

==== C-130 Hercules training school ====
The squadron was one of the first reserve units to upgrade to the Lockheed C-130 Hercules. In March 1968, the squadron became a combat crew training unit as the demand for C-130 training increased with the conversion of other reserve units from the C-119. As a training unit, it was no longer necessary to have associated support elements available for deployment support, so the 925th Group was inactivated and the squadron was once again assigned directly to the 446th Wing. The squadron operated the USAF Combat Crew Training School (Tactical Airlift – C-130), and trained not only reservists, but members of the Air National Guard, regular Air Force and other military services using the Hercules. The school was manned primarily by air reserve technicians, and was the first reserve unit to train active duty military.

In 1972, the squadron was briefly assigned to the 433d Tactical Airlift Wing at Kelly Air Force Base, Texas, when the 446th Wing inactivated, but was soon transferred to the remaining reserve headquarters at Ellington, the 924th Tactical Airlift Group. The squadron continued to train aircrews until 1976, when it was inactivated with the end of reserve flying operations at Ellington.

== Lineage ==
- Constituted as the 705th Bombardment Squadron (Heavy) on 20 March 1943

Activated on 1 April 1943
Redesignated 705th Bombardment Squadron, Heavy on 20 August 1943
Inactivated on 28 August 1945

- Redesignated 705th Bombardment Squadron, Very Heavy on 26 September 1947

Activated in the reserve on 26 March 1948
Redesignated 705th Bombardment Squadron, Heavy on 27 June 1949
Ordered to active service on 1 May 1951
Inactivated on 25 June 1951

- Redesignated 705th Troop Carrier Squadron, Medium on 11 April 1955

Activated in the reserve on 25 May 1955
Redesignated 705th Tactical Airlift Squadron on 1 July 1967
Redesignated 705th Tactical Airlift Squadron (CCTS) (Note: Combat Crew Training Squadron) on 25 March 1968
Redesignated 705th Tactical Airlift Training Squadron on 1 June 1972
Inactivated on 1 April 1976

=== Assignments ===
- 446th Bombardment Group: 1 April 1943 – 28 August 1945
- 446th Bombardment Group: 26 March 1948 – 25 June 1951
- 446th Troop Carrier Group: 25 May 1955 – 14 April 1959
- 925th Troop Carrier Group (later Tactical Airlift Group): 17 January 1963
- 446th Tactical Airlift Wing: 25 March 1968
- 433d Tactical Airlift Wing: 1 July 1972
- 924th Tactical Airlift Group: 1 September 1972 – 1 April 1976

=== Stations ===
- Davis-Monthan Field, Arizona, 1 April 1943
- Lowry Field, Colorado, 8 June 1943 – c. 24 October 1943
- RAF Flixton (AAF-125), England, 4 November 1943 – 5 July 1945
- Sioux Falls Army Air Field, South Dakota, 15 July 1945 – 28 August 1945
- Carswell Air Force Base, Texas, 26 March 1948 – 25 June 1951
- Ellington Air Force Base (later Ellington Air Reserve Base), Texas, 25 May 1955 – 1 April 1976

=== Aircraft ===
- Consolidated B-24 Liberator, 1943–1945
- Curtiss C-46 Commando, 1955–1956
- Fairchild C-119 Flying Boxcar, 1956–1967
- Lockheed C-130 Hercules, 1967–1976

=== Awards and campaigns ===
Award streamer	Award	Dates	Notes
	Air Force Outstanding Unit Award	25 April 1968 – 25 April 1970	705th Tactical Airlift Squadron
	Air Force Outstanding Unit Award	26 April 1970 – 31 December 1970	705th Tactical Airlift Squadron
	Air Force Outstanding Unit Award	1 January 1971 – 10 January 1972	705th Tactical Airlift Squadron

Campaign Streamer	Campaign	Dates	Notes
	Air Offensive, Europe		705th Bombardment Squadron
	Normandy		705th Bombardment Squadron
	Northern France		705th Bombardment Squadron
	Rhineland		705th Bombardment Squadron
	Central Europe		705th Bombardment Squadron
	Ardennes-Alsace		705th Bombardment Squadron

== See also ==
- B-24 Liberator units of the United States Army Air Forces
- List of C-130 Hercules operators
