= RAF Bungay =

Former Royal Air Force station in Suffolk, England

RAF Bungay RAF Flixton USAAF Station 125 RNAS Bungay HMS Europa II
- Near Bungay, Suffolk in England
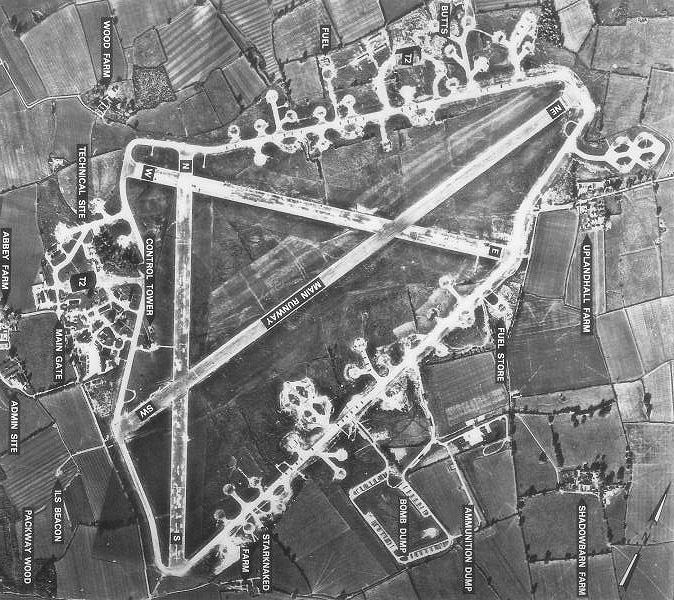
- Bungay Airfield - 6 October 1945

Site information
- Type: Royal Air Force station
- Code: JO
- Owner: Air Ministry
- Operator: Royal Air Force; United States Army Air Forces; Royal Navy
- Controlled by: Eighth Air Force; Fleet Air Arm
- Condition: Disused

Location
- Shown within Suffolk RAF Bungay (the United Kingdom)
- Coordinates: 52°25′54″N 001°24′41″E

Site history
- Built: 1942
- Built by: Kirk & Kirk Ltd.
- In use: 1942-1955
- Fate: Farmland
- Battles/wars: European Theatre of World War II; Air Offensive, Europe July 1942 - May 1945

Airfield information
- Elevation: 38 metres (125 ft) AMSL
Runways
Direction	Length and surface
04/22	1,730 metres (5,676 ft) Concrete
08/26	1,225 metres (4,019 ft) Concrete
17/35	1,300 metres (4,265 ft) Concrete

Royal Air Force Bungay or more simply RAF Bungay (known locally as Flixton) is a former Royal Air Force station located 3 miles (4.8 km) south-west of Bungay in the English county of Suffolk. The airfield is also known after the village of Flixton, near which it was built.

== History ==
Bungay airfield was originally planned as a satellite for nearby RAF Hardwick and was constructed by Kirk & Kirk Ltd., during 1942 with a main runway of 6,000 feet in length and two intersecting secondary runways, one of 4,220 feet and the other of 4,200 feet. In common with other airfields of the period, the technical, administrative and domestic buildings were dispersed to lessen the impact of any enemy air attack. The buildings were all of a temporary nature and the various sites were chiefly to the west of the airfield.

=== United States Army Air Forces use ===
The airfield was allocated to the Americans and transferred to the United States Army Air Forces Eighth Air Force and designated Station 125.

USAAF Station Units assigned to RAF Bungay were:

- 460th Sub-Depot (VIII Air Force Service Command)
- Quartermaster Depot Q-104
- 18th Weather Squadron
- 25th Station Complement Squadron
- 555th Quartermaster Battalion
- 1214th Quartermaster Company
- 1248th Military Police Company
- 1821st Ordnance Supply & Maintenance Company
- 885th Chemical Company
- 979th Quartermaster Service Company
- 987th Military Police Company
- 2035th Engineer Fire Fighting Platoon
- 212th Finance Section
- 558th Army Postal Unit

==== 428th Bombardment Squadron ====
Bungay was still unfinished when the Twelfth Air Force 428th Bombardment Squadron, 310th Bombardment Group (Medium) at RAF Hardwick arrived with fourteen North American B-25 Mitchell medium bombers in October 1942. The squadron moved on to Médiouna Airfield, French Morocco on 18 November 1942. A 12th Air Force film clip indicates that the 310th Bombardment Group was the first 12th Air Force group to fly the northern transport route from the United States to Europe and initially arrived at Prestwick, Scotland in October 1942.

==== 329th Bombardment Squadron ====
In December 1942, eight Consolidated B-24 Liberators of the 329th Bombardment Squadron, 93d Bombardment Group (Heavy) at RAF Hardwick were sent to Bungay to prepare for special intruder operations. These aircraft conducted raids in bad weather with the mission of harassing the German air raid warning system. The 329th flew these missions until March 1943 when they rejoined the 93d at Hardwick.

==== 446th Bombardment Group (Heavy) ====
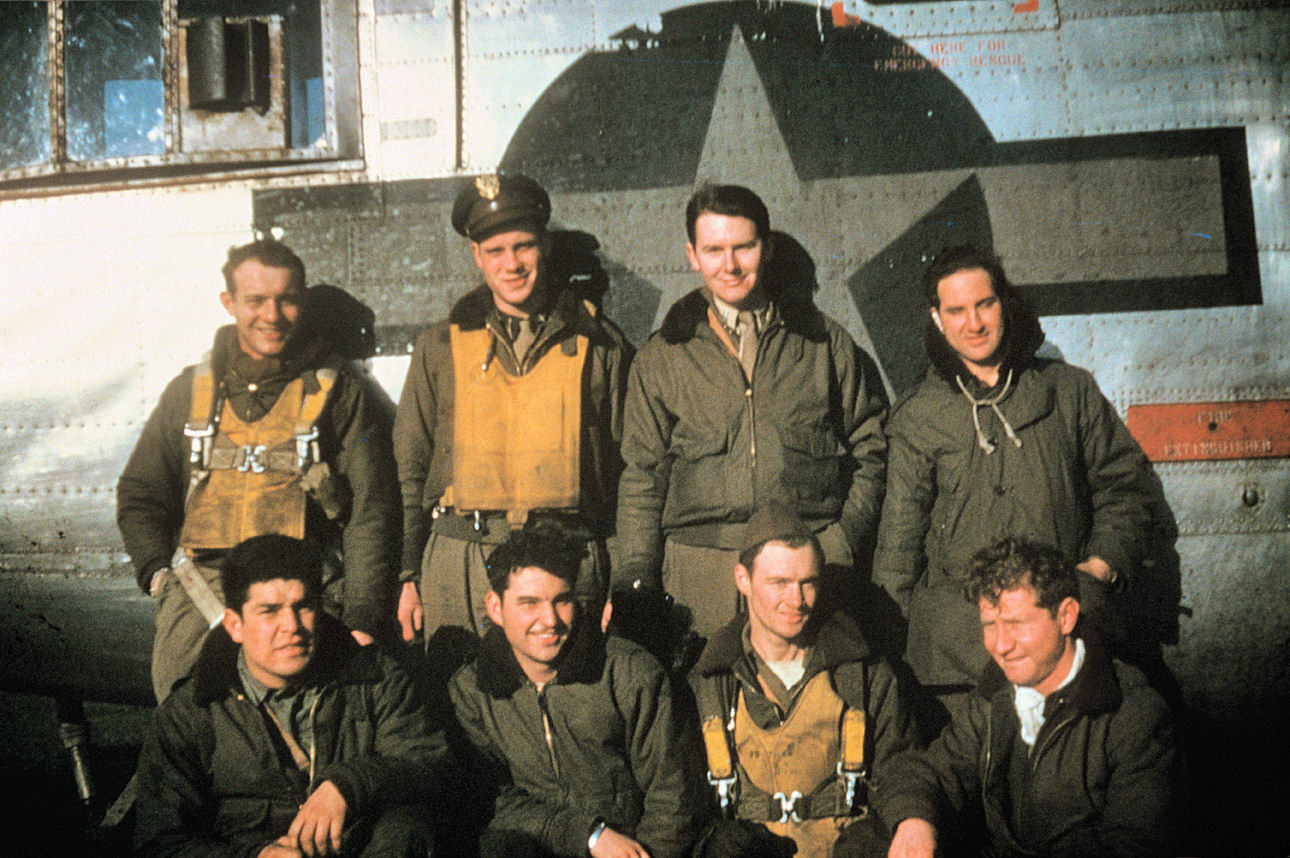
A bomber crew, led by Lieutenant Grant, of the 706th Bomb Squadron, 446th Bomb Group with their B-24J-155-CO Liberator (RT-H, serial number 44-40268) nicknamed "Kentucky Belle".

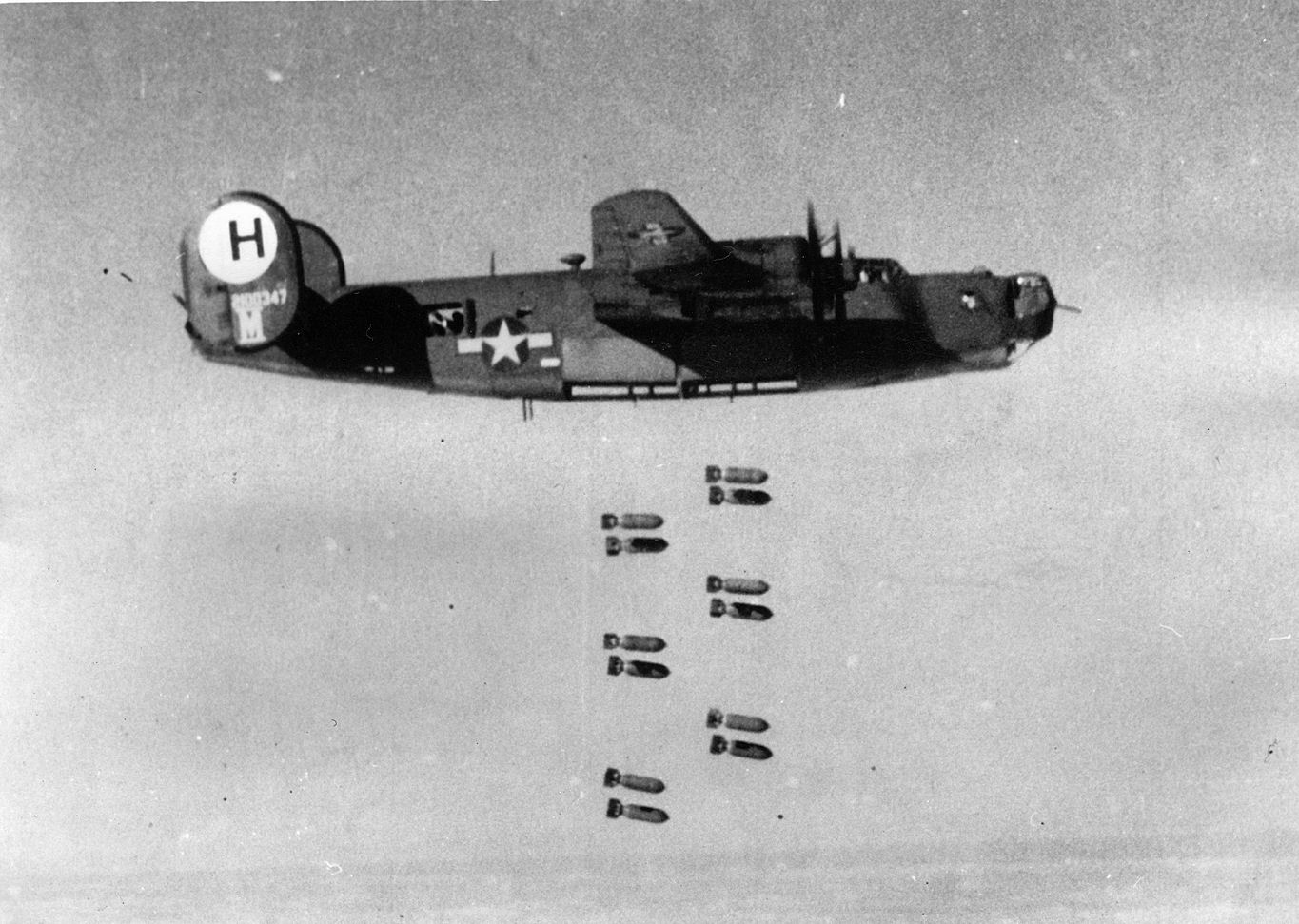
A B-24J-95-CO Liberator ("Lil' Max", JU-M, serial number 42-100347) of the 707th Bomb Squadron, 446th Bomb Group dropping bombs on Gotha, Germany from 17,000 ft, 20 February 1944.

Additional construction was performed at Bungay until November 1943 when the airfield received the Eighth Air Force 446th Bombardment Group (Heavy) from Lowry AAF, Colorado. The 446th was assigned to the 20th Combat Bombardment Wing and the group tail code was a "Circle-H". Its operational squadrons were:

- 704th Bombardment Squadron (FL)
- 705th Bombardment Squadron (HN)
- 706th Bombardment Squadron (RT)
- 707th Bombardment Squadron (JU)

The 446th operated chiefly against strategic objectives on the Continent from December 1943 until April 1945. Targets included U-boat installations at Kiel, the port at Bremen, a chemical plant at Ludwigshafen, ball-bearing works at Berlin, aero-engine plants at Rostock, aircraft factories at Munich, marshalling yards at Coblenz, motor works at Ulm, and oil refineries at Hamburg.

Besides strategic missions, the group often carried out support and interdictory operations. It supported the Normandy landings in June 1944 by attacking strong points, bridges, airfields, transportation, and other targets in France. It aided ground forces at Caen and Saint-Lô during July by hitting bridges, gun batteries, and enemy troops. Dropped supplies to Allied troops near Nijmegen during the airborne attack on the Netherlands in September. Bombed marshalling yards, bridges, and road junctions during the Battle of the Bulge, December 1944 - January 1945. Dropped supplies to airborne and ground troops near Wesel during the Allied assault across the Rhine in March 1945.

The 446th Bomb Group flew its last combat mission on 25 April, attacking a bridge near Salzburg. It returned to Sioux Falls AAF, South Dakota, during June and July 1945, being inactivated there on 18 August 1945.

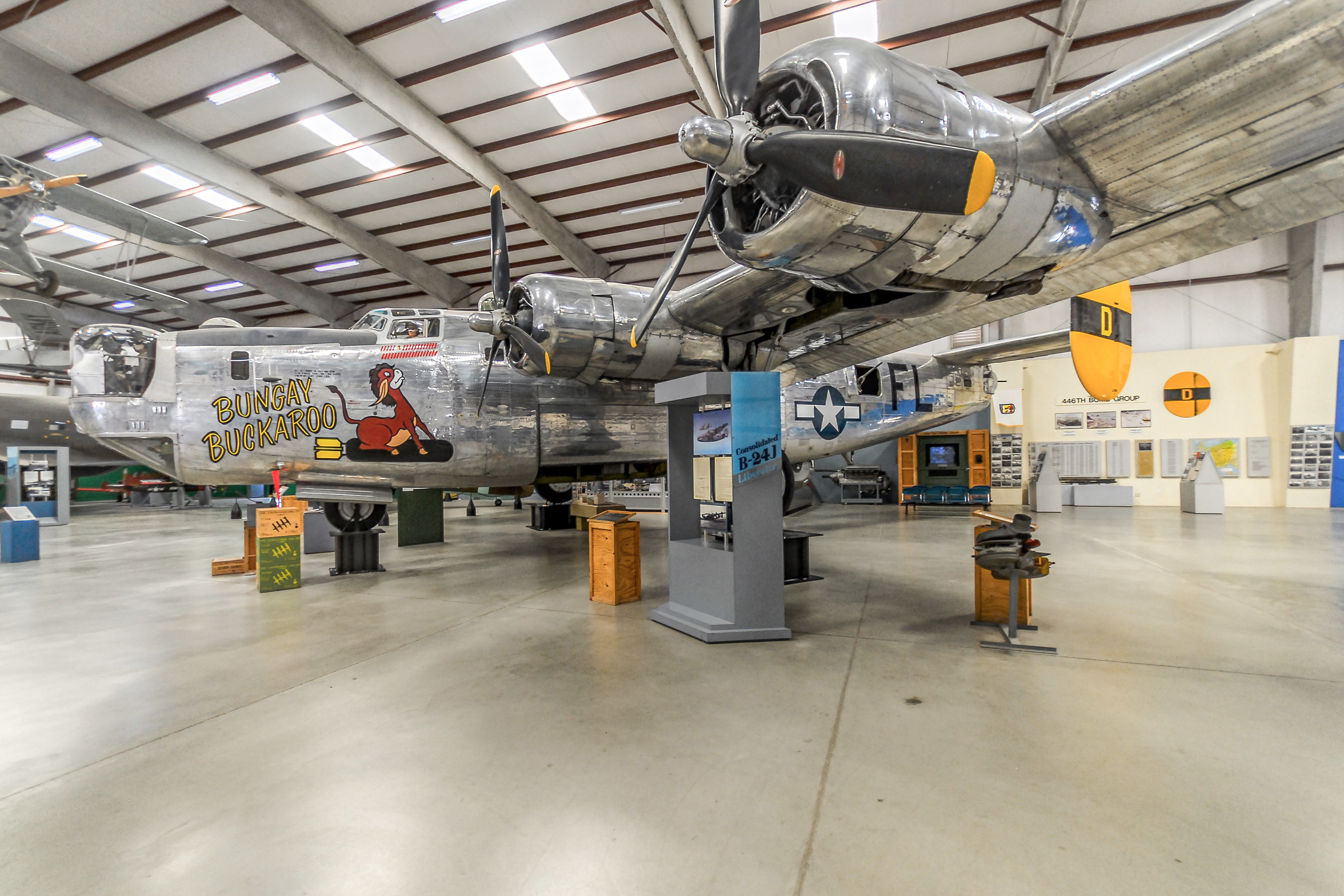
B-24J in the markings of both 446th Bomb Group (shown) and Indian Air Force, Number 6 Squadron (1968, far side)

The Pima Air & Space Museum as of 2013 has a Liberator N7866 with nose art "Bungay Buckaroo" related to the 446th Bomb Group stationed at Bungay in 1944.

=== Royal Navy ===
The Royal Navy acquired use of the former USAAF used airbase, when it was transferred from the Air Ministry on loan in September 1945 and it was commissioned on 25 September as HMS Europa II. Known as Royal Naval Air Station Bungay (RNAS Bungay), it was used as a satellite airfield to RNAS Halesworth, Suffolk, under the command of Lieutenant Commander R.J. Hanson DSO, DSC. However, there is no record of any Fleet Air Arm units operating out of this airfield. It was subsequently ‘paid off’ on 31 May 1946 and was returned to the Air Ministry, closing on the same day.

=== Royal Air Force ===
In 1946 it was returned to RAF control and was assigned to No. 53 Maintenance Unit RAF and became a maintenance sub-unit of No. 94 MU RAF which had its HQ at RAF Great Ashfield. Stored on the runways and in the buildings, were 250 lb., 500 lb., 2000 lb., and 4,000 lb. bombs, balloon cable cutting cartridges, depth charges, 7-inch parachute flares and German ammunition. The latter two items were eventually taken to 53 MU at RAF Pulham, and destroyed there. Some time in July 1949, the site was taken over by 53 MU until Bungay's closure in 1955. The airfield was eventually put up for sale and disposed of in 1961/1962.

=== Post war ===
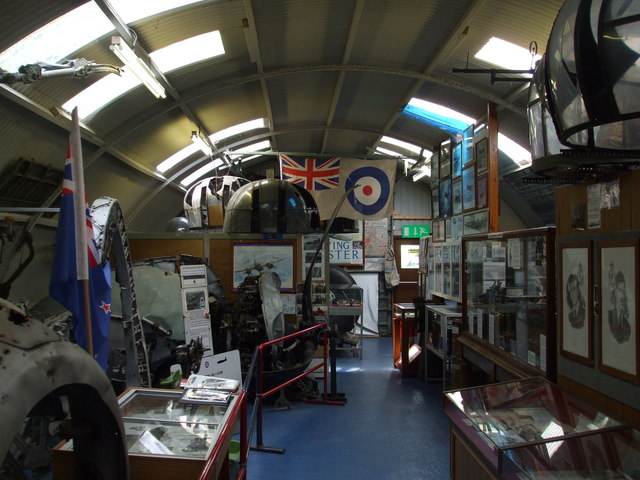
A view inside part of the Flixton Air Museum

With the end of military control Bungay airfield was the location of the Martlesham Heath Parachute Club, with Cessna 182 G-ATNU and crop sprayers, including Pawnee D G-BFRY. In 1981-82, the Flixton Church Roof Restoration Fund held mini air shows. Until 1983, the main runway and peritrack were in good condition, but the following year work started on breaking them up.

In the spring of 1986 a new set of oak gates were hung at St Mary's Church, Flixton, which stands close to the old airfield. These were bought as a result of donations by veterans of the 446th BG to replace those originally presented in 1945 by the Americans at Flixton. A small memorial plaque carries the inscription, "These gates were presented in memory of the men of the 446th Bombardment Group, USAAF, who gave their lives in the defence of freedom, 1941-1945".

== Current use ==
Of the airfield itself, most of the wartime buildings, including the control tower and hangars, have long since been demolished and the airfield has largely returned to agricultural use. Several buildings in the technical site survive, with wartime paintings on the inside walls of the former dining hall.

An organization called the USAAF Heritage Trust announced plans to preserve the remaining buildings at the base.

The former airfield is the home of 2 Sisters Food Group Buxted Chickens factory. There is also a large mushroom farm. In the early 2000s, Bungay's largest employer Clays, then part of St Ives Group, failed to gain planning permission to re-site their printing factory on the airfield.

=== Norfolk and Suffolk Aviation Museum ===
An aircraft museum has been established since 1972 next to the Buck Inn, Flixton, approximately 1 mile (1.6 km) northwest of the airfield site. It contains many displays of aircraft and other aviation artefacts, including much on the 446th Bomb Group.

== See also ==
- List of former Royal Air Force stations
