= 924th Fighter Group =

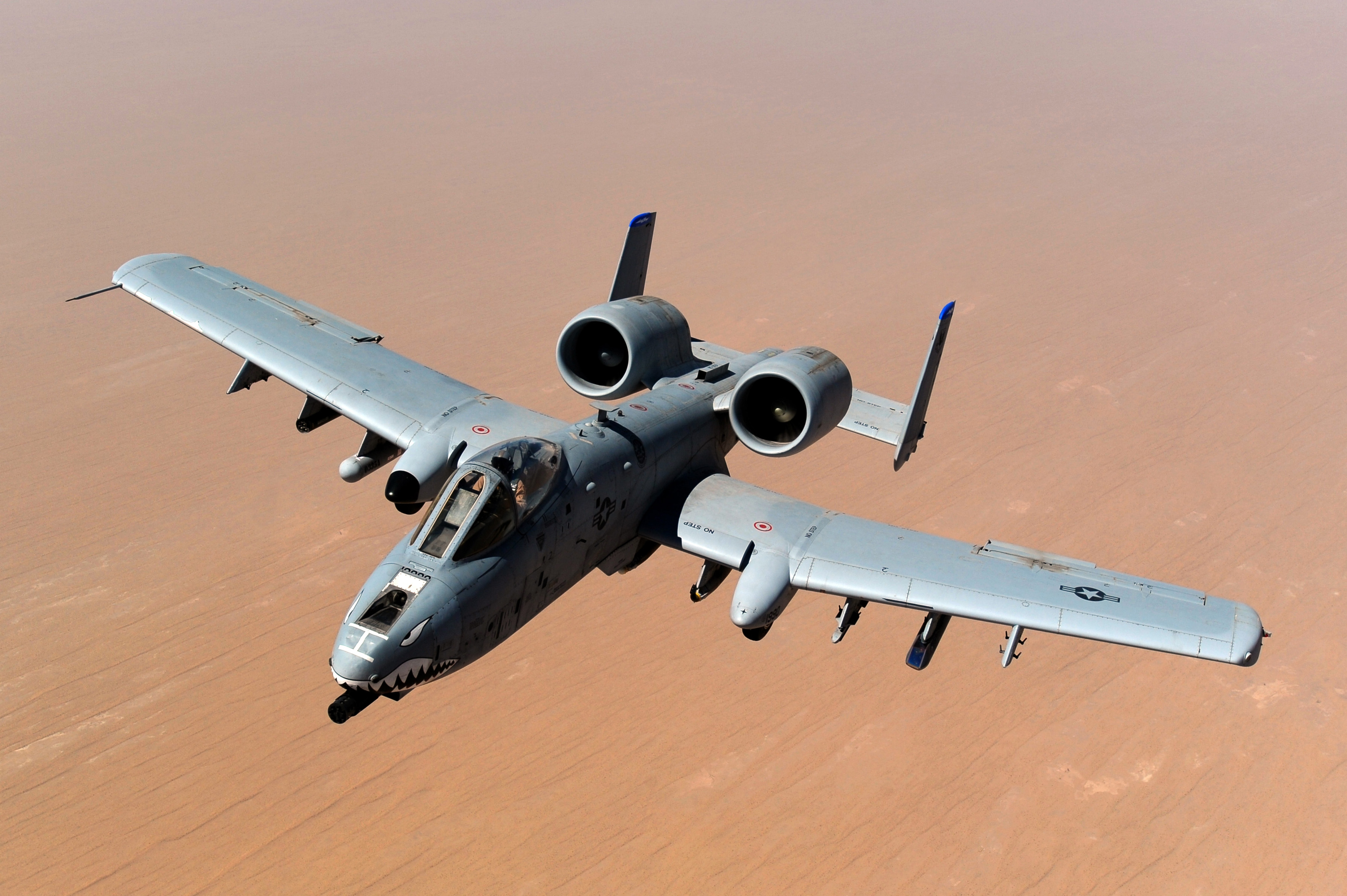
- A-10C Thunderbolt II which the 924th Fighter Group operated between 2011 and 2025.
- Active: 1963–1996; 2011–2025
- Country: United States
- Branch: United States Air Force

Insignia
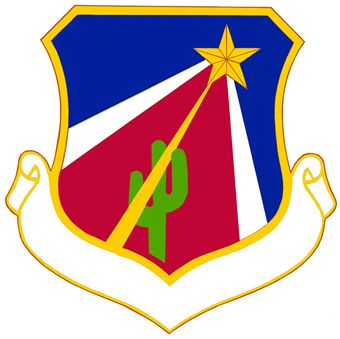
- 924th Fighter Group emblem (Note: approved 27 July 1983.)

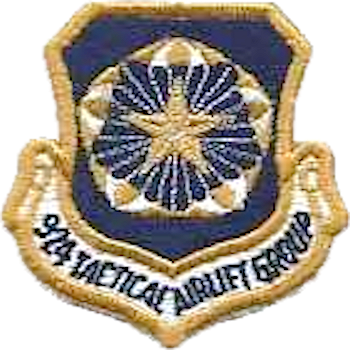
- Patch with 924th Tactical Airlift Group emblem

The 924th Fighter Group formerly the 924th Fighter Wing is a inactive group of the United States Air Force Reserve. It was inactivated on 6 September 2025. It was last assigned to the Tenth Air Force and stationed at Davis-Monthan Air Force Base, Arizona as a geographically separated unit of the Air Force Reserve Command's 944th Fighter Wing at Luke Air Force Base, Arizona. The 924th last flew the A-10 Thunderbolt II aircraft.

Until its inactivation in 1994, the group was based at the former Bergstrom Air Force Base, Texas, the 924th was a subordinate command of Tenth Air Force and was inactivated as a wing on 27 September 1996 concurrent with Bergstrom's closure due to 1995 Base Realignment and Closure Commission action.

== History ==
=== Need for reserve troop carrier groups ===
After May 1959, the reserve flying force consisted of 45 troop carrier squadrons assigned to 15 troop carrier wings. (Note: There were an additional four rescue squadrons not assigned to the wings. Cantwell, p. 156.)The squadrons were not all located with their parent wings, but were spread over thirty-five Air Force, Navy and civilian airfields under what was called the Detached Squadron Concept. The concept offered several advantages. Communities were more likely to accept the smaller squadrons than the large wings and the location of separate squadrons in smaller population centers would facilitate recruiting and manning. However, under this concept, all support organizations were located with the wing headquarters. Although this was not a problem when the entire wing was called to active service, mobilizing a single flying squadron and elements to support it proved difficult. This weakness was demonstrated in the partial mobilization of reserve units during the Berlin Crisis of 1961. To resolve this, at the start of 1962, Continental Air Command, (ConAC) determined to reorganize its reserve wings by establishing groups with support elements for each of its troop carrier squadrons. This reorganization would facilitate mobilization of elements of wings in various combinations when needed.

=== Activation of the 924th Troop Carrier Group ===
As a result, the 924th Troop Carrier Group was activated at Ellington Air Force Base, Texas on 17 January 1963 as the headquarters for the 704th Troop Carrier Squadron, which had been stationed there since May 1955. Along with group headquarters, a combat support squadron, materiel squadron and a tactical infirmary were organized to support the 705th.

The group was one of three Fairchild C-119 Flying Boxcar groups assigned to the 446th Troop Carrier Wing in 1963, the others being the 925th Troop Carrier Group, also at Ellington and the 926th Troop Carrier Group at Naval Air Station New Orleans, Louisiana.

The 924th flew experimental drop missions in support of the National Aeronautics and Space Administration from 1963 to 1967 and was also part of the USAF Combat Crew Training School, the first Air Force Reserve institution that trained active duty crews. The 924th retired their C-119 Flying Boxcars in 1967, upgrading to the newer Lockheed C-130A Hercules. The 924th ferried C-130s to Taiwan in 1966 and to Southeast Asia from 1968 to 1970, with unit members flying more than 120 missions to Southeast Asia during the Vietnam War. The unit transferred to Military Airlift Command (MAC) control in 1974 and moved to Bergstrom Air Force Base, Texas in 1976 as part of the USAF pullout from Ellington and turnover of the installation to the Texas Air National Guard as Ellington Field ANGB. At Bergstrom, the unit became the first Air Force Reserve unit assigned, and was upgraded to the newer C-130B.

=== Fighter operations ===
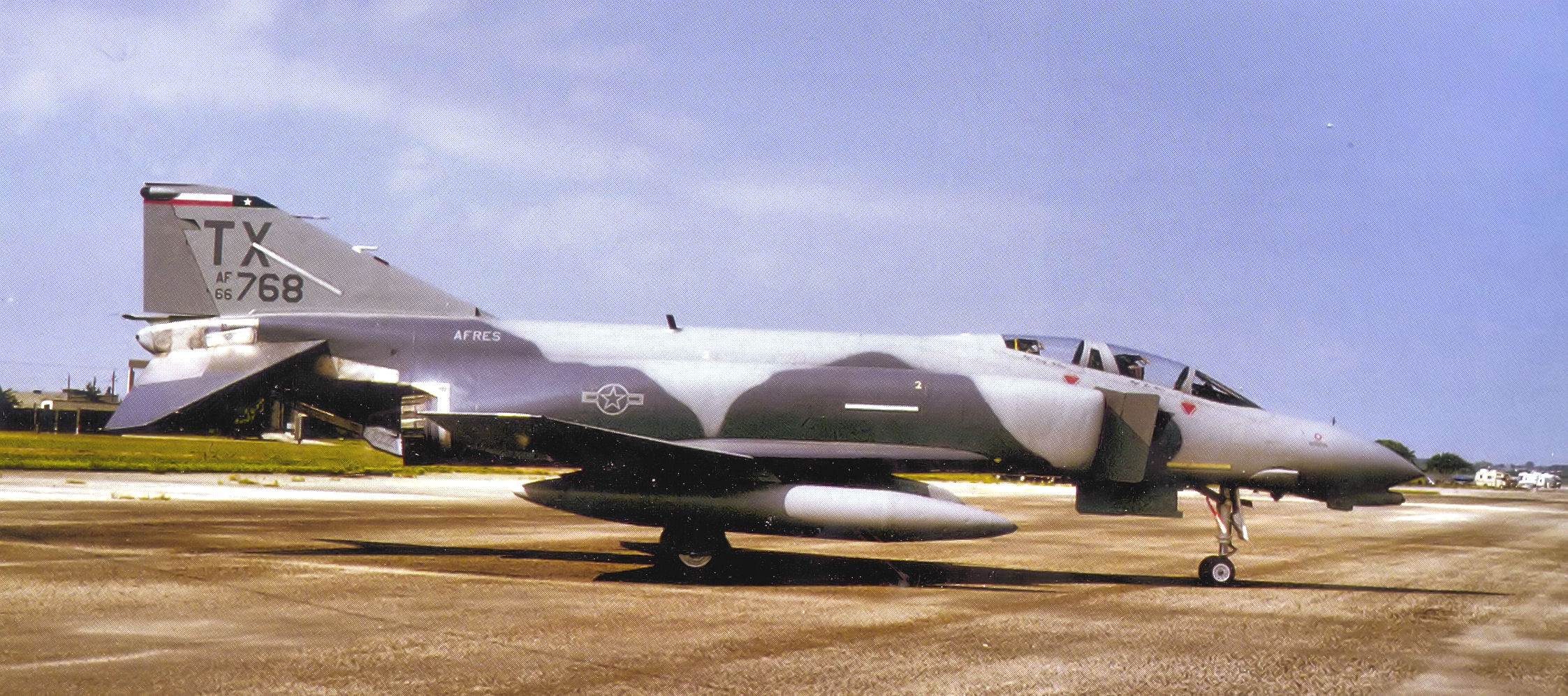
McDonnell Douglas F-4D Phantom II at Bergstrom AFB, TX, 1990 (Note: aft is McDonnell F-4D-32-MC Phantom II Serial No. 66-8768. This aircraft is now on display in front of a VFW post in Bastrop, TX.)

In 1981, the 924th was transferred back to TAC and realigned as the 924th Tactical Fighter Group, converting to the McDonnell F-4 Phantom II. With the mission change, the 924th was reassigned to the Air Force Reserve's 301st Tactical Fighter Wing at Carswell Air Force Base, while the 924th remained at Bergstrom. The 924th trained with the F-4D throughout the 1980s, being upgraded to the F-4E in 1989. With the retirement of all F-4 Phantom IIs from Air Force, Air Force Reserve and Air National Guard service in the early 1990s, the 924th was re-equipped with the Block 15 General Dynamics F-16A Fighting Falcon in 1991. The 924th was the last USAF F-4E Phantom II organization in Air Force Reserve service.

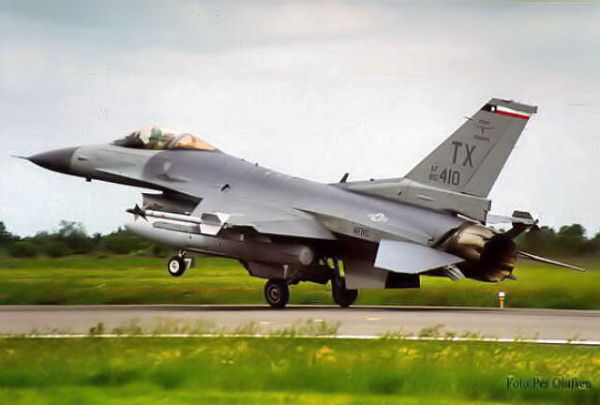
457th FS General Dynamics F-16C Block 30 Fighting Falcon, AF Ser. No. 85-1410

Renamed the 924th Fighter Group, in 1994 the 924th's equipment was again upgraded to the front-line Block 32 F-16Cs and the unit was upgraded as the 924th Fighter Wing and coming under the direct command of Tenth Air Force. However, with the end of the Cold War, Bergstrom was on the list of bases to be closed under the 1995 Base Realignment and Closure Commission process, and the 924th Fighter Wing was inactivated in September 1996 with the base's closure. Most of the 924th's F-16s were reassigned to the California Air National Guard's 144th Fighter Wing.

In 2011, the unit was reactivated as the 924th Fighter Group at Davis-Monthan Air Force Base, Arizona. As part of the Air Force Reserve Command, the 924th was assigned to the 442d Fighter Wing at Whiteman Air Force Base, and is now a unit of the 944th Fighter Wing. The 924th currently flies the Fairchild Republic A-10 Thunderbolt II close air support aircraft. The group is an associate of the 355th Fighter Wing and conducts formal training on the A-10.

The group was inactivated on 6 September 2025 as part of the wider drawdown of the USAF's A-10 fleet.

== Lineage ==
- Established as the 924th Troop Carrier Group, Medium and activated on 28 December 1962 (not organized)

Organized in the Reserve on 17 January 1963
Redesignated 924th Tactical Airlift Group on 1 July 1967
Redesignated 924th Tactical Fighter Group on 1 April 1981
Redesignated 924th Fighter Group on 1 February 1992
Redesignated 924th Fighter Wing on 1 October 1994
Inactivated on 27 September 1996

- Redesignated 924th Fighter Group on 15 December 2010

Activated on 1 January 2011
Inactivated on 6 September 2025

=== Assignments ===
- Continental Air Command, 28 December 1963 (not organized)
- 446th Troop Carrier Wing, 17 January 1963 – 1 July 1972
- 433d Tactical Airlift Wing, 1 July 1972 – 1 April 1981
- 301st Tactical Fighter Wing (later Fighter Wing), 1 April 1981 – 1 October 1994
- Tenth Air Force, 1 October 1994 – 27 September 1996
- 442d Fighter Wing, 1 January 2011 – 1 October 2012
- 944th Fighter Wing, 1 October 2012 – 6 September 2025

=== Components ===
- 45th Fighter Squadron, 1 January 2011 – present
- 704th Troop Carrier (later Tactical Airlift, Tactical Fighter, Fighter) Squadron, 28 December 1963 – 27 September 1996
- 705th Tactical Airlift Training Squadron, 1 September 1972 – 30 June 1976
- 924th Maintenance Squadron, 1 January 2011 – 6 September 2025

=== Stations ===
- Ellington Air Force Base, Texas, 17 January 1963
- Bergstrom Air Force Base, Texas, 1 March 1976 – 27 September 1996
- Davis-Monthan Air Force Base, Arizona, 1 January 2011 – 6 September 2025

=== Aircraft ===
- Fairchild C-119 Flying Boxcar, 1963–1967
- Lockheed C-130A Hercules, 1967–1976
- Lockheed C-130B Hercules, 1976–1981
- McDonnell F-4D Phantom II, 1981–1989
- McDonnell F-4E Phantom II, 1989–1991
- General Dynamics F-16A Fighting Falcon, 1991–1994
- General Dynamics F-16C Fighting Falcon, 1994–1996
- Fairchild Republic A-10C Thunderbolt II, 2011–2025
