= 446th Operations Group =

446th Operations Group

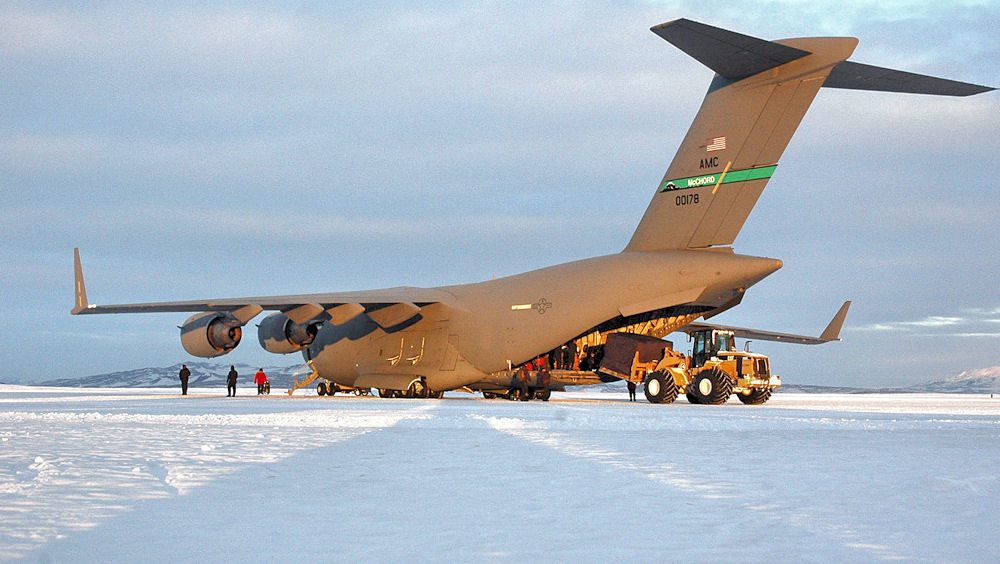
- C-17 Globemaster III from the 446th and 62nd Airlift Wings loading cargo at McMurdo Station, Antarctica during Operation Deep Freeze
- Active: 1943–1945; 1948–1951; 1955–1959; 1992–present
- Country: United States
- Branch: United States Air Force
- Role: Airlift
- Garrison/HQ: McChord AFB, Washington
- Nickname: Bungay Buckaroos (World War II) (Note: The Army Air Forces referred to the group station as Fixton, but it was also called RAF Bungay, after a nearby village.)
- Mottos: Voler Venger Vaincre (French for 'Fly, Avenge, Conquer') (World War II)
- Engagements: European theater of World War II
- Decorations: Air Force Meritorious Unit Award

Commanders
- Ceremonial chief: Air Force Reserve Command

Insignia
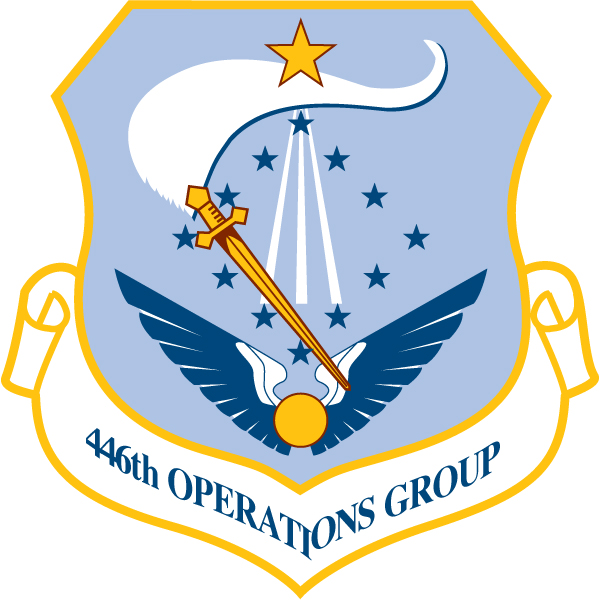
- 446th Operations Group (Note: Approved 3 August 1960 for the 446th Troop Carrier Wing. The group uses the wing emblem with the group designation on the scroll while assigned to the wing. Robertson, AFHRA Factsheet)

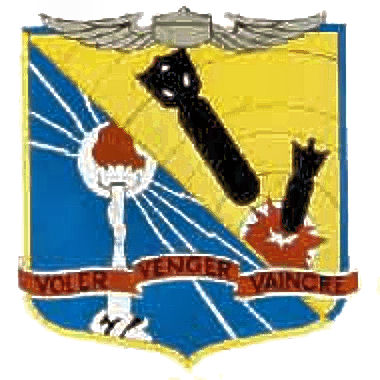
- 446th Bombardment Group emblem
- World War II tail code: Circle H

The 446th Operations Group is a United States Air Force Reserve unit assigned to the 446th Airlift Wing. It is stationed at McChord Air Force Base, Washington.

The group was first activated as the 446th Bombardment Group and served in combat as an Eighth Air Force B-24 Liberator unit in England. In 1944 the group led Eighth Air Force and the 2d Bombardment Division on the first heavy bomber mission of D-Day. (Note: Consolidated B-24H, serial 42-95203, FL-D Red Ass of the group's 704th Bombardment Squadron was the lead plane.) The group's 706th Bombardment Squadron flew 62 consecutive missions and 707th Bombardment Squadron had 68 missions without loss. After V-E Day the group returned to the United States, where it was inactivated in August 1945.

The group was activated again in the Air Force Reserve in 1948 at Carswell Air Force Base, Texas. It trained alongside the active duty 7th Bombardment Group until 1951 when it was called to active duty so that its personnel could be used as fillers for other units, then it was inactivated.

In 1955 the group was again activated in the reserve as the 446th Troop Carrier Group at Ellington Air Force Base, Texas. It was inactivated in 1959 when Continental Air Command reorganized its wings under the dual deputy model, which eliminated operational and maintenance group headquarters.

The group was activated a fourth time in 1992 as the command element for the flying units of the 446th Airlift Wing as reserve units reorganized under the Objective Wing organizational model.

== Overview ==
The 446th Operations Group was activated at McChord Air Force Base on 1 August 1992 under the United States Air Force Objective Wing organizational model. The operational squadrons of the 446th Airlift Wing were reassigned to the newly established group and an operational support squadron was activated along with the group. Since 1992, the group has flown channel, special assignment, and humanitarian airlift missions worldwide and taken part in joint and combined exercises, both within the United States and abroad. The group is an associate of the regular 62d Operations Group and the units fly the same aircraft, which carry the emblems of their parent wings. The group flew the Lockheed C-141 Starlifter until it was phased out in 2002, but began transitioning into the McDonnell Douglas C-17 Globemaster III in 1999.

The 446th Operations Group manages the aircrew and flight operations of the 446th Airlift Wing. The group is made up of five squadrons:

- 97th Airlift Squadron (C-17 Globemaster III)
- 313th Airlift Squadron (C-17 Globemaster III)
- 728th Airlift Squadron (C-17 Globemaster III)
- 446th Aeromedical Evacuation Squadron
- 446th Operations Support Squadron

== History ==
=== World War II ===
==== Training for combat ====
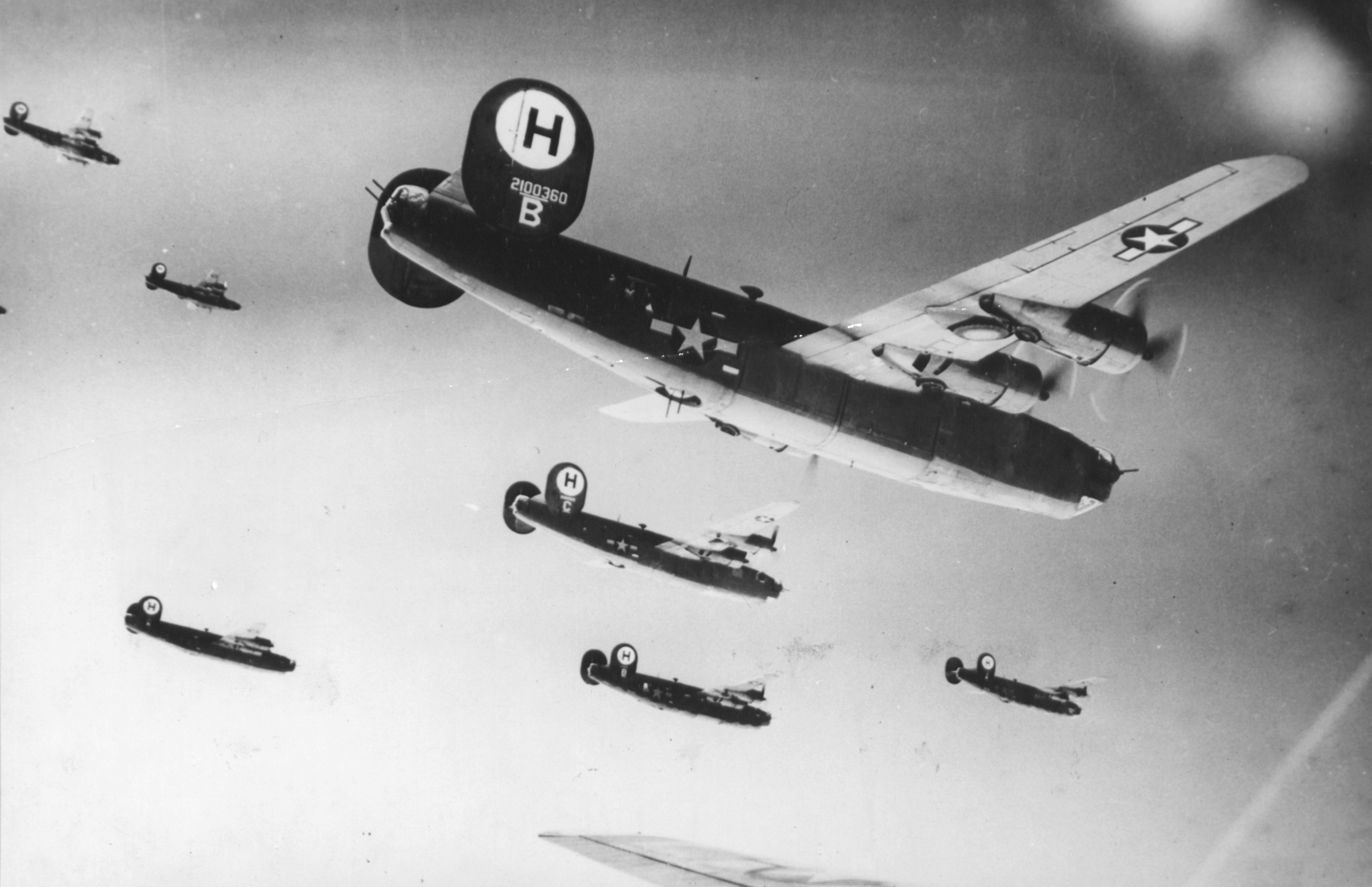
446th Bomb Group Liberators on their way to a target. (Note: Identifiable is Consolidated B-24H Liberator, serial 42-7607.)

The group was first activated on 1 April 1943 at Davis–Monthan Field, Arizona as the 446th Bombardment Group with an initial cadre drawn from the 39th Bombardment Group. Its original squadrons were the 704th, 705th, 706th, and 707th Bombardment Squadrons. The cadre departed for Orlando Army Air Base, Florida for training with the Army Air Forces School of Applied Tactics, where they flew simulated combat missions from Montbrook Army Air Field.

The unit headed for Alamogordo Army Air Field, New Mexico in June 1943, but was diverted to Lowry Field, Colorado, where the group was filled out and advanced training was completed. The group lost two aircraft to crashes during this training. The ground echelon left Lowry on 18 October 1943 for Camp Shanks, New York and embarked on the RMS Queen Mary, sailing on 27 October 1943 and arrived in Greenock on the Firth of Clyde on 2 November 1943. The aircraft left Lowry on 20 October 1943 for staging at Lincoln Army Air Field, Nebraska. The aircrews ferried their planes under the control of Air Transport Command via the southern route from Florida through Puerto Rico, Brazil, Senegal, and Morocco to England. The 446th was the first Army Air Forces group to complete the Transatlantic hop from Brazil to Africa without the installation of additional bomb bay fuel tanks.

==== Combat in the European theater ====
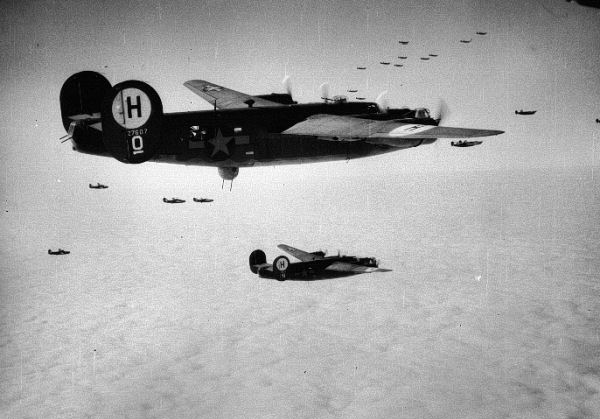
446th Bomb Group Liberators on their way to a target. (Note: Identifiable is Consolidated B-24J Liberator, serial 42-100360. This aircraft was shot down 29 April 1944 on a mission to Berlin.)

The 446th suffered its first combat loss even before arriving in England when the aircraft commanded by 2nd Lt. Samuel E. Fowlkes strayed from the planned route and flew too close to the Brest Peninsula, where it was attacked by Focke-Wulf Fw 190 and Junkers Ju 88 fighters and anti-aircraft fire from the Luftwaffe and was shot down. The remainder of the group safely arrived at its new base at RAF Flixton in the east of England.

The group arrived at its combat station, RAF Flixton in early November 1943 and flew its first mission on 16 December 1943 against shipping facilities in Bremen, Germany, losing one airplane that crashed just short of the field due to fuel exhaustion. The group operated chiefly against strategic objectives. Its targets included Its targets included ball bearing factories at Berlin, marshalling yards at Koblenz, submarine pens at Kiel, aircraft plants at Munich, port facilities at Ludwigshafen and aircraft engine manufacturing plants at Rostock. The group's 706th Bombardment Squadron flew 62 consecutive missions and 707th Bombardment Squadron had 68 missions without loss.

The group was occasionally diverted from strategic missions to carry out air support and interdiction missions. It supported Operation Overlord, the invasion of Normandy by attacking transportation targets, including bridges, along with airfields and strong points in France. On D Day, the squadron and the rest of the 446th Group led the first heavy bomber mission of the day. The 446th aided ground forces at Caen and Saint-Lô during July by hitting bridges, gun batteries, and enemy troops. During Operation Market Garden, the attempt to seize a bridgehead across the Rhine in the Netherlands, the 704th dropped supplies to allied troops near Nijmegen. It struck lines of communications during the Battle of the Bulge. During Operation Varsity in March 1945, it supplied ground and airborne troops near Wesel. The squadron flew its last combat mission on 25 April 1945 against Salzburg, Austria. The group had flown 273 missions and had lost 58 aircraft during the war,

After V-E Day, the 446th flew transport missions to France, sometimes landing at fields that had been targets the previous year. It also flew "Trolley" missions, transporting support personnel for "sightseeing" trips over Germany to view the results of their efforts. The group began to redeploy to the US in June 1945. The first aircraft of the air echelon departed the United Kingdom in mid-June 1945 flying the northern route via Iceland. One aircraft was lost over the Azores on the return flight. The ground echelon sailed from Greenock on the Queen Mary on 6 July 1945 and arrived in New York on 11 July 1945. Personnel were given 30 days leave. The ground and air echelons reassembled at Sioux Falls Army Air Field, South Dakota in late July. Its personnel were transferred to other Second Air Force units or demobilized and the Group was inactivated on 28 August 1945.

=== Reserve operations ===
==== Corollary unit ====
The group was reactivated in March 1948 at Carswell AFB near Fort Worth, Texas, along with the 704th 705th and 706th squadrons, although the 706th was located across the state at Biggs Air Force Base near El Paso. The following month the 707th squadron was activated at Lubbock Air Force Base, in the Texas panhandle. The group conducted bombardment training with as part of the Air Force Reserve, but does not appear to have been assigned any aircraft of its own during this period. In June 1949 the group lost its two remote squadrons when the 706th was inactivated and the 707th was transferred. Simultaneously, the group was reassigned from Continental Air Command to Strategic Air Command and became a corollary of the active duty 7th Bombardment Group, which had just converted from the Boeing B-29 Superfortress to the Convair B-36 Peacemaker. As a result of the Korean War, the group was called to active duty on 1 May 1951. Its personnel were reassigned to other units and the group was inactivated on 25 June 1951.

==== Airlift operations ====
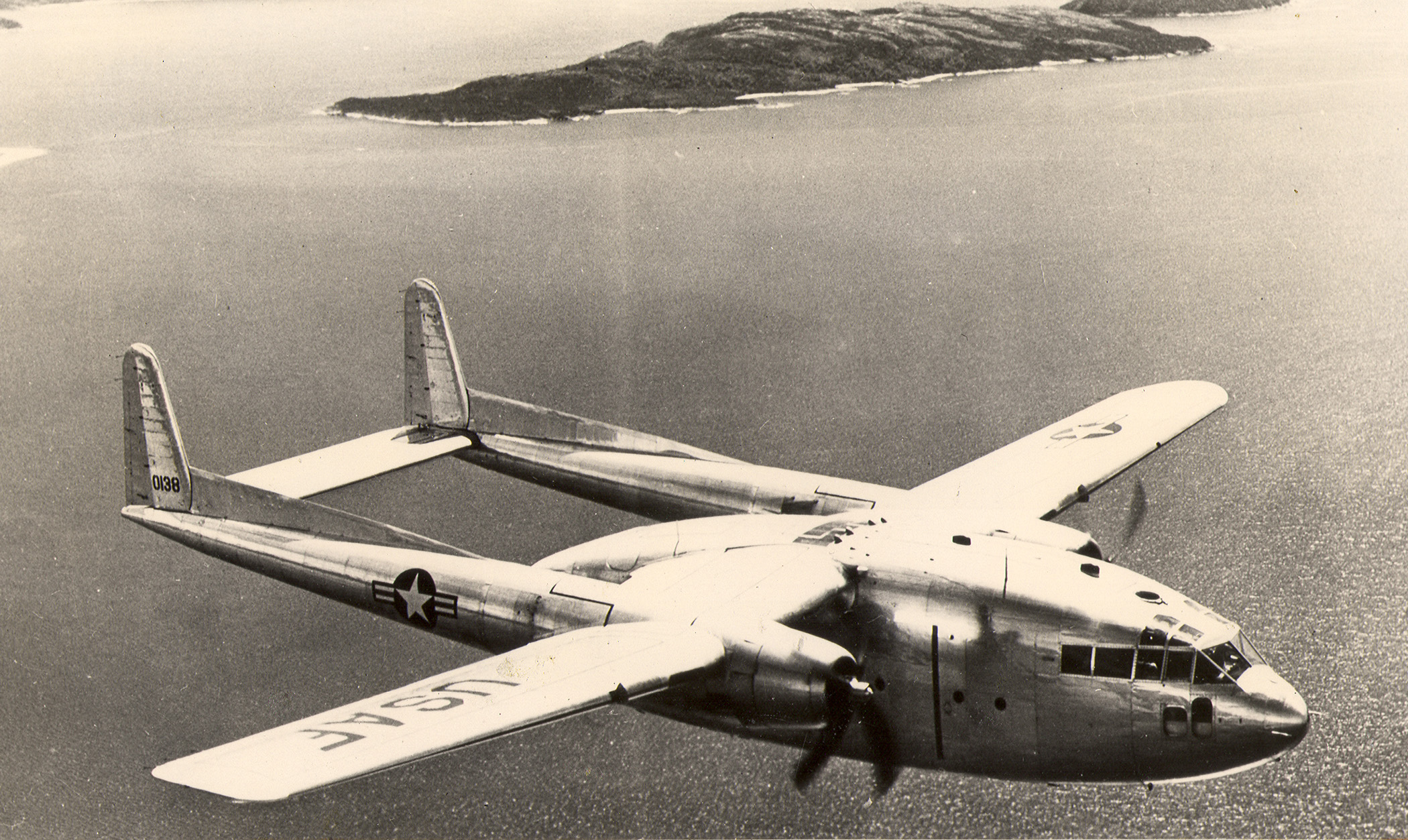
Fairchild C-119 of the Air Force Reserve

Reserve flying organizations began to be reformed in July 1952. However, the Air Force desired that all reserve units be designed to augment the regular forces in the event of a national emergency. The six reserve pilot training wings, including the 8706th Pilot Training Wing at Ellington Air Force Base, Texas, however, had no mobilization mission. On 18 May 1955, the 8706th Wing was replaced by the 446th Troop Carrier Wing. The group was reactivated as the 446th Troop Carrier Group, along with the 704th and 705th Troop Carrier Squadrons and initially equipped with Curtiss C-46 Commandos. At Ellington it absorbed the personnel of the 8706th Pilot Training Group, which was simultaneously discontinued. In October the 706th TCS at Donaldson Air Force Base, South Carolina activated and joined the group, but it inactivated in November 1957. In 1958 the group upgraded to Fairchild C-119 Flying Boxcar aircraft and gained the 357th Troop Carrier Squadron at New Orleans Naval Air Station, and in 1959 the 706th was activated again, this time at Barksdale Air Force Base. The unit trained for and flew airlift missions until being inactivated in 1959 when its parent unit, the 446th Troop Carrier Wing converted to the dual deputy organization, which eliminated operational and maintenance group headquarters. (Note: Under this plan flying squadrons reported to the wing Deputy Commander for Operations and maintenance squadrons reported to the wing Deputy Commander for Maintenance.) The group's squadrons were reassigned directly to the Wing.

In 1992, Air Force Reserve Command reorganized its flying wings under the Objective Wing system, and in August, the group was reactivated at McChord Air Force Base, Washington as the 446th Operations Group, a reserve associate of the 62d Operations Group.

== Lineage ==
- Established as the 446th Bombardment Group (Heavy) on 20 March 1943

Activated on 1 April 1943
Redesignated 446th Bombardment Group, Heavy on 20 August 1943
Inactivated on 28 August 1945

- Redesignated 446th Bombardment Group, Very Heavy on 26 September 1947

Activated in the reserve on 26 March 1948
Redesignated 446th Bombardment Group, Heavy on 27 June 1949
Ordered to Active Duty on 1 May 1951
Inactivated on 25 June 1951

- Redesignated 446th Troop Carrier Group, Medium on 11 April 1955

Activated in the reserve on 25 May 1955
Inactivated on 14 April 1959

- Redesignated 446th Military Airlift Group on 31 July 1985 (Remained inactive)
- Redesignated 446th Operations Group on 1 August 1992

Activated in the reserve on 1 August 1992

=== Assignments ===
- Second Air Force, 1 April 1943
- II Bomber Command, April 1943
- Second Air Force, 6 October 1943
- Eighth Air Force, c. 2 November 1943
- VIII Bomber Command, 5 November 1943
- 2d Bombardment Division, 9 November 1943
- 20th Combat Bombardment Wing, November 1943
- 96th Combat Bombardment Wing (later 96th Bombardment Wing), 1 June 1945
- Second Air Force, 15 July 1945 – 28 August 1945
- 309th Bombardment Wing (later 309th Air Division), 26 March 1948
- Eighth Air Force, 27 June 1949 – 25 June 1951
- 446th Troop Carrier Wing, 25 May 1955 – 14 April 1959
- 446th Airlift Wing, 1 August 1992 – present

=== Components ===
- 36th Aerial Port Squadron: 1 August 1992 – 1 October 2002
- 40th Aeromedical Evacuation Squadron: 1 August 1992 – 1 October 1994
- 97th Airlift Squadron: 1 August 1992 – present
- 313th Airlift Squadron: 1 August 1992 – present
- 357th Troop Carrier Squadron: 25 March 1958 – 14 April 1959

Located at New Orleans Naval Air Station, Louisiana

- 446th Aeromedical Evacuation Squadron: 1 October 1994 – present
- 446th Operations Squadron (later 446th Operations Flight): 1 August 1992 – present
- 704th Bombardment Squadron (later 704th Troop Carrier Squadron): 1 April 1943 – 28 August 1945; 26 March 1948 – 25 June 1951; 25 May 1955 – 14 April 1959
- 705th Bombardment Squadron (later 705th Troop Carrier Squadron): 1 April 1943 – 28 August 1945; 26 March 1948 – 25 June 1951; 25 May 1955 – 14 April 1959
- 706th Bombardment Squadron (later 706th Troop Carrier Squadron): 1 April 1943 – 28 August 1945; 26 March 1948 – 27 June 1949; 8 October 1955 – 16 November 1957; 7 February 1959– 14 April 1959

Located at Biggs AFB, Texas, 26 March 1948 – 27 June 1949
Located at Donaldson AFB, South Carolina, 8 October 1955 – 16 November 1957
Located at Barksdale AFB, Louisiana, 7 February 1959 – 14 April 1959

- 707th Bombardment Squadron: 1 April 1943 – 28 August 1945; 22 April 1948 – 27 June 1949

Located at Lubbock AFB, Texas, 22 April 1948 – 27 June 1949

- 728th Airlift Squadron: 1 August 1992 – present
- 446th Airlift Control Flight: 1 August 1992 – present

=== Stations ===
- Davis–Monthan Field, Arizona, 1 April 1943
- Lowry Field, Colorado, 8 June 1943 – 19 October 1943
- RAF Flixton (USAAF Station 125), England, 2 November 1943 – 6 July 1945
- Sioux Falls Army Air Field, South Dakota, 15 July 1945 – 28 August 1945
- Carswell Air Force Base, Texas, 26 March 1948 – 25 June 1951
- Ellington Air Force Base, Texas, 25 May 1955 – 14 April 1959
- McChord Air Force Base, Washington, 1 August 1992 – present

=== Aircraft assigned ===
- Consolidated B-24 Liberator, 1943–1945
- Beechcraft C-45 Expeditor, 1955–1958
- Curtiss C-46 Commando, 1955–1958
- Fairchild C-119 Flying Boxcar, 1958–1959
- Lockheed C-141 Starlifter, 1992–2002
- McDonnell Douglas C-17 Globemaster III, 1999–present

=== Awards and campaigns ===
Award streamer	Award	Dates	Notes
	Air Force Meritorious Unit Award	1 October 2005–30 September 2006	
	Air Force Meritorious Unit Award	1 October 2006–30 September 2007	

Campaign Streamer	Campaign	Dates	Notes
	Air Offensive, Europe		
	Normandy		
	Northern France		
	Rhineland		
	Central Europe		
	Ardennes-Alsace		
