= 925th Tactical Airlift Group =

Unit of the United States Air Force Reserve

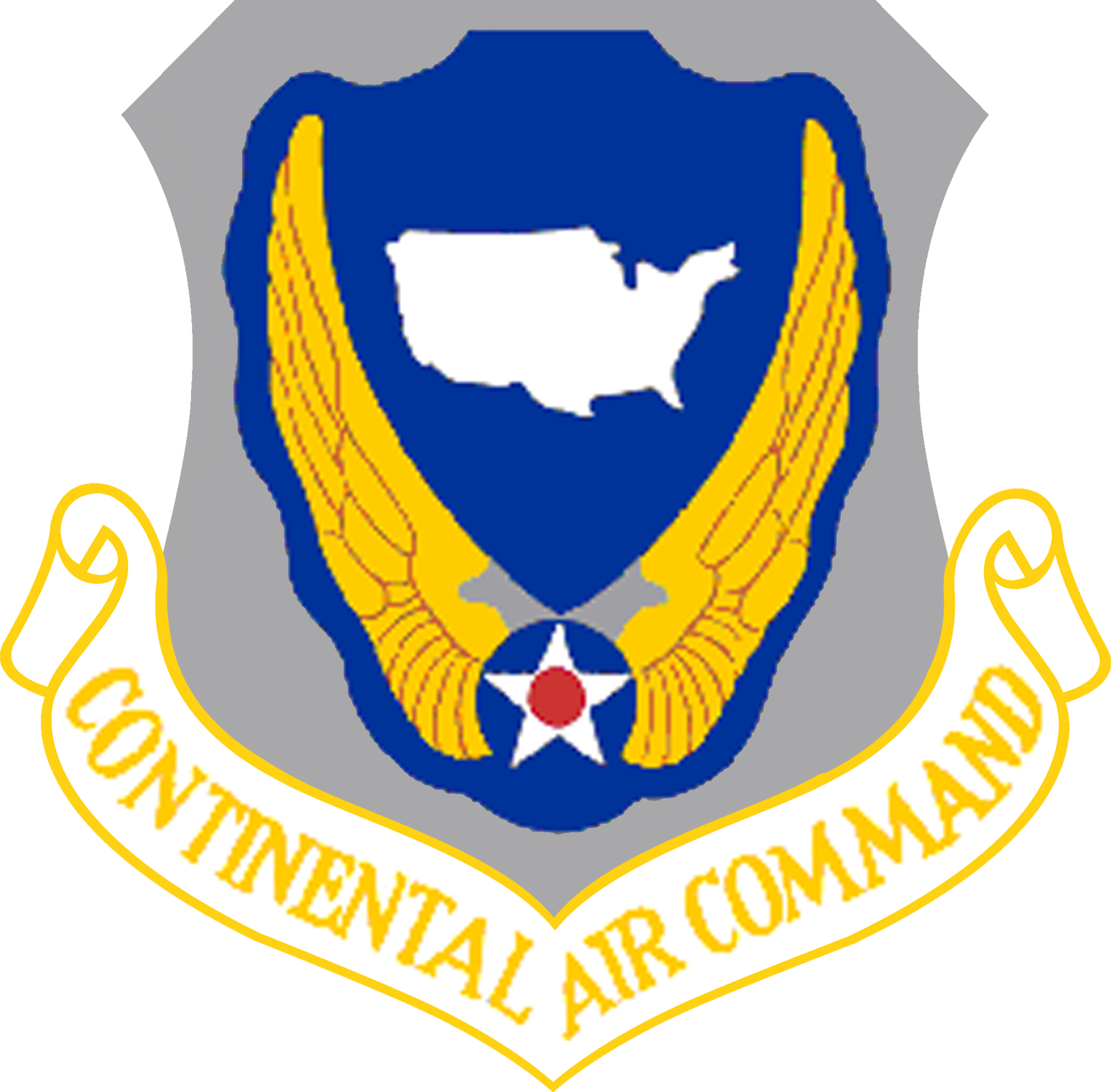
925th Tactical Airlift Group

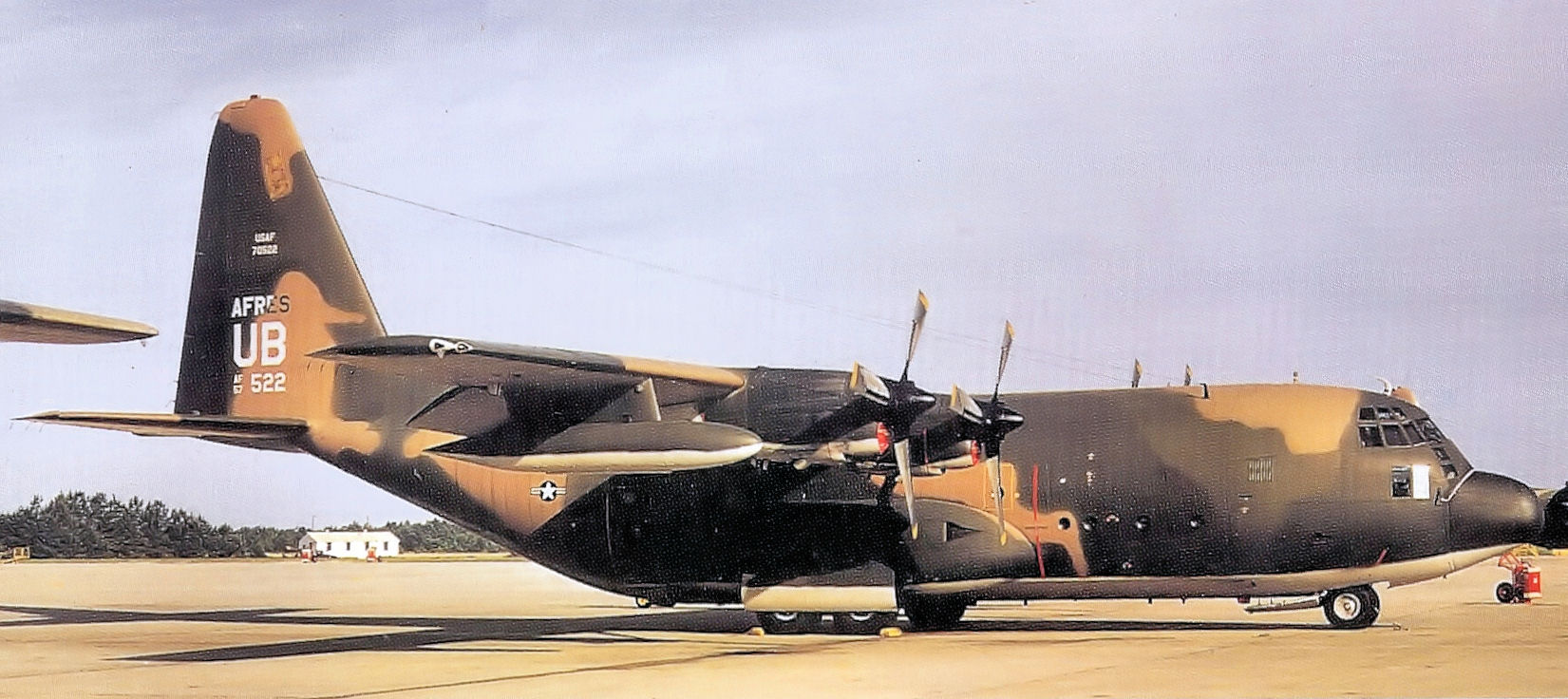
- C-130 Hercules of the Air Force Reserves (Note: Aircraft is Lockheed C-130A-55-LM Hercules serial 57-522, taken at Richards-Gebaur AFB about 1974.)
- Active: 1963–1974
- Country: United States
- Branch: United States Air Force
- Role: Airlift
- Part of: Continental Air Command

The 925th Tactical Airlift Group is an inactive United States Air Force Reserve unit. It was last active with the 446th Tactical Airlift Wing, based at Ellington Air Force Base, Texas, where it was inactivated on 25 March 1968.

== History ==
=== Need for reserve troop carrier groups ===
After May 1959, the reserve flying force consisted of 45 troop carrier squadrons assigned to 15 troop carrier wings. (Note: There were an additional four rescue squadrons not assigned to the wings. Cantwell, p. 156) The squadrons were not all located with their parent wings, but were spread over thirty-five Air Force, Navy and civilian airfields under what was called the Detached Squadron Concept. The concept offered several advantages. Communities were more likely to accept the smaller squadrons than the large wings and the location of separate squadrons in smaller population centers would facilitate recruiting and manning. However, under this concept, all support organizations were located with the wing headquarters. Although this was not a problem when the entire wing was called to active service, mobilizing a single flying squadron and elements to support it proved difficult. This weakness was demonstrated in the partial mobilization of reserve units during the Berlin Crisis of 1961. To resolve this, at the start of 1962, Continental Air Command, (ConAC) determined to reorganize its reserve wings by establishing groups with support elements for each of its troop carrier squadrons. This reorganization would facilitate mobilization of elements of wings in various combinations when needed.

=== Activation of the 925th Troop Carrier Group ===
As a result, the 925th Troop Carrier Group was activated at Ellington Air Force Base, Texas on 17 January 1963 as the headquarters for the 705th Troop Carrier Squadron, which had been stationed there since May 1955. Along with group headquarters, a Combat Support Squadron, Materiel Squadron and a Tactical Infirmary were organized to support the 705th.

If mobilized, the group was gained by Tactical Air Command (TAC), which was also responsible for its training. Its mission was to organize, recruit and train Air Force reservists with C-119 Flying Boxcars in the tactical airlift of airborne forces, their equipment and supplies and delivery of these forces and materials by airdrop, landing or cargo extraction systems.

The group was one of three C-119 groups assigned to the 446th Troop Carrier Wing in 1963, the others being the 924th Troop Carrier Group, also at Ellington and the 926th Troop Carrier Group at New Orleans Naval Air Station, Louisiana.

Flew experimental drop missions in support of the National Aeronautics and Space Administration (NASA) from 1963 to 1967. Was part of the USAF Combat Crew Training School, the first Air Force Reserve institution that trained active duty crews. Retired the Flying Boxcars in 1967, upgrading to the newer C-130A Hercules.

Unit was inactivated in 1968 by DoD budget reductions due to the Vietnam War.

== Lineage ==
- Established as the 925th Troop Carrier Group, Medium and activated on 28 December 1962 (not organized)

Organized in the reserve on 17 January 1963
Redesignated 925th Tactical Airlift Group on 1 July 1967
Inactivated on 25 March 1968

=== Assignments ===
- Continental Air Command, 28 December 1962 (not organized)
- 446th Troop Carrier Wing (later 446th Tactical Airlift Wing), 17 January 1963 – 25 March 1968

=== Components ===
- 705th Troop Carrier Squadron (later 705th Tactical Airlift Squadron), 17 January 1963 – 25 March 1968

=== Stations ===
- Ellington Air Force Base, Texas, 17 January 1963 – 25 March 1968

=== Aircraft ===
- Fairchild C-119 Flying Boxcar, 1963–1967
- Lockheed C-130A Hercules, 1967–1968
