= 313th Airlift Squadron =

313th Airlift Squadron

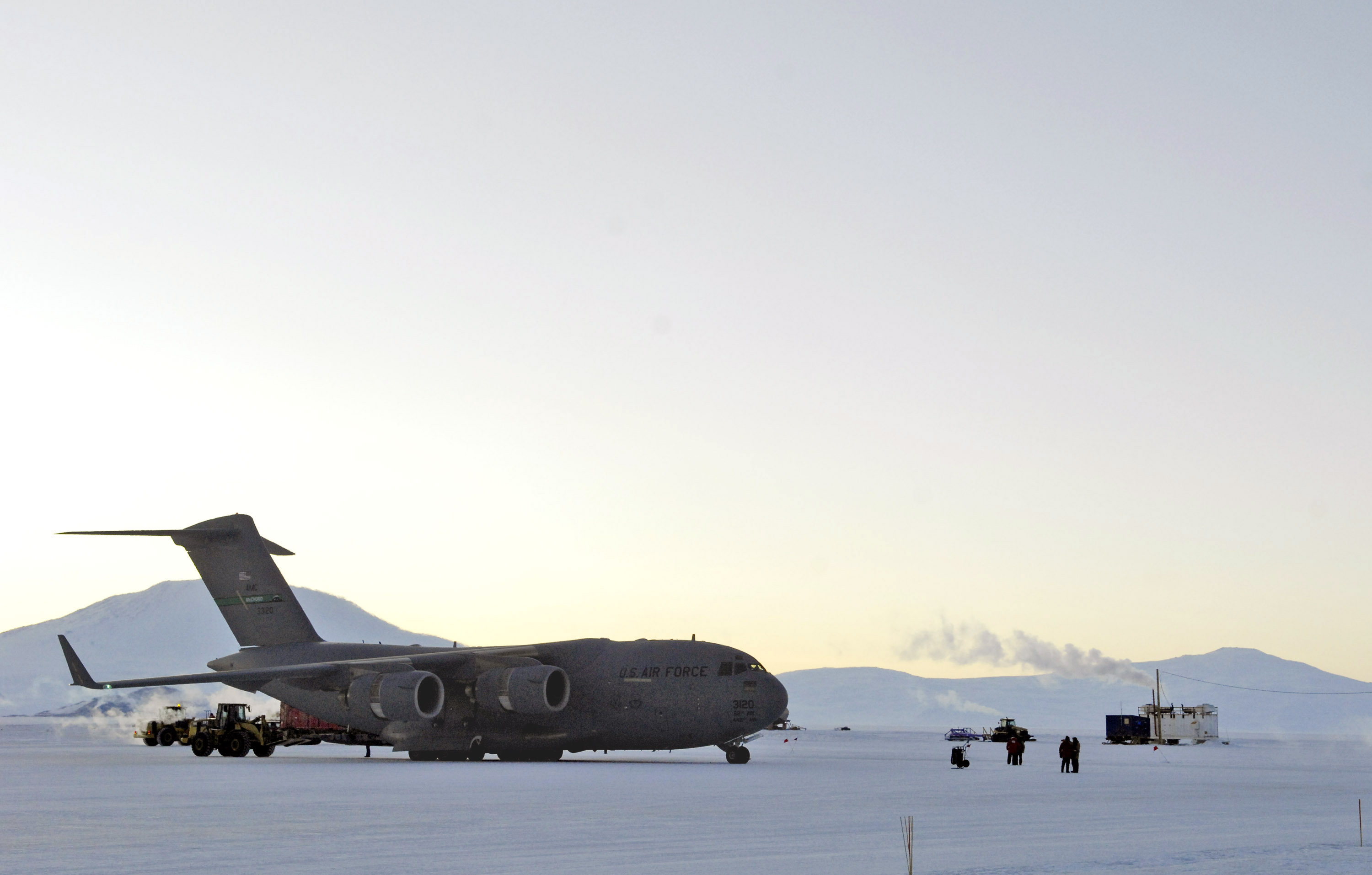
- C-17 Globemaster III from McChord AFB during Operation Deep Freeze
- Active: 1943–1946; 1949–1951; 1952–present
- Country: United States
- Branch: United States Air Force
- Role: Airlift
- Part of: Air Force Reserve Command
- Garrison/HQ: McChord Air Force Base
- Engagements: European Theater of Operations; Iraq War
- Decorations: Air Force Meritorious Unit Award; Air Force Outstanding Unit Award; Republic of Vietnam Gallantry Cross with Palm

Insignia
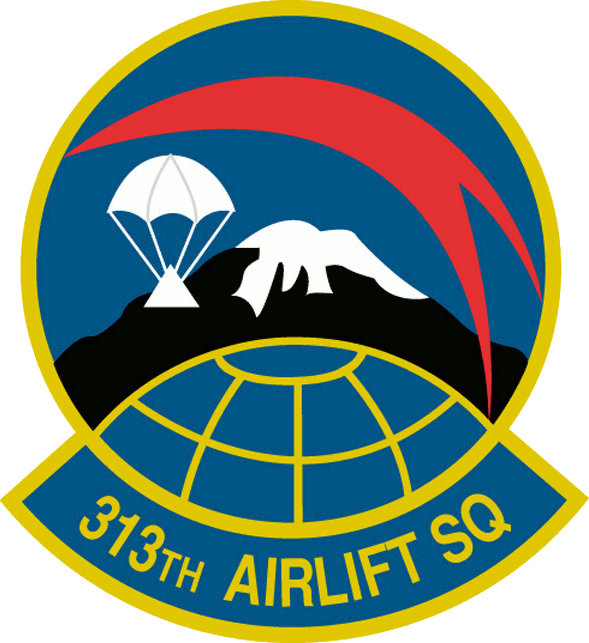
- 313th Airlift Squadron emblem (approved 23 May 1984)

The 313th Airlift Squadron is a United States Air Force Reserve squadron, assigned to the 446th Operations Group, stationed at McChord AFB, Joint Base Lewis–McChord, Washington. It is an associate unit of the active duty 7th Airlift Squadron, 62d Airlift Wing.

== Overview ==
The mission of the 313th consists of airlift and aerial delivery on a worldwide basis, flying the Boeing C-17 Globemaster III jet transport. The majority of the airlift mission is conducted in the Pacific and Alaska; however, missions are also flown to Europe, Africa, and South America.

== History ==
=== Patch history ===
In 1983, artist Larry Kangas designed the official emblem of the 313th Airlift Squadron. The insignia features a light blue disc as the background, with a black mountain capped in white snow. Emerging from the base is a blue demi-globe with yellow grid lines and outline, over which an arced horizontal flight symbol is positioned. Below this is a white parachute supporting a white triangle, all enclosed within a narrow yellow border.

=== World War II ===
The Squadron was activated in late 1943 as a Douglas C-47 Skytrain troop carrier squadron, trained under I Troop Carrier Command in the United States. It was not deployed until the spring of 1945 to England, being assigned to the IX Troop Carrier Command. It was not used in combat operations, however it did transport supplies and equipment to the front-line ground forces primarily into Germany and evacuated casualties to rear areas. It returned to the United States in September 1945 and was a transport squadron for Continental Air Forces until its inactivation in September 1946.

=== Return to airlift mission ===
On the 25 July 1968, the squadron transferred to the McChord Air Force and Base, Washing, where it was redesignated as the 313th Military Airlift Squadron as part of the 939th Military Airlift Group. At McChord, it flew the Lockheed C-141A Starlifter and with a global strategic mission, 313th aircrews saw much service providing airlift to Southeast Asia.

== Lineage ==
- Constituted as the 313th Troop Carrier Squadron on 23 October 1943

Activated on 1 November 1943
Inactivated on 7 September 1946

- Redesignated 313th Troop Carrier Squadron, Medium on 10 May 1949

Activated in the reserve on 27 June 1949
Ordered to active duty on 1 April 1951
Inactivated on 2 April 1951

- Redesignated 313th Fighter-Bomber Squadron on 26 May 1952

Activated in the reserve on 13 June 1952
Redesignated 313th Troop Carrier Squadron, Medium on 1 September 1957
Ordered to active duty on 28 October 1962
Relieved from active duty on 28 November 1962
Redesignated 313th Tactical Airlift Squadron on 1 July 1967
Redesignated 313th Military Airlift Squadron (Associate) on 25 July 1968
Redesignated 313th Airlift Squadron (Associate) on 1 February 1992
Redesignated 313th Airlift Squadron on 1 October 1994

=== Assignments ===
- 349th Troop Carrier Group, 1 November 1943 – 7 September 1946
- 349th Troop Carrier Group, 27 June 1949 – 2 April 1951
- 349th Fighter-Bomber (later 349 Troop Carrier Group), 13 June 1952
- 349th Troop Carrier Wing, 14 April 1959
- 939th Troop Carrier Group (later 939 Tactical Airlift Group, 939 Military Airlift Group), 11 February 1963
- 446th Military Airlift Wing (later 446 Airlift Wing), 1 July 1973
- 446th Operations Group, 1 August 1992 – present

=== Stations ===
- Sedalia Army Air Field, Missouri, 1 November 1943
- Alliance Army Air Field, Nebraska, 20 January 1944
- Pope Field, North Carolina, 11 March 1944
- Baer Field, Indiana, 7–15 March 1945
- RAF Barkston Heath (AAF-483), England, 30 March 1945
- Roye-Amy Airfield (A-73), France, 18 April–13 July 1945
- Bergstrom Field, Texas, 17 September 1945 – 7 September 1946
- Hamilton Air Force Base, California, 27 June 1949 – 2 April 1951
- Hamilton Air Force Base, California, 13 June 1952
- Hill Air Force Base, Utah, 14 October 1955
- Portland International Airport, Oregon, 16 November 1957
- McChord Air Force Base, Washington, 25 July 1968 – present

=== Aircraft ===
- Douglas C-53 Skytrooper, 1943–1944
- Douglas C-47 Skytrain, 1944, 1945–1946
- Curtiss C-46 Commando, 1944–1946; 1949–1951, 1957–1958
- North American F-51 Mustang, 1952–1954
- Lockheed T-33 T-Bird, 1953–1956
- Lockheed F-80 Shooting Star, 1954–1956
- Republic F-84 Thunderjet, 1956–1957
- Fairchild C-119 Flying Boxcar, 1958–1968
- Lockheed C-141 Starlifter, 1968–1996
- Boeing C-17 Globemaster III, 1996–present

=== Decorations ===
- Decorations. Air Force Outstanding Unit Award with Combat "V" Device: 1 August 2002 – 31 July 2002. Air Force Outstanding Unit Awards: 23 December 1964 – 22 January 1965; 26 January 1968 – 1 June 1969; 1 July 1974 – 30 June 1975; 1 July 1975 – 30 June 1977; 1 July 1992 – 30 June 1994; 1 July 1994 – 15 August 1995; 1 July 1996 – 30 June 1998; 1 August 2000 – 31 July 2002; 16 August 2003 – 17 August 2004; 18 August 2004 – 17 August 2005; 18 August 2005 – 17 August 2006; 18 August 2006 – 17 August 2007; 18 August 2007 – 17 August 2008; 18 August 2008 – 17 August 2009. Republic of Vietnam Gallantry Cross with Palm: 1 April 1966 – 28 January 1973.
