= 703d Helicopter Squadron =

703d Helicopter Squadron

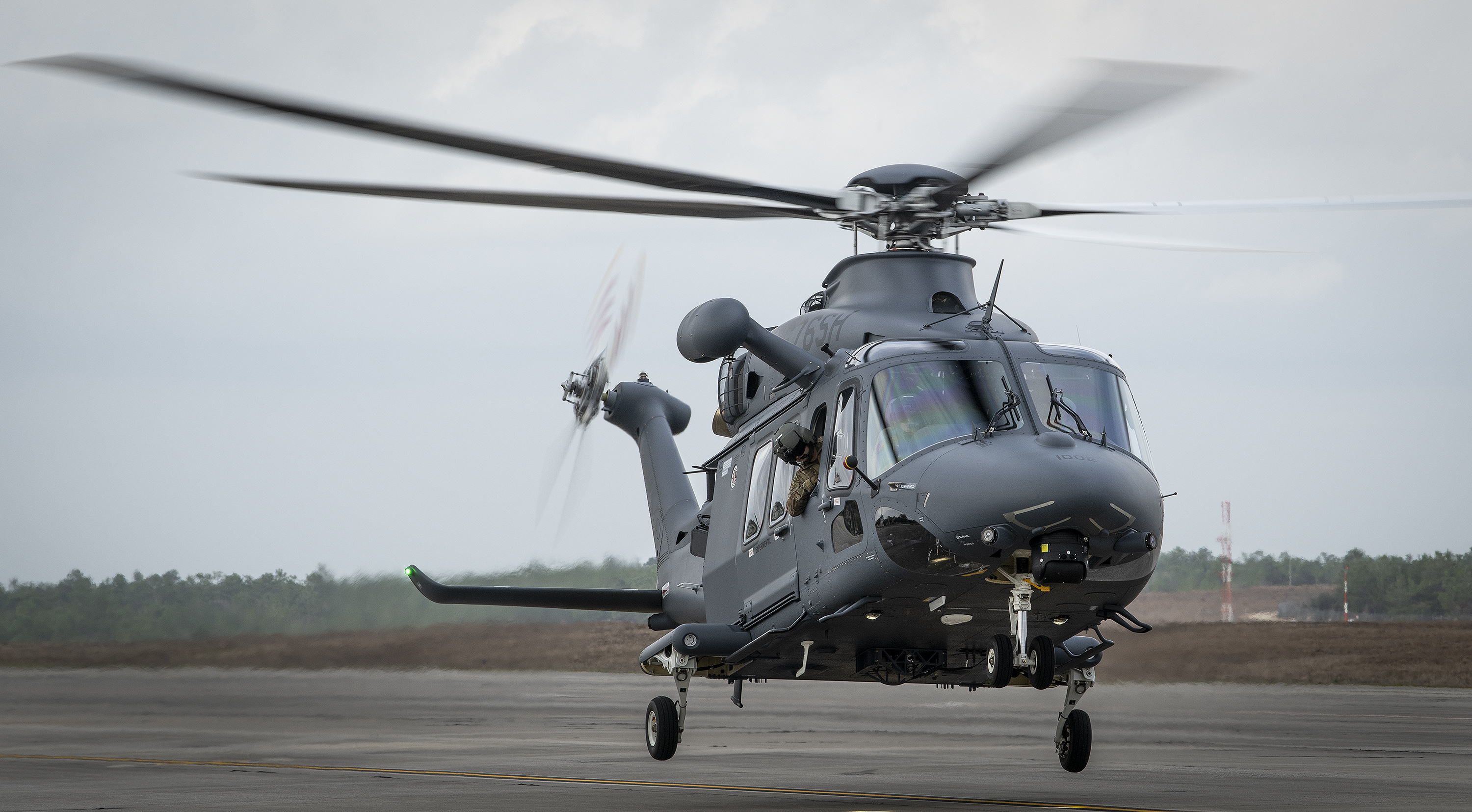
- MH-139A Grey Wolf
- Active: 1943–1945; 1948–1949; 1967–1988; 2024–present
- Country: United States
- Branch: United States Air Force
- Role: Helicopter training
- Part of: Air Force Reserve Command
- Nickname: The Magnificent Men (from 1967)
- Engagements: European Theater of Operations
- Decorations: Distinguished Unit Citation; Air Force Outstanding Unit Award; French Croix de Guerre with Palm

Commanders
- Notable commanders: Jimmy Stewart

Insignia
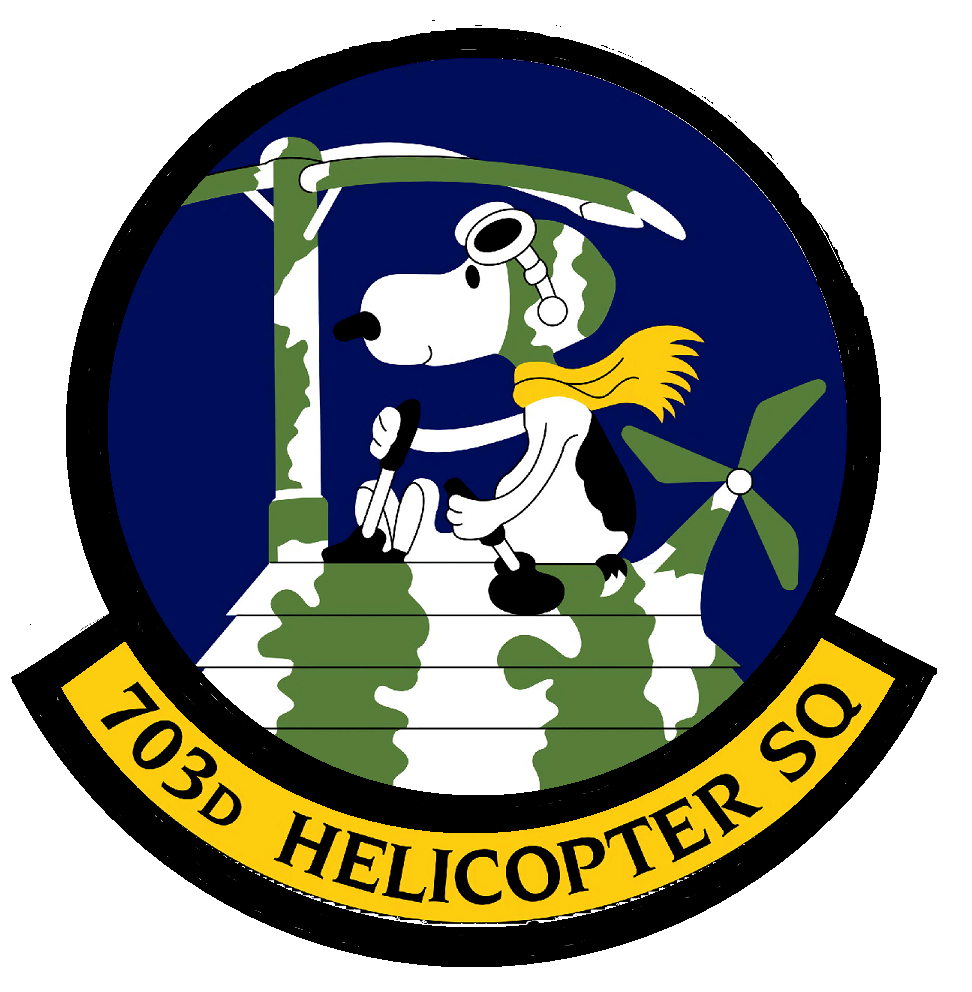
- 703d Helicopter Squadron emblem (Note: Approved 29 August 1968, based on a design by Charles M. Schulz.)

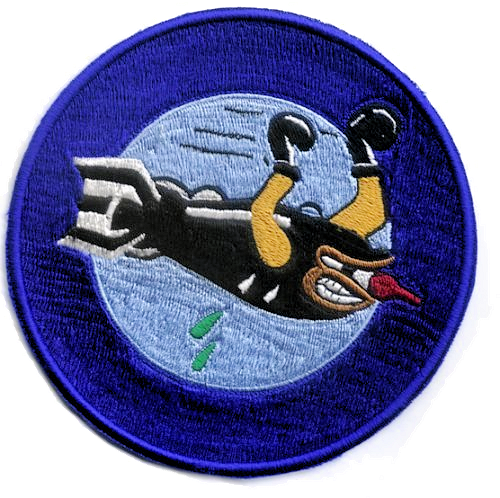
- 703d Bombardment Squadron Emblem (Note: Approved 10 Nov 1944. Description: Over and through a pastel blue disc, wide border ultramarine blue, a caricatured black aerial bomb, trimmed medium blue and white, in flight, having face, expressing ferocity, trimmed yellow, with red violet spinner for nose, and yellow arms with black boxing gloves thereon.)
- Eighth Air Force Fuselage Code: RN

The 703d Helicopter Squadron is a United States Air Force unit, assigned to the 908th Flying Training Wing at Maxwell Air Force Base, Alabama, where it was activated in July 2024 to conduct training on the MH-139 Grey Wolf helicopter.

The first predecessor of the squadron was activated during World War II as the 703d Bombardment Squadron in 1943. It trained with Consolidated B-24 Liberator bombers in the western United States before deploying to England. There it engaged in air combat for eighteen months in the European Theater of Operations, earning the Distinguished Unit Citation and the French Croix de Guerre with Palm for its actions during the war.

Although inactivated at the end of the war, the squadron was activated in the reserves in 1948. It apparently was not fully manned or equipped before it was inactivated when Continental Air Command reorganized its reserve units under the Wing Base organizational plan.

The squadron's second predecessor, 703d Tactical Air Support Squadron, was activated as a forward air control (FAC) unit in Texas in 1967. It became a special operations unit for two years before returning to its FAC mission, this time equipped with helicopters. In 1985 USAF consolidated the two squadrons into a single unit. The consolidated squadron was inactivated in June 1988.

== Mission ==
The 703d Helicopter Squadron is the Boeing MH-139A Grey Wolf Formal Training Unit for the United States Air Force.

== History ==
=== World War II ===
The 703d Bombardment Squadron was activated 1 April 1943 at Gowen Field in Idaho, where initial organization took place while key personnel traveled to Orlando AAB, Florida for training with the Army Air Forces School of Applied Tactics. Both elements met at Wendover Army Air Field, Utah on 8 June 1943, where initial training with the Consolidated B-24 Liberator took place. The squadron moved to Sioux City Army Air Base, Iowa in July 1943 to complete training. At Sioux City, Iowa, actor Jimmy Stewart was assigned as the squadron's operations officer. Capt. Stewart then became the squadron commander. In September the squadron began to receive B-24H aircraft, the model of the Liberator they would fly in combat.

On 20 October 1943 the ground echelon moved to Camp Shanks, New York and embarked on the RMS Queen Mary on 26 October 1943, sailing next day. The unit arrived in the Firth of Clyde, Scotland on 2 November 1943 and disembarked at Gourock. The air echelon departed Sioux City late in October 1943 and flew to the United Kingdom via the southern route: Florida, Puerto Rico, Brazil, and West Africa. Upon arrival, the squadron was stationed at RAF Tibenham as part of the 2nd Combat Bombardment Wing.

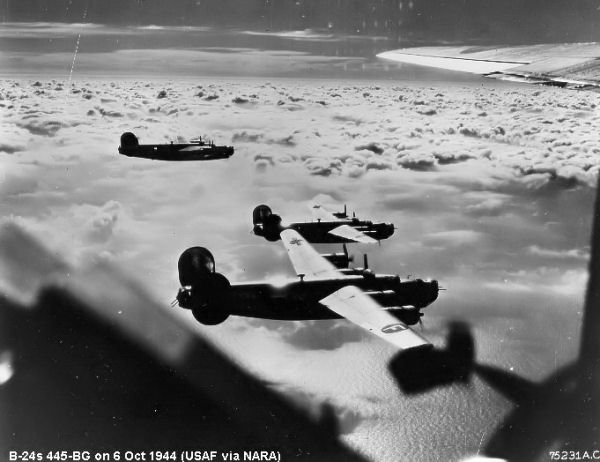
B-24 Liberators of the 445th Bomb Group on a mission over enemy-occupied territory

The 703d entered combat on 13 December 1943 by attacking U-boat installations at Kiel. The unit operated primarily as a strategic bombardment organization until the war ended, striking such targets as industries in Osnabrück, synthetic oil plants in Lutzendorf, chemical works in Ludwigshafen, marshalling yards at Hamm, an airfield at Munich, an ammunition plant at Duneberg, underground oil storage facilities at Ehmen, and factories at Münster.

The squadron participated in the Allied campaign against the German aircraft industry during Big Week, from 20 to 25 February 1944, being awarded a Distinguished Unit Citation for attacking a Messerschmitt Bf 110 aircraft assembly plant at Gotha on 24 February. This was the longest running continuous air battle of World War II – some two and a half hours of fighter attacks and flak en route and leaving the target area. Bomb damage assessment photographs showed that the plant was knocked out of production indefinitely.

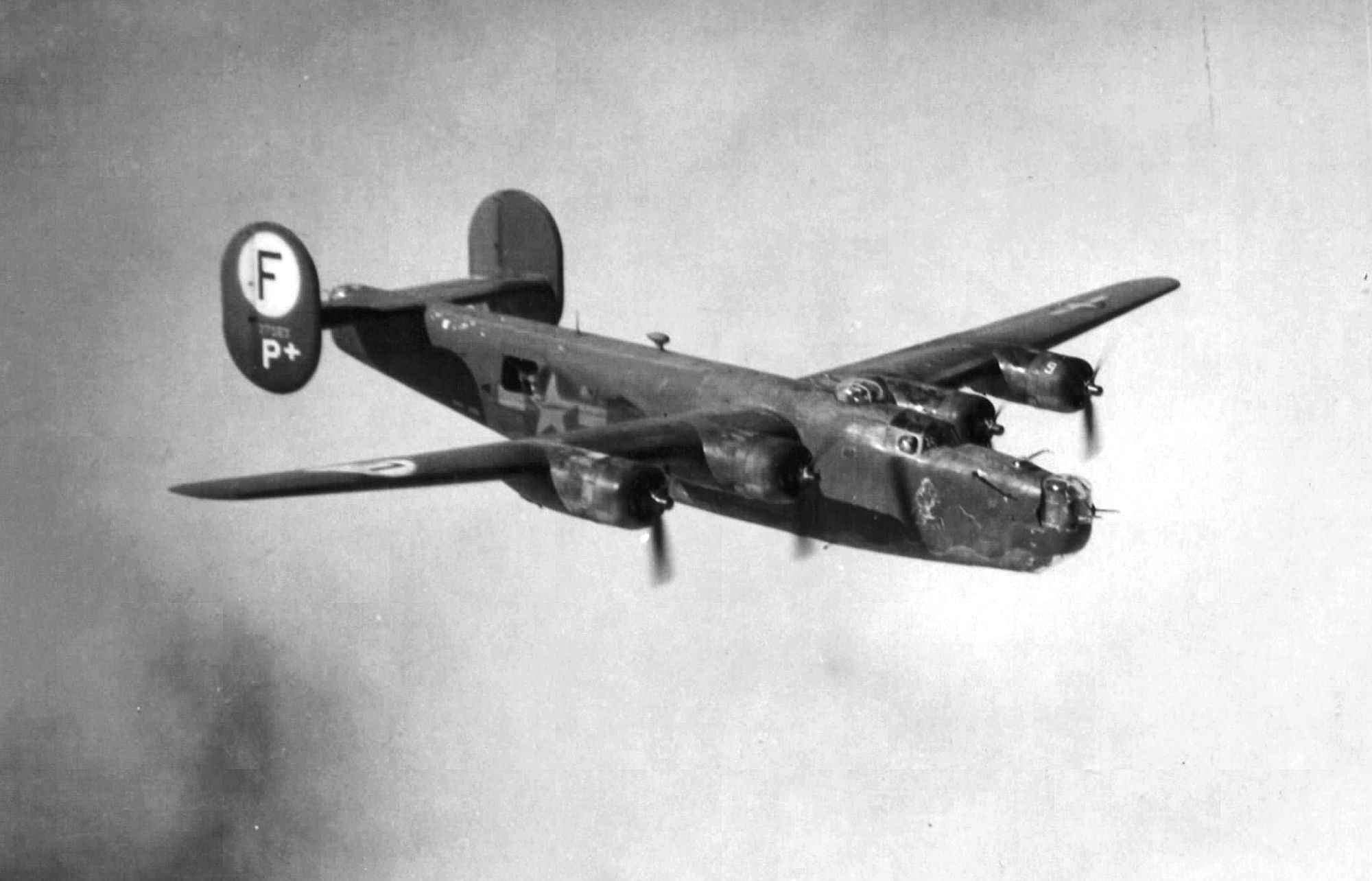
445th Bombardment Group B-24H Liberator showing the group Circle F tail marking (Note: Aircraft is Ford Motors built Consolidated B-24H-1-FO Liberator, serial 42-7563, Hell's Warrior. This plane was later transferred to the 492d Bombardment Group for special operations missions. It was lost over Yugoslavia on 9 February 1945. Baugher, Joe (26 April 2023). "1942 USAF Serial Numbers". Joe Baugher.)

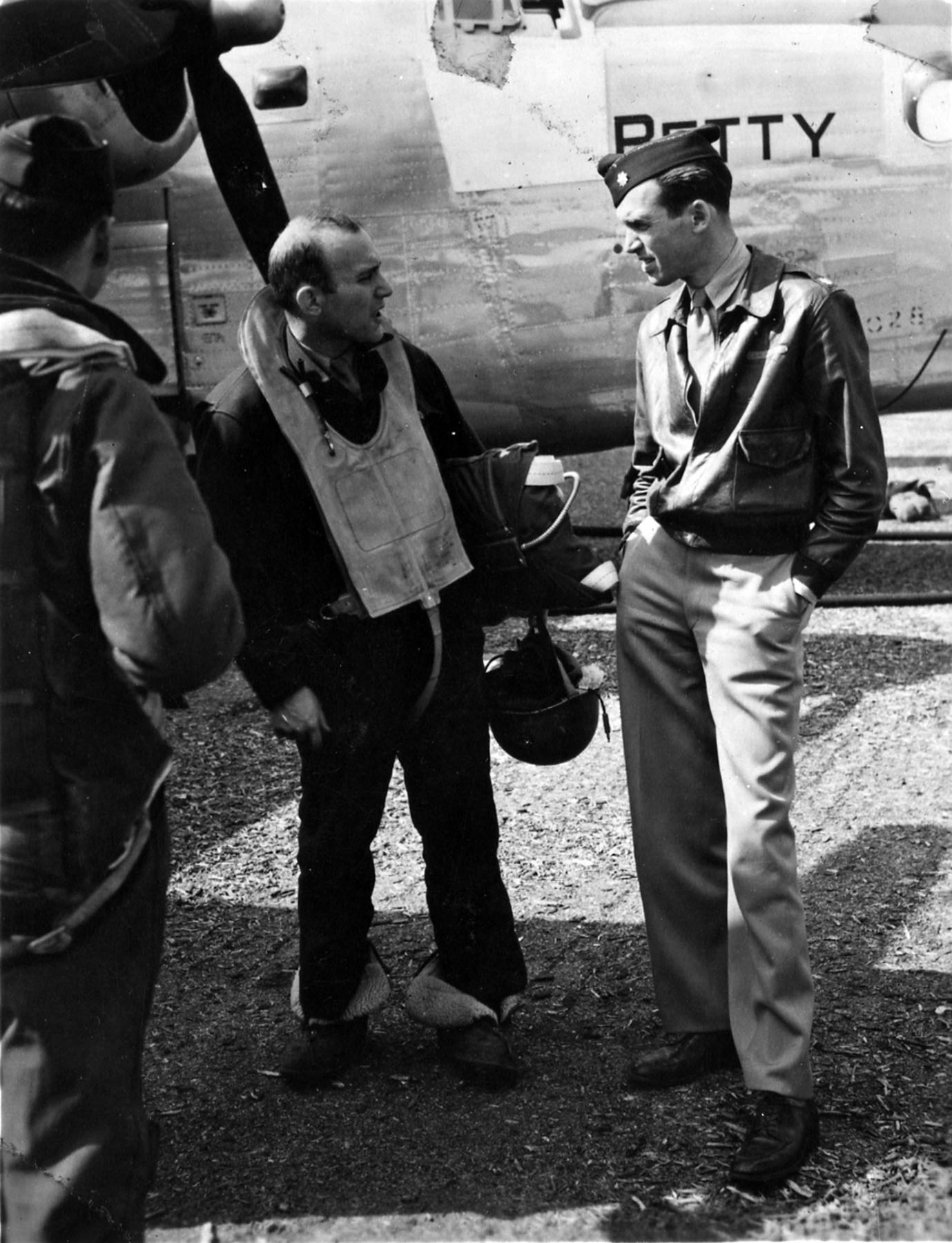
Major Jimmy Stewart, arguably the most recognizable face of the squadron

The unit occasionally flew air interdiction and air support missions. It helped to prepare for the invasion of Normandy by bombing airfields, V-1 and V-2 launch sites, and other targets. It attacked shore installations on D-Day, 6 June 1944. and supported ground forces at Saint-Lô by striking enemy defenses in July 1944. During the Battle of the Bulge, between December 1944 and January 1945 it bombed German communications. Early on 24 March 1945 the 703d dropped food, medical supplies, and ammunition to troops that landed near Wesel during Operation Varsity, the airborne assault across the Rhine, and that afternoon flew a bombing mission to the same area, hitting a landing ground at Stormede.

On occasion the unit dropped propaganda leaflets and hauled fuel to France. It was awarded the Croix de Guerre with Palm by the French government for operations in the theater from December 1943 to February 1945 supplying the resistance.

Probably, the 703d's most tragic mission is the attack on Kassel of 27 September 1944. In cloud, the navigator of the lead bomber of the 445th Bombardment Group miscalculated and the 35 planes of the 703d and the other squadrons of the group left the bomber stream of the 2d Air Division and proceeded to Göttingen some 35 miles (56 km) from the primary target. After the bomb run, the group was alone in the skies and was attacked from the rear by an estimated 150 Luftwaffe planes, resulting in the most concentrated air battle in history. The Luftwaffe unit was a Sturmgruppe, a special unit intended to attack bombers by flying in tight formations of up to ten fighters in line abreast. This was intended to break the bomber formation at a single pass. The 361st Fighter Group intervened, preventing complete destruction of the group. Twenty-nine German and 25 American planes went down in a 15-mile (24 km) radius. Only four of the 445th group's planes made it back to the base – two crashing in France, one in Belgium, another at RAF Old Buckenham. Two landed at RAF Manston. Only one of the 35 attacking aircraft was fit to fly next day.

After the end of the air war in Europe, the 703d flew low level "Trolley" missions over Germany carrying ground personnel so they could see the result of their efforts during the war. The group's air echelon departed Tibenham on 17 May 1945, and departed the United Kingdom on 20 May 1945. The 700th ground echelon sailed on the USAT Cristobal from Bristol. The ship arrived at New York on 8 June 1945. Personnel were given 30 days R&R. The squadron reestablished at Fort Dix, New Jersey, with the exception of the air echelon, which had flown to Sioux Falls Army Air Field, South Dakota. Most personnel were discharged or transferred to other units, and only a handful were left when the unit was inactivated on 12 September 1945.

=== Air Force reserve ===
The 703d Bombardment Squadron was activated again under Air Defense Command (ADC) in the reserves during the summer of 1947 at McChord Field, Washington, where it trained under the supervision of the 406th AAF Base Unit. The squadron was reassigned to the 452d Bombardment Group in May in preparation for its July move to Fresno Air Terminal, California. It was nominally a Boeing B-29 Superfortress very heavy bombardment squadron, although it is not certain that it was equipped or fully manned. In July 1948, Continental Air Command (ConAC) assumed reserve training responsibility from ADC. After conducting training for two years, the squadron was inactivated in June 1949 when ConAC reorganized its combat units under the wing base organizational model and reserve flying operations at Fresno ended.

=== Tactical air support ===
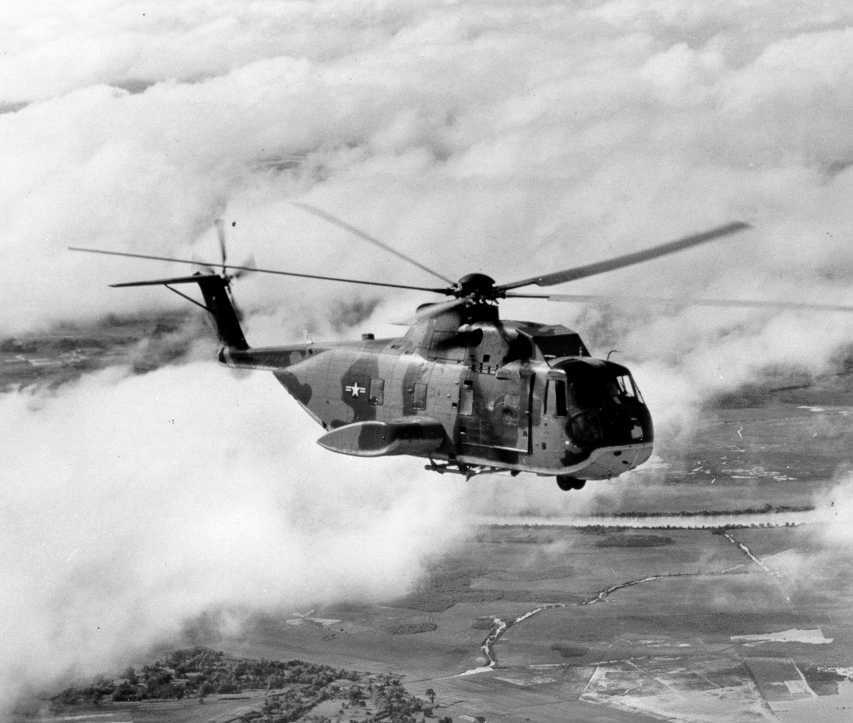
caption=Sikorsky CH-3 in flight

The 703d Tactical Air Support Squadron was activated as a forward air control (FAC) unit in Texas in 1967, equipped with helicopters. It became a special operations unit for two years before returning to its FAC mission. It flew the Sikorsky CH-3E and tested the Sikorsky UH-60A Blackhawk helicopter for use as a possible replacement. The squadron participated in numerous exercises. Elements of the squadron deployed to Saudi Arabia in 1980 where they participated in the rescue of a downed McDonnell Douglas RF-4C Phantom II crew. In 1985 the two squadrons were consolidated into a single unit. The squadron was inactivated in 1988.

=== Helicopter training ===
The squadron was again activated in the Air Force Reserve at Maxwell Air Force Base, Alabama on 20 July 2024 as the 703d Helicopter Squadron. The squadron drew its initial cadre from the 357th Airlift Squadron, which was inactivated the same day, and received training on the MH-139 from the 512th Rescue Squadron. It conducts formal training on the Boeing MH-139 Grey Wolf for the Air Force, including regular, reserve, and air guard aircrew.

== Lineage ==
703d Bombardment Squadron

- Constituted as the 703d Bombardment Squadron (Heavy) on 20 March 1943

Activated on 1 April 1943
Redesignated 703d Bombardment Squadron, Heavy on 20 August 1943
Inactivated on 12 September 1945

- Redesignated 703d Bombardment Squadron, Very Heavy on 13 May 1947 and allotted to the reserve

Activated on 1 January 1948
Inactivated on 27 June 1949
Consolidated with the 703d Tactical Air Support Squadron as 703d Tactical Air Support Squadron on 19 September 1985

703d Helicopter Squadron

- Constituted as the 703d Tactical Air Support Squadron c. 13 February 1967

Activated on 3 April 1967
Redesignated 703d Special Operations Squadron
Redesignated 703d Tactical Air Support Squadron (Helicopter) on 1 November 1971
Consolidated with the 703d Bombardment Squadron on 19 September 1985
Inactivated on 1 June 1988

- Redesignated 703d Helicopter Squadron on 20 June 2024

Activated on 20 July 2024

=== Assignments ===
- 445th Bombardment Group, 1 April 1943 – 12 September 1945
- 445th Bombardment Group, 1 January 1948
- 452d Bombardment Group, 28 May 1948 – 27 June 1949
- 507th Tactical Control Group, 3 April 1967
- 4471st Tactical Air Support Group, 1 July 1969
- 68th Tactical Air Support Group, 15 January 1970
- 507th Tactical Air Control Group (later 507th Tactical Air Control Wing), 1 June 1974 – 1 June 1988
- 908th Operations Group, 20 July 2024 – present

=== Stations ===
- Gowen Field, Idaho, 1 April 1943
- Wendover Field, Utah, 8 June 1943
- Sioux City Army Air Base, Iowa, 8 July 1943 – 20 October 1943
- RAF Tibenham, England (Station 124), 2 November 1943 – 30 May 1945
- Fort Dix Army Air Base, New Jersey, c. 9 June 145 – 12 September 1945
- McChord Air Force Base, Washington, 1 January 1948
- Fresno Air Terminal, California, 6 July 1948 – 27 June 1949
- Bergstrom Air Force Base, Texas, 3 April 1967 – 1 June 1988
- Maxwell Air Force Base, Alabama, 20 July 2024 – present

=== Aircraft ===
- Consolidated B-24 Liberator, 1943–1945
- Sikorsky CH-3, 1967–1988

=== Awards and campaigns ===
| Award streamer | Award | Dates | Notes |
|---|---|---|---|
| | Distinguished Unit Citation | 24 February 1944 | Gotha, Germany 703d Bombardment Squadron |
| | Air Force Outstanding Unit Award | 10 February 1972-14 February 1972 | 703d Tactical Air Support Squadron |
| | Air Force Outstanding Unit Award | 16 June 1975-31 May 1976 | 703d Tactical Air Support Squadron |
| | Air Force Outstanding Unit Award | 1 May 1981-30 April 1983 | 703d Tactical Air Support Squadron |
| | Air Force Outstanding Unit Award | 1 May 1983-30 April 1985 | 703d Tactical Air Support Squadron |
| | Air Force Outstanding Unit Award | 1 May 1985-30 April 1987 | 703d Tactical Air Support Squadron |
| | French Croix de Guerre with Palm | December 1943-February 1945 | 703d Bombardment Squadron |

| Campaign Streamer | Campaign | Dates | Notes |
|---|---|---|---|
| | Air Offensive, Europe | 2 November 1943 – 5 June 1944 | 703d Bombardment Squadron |
| | Air Combat, EAME Theater | 2 November 1943 – 11 May 1945 | 703d Bombardment Squadron |
| | Normandy | 6 June 1944 – 24 July 1944 | 703d Bombardment Squadron |
| | Northern France | 25 July 1944 – 14 September 1944 | 703d Bombardment Squadron |
| | Rhineland | 15 September 1944 – 21 March 1945 | 703d Bombardment Squadron |
| | Ardennes-Alsace | 16 December 1944 – 25 January 1945 | 703d Bombardment Squadron |
| | Central Europe | 22 March 1944 – 21 May 1945 | 703d Bombardment Squadron |

== See also ==
- B-24 Liberator units of the United States Army Air Forces
- List of United States Air Force helicopter squadrons
