= 701st Airlift Squadron =

701st Airlift Squadron

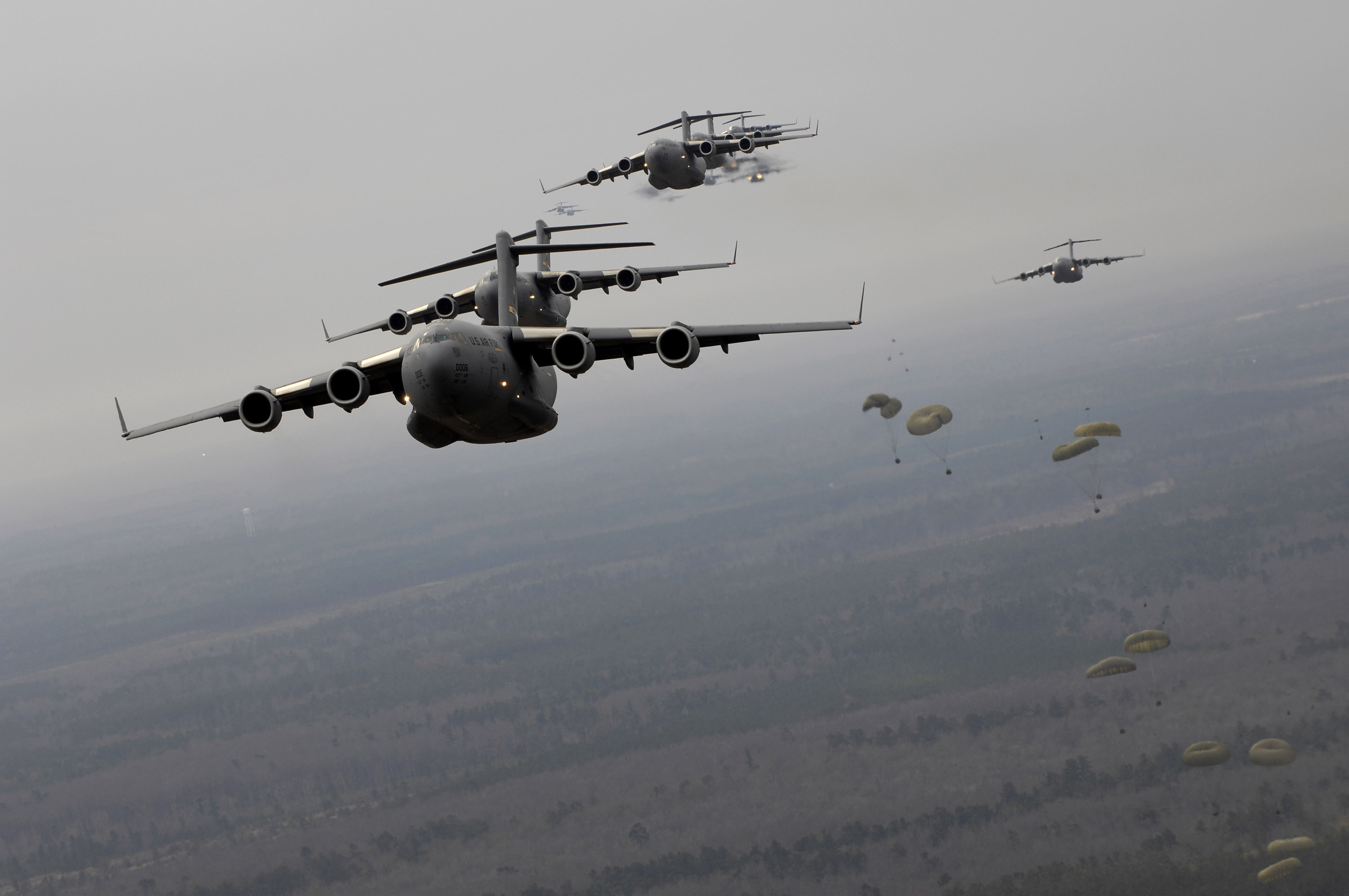
- C-17 Globemaster IIIs assigned to the 437th and 315th Airlift Wings participate in an exercise over the coast of Charleston, SC.
- Active: 1943–1945; 1947–1949; 1952–1957; 1957–1965; 1970–present
- Country: United States
- Branch: United States Air Force
- Role: Airlift
- Part of: Air Force Reserve Command
- Garrison/HQ: Charleston Air Force Base
- Engagements: European Theater of Operations; Operation Just Cause
- Decorations: Distinguished Unit Citation; Air Force Outstanding Unit Award; French Croix de Guerre with Palm; Republic of Vietnam Gallantry Cross with Palm

Insignia
- 701st Airlift Squadron Emblem (Note: Approved 20 February 1961. Description: On a white scroll [sic] bordered red, a green turtle, eyeball white, pupil Air Force blue, his red shell trimmed Air Force golden yellow and equipped with Air Force golden yellow airplane wings; tied on the turtle's black with Air Force golden yellow rope, a stack of light blue boxes shaded Air Force blue; on the turtle's head a pair of Air Force blue headphones, details light blue; outlines and details Air Force blue throughout.)

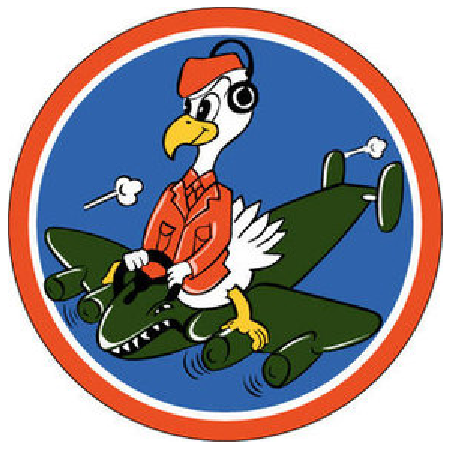
- 701st Bombardment Squadron emblem (World War II)
- World War II Fuselage Code: MK

The 701st Airlift Squadron is part of the 315th Airlift Wing at Charleston Air Force Base, South Carolina. It operates Boeing C-17 Globemaster III aircraft providing global airlift.

The squadron was first activated in April 1943 as the 701st Bombardment Squadron. After training in the United States, it deployed with its Consolidated B-24 Liberators to the European Theater of Operations, where it participated in the strategic bombing campaign until the end of hostilities, earning a Distinguished Unit Citation and a French Croix de Guerre with Palm for its actions. It returned to the United States in the summer of 1945 and was inactivated in September.

The squadron was reactivated in the reserves in 1947, although it is not clear whether it was fully manned or equipped before inactivating in 1949. It was activated again in the reserves in 1952 as the 701st Fighter-Bomber Squadron. It was inactivated in July 1957, but activated a few months later in the airlift role as the 701st Troop Carrier Squadron. The squadron was called to active duty during the Cuban Missile Crisis. Except for an inactive period from 1965 through 1970, the squadron has served as a reserve airlift unit.

== Mission ==
To provide trained personnel to be a source of augmentation for the active forces in any emergency expansion of the Air Force strategic and aeromedical airlift capability.

== History ==
=== World War II ===
==== Organization and training in the United States ====
The 701st Bombardment Squadron was activated 1 April 1943 at Gowen Field in Idaho, where initial organization took place while key personnel traveled to Orlando Army Air Base, Florida for training with the Army Air Forces School of Applied Tactics. Both elements met at Wendover Army Air Field, Utah on 8 June 1943, where initial training with the Consolidated B-24 Liberator took place. The squadron moved to Sioux City Army Air Base, Iowa in July 1943 to complete training. In September the squadron began to receive B-24H aircraft, the model of the Liberator they would fly in combat.

On 20 October 1943 the ground echelon moved to Camp Shanks, New York and embarked on the RMS Queen Mary on 26 October 1943, sailing next day. The unit arrived in the Firth of Clyde, Scotland on 2 November 1943 and disembarked at Gourock. The air echelon departed Sioux City late in October 1943 and flew to the United Kingdom via the southern route: Florida, Puerto Rico, Brazil, and West Africa. Upon arrival, the squadron was stationed at RAF Tibenham as part of the 2nd Combat Bombardment Wing. The group was initially given a fuselage code of MK.

==== Combat in Europe ====
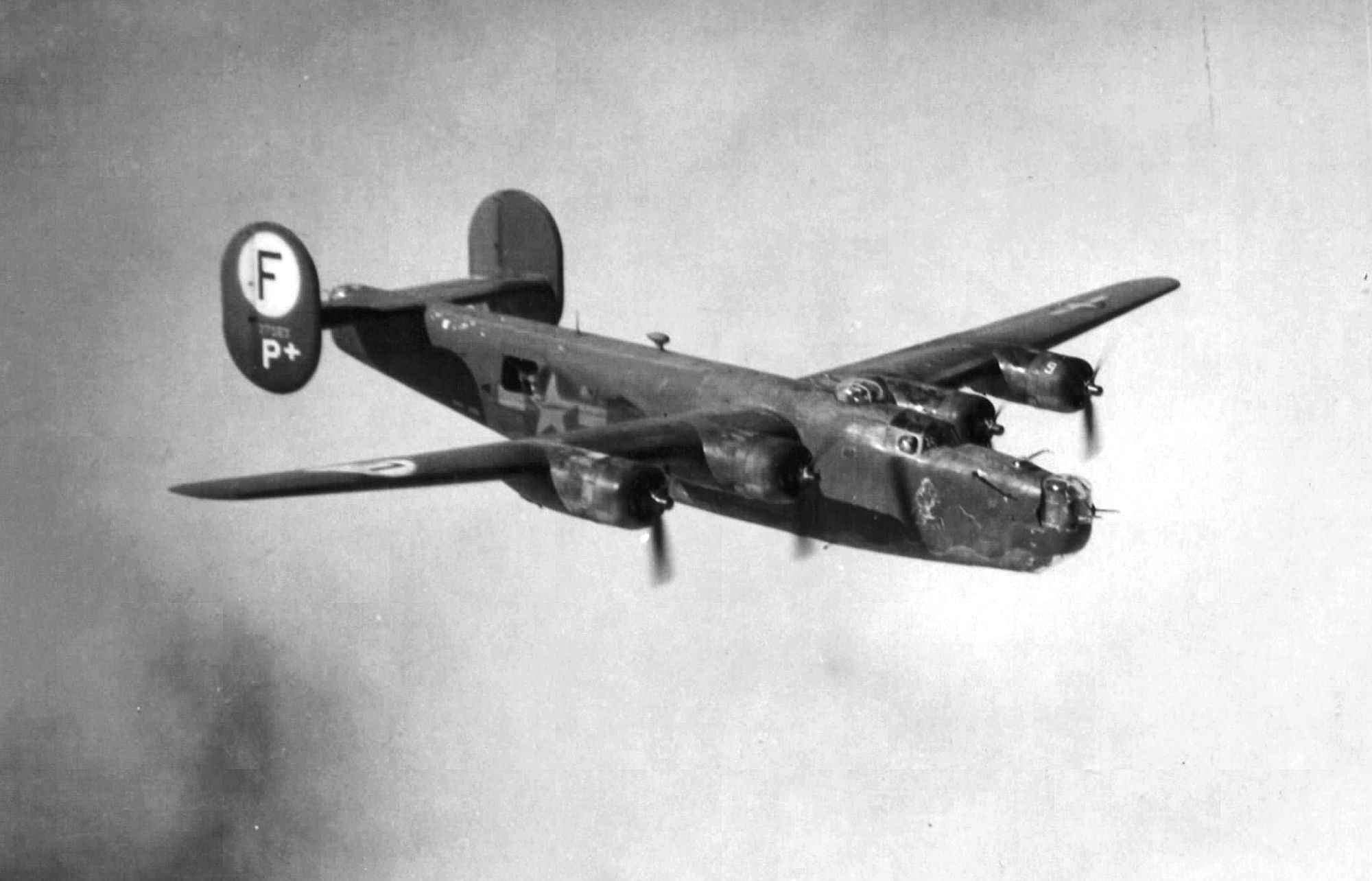
B-24H Liberator 42-7563, "Hell's Warrior" of the 701st BS. Aircraft was lost on 9 February 1944

The 701st entered combat on 13 December 1943 by attacking U-boat installations at Kiel. The unit operated primarily as a strategic bombardment organization until the war ended, striking such targets as industries in Osnabrück, synthetic oil plants in Lutzendorf, chemical works in Ludwigshafen, marshalling yards at Hamm, an airfield at Munich, an ammunition plant at Duneberg, underground oil storage facilities at Ehmen, and factories at Münster.

The squadron participated in the Allied campaign against the German aircraft industry during Big Week, from 20 to 25 February 1944, being awarded a Distinguished Unit Citation for attacking a Bf 110 aircraft assembly plant at Gotha on 24 February. This was the longest running continuous air battle of World War II—some two and a half hours of fighter attacks and flak en route and leaving the target area. Bomb damage assessment photographs showed that the plant was knocked out of production indefinitely.

The unit occasionally flew air interdiction and air support missions. It helped to prepare for the invasion of Normandy by bombing airfields, V-1 and V-2 launch sites, and other targets. It attacked shore installations on D-Day, 6 June 1944. and supported ground forces at Saint-Lô by striking enemy defenses in July 1944. During the Battle of the Bulge, between December 1944 and January 1945 it bombed German communications. Early on 24 March 1945 the 701st dropped food, medical supplies, and ammunition to troops that landed near Wesel during the airborne assault across the Rhine and that afternoon flew a bombing mission to the same area, hitting a landing ground at Stormede.

On occasion the unit dropped propaganda leaflets and hauled fuel to France. It was awarded the Croix de guerre with Palm by the French government for operations in the theater from December 1943 to February 1945 supplying the resistance.

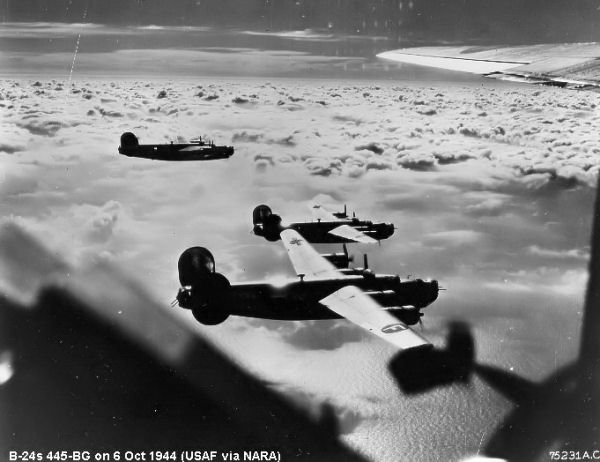
B-24 Liberators of the 445th Bomb Group on a mission over enemy-occupied territory

The 701st's most tragic mission is the attack on Kassel of 27 September 1944. In cloud, the navigator of the lead bomber of the 445th Bombardment Group miscalculated and the 35 planes of the 701st and the other squadrons of the group left the bomber stream of the 2d Air Division and proceeded to Göttingen some 35 miles (56 km) from the primary target. After the bomb run, the group was alone in the skies and was attacked from the rear by an estimated 150 Luftwaffe planes, resulting in the most concentrated air battle in history. The Luftwaffe unit was a Sturmgruppe, a special unit intended to attack bombers by flying in tight formations of up to ten fighters in line abreast. This was intended to break the bomber formation at a single pass. The 361st Fighter Group intervened, preventing complete destruction of the group. Twenty-nine German and 25 American planes went down in a 15-mile (24 km) radius. Only four of the 445th group's planes made it back to the base—two crashing in France, one in Belgium, another at RAF Old Buckenham. Two landed at RAF Manston. Only one of the 35 attacking aircraft was fit to fly next day.

After the end of the air war in Europe, the 701st flew low level "Trolley" missions over Germany carrying ground personnel so they could see the result of their efforts during the war. The group's air echelon departed Tibenham on 17 May 1945, and departed the United Kingdom on 20 May 1945. The 700th ground echelon sailed on the USAT Cristobal from Bristol. The ship arrived at New York on 8 June 1945. Personnel were given 30 days R&R. The squadron reestablished at Fort Dix, New Jersey, with the exception of the air echelon, which had flown to Sioux Falls Army Air Field, South Dakota. Most personnel were discharged or transferred to other units, and only a handful were left when the unit was inactivated on 12 September 1945.

=== Air Force reserve ===
==== Bombardment unit ====
The 701st Bombardment Squadron was activated again under Air Defense Command (ADC) in the reserves during the summer of 1947 at McChord Field, Washington, where it trained under the supervision of the 406th AAF Base Unit. The squadron was nominally a Boeing B-29 Superfortress very heavy bombardment squadron, although it is not certain that it was equipped or fully manned. In 1948, Continental Air Command (ConAC) assumed reserve training responsibility from ADC and the 406th Base Unit became the 2345th AF Reserve Training Center. After conducting training for two years, the squadron was inactivated in June 1949 when ConAC reorganized its combat units under the wing base organizational model. It was replaced at McChord by elements of the 302d Troop Carrier Wing.

==== Fighter operations ====
The squadron was activated again in the reserves in 1952 at Buffalo Municipal Airport, New York as the 701st Fighter-Bomber Squadron. Although designated as a fighter unit, until 1955 the squadron primarily flew North American T-6 Texan trainer aircraft, although it was equipped with a few North American F-51 Mustangs and Lockheed F-80 Shooting Stars. In 1955 the 701st moved a few miles to Niagara Falls Municipal Airport as a Republic F-84 Thunderjet unit. Despite its fighter-bomber designation, the squadron was gained by ADC upon mobilization. ADC required the squadron be designed to augment active duty squadrons capable of performing air defense missions for an indefinite period after mobilization independently of its parent wing. In 1957, budget cuts led to a reduction in the number of reserve squadrons from 55 to 45. In addition, within the Air Staff was a recommendation that the reserve fighter mission be given to the Air National Guard and replaced by the troop carrier mission. As a result, the Air Force reduced its operations at Niagara Falls, eliminating the fighter mission, and the 701st was inactivated in July.

==== Troop carrier operations ====
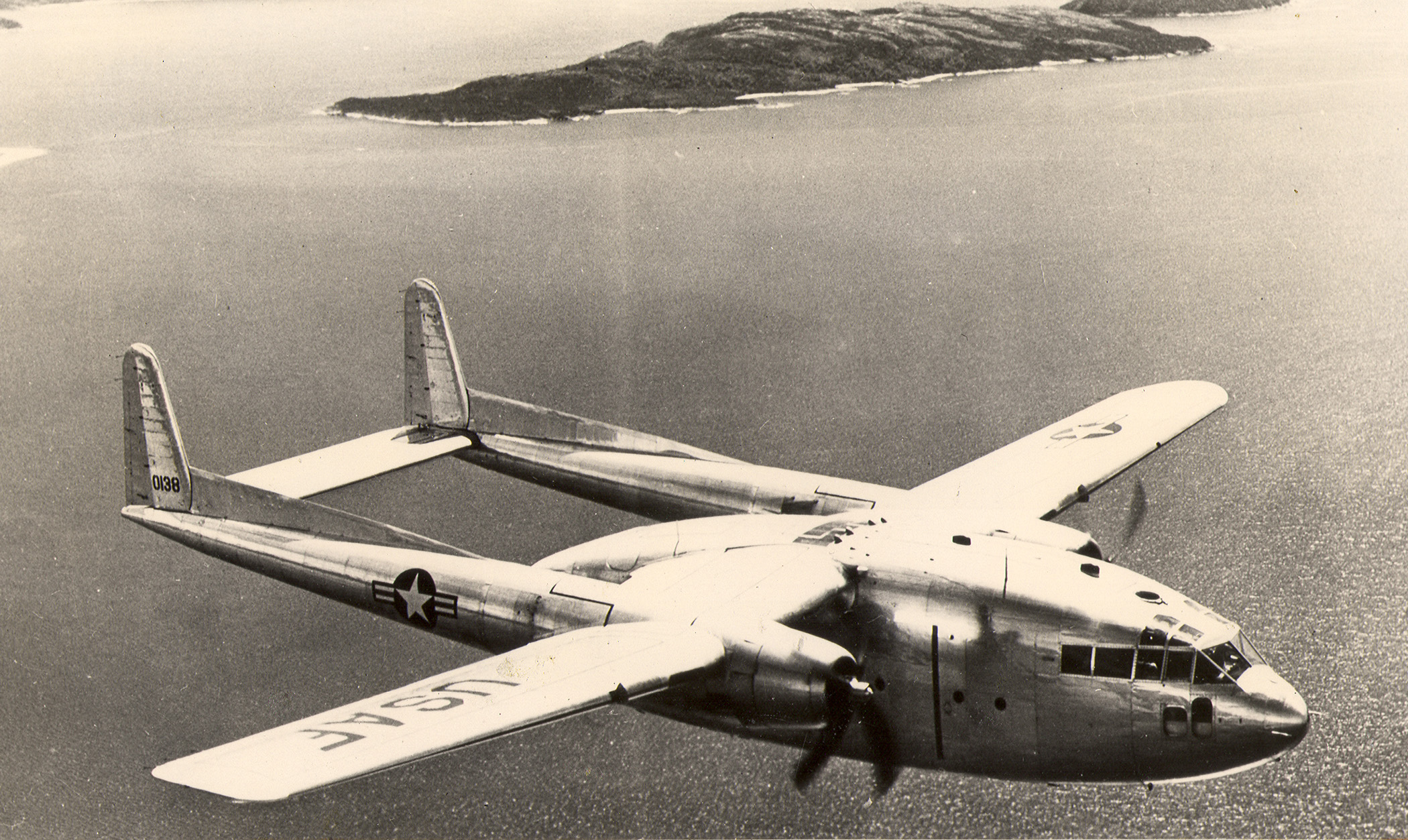
Fairchild C-119 of the Air Force Reserve

As the conversion of the reserves to a tactical airlift force continued, the squadron became the 701st Troop Carrier Squadron at Memphis Municipal Airport on 16 November 1957, when the 445th Troop Carrier Group assumed the resources of the 319th Fighter-Bomber Wing as it converted to the Fairchild C-119 Flying Boxcar. In 1958, ConAC reorganized its wings under the dual deputy system and the 445th Group was inactivated and the squadron transferred directly to the 445th Troop Carrier Wing, although wing headquarters were located at Dobbins Air Force Base, Georgia. The separation of squadrons from their parent wings, under what was called the Detached Squadron Concept, had evolved in the spring of 1955, when ConAC decided that moving squadrons to separate sites offered several advantages: communities were more likely to accept the smaller squadrons than the large wings and the location of separate squadrons in smaller population centers would facilitate recruiting and manning. However, under this concept, support organizations remained with the wing. The following year, the squadron converted from the Flying Boxcar to the Fairchild C-123 Provider.

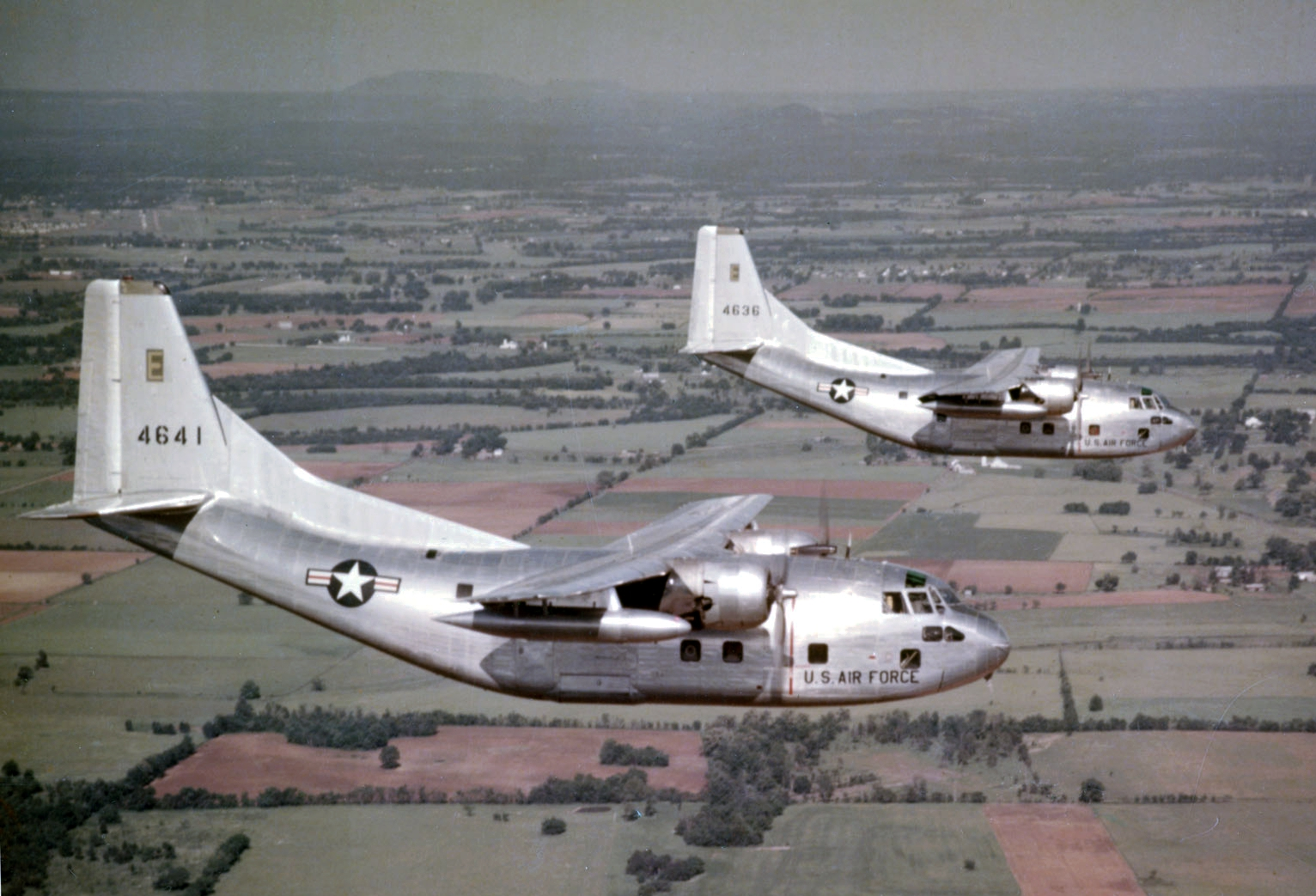
C-123Bs in flight

Although the dispersal of flying units under the Detached Squadron Concept was not a problem when the entire wing was called to active service, mobilizing a single flying squadron and elements to support it proved difficult. This weakness was demonstrated in the partial mobilization of reserve units during the Berlin Crisis of 1961. To resolve this, ConAC determined to reorganize its reserve wings by establishing groups with support elements for each of its troop carrier squadrons at the start of 1962. This reorganization would facilitate mobilization of elements of wings in various combinations when needed. However, as the plan to form support units at dispersed locations was entering its implementation phase, another partial mobilization, which included the 701st, occurred for the Cuban Missile Crisis, with the units being released on 22 November 1962. The formation of troop carrier groups was delayed until February for wings that had been mobilized. In February, the 919th Troop Carrier Group, which included the 701st and support organizations, was activated at Memphis. In 1965, reserve operations at Memphis were terminated and the 701st was inactivated.

==== Reserve associate ====
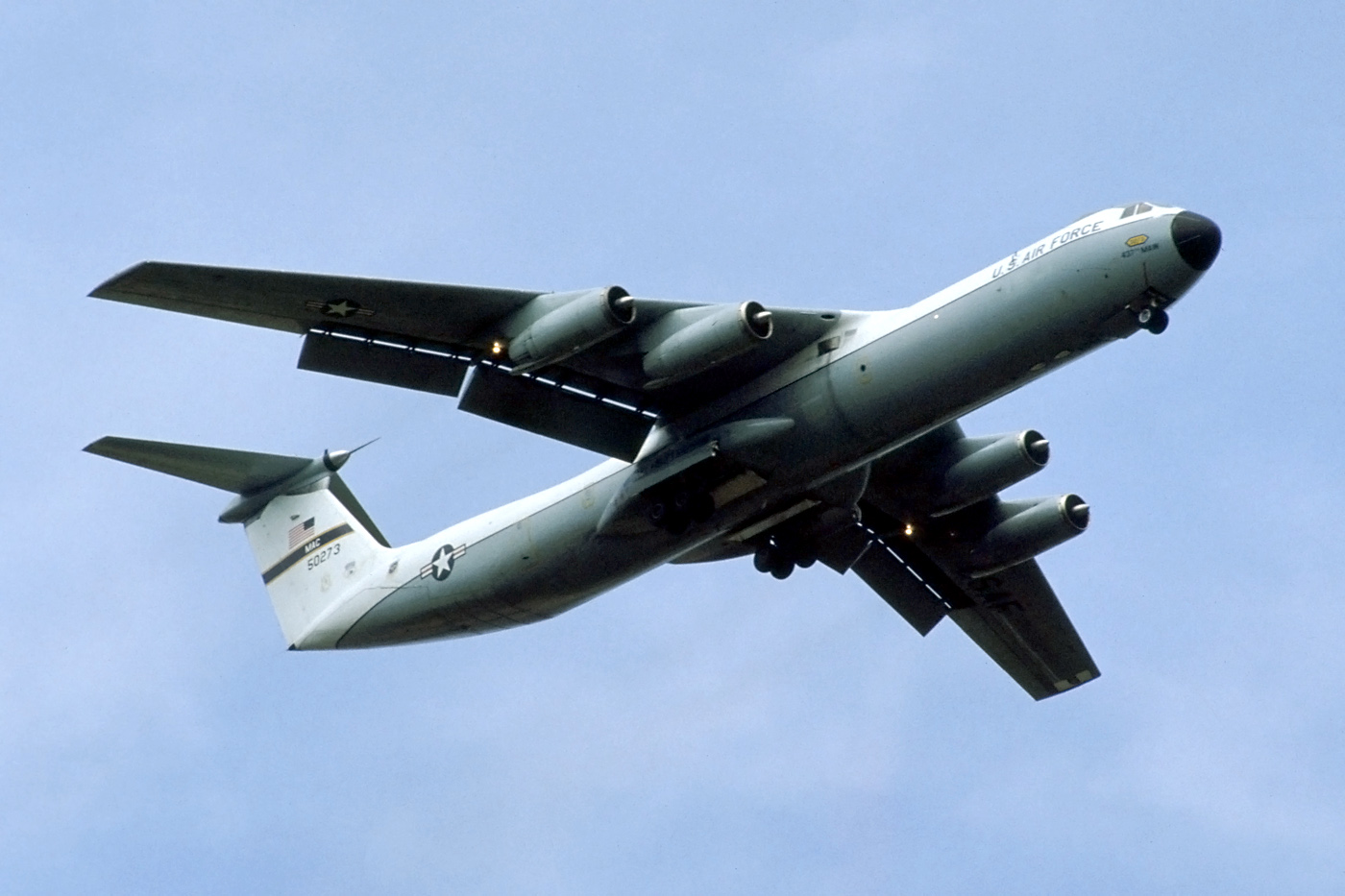
C-141B of the 315th and 437th Wings

By 1968 regular air force military airlift squadrons were operating the Lockheed C-141 Starlifter, while the reserves still flew the obsolete Douglas C-124 Globemaster II. As the Globemaster was retired, Air Force Reserve formed associate units, initially with the C-141. In this program reserve units flew and maintained aircraft owned by an associated regular unit. In September 1970, the squadron was redesignated the 701st Military Airlift Squadron and activated at Charleston Air Force Base, South Carolina, where it was assigned to the 943d Military Airlift Group as an associate of the 437th Military Airlift Wing. Two years later, the 315th Military Airlift Wing replaced the 943d Group as the reserve command for Charleston airlift units. The squadron assisted with the redeployment of U.S. Army and Marine Corps personnel from Grenada following Operation Urgent Fury in 1983. In 1984 and 1985, the squadron helped deploy U.S. personnel throughout Central and South America from Howard Air Force Base, Panama in support of Operations Volant Oak. From 1992, it has been involved in various humanitarian missions including missions to Washington, DC and New York City in aftermath of the 9/11 attacks on the US by terrorists. The squadron airlifted NASA's Mars Odyssey spacecraft from Buckley Air Force Base, Colorado to Cape Canaveral, Florida for its launch to orbit Mars on 4 January 2001. It supported relief missions for damage caused by Hurricane Katrina in August 2005 and Hurricane Ike in September 2008.

== Lineage ==
- Constituted as the 701st Bombardment Squadron (Heavy) on 20 March 1943

Activated on 1 April 1943

- Redesignated 701st Bombardment Squadron, Heavy on 20 August 1943

Inactivated on 12 September 1945

- Redesignated 701st Bombardment Squadron, Very Heavy on 13 May 1947

Activated in the reserve on 12 July 1947
Inactivated on 27 June 1949

- Redesignated 701st Fighter-Bomber Squadron on 24 June 1952

Activated on 8 July 1952
Inactivated on 1 July 1957

- Redesignated 701st Troop Carrier Squadron, Medium on 24 October 1957

Activated 16 November 1957

- Redesignated 701st Troop Carrier Squadron, Assault on 25 September 1958

Discontinued and inactivated on 15 December 1965

- Redesignated 701st Military Airlift Squadron (Associate) on 16 September 1970

Activated on 25 September 1970

- Redesignated 701st Airlift Squadron (Associate) on 1 February 1992
- Redesignated 701st Airlift Squadron on 1 October 1994

=== Assignments ===
- 445th Bombardment Group: 1 April 1943 – 12 September 1945
- 445th Bombardment Group: 12 July 1947 – 27 June 1949
- 445th Fighter-Bomber Group: 8 July 1952 – 1 July 1957
- 445th Troop Carrier Group: 16 November 1957
- 445th Troop Carrier Wing: 25 September 1958 (detached)
- 919th Troop Carrier Group: 11 February 1963 – 15 December 1965
- 943d Military Airlift Group: 25 September 1970
- 315th Military Airlift Wing (later 315th Airlift Wing): 1 July 1973
- 315th Operations Group: 1 August 1992 – present

=== Stations ===
- Gowen Field, Idaho, 1 April 1943
- Wendover Field, Utah, 8 June 1943
- Sioux City Army Air Base, Iowa, 8 July 1943 – 20 October 1943
- RAF Tibenham (Station 124), England, 2 November 1943 – 30 May 1945
- Fort Dix Army Air Base, New Jersey, 9 June 1945 – 12 September 1945
- McChord Air Force Base, Washington, 12 July 1957 – 27 June 1949
- Buffalo Municipal Airport, New York, 8 July 1952
- Niagara Falls Municipal Airport, New York, 15 June 1955
- Memphis Municipal Airport, Tennessee, 16 November 1957 – 15 December 1965
- Charleston Air Force Base, South Carolina, 25 September 1970 – present

=== Aircraft ===
- Consolidated B-24 Liberator (1943–1945)
- North American T-6 Texan (1952–1954)
- North American F-51 Mustang (1953–1954)
- Lockheed T-33 T-Bird (1954–1957)
- Lockheed F-80 Shooting Star (1954–1956)
- North American T-28 Trojan (1955–1956)
- Republic F-84 Thunderjet (1956–1957)
- Fairchild C-119 Flying Boxcar (1957–1958)
- Fairchild C-123 Provider (1958–1965)
- Douglas C-47 Skytrain (1962)
- Lockheed C-141 Starlifter (1970–1997)
- Boeing C-17 Globemaster III (1997–present)

=== Awards and campaigns ===
Award streamer	Award	Dates	Notes
	Distinguished Unit Citation	24 February 1944	Gotha, Germany 701st Bombardment Squadron
	Air Force Outstanding Unit Award	1 July 1972-30 June 1973	701st Military Airlift Squadron
	Air Force Outstanding Unit Award	11 January 1982-31 December 1983	701st Military Airlift Squadron
	Air Force Outstanding Unit Award	1 July 1988-30 June 1989	701st Military Airlift Squadron
	Air Force Outstanding Unit Award	1 July 1989-30 June 1990	701st Military Airlift Squadron
	Air Force Outstanding Unit Award	21 September-31 October 1989	701st Military Airlift Squadron
	Air Force Outstanding Unit Award	1 July 1993-30 June 1995	701st Airlift Squadron
	Air Force Outstanding Unit Award	1 July 1995-30 June 1997	701st Airlift Squadron
	Air Force Outstanding Unit Award	1 July 1998-30 June 2000	701st Airlift Squadron
	Air Force Outstanding Unit Award	1 September 1998-31 August 2000	701st Airlift Squadron
	Air Force Outstanding Unit Award	11 September 2001–10 September 2003	701st Airlift Squadron
	Air Force Outstanding Unit Award	1 August 2005–31 July 2007	701st Airlift Squadron
	French Croix de Guerre with Palm	December 1943 – February 1945	701st Bombardment Squadron
	Vietnamese Gallantry Cross with Palm	25 September 1970-28 January 1973	701st Military Airlift Squadron

Campaign Streamer	Campaign	Dates	Notes
	Air Offensive, Europe	2 November 1943 – 5 June 1944	701st Bombardment Squadron
	Air Combat, EAME Theater	2 November 1943 – 11 May 1945	701st Bombardment Squadron
	Normandy	6 June 1944 – 24 July 1944	701st Bombardment Squadron
	Northern France	25 July 1944 – 14 September 1944	701st Bombardment Squadron
	Rhineland	15 September 1944 – 21 March 1945	701st Bombardment Squadron
	Ardennes-Alsace	16 December 1944 – 25 January 1945	701st Bombardment Squadron
	Central Europe	22 March 1944 – 21 May 1945	701st Bombardment Squadron
	Just Cause	20 December 1989 – 31 January 1990	Panama 701st Military Airlift Squadron

== See also ==
- B-24 Liberator units of the United States Army Air Forces
- List of Douglas C-47 Skytrain operators
- List of United States Air Force airlift squadrons
