= RAF Tibenham =

Former RAF Station in Norfolk, England

RAF Tibenham RAF Tivetshall RFC Tibenham USAAF Station 124
- Located Near Diss, Norfolk, in England
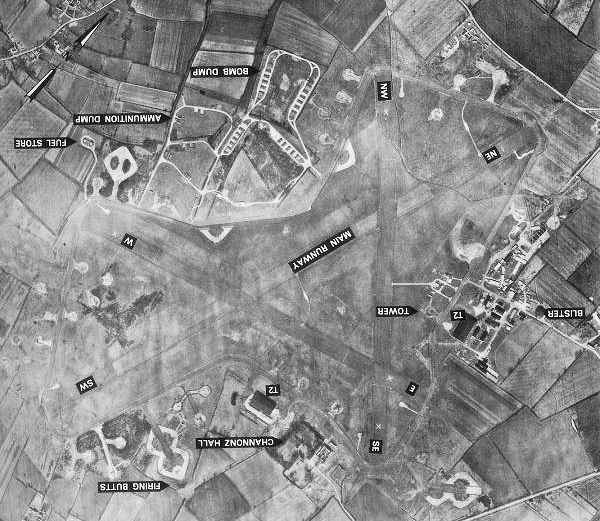
- Postwar photo of Tibenham Airfield, England

Site information
- Type: Royal Air Force station
- Owner: Air Ministry
- Operator: Royal Flying Corps; Royal Air Force; United States Army Air Forces
- Controlled by: Eighth Air Force; RAF Maintenance Command

Location
- Location in Norfolk
- Location within Norfolk
- Coordinates: 52.46°N 1.16°E

Site history
- Built: 1916 and 1941
- Built by: W. & C. French Ltd.
- In use: 1916-1920; 1942-1959
- Battles/wars: European Theatre of World War II; Air Offensive, Europe July 1942 - May 1945

Garrison information
- Garrison: 445th Bombardment Group

Airfield information
Runways
Direction	Length and surface
00/00	Concrete
00/00	Concrete
00/00	Concrete

Royal Air Force Tibenham or more simply RAF Tibenham is a former Royal Air Force station located 13.5 miles (21.7 km) southwest of Norwich and 5.8 miles (9.3 km) north of Diss, Norfolk, England.

== History ==
Tibenham was used as a Royal Flying Corps landing ground during the First World War and was known as RFC Tibenham.

No. 51 Squadron RFC and 75 Sqn RFC allegedly used the landing ground.

=== USAAF use ===
The airfield was built up during 1941/42 as a standard heavy bomber airfield with a main runway 6,000 ft long (1,800 m) (03-21) and two secondary runways 4,200 feet (1,300 m) in length (08-26, 15–33). It had an enclosed perimeter track containing 36 frying-pan type hardstands and fourteen loops. Two T-2 hangars were constructed on the eastern side of the airfield and adjacent to the technical site. Accommodations were constructed for about 2,900 personnel. Tibenham was assigned USAAF designation Station 124.

==== 320th Bombardment Group (Medium) ====
The first American units at Tibenham were the personnel of two Martin B-26 Marauder squadrons of the Twelfth Air Force 320th Bombardment Group (Medium) which were en route to La Senia Airfield, Algeria in November 1942. They had no aircraft and their stay was a matter of only a few days. During the summer of 1943, Tibenham was assigned to the 2d Bombardment Wing (later the 2d Air Division) and was used by a few Consolidated B-24 Liberator training aircraft, but it was not until November that the first combat units and their aircraft arrived.

==== 445th Bombardment Group (Heavy) ====
Tibenham became home to the 445th Bombardment Group (Heavy) of the United States Army Air Forces Eighth Air Force. The 445th arrived from Sioux City Army Air Base, Iowa on 4 November 1943. The 445th was assigned to the 2nd Combat Bombardment Wing, and the group tail code was a "Circle-F".

Its operational squadrons were:

- 700th Bombardment Squadron (IS);
- 701st Bombardment Squadron (MK);
- 702d Bombardment Squadron (WV);
- 703d Bombardment Squadron (RN);

The group flew B-24 Liberators as part of the Eighth Air Force's strategic bombing campaign.

The 445th BG entered combat on 13 December 1943 by attacking U-boat installations at Kiel; only fifteen crews were considered fit for this mission which was heavily defended area. The unit operated primarily as a strategic bombardment organization until the war ended, striking such targets as industries in Osnabrück, synthetic oil plants in Lutzendorf, chemical works in Ludwigshafen, marshalling yards at Hamm, an airfield at Munich, an ammunition plant at Duneberg, underground oil storage facilities at Ehmen, and factories at Münster.

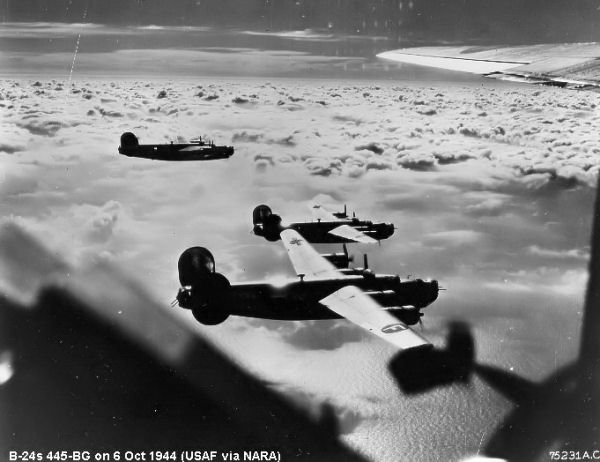
Consolidated B-24 Liberators of the 445th Bomb Group on a mission over enemy-occupied territory.

The group participated in the Allied campaign against the German aircraft industry during Big Week, 20 – 25 February 1944, being awarded a Distinguished Unit Citation for attacking an aircraft assembly plant at Gotha on 24 February. The 389th Group was part of the Gotha mission but after their master bombardier collapsed dropped their bombs before the target and the 445th attacked alone. Thirteen of twenty-five aircraft were lost.

It occasionally flew interdictory and support missions. It helped to prepare for the invasion of Normandy by bombing airfields, V-weapon sites, and other targets. The unit attacked shore installations on D-Day, 6 June 1944 and supported ground forces at Saint-Lô by striking enemy defences in July 1944. During the Battle of the Bulge, December 1944 – January 1945 it bombed German communications. Early on 24 March 1945 dropped food, medical supplies, and ammunition to troops that landed near Wesel during the airborne assault across the Rhine and that afternoon flew a bombing mission to the same area, hitting a landing ground at Stormede.

On occasion the unit dropped propaganda leaflets and hauled fuel to France. Awarded the Croix de Guerre with Palm by the French government for operations in the theatre from December 1943 to February 1945 supplying the resistance.

By far, the 445th's most notorious mission is the Kassel Mission of 27 September 1944. In cloud, the navigator of the lead bomber miscalculated and the 35 planes diverted from the rest of the 2nd Air Division and proceeded to Göttingen some 35 miles (56 km) from the primary. After the bomb run, the group was attacked from the rear by an estimated 150 Luftwaffe planes, resulting in the most concentrated air battle in history. The Luftwaffe unit was a Stormgruppen, a special unit intended to attack bombers by flying in tight formations, up to ten fighters in line abreast. This tactic was intended to break the bomber formation at a single pass. The 361st Fighter Group intervened, preventing a complete destruction of the Group. Twenty-nine German fighters and 26 American planes (25 B-24 bombers and 1 P-51 Mustang) went down in a 15-mile (24 km) radius. Only four 445th planes made it back to the base; two made emergency landings at RAF Manston, two crashed in France, one in Belgium, another crashed near RAF Old Buckenham—representing an 88.5% total casualty rate.

The 445th Bomb Group flew its last combat mission on 25 April 1945. It departed Tibenham and returned to Fort Dix AAF New Jersey on 28 May 1945.

James Stewart, the film actor, was 703rd Squadron Commander with the 445th when it arrived at Tibenham. He flew 10 operational missions with the 445th Bomb Group before being transferred to the 453rd Bomb Group at RAF Old Buckenham in March, 1944

== Postwar use ==
The Americans left in late May 1945 and on 15 July the airfield reverted to the Air Ministry becoming a Maintenance Unit satellite.

No. 4247 Anti-Aircraft Flight RAF Regiment was posted here at some point.

Although part of the airfield was sold off in 1952, the main runway was lengthened in 1955 for possible use by jet aircraft. However it was never utilized and Tibenham was closed in 1959, being sold during 1964/65.

== Current use ==
Since 1960 the airfield has been used for peaceful recreation by the sailplanes of the Norfolk Gliding Club. In civilian hands most of the wartime airfield buildings were demolished; however, there are a few derelict huts and other structures on some of the dispersed sites which lay to the east between the airfield and the main London-Norwich railway line. Most of the main runway with its postwar extension still exists, along with both secondary runways. The perimeter track and various hardstands, however, have been removed for hardcore.

The control tower was used until 1975 as a club house by the Gliding Club. Later that year the club moved into a new home which was constructed nearby. The old control tower was demolished in 1978 after the new clubhouse came into use. Current projects include plans for a Heritage Centre to preserve the history of the airfield and the connection with the 445th Bomb Group.

A memorial to the Liberator crews stands on the airfield.

== Trivia ==
Tibenham Airfield was used as a location for the Dad's Army episode; Round and Round went the Great Big Wheel.

== See also ==
- List of former Royal Air Force stations
