= 445th Operations Group =

445th Operations Group

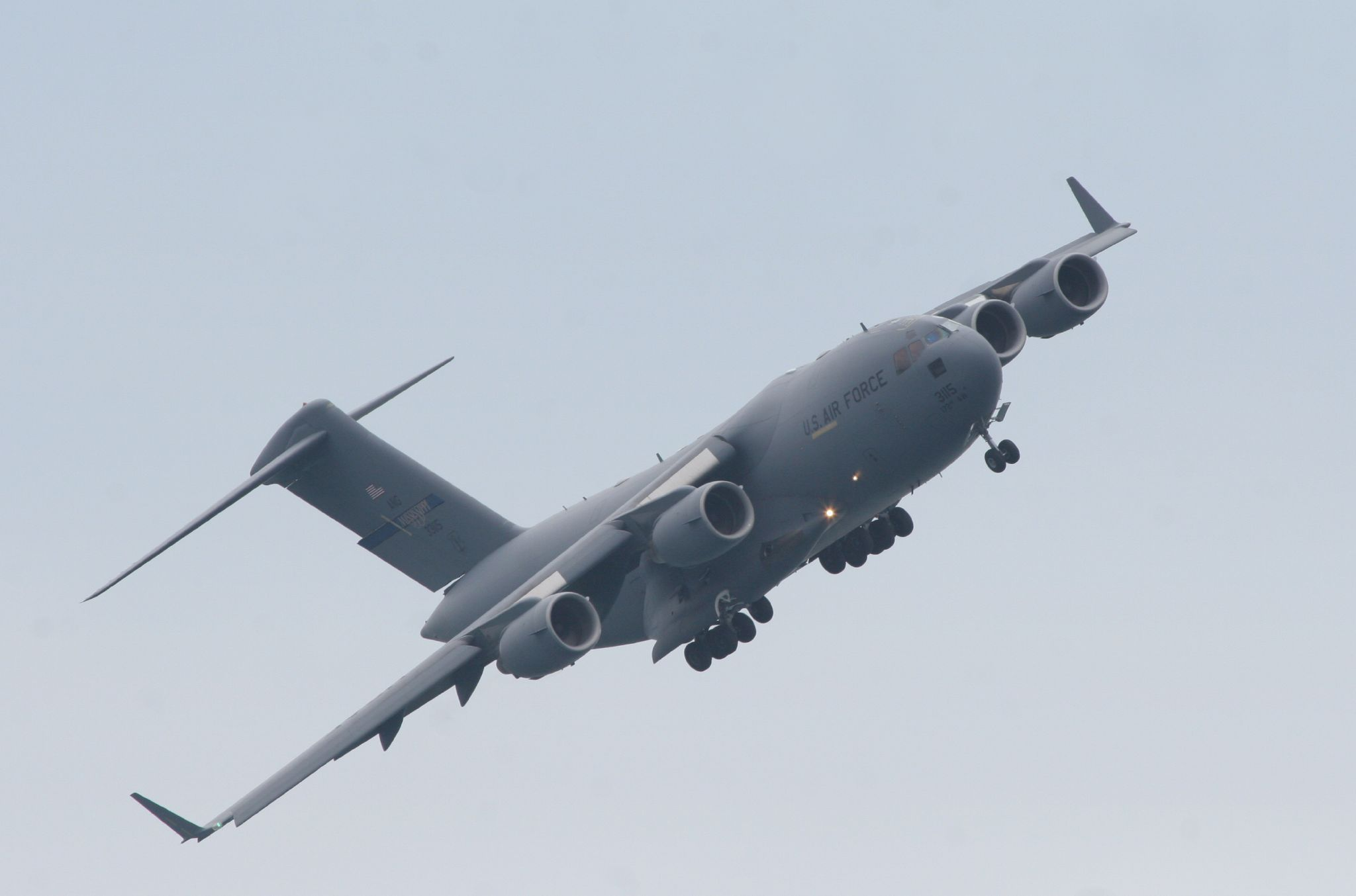
- McDonnell Douglas C-17 Globemaster III
- Active: 1943–1945; 1947–1949; 1952–1958; 1992–1994; 1994–present
- Country: United States
- Branch: United States Air Force
- Role: Airlift
- Part of: Air Force Reserve Command
- Garrison/HQ: Wright-Patterson Air Force Base
- Engagements: European Theater of Operations
- Decorations: Distinguished Unit Citation; French Croix de Guerre with Palm

Commanders
- Current commander: Col. Raymond A. Smith, JR.

Insignia
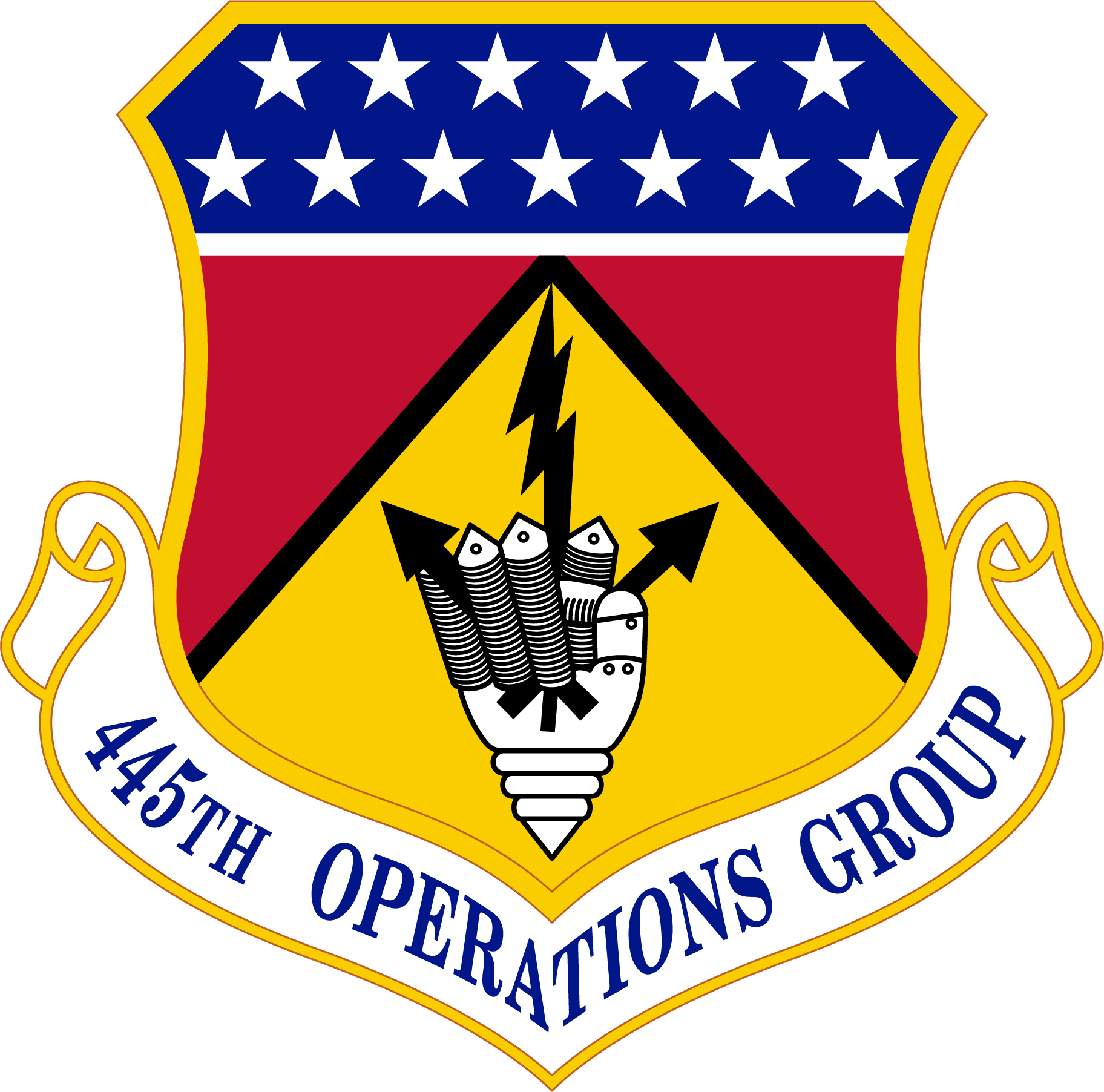
- 445th Operations Group Emblem

The 445th Operations Group is the flying component of the 445th Airlift Wing, assigned to Fourth Air Force of the United States Air Force Reserve. The group is stationed at Wright-Patterson Air Force Base, Ohio.

The group was first activated during World War II as the 445th Bombardment Group, a Consolidated B-24 Liberator unit stationed in England with VIII Bomber Command. The 445th was stationed at RAF Tibenham in late 1943. The group earned a Distinguished Unit Citation on 24 February 1944 for attacking an aircraft assembly plant at Gotha, in Central Germany, losing thirteen aircraft. The 445th also earned the French Croix de Guerre with Palm for its operations supporting the liberation of France. The 445th was actor Jimmy Stewart's original bombardment group.

The United States Air Force reactivated the group in the Air Force Reserve in 1947. In June 1949 it was inactivated when Continental Air Command reorganized its reserve units under the wing base reorganization plan.

After the Korean War, the group was again active at as the 445th Fighter-Bomber Group, the operational element of the 445th Fighter-Bomber Wing near Buffalo, New York. In 1957 the group moved to Memphis Municipal Airport, where it replaced the 319th Fighter-Bomber Group and converted to a troop carrier mission when USAF decided to concentrate its reserve fighter resources in the Air National Guard. The group was inactivated a year later when its parent wing converted to the dual deputy organization and its operational squadrons were assigned directly to the 445th Troop Carrier Wing.

In 1992 the group once again assumed its role as the operational element of the 445th Airlift Wing under the USAF objective wing organization and became an associate unit of the active duty 63d Operations Group. The following year, the group moved to March Air Reserve Base, California when Norton Air Force Base closed. In spring 1994 the active duty 63d Airlift Wing and its elements inactivated and reserve airlift units joined with the air refueling units already assigned to the 452d Air Mobility Wing or inactivated. The 445th was activated again later that year at Wright-Patterson as a Lockheed C-141 Starlifter organization.

== Overview ==
The 445th Operations Group is a unit of Air Force Reserve Command that in the event of mobilization would be gained by Air Mobility Command. it is currently assigned nine McDonnell Douglas C-17 Globemaster III aircraft. The 445 Operation Group's mission is to attain and maintain operational readiness; provide strategic transport of personnel and equipment; provide aeromedical evacuation; and recruit and train toward these goals.

== Assigned units ==
- 89th Airlift Squadron
- 445th Aeromedical Evacuation Squadron
- 445th Operations Support Squadron
- 445th Airlift Control Flight

== History ==
=== World War II ===
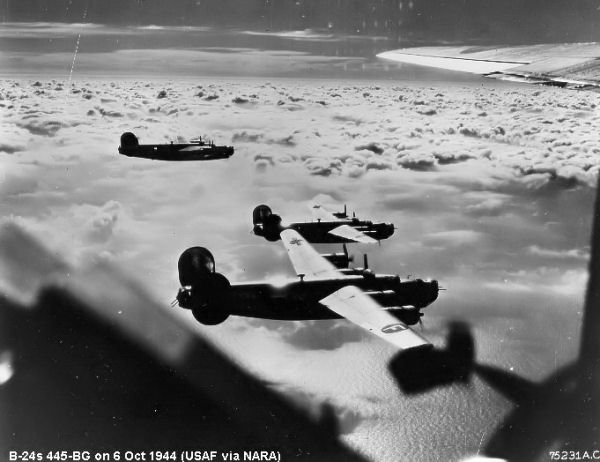
B-24 Liberators of the 445th Bomb Group on a mission over enemy-occupied territory

The 445th Bombardment Group was activated 1 April 1943 at Gowen Field in Idaho, where initial organization took place while key personnel traveled to Orlando Army Air Base, Florida for training with the Army Air Forces School of Applied Tactics. Its original components were the 700th, 701st, 702d, and 703d Bombardment Squadrons. Both elements met at Wendover Army Air Field, Utah on 8 June 1943, where initial training with the Consolidated B-24 Liberator took place. While the group was at Wendover, it was joined by actor Jimmy Stewart as the operations officer, then the commander of the 703d Bombardment Squadron. The group moved to Sioux City Army Air Base, Iowa in July 1943 to complete training. In late August and early September, the group lost three B-24s to training accidents. In September the group began to receive B-24H aircraft, the model of the Liberator they would fly in combat.

On 20 October 1943 the ground echelon moved to Camp Shanks, New York and embarked on the RMS Queen Mary on 26 October 1943, sailing next day. The unit arrived in the Firth of Clyde, Scotland on 2 November 1943 and disembarked at Gourock. The air echelon departed Sioux City late in October 1943 and flew to the United Kingdom via the southern route: Florida, Puerto Rico, Brazil, and West Africa, although one plane was lost en route. Upon arrival in England, the group was assigned to the 2nd Combat Bombardment Wing and stationed at RAF Tibenham in East Anglia. The group was initially given a tail code of "Circle-F".

The 445th entered combat on 13 December 1943 by attacking U-boat installations at Kiel. Only fifteen crews were considered fit for this mission, a heavily defended area. It suffered its first combat loss on 20 December in an attack against Bremen. The unit operated primarily as a strategic bombardment organization until the war ended, striking such targets as industries in Osnabrück, synthetic oil plants in Lutzendorf, chemical works in Ludwigshafen, marshalling yards at Hamm, an airfield at Munich, an ammunition plant at Duneberg, underground oil storage facilities at Ehmen, and factories at Münster.

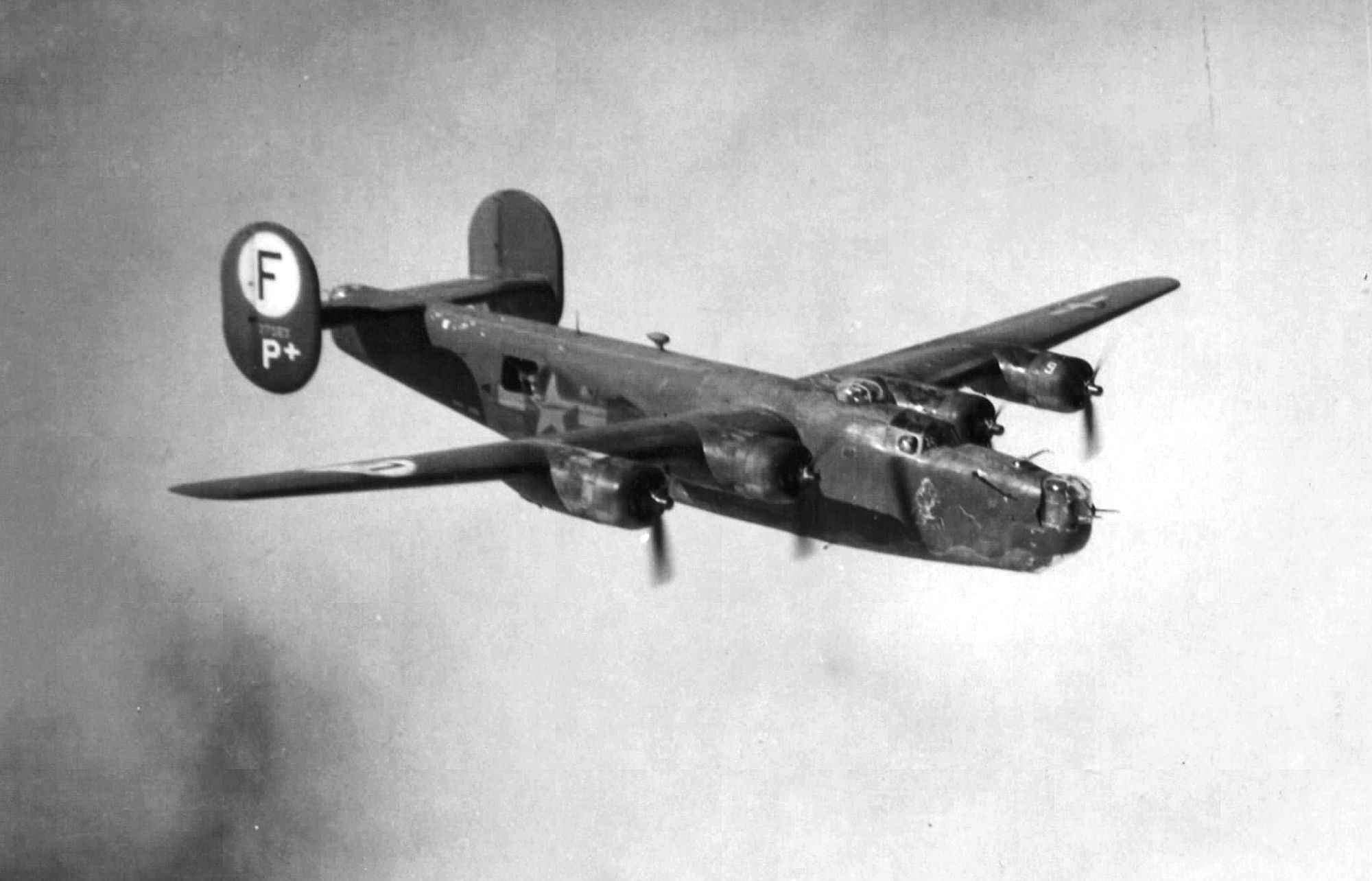
B-24 of 701st Bombardment Squadron Showing Group Circle F tail marking

The group participated in the Allied campaign against the German aircraft industry during Big Week, from 20 to 25 February 1944, being awarded a Distinguished Unit Citation for attacking a Messerschmitt Bf 110 aircraft assembly plant at Gotha on 24 February. Thirteen of the group's twenty-five attacking aircraft were lost along with 122 aircrew. This was the longest running, continuous air battle of World War II – some two and a half hours of fighter attacks and flak en route and leaving the target area. Bomb damage assessment photographs showed that the plant was knocked out of production indefinitely.

The group occasionally flew air interdiction and air support missions. It helped to prepare for the invasion of Normandy by bombing airfields, V-1 flying bomb and V-2 rocket launch sites, and other targets. The unit attacked shore installations on D-Day, 6 June 1944 with 81 sorties and supported ground forces at Saint-Lô by striking enemy defenses in July 1944. During the Battle of the Bulge, between December 1944 and January 1945 it bombed German communications. Early on 24 March 1945 the 445th dropped food, medical supplies, and ammunition to troops that landed near Wesel during Operation Varsity, the airborne assault across the Rhine and that afternoon flew a bombing mission to the same area, hitting a landing ground at Stormede.

On occasion the unit dropped propaganda leaflets and hauled fuel to France. It was awarded the Croix de Guerre with Palm by the French government for operations in the theater from December 1943 to February 1945 supplying the resistance.

By far, the 445th's most tragic mission is the attack on Kassel of 27 September 1944. In cloud, the navigator of the lead bomber miscalculated and the 35 planes left the bomber stream of the 2d Air Division and proceeded to Göttingen some 35 miles (56 km) from the primary target. After the bomb run, the group was attacked from the rear by an estimated 150 Luftwaffe planes, resulting in the most concentrated air battle in history. The Luftwaffe unit was a Sturmgruppe, a special unit intended to attack bombers by flying in tight formations of up to ten fighters in line abreast. This was intended to break the bomber formation at a single pass. The 361st Fighter Group intervened, preventing complete destruction of the Group. Twenty-nine German and 25 American planes went down in a 15-mile (24 km) radius. Only four 445th planes returned to the base – two crashing in France, one in Belgium, another at RAF Old Buckenham. Two landed at RAF Manston. Despite only one of the 35 attacked aircraft were fit to fly next day, the 445th sent 10 planes to the same target, Kassel.

After the end of the air war in Europe, the 445th flew low level "Trolley" missions over Germany carrying ground personnel so they could see the result of their efforts during the war. The group's air echelon departed Tibenham on 17 May 1945, and departed the United Kingdom on 20 May 1945. The 703rd BS ground echelon sailed on USAT Argentina from Southampton and the other squadrons on the USAT Cristobal from Bristol. Both ships arrived at New York on 8 June 1945. Personnel were given 30 days R&R. The group reestablished at Fort Dix, New Jersey, with the exception of the air echelon, which had flown to Sioux Falls Army Air Field, South Dakota. Most personnel were discharged or transferred to other units, and only a handful were left when the group was inactivated on 12 September 1945.

During World War II, the group flew 280 missions, losing 138 B-24s.

=== Cold War ===
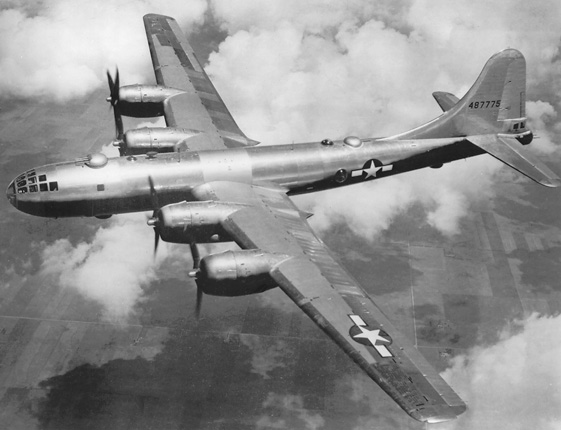
B-29 Superfortress

The 445th Bombardment Group was activated again in the reserve during the summer of 1947 at McChord Field, Washington as a Boeing B-29 Superfortress very heavy bombardment group and assigned two of its World War II squadrons, the 700th and 701st. By the end of the summer it added two additional squadrons located at Hill Field, Utah, the 15th and 702d Bombardment Squadrons. At the beginning of 1948 it added a third squadron at McChord, the 703d, although the squadron moved away in May and was reassigned. The group was inactivated in June 1949 when Continental Air Command reorganized to the wing base organization. It was replaced at McChord by the 302d Troop Carrier Group of the 302d Troop Carrier Wing. It does not appear that the squadrons at Hill were ever equipped with aircraft and reserve training at Hill was continued by the 9013th Volunteer Air Reserve Training Wing.

The group was activated again in the reserves as the 445th Fighter-Bomber Group, an element of the 445th Fighter-Bomber Wing in 1952 at Buffalo Municipal Airport, New York with the 700th, 701st and 702d Fighter-Bomber Squadrons assigned. Although designated as a fighter unit, until 1955 the group primarily flew North American T-6 aircraft, although it was equipped with a few North American F-51 Mustangs and Lockheed F-80 Shooting Stars. In 1955 the group moved a few miles to Niagara Falls Municipal Airport and converted to the Republic F-84 Thunderjet.

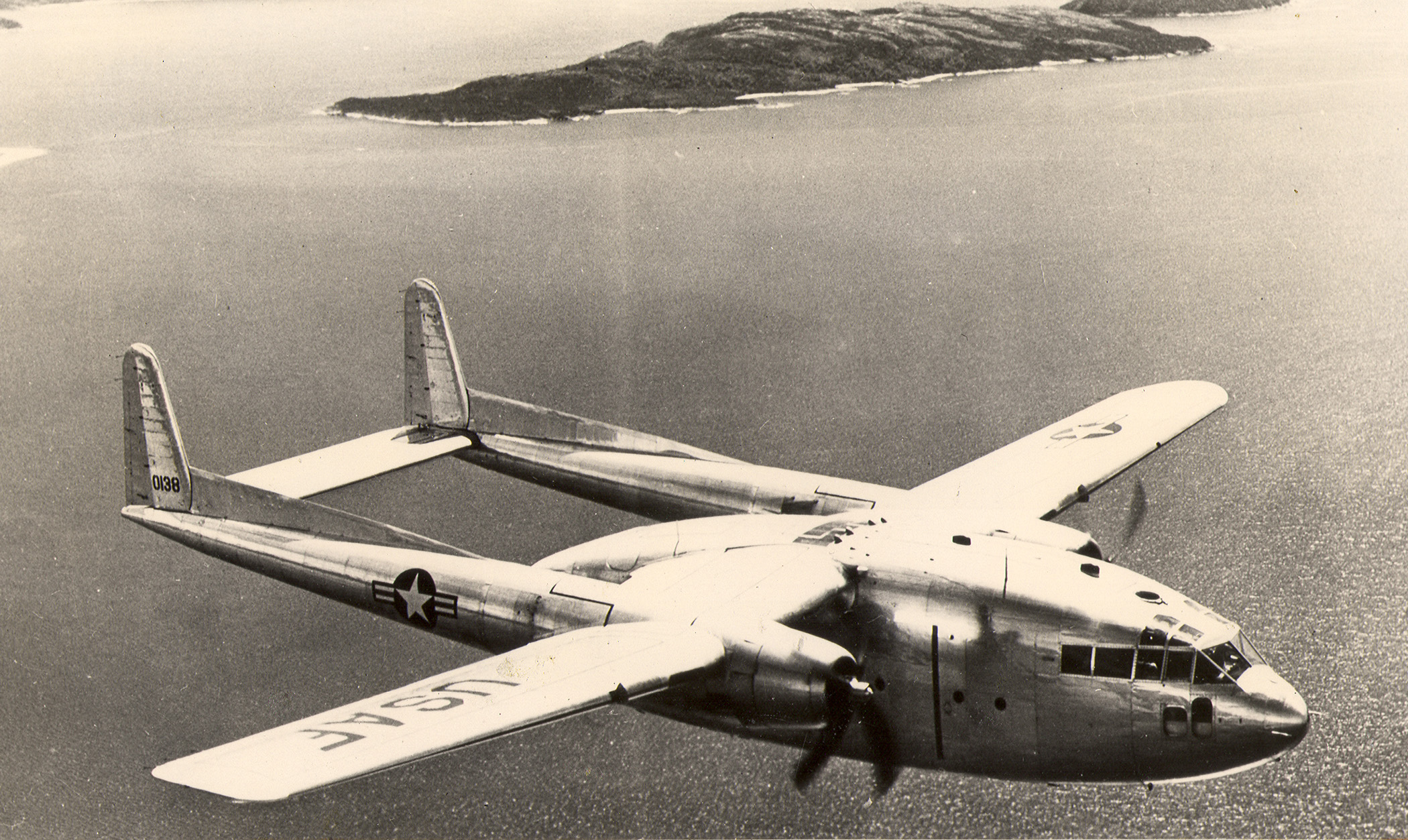
Fairchild C-119 of the Air Force Reserve

In 1957 the United States Air Force realigned its reserve forces, transferring all fighter aircraft to the Air National Guard, while Air Force reserve organizations flew tactical airlift aircraft. As a result, the 445th redesignated as the 445th Troop Carrier Group in September and its remaining squadron began training in Fairchild C-119 Flying Boxcar aircraft. In July 1957 reserve operations at Niagara Falls had been reduced to a single squadron when the 701st and 702d squadrons inactivated. In mid-November 1957 the 445th Group moved to Memphis Municipal Airport, Tennessee, where it replaced the 319th Fighter-Bomber Group and reserve operations at Niagara Falls were transferred to the 64th Troop Carrier Squadron. The 445th wing and the 700th squadron moved to Dobbins Air Force Base, Georgia at the same time. Simultaneously, the 701st and 702d Troop Carrier Squadrons were reactivated and joined the group at its new station, while the 357th Troop Carrier Squadron at Donaldson Air Force Base, South Carolina was reassigned to the group.

In November, Continental Air Command reorganized under the dual deputy system. The group was inactivated, and its squadrons transferred directly to the 445th Troop Carrier Wing.

=== Modern era ===
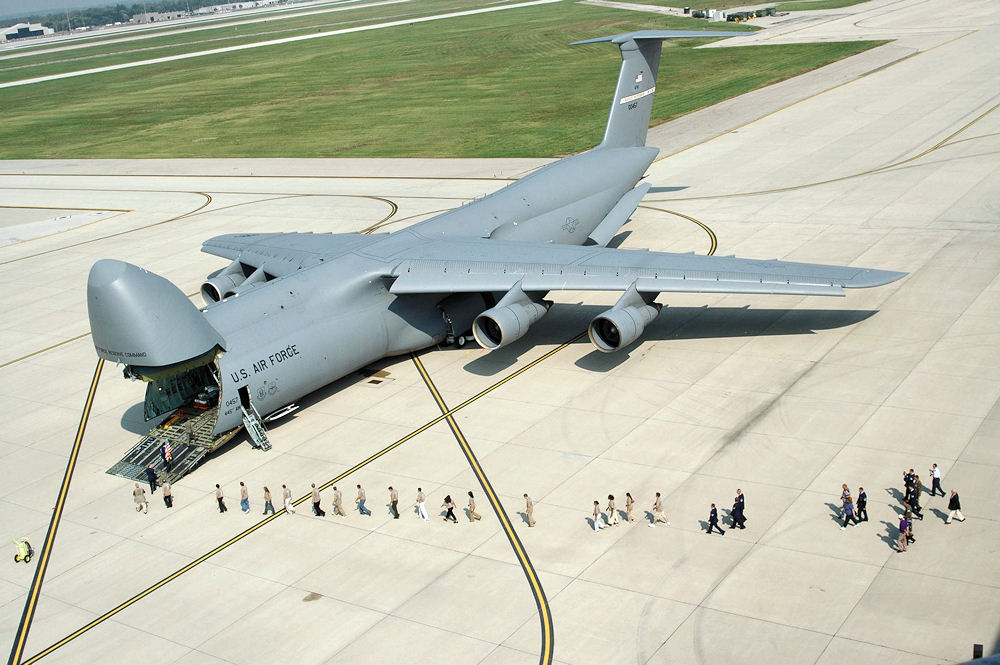
Lockheed C-5A Galaxy, serial 70-0457, City of Fairborn of the 89th Airlift Squadron was the first C-5 transferred to Wright Patterson AFB

In 1992 the group once again assumed its role as the operational element of the 445th Airlift Wing under the USAF Objective Wing organization. The 445th wing had been a reserve associate of the active duty 63d Airlift Wing at Norton Air Force Base, California since 1973. Under the reserve associate concept, the 445th wing had no aircraft of its own, but its reservists flew and maintained the 63d wing's aircraft alongside the regular airman assigned to the 63d. In the summer of 1992, the group was again activated as the 445th Operations Group and became an associate unit of the active duty 63d Operations Group. The 729th and 730th Airlift Squadrons were reassigned from the wing to the group, while the 445th Operations Support Flight was activated under the group.

The following year both wings and their subordinate elements moved to March Air Reserve Base, California when Norton closed. Air Mobility Command had combined airlift and air refueling units at a number of locations into what were designated Air Mobility Wings. In the spring of 1994 the 63d Airlift Wing and its elements inactivated at March and reserve airlift units were joined with the air refueling units already assigned to the 452d Air Mobility Wing, while the 445th wing and group inactivated.

The 445th was activated again later that year at Wright-Patterson Air Force Base, Ohio as a Lockheed C-141 Starlifter organization. It absorbed two squadrons already stationed at Wright-Patterson, the 89th Airlift Squadron from the 906th Operations Group and the 356th Airlift Squadron from the 907th Operations Group.

In 2006, the 356th inactivated while the 89th and the 445th converted to Lockheed C-5 Galaxys and in 2011 to McDonnell Douglas C-17s. The group trained for and flew strategic airlift missions worldwide, performing channel flights and special assignment airlift missions. It participated in various contingency and humanitarian operations and training exercises. The group also tested and calibrated the laser detection and ranging (LADAR) system.

=== Lineage ===
- Established as the 445 Bombardment Group (Heavy) on 20 March 1943

Activated on 1 April 1943
Redesignated 445 Bombardment Group, Heavy on 20 August 1943
Inactivated on 12 September 1945

- Redesignated 445 Bombardment Group, Very Heavy on 13 May 1947

Activated in the reserve on 12 July 1947
Inactivated on 27 June 1949

- Redesignated 445 Fighter-Bomber Group on 24 June 1952

Activated in the Reserve on 8 July 1952
Redesignated 445 Troop Carrier Group, Medium on 6 September 1957
Inactivated on 25 September 1958

- Redesignated: 445 Military Airlift Group on 31 July 1985 (Remained inactive)
- Redesignated: 445 Operations Group and activated in the Reserve on 1 August 1992

Inactivated on 1 May 1994

- Activated in the reserve on 1 October 1994

=== Assignments ===
- II Bomber Command, 1 April 1943
- Second Air Force, 6 October 1943
- Eighth Air Force, c. 2 November 1943
- VIII Bomber Command, 5 November 1943
- 2d Bombardment Division, 9 November 1943
- 2d Combat Bombardment Wing, November 1943
- Air Transport Command, 9 June – 12 September 1945
- 305th Bombardment Wing (later 305th Air Division), 12 July 1947 – 27 June 1949
- 445th Fighter-Bomber Wing (later 445 Troop Carrier Wing), 8 July 1952 – 25 September 1958
- 445th Airlift Wing, 1 August 1992 – 1 May 1994
- 445th Airlift Wing, 1 October 1994 – present

=== Components ===
- 15th Bombardment Squadron: 1 August 1947 – 27 June 1949

Located at Hill Field (later Hill AFB), Utah

- 89th Airlift Squadron: 1 October 1994 – present
- 356th Airlift Squadron: 1 October 1994 – 30 June 2006
- 357th Troop Carrier Squadron: 16 November 1957 – 25 March 1958

Located at Donaldson AFB, South Carolina

- 445th Aeromedical Evacuation Squadron: 1 October 1994 – present
- 700th Bombardment Squadron (later Fighter-Bomber Squadron, Troop Carrier Squadron, Airlift Squadron): 1 April 1943 – 12 September 1945; 12 July 1947 – 27 June 1949; 8 July 1952 – 25 September 1958 (detached to 445th Troop Carrier Wing after 16 November 1957)
- 701st Bombardment Squadron (later Fighter-Bomber Squadron, Troop Carrier Squadron, Airlift Squadron): 1 April 1943 – 12 September 1945; 12 July 1947 – 27 June 1949; 8 July 1952 – 1 July 1957; 16 November 1957 – 25 September 1958
- 702d Bombardment Squadron (later Fighter-Bomber Squadron, Troop Carrier Squadron): 1 April 1943 – 12 September 1945; 1 August 1947 – 27 June 1949; 8 July 1952 – 1 July 1957; 16 November 1957 – 25 September 1958

Located at Hill Field (later Hill AFB), Utah from 1947 to 1949

- 703d Bombardment Squadron: 1 April 1943 – 12 September 1945; 1 January 1948 – 28 May 1948
- 729th Airlift Squadron: 1 August 1992 – 1 May 1994
- 730th Airlift Squadron: 1 August 1992 – 1 May 1994
- 445th Airlift Support Flight: 1 August 1992 – 1 May 1994; 1 October 1994 – present
- 445th Operations Support Flight (later 445th Operations Support Squadron): 1 August 1992 – 1 May 1994; 1 October 1994 – present

=== Stations ===
- Gowen Field, Idaho, 1 April 1943
- Wendover Field, Utah, 8 June 1943
- Sioux City Army Air Base, Iowa, 8 July – 20 October 1943
- RAF Tibenham (AAF Station 124), England, 4 November 1943 – 28 May 1945
- Fort Dix Army Air Base, New Jersey, 9 June – 12 September 1945
- McChord Field (later McChord AFB), Washington, 12 July 1947 – 27 June 1949
- Buffalo Municipal Airport, New York, 8 July 1952
- Niagara Falls Municipal Airport, New York, 15 June 1955
- Memphis Municipal Airport, Tennessee, 16 November 1957 – 25 September 1958
- Norton Air Force Base, California, 1 August 1992
- March Air Force Base, California, 1 July 1993 – 1 May 1994
- Wright-Patterson AFB, Ohio, 1 October 1994–present

=== Aircraft ===
- Consolidated B-24 Liberator, 1943–1945
- Boeing B-29 Superfortress, 1947–1949
- North Ammerican T-6 Texan, 1953–1955
- North American F-51 Mustang, 1953–1954
- Lockheed F-80 Shooting Star, 1953–1956
- Republic F-84 Thunderjet, 1955–1957
- Fairchild C-119 Flying Boxcar, 1957–1958
- Lockheed C-141 Starlifter, 1992–1994; 1994–2006
- Lockheed C-5 Galaxy, 2006–2011
- Boeing C-17 Globemaster III, 2011–present
