= 445th Airlift Wing =

445th Airlift Wing

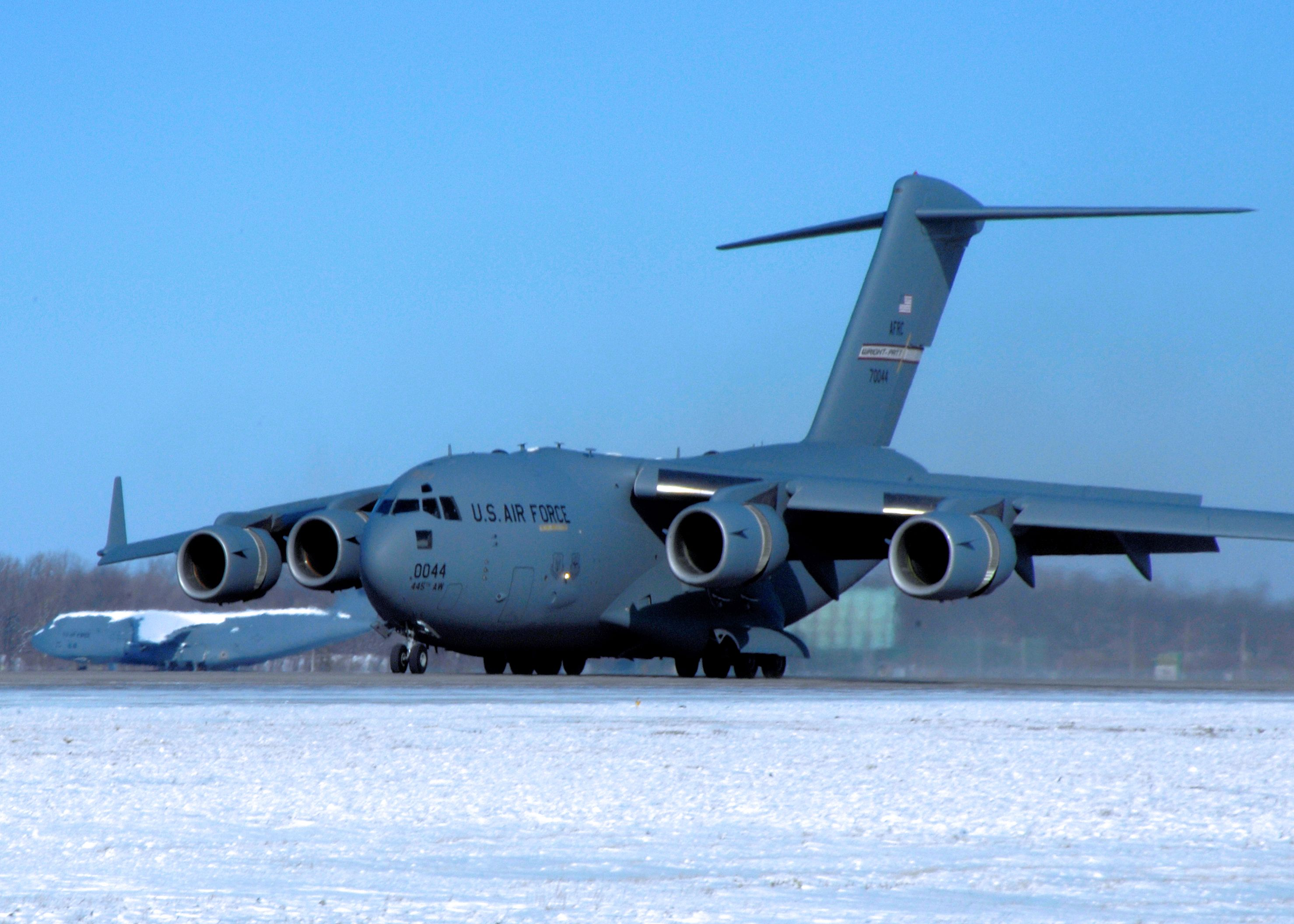
- 445th Airlift Wing C-17 Globemaster III (Note: Aircraft is McDonnell Douglas C-17A Globemaster III, serial 97-0044.)
- Active: 1952–1971; 1973–1994; 1994–present
- Country: United States
- Branch: United States Air Force
- Type: Wing
- Role: Airlift
- Size: 1950 reservists
- Part of: Air Force Reserve Command
- Garrison/HQ: Wright-Patterson Air Force Base, Ohio
- Nickname: The Bison Wing (1955–1964)
- Decorations: Air Force Outstanding Unit Award; Republic of Vietnam Gallantry Cross with Palm

Commanders
- Current commander: Col. Douglas A. Perry

Insignia
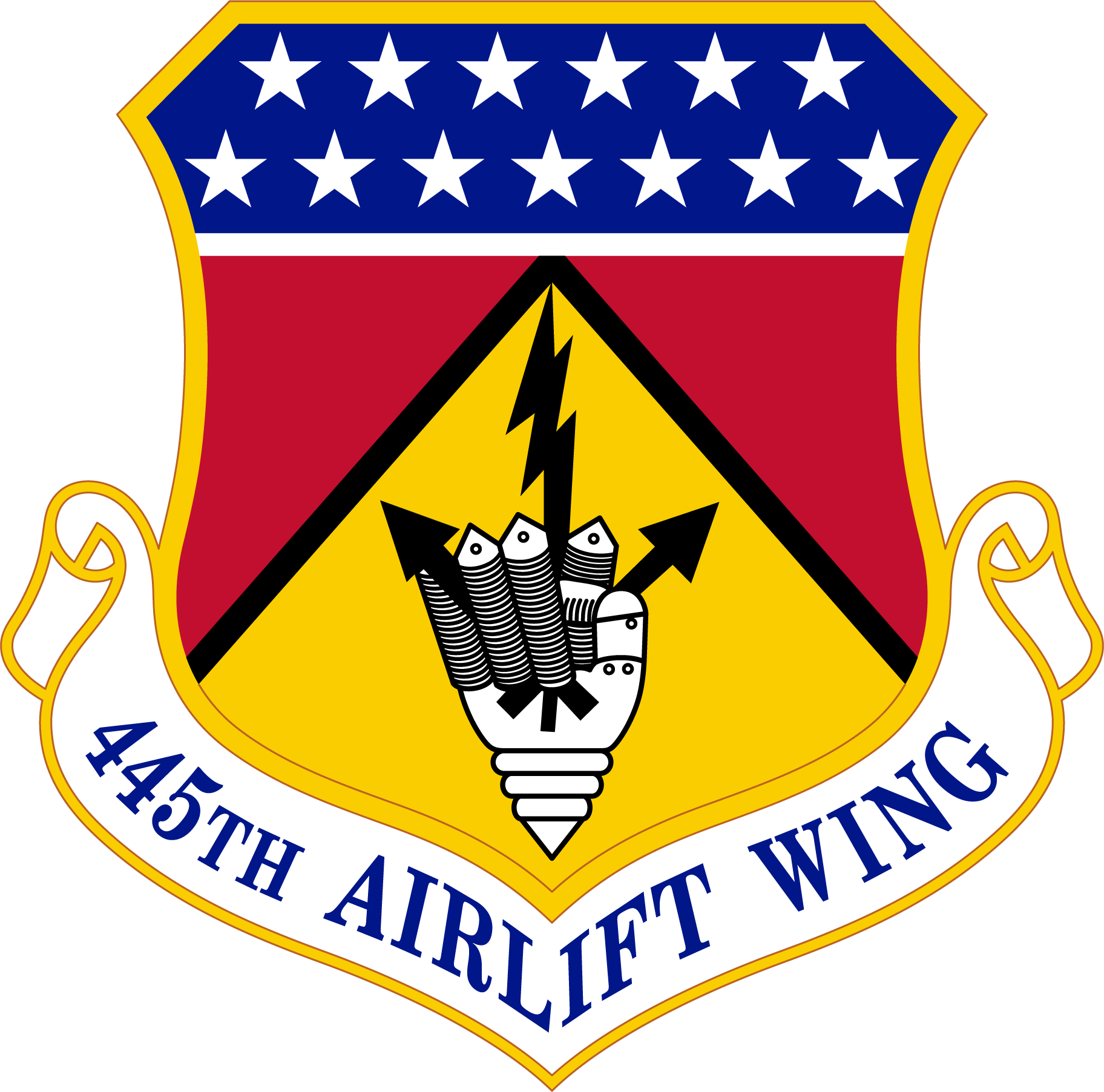
- 445th Airlift Wing emblem (Note: Approved 19 August 1963. Description: Per chevron gules and or, in pale a gauntlet argent grasping a lightning bolt palewise and two arrows saltirewise sable, on a chief azure a fillet of the third [color] thirteen mullets six and seven of the like [color], all within a diminished bordure of the last [color].)

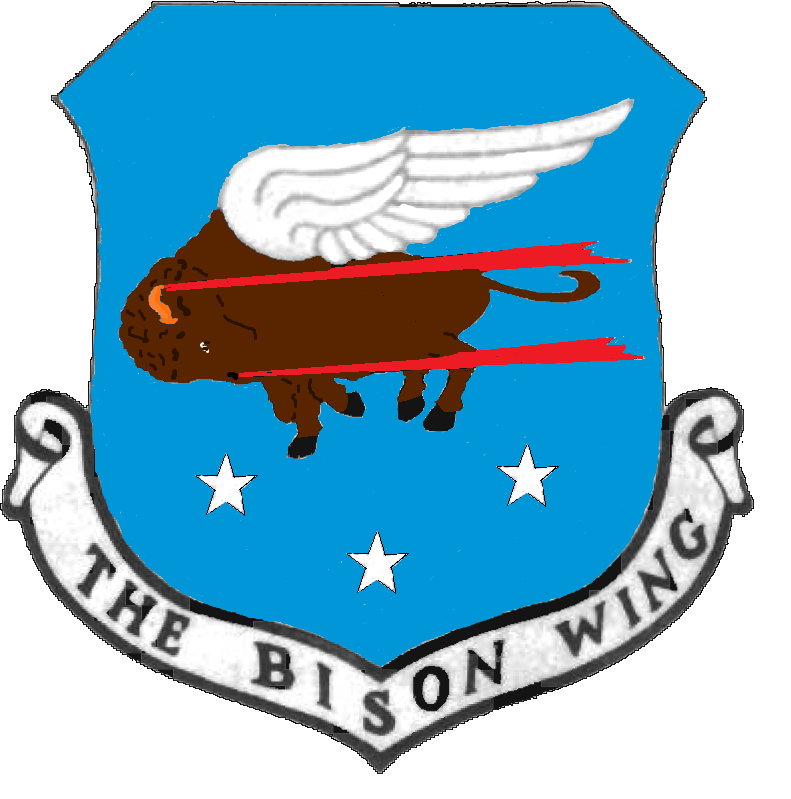
- 445th Fighter-Bomber Wing emblem (Note: Approved 7 September 1955. Description: Azure, a snorting bison proper, winged argent, with streaks of fire proper, issuing from his horns and nostrils, in base three stars of the third [color])
- Tail stripe: White, "Wright-Patterson" in red

Aircraft flown
- Transport: C-17 Globemaster III

The 445th Airlift Wing is an Air Reserve Component of the United States Air Force. It is assigned to the Fourth Air Force, Air Force Reserve Command, stationed at Wright-Patterson Air Force Base, Ohio. If mobilized, the wing is gained by the Air Mobility Command.

== Mission ==
The 445th Airlift Wing flies the Boeing C-17 Globemaster III, which is capable of delivering troops and cargo to main operating bases or forward operating bases.

The mission of the 445th Airlift Wing is to provide strategic transport of personnel and equipment worldwide and to provide aeromedical evacuation. The wing accomplishes this task by recruiting and training personnel to attain and maintain operational readiness. The wing is composed of nearly 2000 airmen, approximately separated into 250 officers and 1700 enlisted personnel. To facilitate day-to-day operations the wing employs approximately 350 Air Reserve Technicians who work full-time for the unit.

== Units ==
The 445th Airlift Wing consists of the following major units:

- 445th Operations Group

89th Airlift Squadron - Boeing C-17 Globemaster III
445th Aeromedical Evacuation Squadron

- 445th Maintenance Group
- 445th Mission Support Group
- 445th Medical Group

== History ==
for related history, see 445th Operations Group

=== Reserve fighter operations ===
The wing was first activated on 24 June 1952 at Buffalo, New York as the 445th Fighter-Bomber Wing. Its initial equipment was the North American T-6 Texan, which remained its primary aircraft until 1955. It began to receive North American F-51 Mustangs and Lockheed F-80 Shooting Stars the following year. The wing and its components moved to nearby Niagara Falls Municipal Airport, where it received Republic F-84 Thunderjets, in 1955. Despite the wing's "Fighter-Bomber" designation, reserve fighter bomber wings had an air defense role if mobilized.

In 1956, The Joint Chiefs of Staff were pressuring the Air Force to provide more wartime airlift. At the same time, about 150 Fairchild C-119 Flying Boxcars became available from the active force. Consequently, in November 1956 the Air Force directed Continental Air Command (ConAC) to convert three fighter bomber wings to the troop carrier mission by September 1957. In addition, within the Air Staff was a recommendation that the reserve fighter mission given to the Air National Guard and replaced by the troop carrier mission. Cuts in the budget in 1957 led to a reduction in the number of reserve wings from 24 to 15. As a result of these reductions, the 445th's fighter operations at Niagara Falls ceased, and it began to train with the Fairchild C-119 Flying Boxcar. In November, the wing was replaced by a single squadron, the 64th Troop Carrier Squadron.

=== Troop carrier operations and move to Georgia ===
The termination of reserve fighter operations at Niagara Falls did not end the wing's life. Shortly before the termination of wing level operations there, another reserve fighter wing, the 482d Fighter-Bomber Wing at Dobbins Air Force Base, Georgia, inactivated and transferred its personnel and equipment to the 445th, which moved to Dobbins on paper.

Since 1955, the Air Force had been detaching Air Force Reserve squadrons from their parent wing locations to separate sites. Communities were more likely to accept the smaller squadrons than the large wings and the location of separate squadrons in smaller population centers would facilitate recruiting and manning. In time, the detached squadron program proved successful in attracting additional participants When the wing moved to Dobbins, only the 700th Troop Carrier Squadron was located with wing headquarters. The 701st, and 702d Troop Carrier Squadron were both stationed at Memphis Municipal Airport under what was called the Dispersed Squadron Concept.

The wing began to use inactive duty training periods for Operation Swift Lift, transporting high priority cargo for the air force and Operation Ready Swap, transporting aircraft engines, between Air Materiel Command's depots. It was reorganized in September 1958 under the Dual Deputy model. (Note: Under this plan flying [and missile] squadrons reported to the wing Deputy Commander for Operations and maintenance squadrons reported to the wing Deputy Commander for Maintenance.) The 445th Troop Carrier Group was inactivated, and the flying squadrons were assigned directly to the wing. Simultaneously, the wing was redesignated as an assault troop carrier organization and began conversion to Fairchild C-123 Providers. The wing initially trained with the 2589th Air Reserve Flying Center, but in 1958, the center was inactivated and some of its personnel were absorbed by the wing. In place of active duty support for reserve units, ConAC adopted the Air Reserve Technician Program, in which a cadre of the unit consisted of full-time personnel who were simultaneously civilian employees of the Air Force and held rank as members of the reserves.

=== Activation of groups under the wing ===
Although the dispersal of flying units under the Detached Squadron Concept was not a problem when the entire wing was called to active service, mobilizing a single flying squadron and elements to support it proved difficult. This weakness was demonstrated in the partial mobilization of reserve units during the Berlin Crisis of 1961.

To resolve the mobilization problem, at the start of 1962 ConAC determined to reorganize its reserve wings by establishing groups with support elements for each of its troop carrier squadrons. This reorganization would facilitate mobilization of elements of wings in various combinations when needed. However, as this plan was entering its implementation phase, another partial mobilization, which included the 445th Wing, occurred for the Cuban Missile Crisis, with the units being released on 22 November 1962. The formation of troop carrier groups was delayed until February for wings that had been mobilized. The 918th Troop Carrier Group at Dobbins and the 919th and 920th Troop Carrier Groups at Memphis, were all assigned to the wing on 11 February.

=== Conversion to heavy airlift ===
On 8 July 1965, the 700th Squadron at Dobbins started conversion to the Douglas C-124 Globemaster II and on 1 October, the Wing became the 445th Troop Carrier Wing, Heavy. In December, reserve flying operations at Memphis ceased and the 919th and 920th Groups and their components were inactivated. In their place, the 915th Air Transport Group at Homestead Air Force Base, Florida became part of the wing when the 435th Troop Carrier Wing at Homestead inactivated. With the change to heavy airlift the wing's gaining command changed from Tactical Air Command briefly to Military Air Transport Service, then to Military Airlift Command, accompanied by redesignations as the 445th Air Transport Wing, then the 445th Military Airlift Wing.

The wing was activated when the USS Pueblo, an intelligence-gathering ship, was seized off the coast of North Korea. The 445th was mobilized at Dobbins on 26 January 1968 and was released in June 1969. During the mobilization, the 904th Military Airlift Group, stationed at Stewart Air Force Base, New York was also assigned to the wing. In the spring of 1971, the 915th Group was reassigned away from the wing in preparation for its inactivation. The 445th Military Airlift Wing was now reduced to a single group, the 918th. The wing was inactivated and the 918th Group was reassigned to the 459th Military Airlift Wing on 29 June 1971.

=== Wright-Patterson AFB Ohio ===
The 445th Airlift Wing was activated at Wright-Patterson Air Force Base, 1 October 1994 and again flew the C-141 Starlifter. It was composed primarily of personnel from the 906th Fighter Group at Wright-Patterson and the 907th Tactical Airlift Group at Rickenbacker Air National Guard Base, which were both inactivated the previous day. From its new location, the wing provided support to Operation Southern Watch, the enforcement of the no fly zone in southern Iraq, and Operation Deny Flight, the United Nations no fly zone over Bosnia Herzegovina.

=== Global War on Terror ===
The wing was active in the wake of the 11 September attacks in 2001 by providing emergency airlift of supplies, medical teams and Federal Emergency Management Agency personnel to McGuire Air Force Base, to assist with operations after the World Trade Center collapse. The wing was also an active participant in Operation Enduring Freedom by being the first wing to fly Taliban and al-Qaeda detainees to Guantanamo Bay Naval Base, Cuba. Since the initial detainee flights, the 445th Airlift Wing has delivered about half of the detainees housed at Guantanamo Bay. The wing also served in the mission of evacuating wounded personnel from battlefield in Asia to regional treatment facilities and bringing fallen service members home for burial.

The 445th has continued to provide an active role for Operation Iraqi Freedom. The C-141 staging point for all Air Force Reserve C-141s was established at Wright-Patterson Air Force Base, flying to the European Theater transporting troops and equipment, then into the United States Central Command area of operations with volunteers.

The wing was later called to active duty in February 2003. At the peak of the 445th's activation, approximately 630 reservists from the wing were called to active duty. To date, the wing has over 100 reservists still on active duty status.

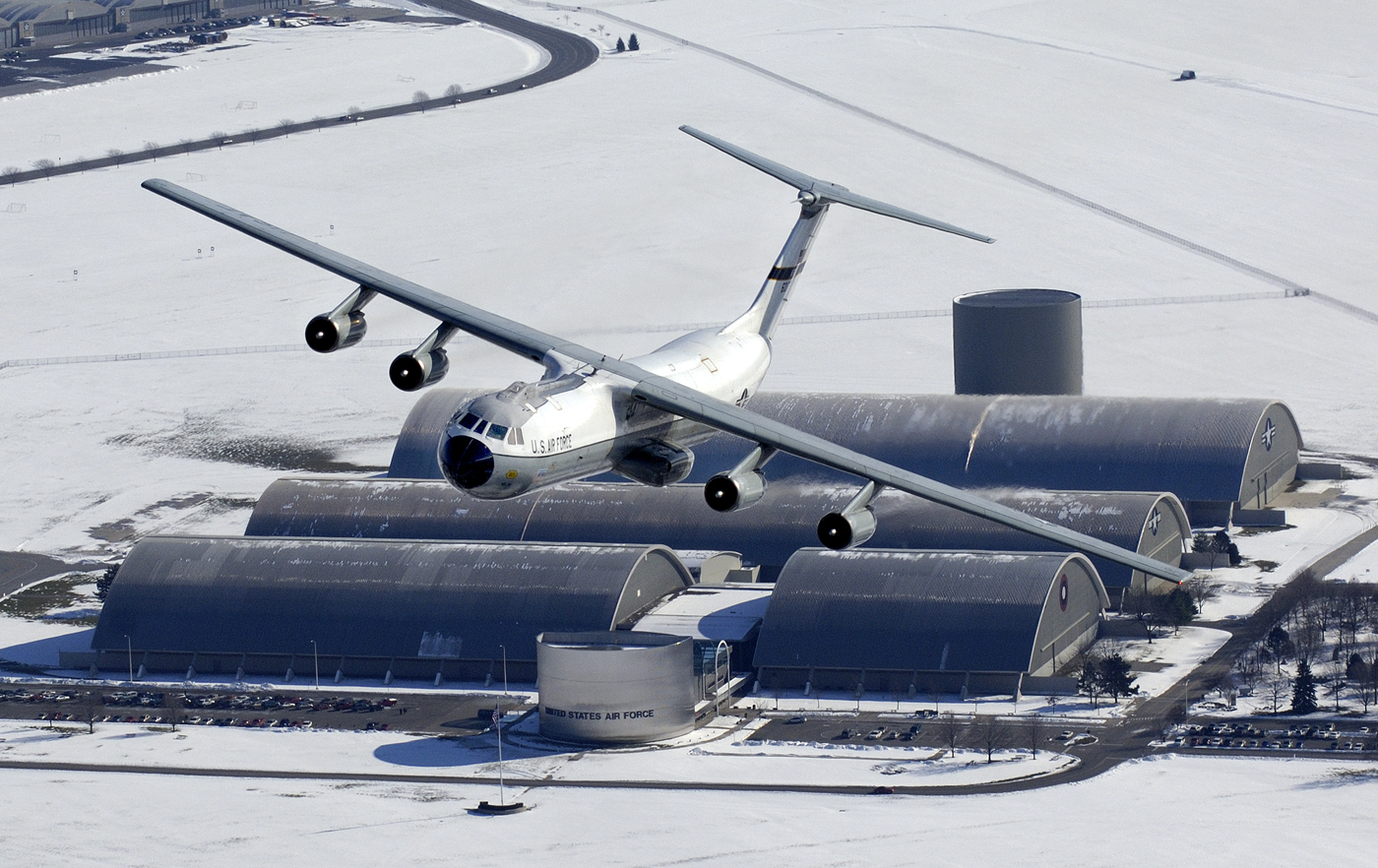
Hanoi Taxi flying over the National Museum of the United States Air Force in December 2005

Even though the staging point has stepped down for Operation Iraqi Freedom, the 445th operations tempo was still very high for the wing. Through 30 September 2005, flights continued to cycle from Wright-Patterson Air Force Base to Ramstein Air Base, Germany then into Balad Air Base, Iraq to transport wounded soldiers and Iraqi injured children who were severely sick or injured beyond hospital capabilities in Iraq, under the Coalition Provisional Authority. The injured were transported by a C-141 to Germany for medical treatment. After returning from Balad, then to Germany, the C-141 continued to the states while another C-141 took off from Wright-Patterson to continue the cycle. Most members of the 445th maintenance squadrons and flying squadrons are currently demobilized, but are keeping the C-141s in the air with volunteer tours of duty. The aeromedical crews from the aeromedical evacuation squadron continue to be mobilized.

The wing was the last unit in the U.S. Air Force to operate the C-141. One of these, the Hanoi Taxi (serial number 66-177), is famous for being the first aircraft to land in North Vietnam, in 1973, to repatriate American Prisoners of War at the end of the Vietnam War. On 6 May 2006, the Hanoi Taxi touched down for the last time and was received in a formal retirement ceremony at the National Museum of the United States Air Force, also at Wright-Patterson Air Force Base (at the southern airfield, as opposed to the northern airfield where the 445th operates).

On 3 October 2005, the 445th received its first of ten Lockheed C-5 Galaxy aircraft.

On 12 March 2010, the AFMC announced that the 445th will transition to the McDonnell Douglas C-17 Globemaster III aircraft over the next two years. The first C-17 arrived 24 January 2011 from Charleston Air Force Base. The wing's first Globemaster III arrived on 20 January 2011 and it flew its last Galaxy mission on 28 September 2011. The wing was fully equipped with the C-17 in February 2012.

== Lineage ==
- Established as the 445th Fighter-Bomber Wing on 24 June 1952

Activated in the reserve on 8 July 1952
Redesignated 445th Troop Carrier Wing, Medium on 6 September 1957
Redesignated 445th Troop Carrier Wing, Assault on 25 September 1958
Ordered to active service on 28 October 1962
Relieved from active service on 28 November 1962
Redesignated 445th Troop Carrier Wing, Heavy on 1 October 1965
Redesignated 445th Air Transport Wing, Heavy on 1 December 1965
Redesignated 445th Military Airlift Wing on 1 January 1966
Ordered to active service on 26 January 1968
Relieved from active service on 1 June 1969
Inactivated on 29 June 1971

- Redesignated 445th Military Airlift Wing (Associate) on 29 January 1973

Activated in the reserve on 1 July 1973
Redesignated 445th Airlift Wing (Associate) on 1 February 1992
Redesignated 445th Airlift Wing on 1 April 1993
Inactivated on 1 May 1994

- Activated on 1 October 1994

=== Assignments ===
- First Air Force, 8 July 1952
- Fourteenth Air Force, 16 November 1957
- Third Air Force Reserve Region, 15 July 1960
- Ninth Air Force, 28 October 1962
- Third Air Force Reserve Region, 28 November 1962
- Twenty-First Air Force, 26 January 1968
- Third Air Force Reserve Region, 2 June 1969
- Eastern Air Force Reserve Region, 31 December 1969 – 29 June 1971
- Western Air Force Reserve Region, 1 July 1973
- Fourth Air Force, 8 October 1976 – 1 May 1994
- Twenty-Second Air Force, 1 October 1994
- Fourth Air Force, 1 April 1997 – present

=== Components ===
Groups

- 445th Fighter-Bomber Group (later 445th Troop Carrier Group, 445th Operations Group): 8 July 1952 – 25 September 1958; 1 August 1992 – 1 May 1994; 1 October 1994–present
- 904th Military Airlift Group: 26 January 1968 – 1 June 1969
- 906th Fighter Group: 1 July 1982 – 1 October 1994
- 907th Tactical Airlift Group, 1 April 1993 – 1 October 1994
- 915th Air Transport Group (later 915th Military Airlift Group): 1 December 1965 – 26 January 1968; 1 September 1969 – 21 April 1971 (detached after 1 April 1971)
- 918th Troop Carrier Group (later 918th Air Transport Group, 918th Military Airlift Group): 11 February 1963 – 21 April 1971 (attached to 459th Military Airlift Wing after 1 April 1971)
- 919th Troop Carrier Group: 11 February 1963 – 15 December 1965
- 920th Troop Carrier Group: 11 February 1963 – 15 December 1965
- 943d Airlift Group: 1 February 1992 – 30 June 1993

Squadrons

- 76th Troop Carrier Squadron: 1 October 1961 – 27 August 1962
- 336th Military Airlift Squadron: attached 15 August 1968 – 1 June 1969
- 700th Troop Carrier Squadron (later 700th Military Airlift Squadron): attached 16 November 1957 – 24 September 1958, assigned 25 September 1958 – 11 February 1963; attached 15 August 1968 – 1 June 1969
- 701st Troop Carrier Squadron: 25 September 1958 – 11 February 1963 (detached)
- 702d Troop Carrier Squadron: 25 September 1958 – 11 February 1963 (detached)
- 728th Military Airlift Squadron: 1 July 1973 – 1 January 1992
- 729th Military Airlift Squadron: 1 July 1973 – 1 August 1992
- 730th Military Airlift Squadron: 1 July 1973 – 1 August 1992

=== Stations ===
- Buffalo, New York, 8 July 1952
- Niagara Falls Municipal Airport, New York, 15 June 1955
- Dobbins Air Force Base, Georgia, 6 September 1957 – 29 June 1971
- Norton Air Force Base, California, 1 July 1973 - 29 March 1994
- March Air Force Base, California, 30 March 1994 – 1 May 1994
- Wright-Patterson Air Force Base, Ohio, 1 October 1994 – present

=== Aircraft ===
- North American T-6 Texan, 1952–1955
- North American F-51 Mustang, 1953–1954
- Lockheed F-80 Shooting Star, 1953–1956
- Republic F-84 Thunderjet, 1955–1957
- Fairchild C-119 Flying Boxcar, 1957, 1957–1959, 1961–1962, 1965–1966
- Fairchild C-123 Provider, 1958–1965
- Douglas C-124 Globemaster II, 1965–1971
- Lockheed C-141 Starlifter, 1973–1994
- Lockheed C-130 Hercules, 1992–1993
- Lockheed C-141 Starlifter, 1994–2005
- Lockheed C-5 Galaxy 2005–2012
- Boeing C-17 Globemaster III, 2010–present
