= Kassel Mission =

1944 Allied aerial offensive during WWII

The Kassel Mission on 27 September 1944 was also known as the air battle over the Seulingswald. The mission aimed to destroy the factories in Kassel of the engineering works of Henschel & Sohn which built tracked armoured vehicles (the "Tiger" and "Panther" tanks) and their associated infrastructure. See bombing of Kassel in World War II.

== Main battle ==
For this mission the 8th Air Force dispatched 283 B-24 Liberator bombers of the 2nd Combat Bombardment Wing and, as escorts, 198 P-51 Mustang fighters.

As the result of a navigation error, the lead ship of the 445th Bombardment Group turned almost due east instead of east-southeast and its 35 bombers bypassed Kassel, deciding instead to bomb the railway facilities in the town of Göttingen. The bombs, however, missed the marshalling yard and the repair shop. Instead, 25 buildings in the village of Rosdorf, on the southwest edge of Göttingen, were damaged and three people injured. The villagers there counted a total of 103 bomb craters. As a result of the change of course, the bombers became separated from their fighter escort on the return flight. Around 11:00 am they turned west over the Seulingswald forest between Bad Hersfeld and Eisenach and were almost immediately attacked by 150 fighters of the German Jagdgeschwader (fighter wings) 3 (Udet), 4 and 300. These wings were equipped with Bf 109 and Fw 190 fighters which had been modified with extra armour and 20 and 30 mm cannon for attacking bomber formations. The air battle only lasted for a few minutes "but it was a horrendous attack;" 25 bombers were shot down across an area 15 miles (24 km) across and went down over the Seulingswald. The total destruction of the formation was avoided by the late arrival of the 361st Fighter Group. In addition, six additional bombers crashed on the return flight to their home base at Tibenham, Norfolk, England; only four bombers made it home unscathed. This was the greatest single-mission loss of aircraft from any American bombardment group during World War II.

American losses were 31 B-24 Liberator bombers and one P-51 Mustang shot down. 118 Americans were killed, of whom 11 were murdered after parachuting to safety. 121 Americans ended up in German POW camps and survived.

German losses came to 29 fighters shot down, with 18 pilots killed. In addition, seven people died when a German fighter crashed on a German medical base

This air battle was one of the largest late-war confrontations between the United States Army Air Forces (USAAF) and the Luftwaffe, the latter of which was barely still active at this time.

== Follow-up operations ==
In the days after the battle, USAAF aircraft dropped leaflets over the suspected landing zones to try and protect crews that had parachuted to safety from being lynched. Near the town limits of Bad Hersfeld carpet bombing was carried out to create fear of the American air force.

== Memorial site ==
On 1 August 1990, an airmen's memorial was unveiled at the crash site of the lead ship of the US bomber group in the Seulingswald near Ludwigsau-Friedlos to commemorate the fallen and as a gesture of reconciliation.
