= B-24 Liberator units of the United States Army Air Forces =

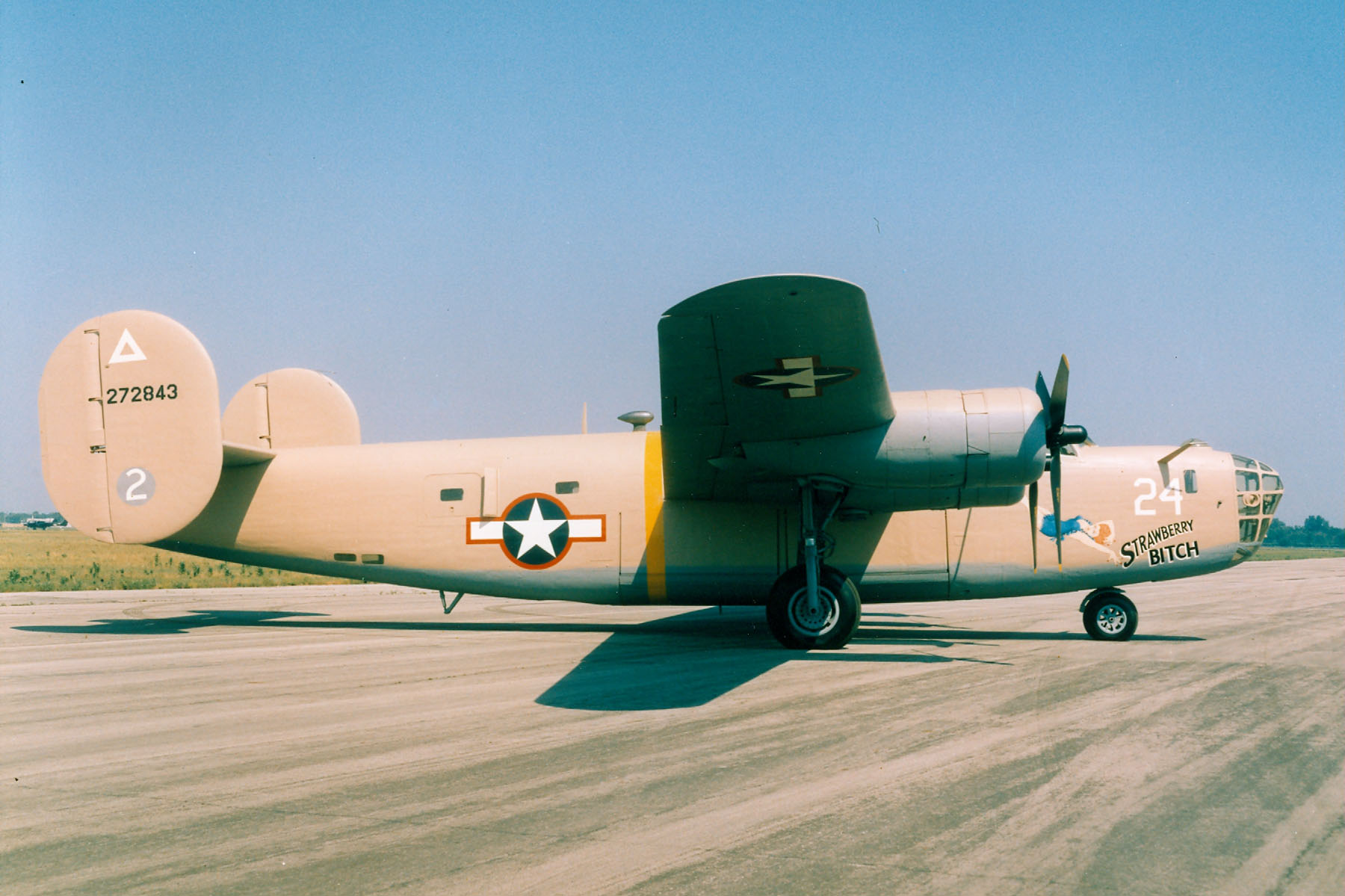
Consolidated B-24D-160-CO Liberator 42-72815 "Strawberry Bitch" on display at the National Museum of the United States Air Force. The B-24D on display flew combat missions from North Africa in 1943–1944, and was eventually sent to storage after the war to Davis-Monthan Field, Arizona. In 1959 the aircraft was taken out of storage and flown to the museum for restoration and display. It was the last B-24 flight made by the USAF.

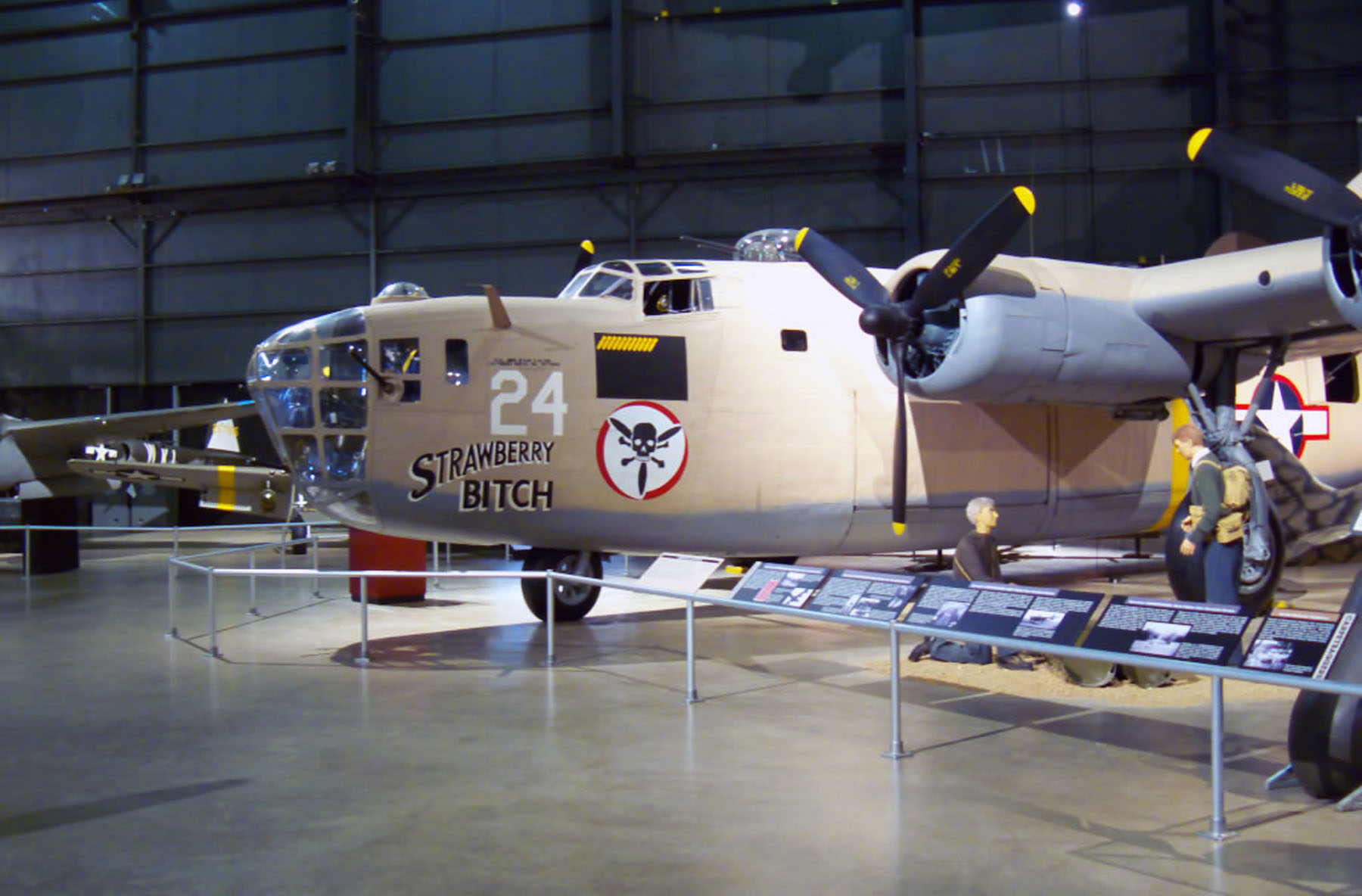
Indoor display of above aircraft. Aircraft markings are of the Ninth Air Force 512th Bombardment Squadron, 376th Bombardment Group, to which it was originally assigned in September 1943.

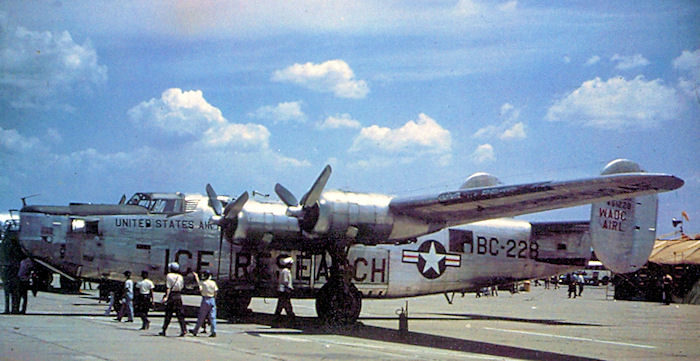
The last active USAF B-24, 44-51228 in 1952, just prior to its retirement

During World War II, the United States Army Air Forces took delivery of its first Consolidated Liberator B-24As in June 1941, although the B-24D was the first production model delivered in quantity in July 1942. B-24s were assigned to every combat Air Force; at peak inventory, the USAAF had 6,043 B-24 Liberators operating worldwide in September 1944.

After the war ended, the Liberator was rapidly withdrawn from USAAF service, being replaced by the Boeing B-29 Superfortress. Literally thousands of Liberators were flown to various disposal units where they were cut up for scrap. Some brand-new late-production B-24Ms from Convair/San Diego and Ford/Willow Run were flown directly from the factory to various reclamation sites such as the scrapyard at RFC Kingman, Arizona in 1945, as the war in Europe had ended and B-29s were doing most of the long-range bombing work in the Pacific.

Only a few Liberators were still around when the United States Air Force was formed in 1947, most of them being used for various research purposes. The last USAF Liberator, a Ford EZB-24M-20-FO serial number 44-51228 used by the Aeronautical Icing Research Laboratory for ice research, was struck off the rolls in 1953. For a time, it was on display at Lackland AFB, Texas, with the armament and gunner positions restored. It is currently at the American Museum at Duxford Aerodrome, England painted as 44-50492, a B-24M that was assigned to the 392d Bombardment Group, 578th Bombardment Squadron.

World War II units and formations are documented here, including variants and other historical information. Heavy bomber training organizations primarily under II Bomber Command in the United States and non-combat units are not included.

== Combat organizations ==
=== Army Air Forces Antisubmarine Command ===
The Army Air Forces Antisubmarine Command was established in October 1942 to deal with the U-boat threat; formed largely from the resources of I Bomber Command. It was inactivated in August 1943 when antisubmarine mission was taken over by the United States Navy.

- 1st Search Attack Group

October 1942–August 1943; Langley Field, Virginia
2d Search Attack Squadron
3d Search Attack Squadron
4th Search Attack Squadron
Became radar training unit for USAAF, inactivated April 1944

- 304th Bombardment Group

October–December 1942Langley Field, Virginia Its Bombardment Squadrons were redesignated as Antisubmarine Squadrons serving in the USA with the 25th & 26 th Wings. The 19th ARON went to the UK when the 479th AG was activated
1st Antisubmarine Squadron
18th Antisubmarine Squadron
19th Antisubmarine Squadron

- 26th Antisubmarine Wing

November 1942–October 1943; Miami Airport, Florida
15th Antisubmarine Squadron

Plus many more.

Inactivated October 1943

- 479th Antisubmarine Group

July–November 1943; England (Several stations)
4th Antisubmarine Squadron
6th Antisubmarine Squadron
19th Antisubmarine Squadron
22d Antisubmarine Squadron
Inactivated November 1943; Aircraft VIIIAFSC. Some returned to US and transferred to Pacific and CBI. Others to CB-24/C-87. Still others to 8th AF special operations.

- 480th Antisubmarine Group

June–November 1943; Port Lyautey, Morocco
1st Antisubmarine Squadron
2d Antisubmarine Squadron
Inactivated 1943. Inventory returned to USA.

FOOTNOTE: Seventy-seven domestic Antisubmarine B-24Ds were transferred to the USN as PB4Y-1 in exchange for future allocations.

=== Fifth Air Force ===
Originally formed as the Philippine Department Air Force in August 1941; Stationed in the Southwest Pacific Area (SWPA) of the Asiatic-Pacific Theater Operating in the Far East, Australia, New Guinea and Philippines. Participated in halting the Japanese drive in Papua, recovery of New Guinea, liberation of the Philippines and the Battle of Okinawa and Formosa.

- 22nd Bombardment Group

Transitioned from B-25/B-26 to B-24s at Nadzab, New Guinea in February 1944
Operated from Netherlands East Indies, Philippines, Okinawa
2d Bombardment Squadron
19th Bombardment Squadron
33d Bombardment Squadron
408th Bombardment Squadron
Re-equipped with B-29s, May 1946 on Okinawa

- 43d Bombardment Group

Equipped with B-17s in 1941; Deployed to Australia March 1942
Transitioned to B-24s at Port Moresby, New Guinea between May and September 1943.
Operated from Netherlands East Indies, Philippines, Okinawa
63d Bombardment Squadron
64th Bombardment Squadron
65th Bombardment Squadron
403d Bombardment Squadron

The 63rd BS specialized in sea search and attack.

Inactivated 1946

- 90th Bombardment Group

Activated with B-24s in April 1942, Deployed to Australia in November 1942
Operated from Australia, Netherlands East Indies, Philippines, Okinawa
319th Bombardment Squadron
320th Bombardment Squadron
321st Bombardment Squadron
400th Bombardment Squadron
Inactivated 1946

- 380th Bombardment Group

Activated with B-24s in November 1942; Deployed to Australia
Attached to RAAF until January 1944, then Philippines, Okinawa
528th Bombardment Squadron
529th Bombardment Squadron
530th Bombardment Squadron
531st Bombardment Squadron
Inactivated 1946

- 20th Combat Mapping Squadron

Activated with F-7As in October 1943 (later flew F-7B/F-7B H2X)
Operated from Australia, Netherlands East Indies, Philippines, Okinawa, Occupied Japan
Inactivated 1946

=== Sixth Air Force ===
Sixth Air Force begin in February 1917, formally established as Panama Canal Air Force in October 1940. Control of USAAF operations in the Caribbean. Primarily flew antisubmarine patrols over both the Caribbean and Eastern Pacific Ocean approaches to the Panama Canal.

- 6th Bombardment Group

Received LB-30s (March 1942) and B-24Ds (September 1942)
3d Bombardment Squadron
25th Bombardment Squadron
29th Bombardment Squadron
74th Bombardment Squadron
395th Bombardment Squadron
397th Bombardment Squadron
6th BG reassigned to United States in November 1943; B-24s remained with various 6th AF squadrons under VI Bomber Command until 1946

=== Seventh Air Force ===
Initially formed as the Hawaiian Air Force in October 1940. Operated primarily in Central Pacific Area (CPA) of the Pacific Ocean Areas under USN control until July, 1945 when assigned to FEAF.

- 11th Bombardment Group

Transitioned from B-17s to B-24s at Hickam Field, Hawaii Territory in April 1943.
Operated in Gilbert Islands, Marshall Islands, Northern Marianas Islands, Okinawa
26th Bombardment Squadron
42d Bombardment Squadron
98th Bombardment Squadron
431st Bombardment Squadron
Inactivated 1945

- 30th Bombardment Group

Received LB-30s in 1941, B-24s in 1942 at March Field, California Moved to Pacific, 1943.
Operated in Gilbert Islands, Marshall Islands, Northern Marianas Islands
27th Bombardment Squadron
38th Bombardment Squadron
392d Bombardment Squadron
819th Bombardment Squadron
Inactivated 1946

- 494th Bombardment Group

Activated with B-24J in December 1943
Operated in Palau Islands, Okinawa
864th Bombardment Squadron
865th Bombardment Squadron
866th Bombardment Squadron
867th Bombardment Squadron

373 BS attached, July 1945 to provide sea search capabilities to VII BC, FEAF.

Inactivated 1945

- 86th Combat Mapping Squadron

Received F-7A/Bs at Wheeler Field, Hawaii Territory, early 1944
Operated from Kwajalein, Saipan, Eniwetok, Palawan
Inactivated 1946

=== Eighth Air Force ===
Eighth Air Force was the primary heavy bombardment Air Force in the European Theater of Operations (ETO) during World War II, stationed in England. Its mission was conducting long-range strategic bomber offensive against Occupied Europe and Nazi Germany. The first Liberator mission from England took place on 9 October 1942. Several VIII Bomber Command Liberator groups deployed aircraft to Libya in late 1942 and 1943 to augment IX Bomber Command and carry out attacks against Axis targets in the Mediterranean. Ultimately a total of twenty-one Liberator-equipped groups were deployed and operated with the Eighth Air Force 2d and 3d Bombardment Divisions.

- 34th Bombardment Group

RAF Mendlesham, April 1944-July 1945
4th Bombardment Squadron
7th Bombardment Squadron
18th Bombardment Squadron
391st Bombardment Squadron
Converted to B-17s, September 1944

- 44th Bombardment Group

RAF Shipdham, October 1942-June 1945
Deployed to Ninth Air Force, June–August 1943
Participated in 1 August 1943 attack on Ploesti oilfields in Romania
66th Bombardment Squadron
67th Bombardment Squadron
68th Bombardment Squadron
404th Bombardment Squadron
Converted to B-29s

- 93d Bombardment Group

RAF Hardwick, December 1942-May 1945
Deployed to Ninth Air Force, December 1942-August 1943
Participated in 1 August 1943 attack on Ploesti oilfields in Romania
328th Bombardment Squadron
329th Bombardment Squadron
330th Bombardment Squadron
409th Bombardment Squadron
Inactivated December 1945

- 389th Bombardment Group

RAF Hethel, June 1943–May 1945
Deployed to Ninth Air Force, July–August 1943
Participated in 1 August 1943 attack on Ploesti oilfields in Romania
564th Bombardment Squadron
565th Bombardment Squadron
566th Bombardment Squadron
567th Bombardment Squadron
Inactivated September 1945

- 392d Bombardment Group

RAF Wendling, July 1943–June 1945
576th Bombardment Squadron
577th Bombardment Squadron
578th Bombardment Squadron
579th Bombardment Squadron
Inactivated September 1945

- 445th Bombardment Group

RAF Tibenham, November 1943-May 1945
700th Bombardment Squadron
701st Bombardment Squadron
702d Bombardment Squadron
703d Bombardment Squadron
Inactivated September 1945

- 446th Bombardment Group

RAF Bungay, November 1943-July 1945
704th Bombardment Squadron
705th Bombardment Squadron
706th Bombardment Squadron
707th Bombardment Squadron
Inactivated August 1945

- 447th Bombardment Group

RAF Attlebridge, March 1944-July 1945
708th Bombardment Squadron
709th Bombardment Squadron
710th Bombardment Squadron
711th Bombardment Squadron
Converted to B-17s, Summer 1944

- 448th Bombardment Group

RAF Seething, December 1943-July 1945
712th Bombardment Squadron
713th Bombardment Squadron
714th Bombardment Squadron
715th Bombardment Squadron
Converted to B-29s

- 453d Bombardment Group

RAF Old Buckenham, December 1943-May 1945
732d Bombardment Squadron
733d Bombardment Squadron
734th Bombardment Squadron
735th Bombardment Squadron
Inactivated August 1945

- 458th Bombardment Group

RAF Horsham St. Faith, January 1944-June 1945
752d Bombardment Squadron
753d Bombardment Squadron
754th Bombardment Squadron
755th Bombardment Squadron
Converted to B-29s

- 466th Bombardment Group

RAF Attlebridge, March 1944-July 1945
784th Bombardment Squadron
785th Bombardment Squadron
786th Bombardment Squadron
787th Bombardment Squadron
Inactivated July 1945

- 467th Bombardment Group

RAF Rackheath, March 1944-June 1945
788th Bombardment Squadron
789th Bombardment Squadron
790th Bombardment Squadron
791st Bombardment Squadron
Converted to B-29s

- 482d Bombardment Group (Pathfinder)

RAF Alconbury, August 1943-May 1945
Attached to: VIII Composite Command, February 1944-January 1945
Composite group with 2 squadrons of B-17s and one of B-24s
Conducted Pathfinder missions using H2X radar
812th Bombardment Squadron (B-17)
813th Bombardment Squadron (B-17)
814th Bombardment Squadron (B-24)
Inactivated September 1945

- 486th Bombardment Group

RAF Sudbury, April–November 1944
832d Bombardment Squadron
833d Bombardment Squadron
834th Bombardment Squadron
835th Bombardment Squadron
Converted to B-17s, August 1944

- 487th Bombardment Group

RAF Lavenham, April 1944–February 1945
836th Bombardment Squadron
837th Bombardment Squadron
838th Bombardment Squadron
839th Bombardment Squadron
Converted to B-17s, July 1944

- 489th Bombardment Group

RAF Halesworth, May–November 1944
844th Bombardment Squadron
845th Bombardment Squadron
846th Bombardment Squadron
847th Bombardment Squadron
Converted to B-29s, December 1944

- 490th Bombardment Group

RAF Eye, May 1944-October 1944
848th Bombardment Squadron
849th Bombardment Squadron
850th Bombardment Squadron
851st Bombardment Squadron
Converted to B-17s, August 1944

- 491st Bombardment Group

RAF Metfield, RAF North Pickenham, April 1944-July 1945
852d Bombardment Squadron
853d Bombardment Squadron
854th Bombardment Squadron
855th Bombardment Squadron
Inactivated September 1945

- 492d Bombardment Group

Unit deployed to RAF North Pickenham, January 1944. Re-designation of 801st Bombardment Group (Provisional), August 1944. Unit at RAF Harrington until August 1945.
856th Bombardment Squadron
857th Bombardment Squadron
858th Bombardment Squadron
859th Bombardment Squadron
Converted to B-29s, August 1945

- 493d Bombardment Group

RAF Debach, RAF Wormingford, April 1944-August 1945
860th Bombardment Squadron
861st Bombardment Squadron
862d Bombardment Squadron
863d Bombardment Squadron
Converted to B-17s, May 1944

=== Ninth Air Force ===
IX Bomber Command operated Liberators from airfields in Egypt; Libya and Tunisia during the Western Desert Campaign (1942–1943). Transferred B-24s to Twelfth Air Force in October 1943; reassigned to England to become tactical air force supporting American First Army (IX Tactical Air Command), Third Army (XIX Tactical Air Command), and Ninth Army (XXIX Tactical Air Command).

- 98th Bombardment Group

Deployed to Middle East July 1942, First B-24Ds to be deployed overseas (Halverson Detachment)
Stationed in BritishPalestine, Egypt, Libya, Tunisia
Participated in 1 August 1943 Attack on Ploesti Oilfields, Romania
343d Bombardment Squadron
344th Bombardment Squadron
345th Bombardment Squadron
415th Bombardment Squadron
Transferred to Twelfth (October), then Fifteenth Air Force, November 1943

- 376th Bombardment Group

Deployed to Middle East October 1942
Stationed in BritishPalestine, Egypt, Libya, Tunisia
Participated in 1 August 1943 Attack on Ploesti Oilfields, Romania
512th Bombardment Squadron
513th Bombardment Squadron
514th Bombardment Squadron
515th Bombardment Squadron
Transferred to Twelfth (October), then Fifteenth Air Force, November 1943

=== Tenth Air Force ===
Tenth Air Force was constituted February 1942. Moved to India March–May 1942. Primary USAAF Air Force in the China-Burma-India theater.

- 7th Bombardment Group

Formed September 1918; deployed to Philippines September 1940; withdrawn to Australia late December 1941; combat in Java Jan-March 1942; deployed to India. Transitioned from B-17C/Ds to B-24s at Karachi, March 1942
9th Bombardment Squadron
436th Bombardment Squadron
492d Bombardment Squadron
493d Bombardment Squadron
Inactivated December 1945

=== Eleventh Air Force ===
Eleventh Air Force was formed February 1942. Based in Alaska Territory. Engaged in combat using B-24s during Aleutian Campaign (1942–1943). First B-24 raid on Japanese Home Islands in 1943.

- 28th Composite Group

Received LB-30s and B-24s at Elmendorf Field, Alaska, 1942
21st Bombardment Squadron
36th Bombardment Squadron
404th Bombardment Squadron
Inactivated October 1945

=== Twelfth Air Force ===
Twelfth Air Force was formed November 1942. Operated B-24s in Algeria, Tunisia and Sicily. Transferred Liberators to Fifteenth Air Force in November 1943, becoming tactical air force in Mediterranean Theater of Operations (MTO) primarily supporting Fifth Army (XII Tactical Air Command) in Italy, also operating in Southern France and Germany supporting Seventh Army.

Twelfth Air Force had several B-17 Flying Fortress groups which were transferred from VIII Bomber Command in England when the command was formed in the fall of 1942. In Tunisia, the Liberator-equipped 98th and 376th Bombardment Groups were briefly transferred from Ninth Air Force in October 1943 to the command. All of Twelfth AF's heavy bomb groups were reassigned to Fifteenth Air Force in November.

=== Thirteenth Air Force ===
Thirteenth Air Force was formed on 14 December 1942. Operated primarily in South Pacific Area (SPA) of the Pacific Theater of Operations (PTO)

- 5th Bombardment Group

Unit formed in 1915. Large number of B-18s and B-17C/Ds destroyed during Pearl Harbor Attack; surviving B-17s sent to New Hebrides in 1942. Re-equipped in Hawaii with B-24s and redeployed in August 1943
Stationed in Solomon Islands, Admiralty Islands, Netherlands East Indies, Schouten Islands, Molucca Islands, Philippines
23d Bombardment Squadron
31st Bombardment Squadron
72d Bombardment Squadron
394th Bombardment Squadron
Transitioned to RB-29s in 1946

- 307th Bombardment Group

Established with B-17s in April 1942; transitioned to B-24s at Hickam Field, November 1942
Stationed in Solomon Islands, Admiralty Islands, Netherlands East Indies, Philippines
370th Bombardment Squadron
371st Bombardment Squadron
372d Bombardment Squadron
424th Bombardment Squadron
Transitioned to B-29s in 1946

- 868th Bombardment Squadron

Established in July 1943 with SB-24 RADAR aircraft; assigned directly to 13th AF Headquarters. Flew low level, anti-shipping strikes under the cover of darkness. Also flew as pathfinders for high-altitude bombers. Special missions were flown against land targets at night and one of the intentions was to prevent the Japanese from sleeping. Stationed in Solomon Islands, Admiralty Islands, Schouten Islands, Netherlands East Indies, Philippines, Okinawa. Inactivated December 1945

=== Fourteenth Air Force ===
Fourteenth Air Force was formed out of the American Volunteer Group in March 1943 in Kunming, China. Primary United States Air Force in China as part of the China-Burma-India Theater

- 308th Bombardment Group

Formed with B-24s in April 1942; deployed to China in March 1943
373d Bombardment Squadron
374th Bombardment Squadron
375th Bombardment Squadron
425th Bombardment Squadron
Inactivated October 1945

=== Fifteenth Air Force ===
Fifteenth Air Force was activated in Tunisia on 1 November 1943. Primary strategic bombardment Air Force of the Mediterranean Theater of Operations (MTO) operating from airfields in Southern Italy. Had 15 B-24 groups. Bombing raids against targets in Italy, then took part in raids on Germany, Austria, Hungary, Yugoslavia, and Romania. Supported the invasion of southern France.

- 449th Bombardment Group

Grottaglie Airfield, January 1944-May 1945
716th Bombardment Squadron
717th Bombardment Squadron
718th Bombardment Squadron
719th Bombardment Squadron
Transitioned to B-29s, May 1945

- 450th Bombardment Group

Manduria Airfield, December 1943-May 1945
720th Bombardment Squadron
721st Bombardment Squadron
722d Bombardment Squadron
723d Bombardment Squadron
Transitioned to B-29s, May 1945

- 451st Bombardment Group

Gioia del Colle Airfield, January 1944; San Pancrazio Airfield, March 1944; Castelltuccio Airfield, April 1944-June 1945
724th Bombardment Squadron
725th Bombardment Squadron
726th Bombardment Squadron
727th Bombardment Squadron
Inactivated September 1945

- 454th Bombardment Group

San Giovanni Airfield, January 1944-July 1945
736th Bombardment Squadron
737th Bombardment Squadron
738th Bombardment Squadron
739th Bombardment Squadron
Transitioned to B-29s, August 1945

- 455th Bombardment Group

San Giovanni Airfield, January 1944-September 1945
740th Bombardment Squadron
741st Bombardment Squadron
742d Bombardment Squadron
743d Bombardment Squadron
Inactivated September 1945

- 456th Bombardment Group

Stornara Airfield, January 1944-July 1945
744th Bombardment Squadron
745th Bombardment Squadron
746th Bombardment Squadron
747th Bombardment Squadron
Transitioned to B-29s, August 1945

- 459th Bombardment Group

Giulia Airfield, February 1944-July 1945
756th Bombardment Squadron
757th Bombardment Squadron
758th Bombardment Squadron
759th Bombardment Squadron
Inactivated August 1945

- 460th Bombardment Group

Spinazzola Airfield, February 1944-June 1945
760th Bombardment Squadron
761st Bombardment Squadron
762d Bombardment Squadron
763d Bombardment Squadron
Transferred to Air Transport Command for Green Project transport of troops from Europe to United States, June 1945
Inactivated July 1945

- 461st Bombardment Group

Torretto Airfield, February 1944-July 1945
764th Bombardment Squadron
765th Bombardment Squadron
766th Bombardment Squadron
767th Bombardment Squadron
Inactivated August 1945

- 464th Bombardment Group

Pantanella Airfield, March 1944-May 1945
776th Bombardment Squadron
777th Bombardment Squadron
778th Bombardment Squadron
779th Bombardment Squadron
Transferred to Air Transport Command for Green Project transport of troops from Europe to United States, May 1945
Inactivated July 1945

- 465th Bombardment Group

Pantanella Airfield, April 1944-June 1945
780th Bombardment Squadron
781st Bombardment Squadron
782d Bombardment Squadron
783d Bombardment Squadron
Transferred to Air Transport Command for Green Project transport of troops from Europe to United States, June 1945
Inactivated July 1945

- 484th Bombardment Group

Torretto Airfield, April 1944-May 1945
824th Bombardment Squadron
825th Bombardment Squadron
826th Bombardment Squadron
827th Bombardment Squadron
Transferred to Air Transport Command for Green Project transport of troops from Europe to United States, May 1945
Inactivated July 1945

- 485th Bombardment Group

Venosa Airfield, April 1944-May 1945
828th Bombardment Squadron
829th Bombardment Squadron
830th Bombardment Squadron
831st Bombardment Squadron
Transitioned to B-29s, August 1945

- 98th Bombardment Group; 376th Bombardment Group

Previously served with both the Ninth and Twelfth Air Forces before being assigned to the Fifteenth Air Force in November 1943. Stationed in Tunisia and later Southern Italy. Inactivated November 1945.

- 2641st Special Group (Provisional)

Assigned directly to 15th AF Headquarters. Flew B-17s, B-24s and other aircraft types as needed. Engaged in special operations in the Mediterranean Theater of Operations, December 1944-May 1945
859th Bombardment Squadron
885th Bombardment Squadron

=== Twentieth Air Force ===
Twentieth Air Force was constituted April 1944. Primarily equipped with Boeing B-29 Superfortresses but there were two reconnaissance squadrons equipped with B-24s and F-7s that were stationed on the Northern Mariana Islands. Both units reported to XXI Bomber Command Headquarters.

- 3d Reconnaissance Squadron

Active September 1944-September 1945.
Flew photographic, electronic, and weather reconnaissance missions in Western Pacific

- 55th Weather Reconnaissance Squadron

Activated as 655th Reconnaissance Squadron, January 1945; redesignated June 1945.
Flew weather reconnaissance flights for XXI Bomber Command headquarters target and route planning for bombardment missions. Inactivated April 1946.

== See also ==
- List of B-24 Liberator operators
