= 734th Bombardment Squadron =

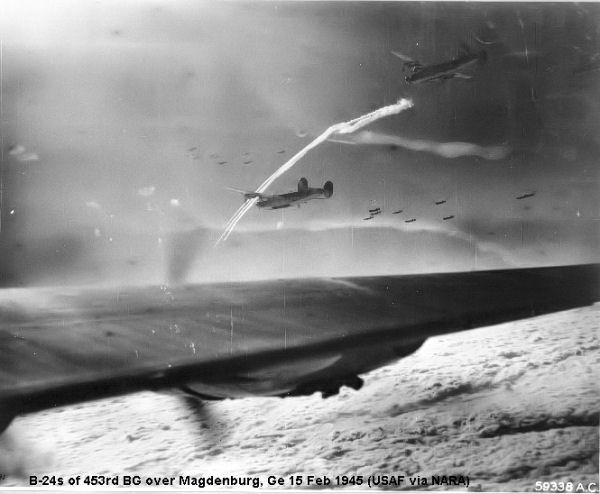
- Consolidated B-24 Liberators of the 453d Bombardment Group on a mission over Magdeburg
- Active: 1943-1945
- Country: United States
- Branch: United States Air Force
- Role: Heavy bomber
- Engagements: European Theater of World War II

Insignia
- World War II fuselage code: E8

The 734th Bombardment Squadron is a former United States Army Air Forces unit. It was assigned to the 453d Bombardment Group and last stationed at Fort Dix Army Air Base, New Jersey, where it was inactivated on 12 September 1945. The squadron was first activated in May 1943. After training in the United States with the Consolidated B-24 Liberator, the squadron deployed to the European Theater of Operations, participating in the strategic bombing campaign against Germany. Following V-E Day, the squadron returned to the United States for conversion as a very heavy bomber unit, but inactivated instead.

== History ==
=== Training in the United States ===
The 734th Bombardment Squadron was activated at Wendover Field, Utah as one of the four squadrons of the 453d Bombardment Group. It moved to Pocatello Army Air Field, Idaho, where it was brought up to strength and trained with Consolidated B-24 Liberators, completing its training at March Field, California in December and departing for the European Theater of Operations, with the ground echelon departing on 2 December.

=== Combat in the European Theater ===
The ground echelon arrived at the squadron's combat station, RAF Old Buckenham on 23 December 1943, where the squadron was fully established with the arrival of the air echelon by January 1944. The squadron flew its first mission against an airfield at Tours on 4 February 1944. The squadron participated primarily in the strategic bombing campaign against Germany. Toward the end of February, the squadron participated in Big Week, the concentrated attack on the German aircraft manufacturing industry. Other targets in Germany included a rail viaduct at Altenbeken, a fuel storage facility at Dulmen, oil refineries at Gelsenkirchen, an ordnance depot at Glinde, an aircraft assembly plant at Gotha, a rail center at Hamm, a chemical factory at Leverkusen, a commercial canal at Minden, an airfield at Neumunster and marshalling yards at Paderborn.

In addition to its strategic missions, the squadron also engaged in air support and interdiction missions. It bombed V-1 flying bomb and V-2 rocket launch sites, airfields and coastal defense guns to prepare for Operation Overlord, the invasion of Normandy. On D-Day, it struck coastal fortifications between Le Havre and Cherbourg Harbour and enemy positions inland from the landing area. It made attacks on enemy troops to support Operation Cobra, the breakout at Saint Lo in July 1944. It bombed German lines of communication during the Battle of the Bulge in December 1944 and January 1945.

On two occasions, the squadron carried out airlift missions. In September 1944, it flew rations, gasoline and blankets to advancing troops in France. During Operation Varsity, the airborne assault across the Rhine near Wesel, it dropped medical supplies, food and ammunition to troops at the bridgehead. The squadron flew its last mission on 12 April 1945, and was withdrawn from combat to prepare for possible redeployment to the Pacific.

The squadron's personnel departed Old Buckenham for the port of embarkation on 9 May 1945, apparently leaving their aircraft behind. The squadron assembled at New Castle Army Air Base, Delaware in late May, but soon moved to Fort Dix Army Air Base, New Jersey. Initial plans were to convert the unit to a very heavy bomber squadron for combat in the Pacific, but the Japanese surrender changed those plans and the unit was inactivated on 12 September.

== Lineage ==
- Constituted as the 734th Bombardment Squadron (Heavy) on 14 May 1943

Activated on 1 June 1943
Redesignated 734th Bombardment Squadron, Heavy in 1944
Inactivated on 12 September 1945

=== Assignments ===
- 453d Bombardment Group, 1 June 1943 – 12 September 1945

=== Stations ===
- Wendover Field, Utah, 1 June 1943
- Pocatello Army Air Field, Idaho, 29 July 1943
- March Field, California, c. 29 September–2 December 1943
- RAF Old Buckenham (AAF-114), England, 23 December 1943 - 9 May 1945
- New Castle Army Air Base, Delaware, 25 May 1945
- Fort Dix Army Air Base, New Jersey, 18 June 1945 - 12 September 1945

=== Aircraft ===
- Consolidated B-24 Liberator, 1943–1945

Campaign Streamer	Campaign	Dates	Notes
	Air Offensive, Europe	29 December 1943 – 5 June 1944	
	Normandy	6 June 1944 – 24 July 1944	
	Northern France	25 July 1944 – 14 September 1944	
	Rhineland	`5 September 1944 – 21 March 1945	
	Ardennes-Alsace	16 December 1944 – 25 January 1945	
	Central Europe	22 March 1944 – 21 May 1945	

== See also ==
- B-24 Liberator units of the United States Army Air Forces
