= Old Buckenham Airfield =

Airfield in Norfolk, England

- 453rd Shield carved during WWII and used as the Airfield's logo since 2013
- IATA: none; ICAO: EGSV

Summary
- Airport type: Private
- Owner: Geoffrey Lynch OBE
- Operator: Buckenham Aviation Centre Limited
- Location: Old Buckenham, Norfolk, England
- Opened: 1943
- Elevation AMSL: 195 ft / 59 m
- Coordinates: 52°29′51″N 001°03′07″E
- Website: www.oldbuck.com

Map
- Location in Norfolk

Runways
| Direction | Length | | Surface |
| Direction | m | ft | Surface |
|---|---|---|---|
| 07/25 | 798 | 2,618 | Asphalt |
| 07L/25R | 407 | 1,335 | Grass |
| 02/20 | 428 | 1,404 | Grass |
- Sources: NATS eAIS (2026), NATS AIP (2014)

Old Buckenham Airfield (ICAO: EGSV), formerly RAF Old Buckenham, is located 14 miles (23 km) southwest of Norwich in Norfolk, England.

Old Buckenham Aerodrome has a CAA Ordinary Licence (Number P907) that allows flights for the public transport of passengers or for flying instruction as authorised by the licensee (Buckenham Aviation Centre Limited). The aerodrome is not licensed for night use.

== History ==
The airfield was under Air Ministry control as a satellite for maintenance units until it was closed on 20 June 1960. After a period of uncertainty about the airfield's future, it was announced on 23 August 2011 by the Eastern Daily Press that the airfield was under new management. In previous years the then operating company had reported a consistent loss-making position, caused by the economic downturn. At this time the airfield manager changed to Matt Wilkins, a property consultant retained by the owners.

It was announced on 2 July 2013 that the airfield had been sold to a company belonging to local aviation enthusiast, Geoffrey Lynch, by Morgan Stanley for an undisclosed price. Morgan Stanley had become the owners when they purchased the portfolio of loans which owned the airfield from the Irish National Asset Management Agency. Wilkins was retained by Lynch following the purchase and continues to manage the airfield. Lynch has stated that he intends for the airfield to continue in use and plans expansions.

Three new hangars and additional office space were built in 2013/14. Two new Nissen huts, housing a Museum and Facilities Block, were built in 2015. A two-storey office building followed in 2017

== Electric Flight ==
The airfield was the first in the UK to install and commission an electric aircraft charging point, available for public use from July 2021, and is the home of the NUNCATS project which is testing a prototype electric Zenith CH750, with a production version intended for use in the developing world, powered by a network of solar chargers at small unmade landing strips. The factory is planned to be based in a World War 2 building at the airfield. The charger and project have been the subject of an official visit by Parliamentary Under-Secretary of State for Transport Robert Courts.

== Old Buckenham Airshow ==
In December 2011 it was announced that the Old Buckenham Airshow would return in 2012. The show had not gone ahead in 2011 due to the financial climate and management issues. It was later confirmed that the headline act would be the Old Flying Machine Company Spitfire and Mustang Duo of MH434 and Mustang "Ferocious Frankie" both of which belonged to the late Ray Hanna.

The airfield management declared the 2012 Airshow a success and announced that the Airshow would once again become an annual event. On 25 October 2012, it was announced that the 2013 Airshow would be a two-day event. Subsequent announcements from the airfield indicated that the main acts would be the return of the Spitfire and Mustang Duo, together with a World Record attempt by Brendan O'Brien. O'Brien was attempting a new world record; the shortest distance truck top landing recorded. Wind conditions on the day meant that O'Briens chances of success were slim and he came within inches of achieving his goal on the 5th attempt. On landing, it was agreed that the record would be attempted again in 2014.

The 2014 Airshow took place on 26 and 27 July 2014. The Airshow was the lead item on the second bulletin of Mustard TV, a recently launched terrestrial TV channel for the greater Norwich area. The 2014 show was declared a success and described as the "Biggest yet"

The 2015 Airshow was announced in the press on 17 September 2014. The Airshow featured the reunion of Honor Blackman who played Pussy Galore in the James Bond film Goldfinger with the Hiller UH-12 helicopter G-ASAZ which she starred with in the movie.

The 2016 and 2017 Airshow were reported as being a success and featured Sally B.

== Tourism Award ==
The Old Buckenham Airshow was named the Eastern Daily Press EDP Hoseasons "Family Event of the Year" in 2016.

== War memorial ==
The memorial consists of a large stone of black granite, carved into the form of a tailplane from the Consolidated B-24 Liberators which were based at the airfield and was installed on 29 July 1990.

In October 2012 work started to relocate the memorial stone commemorating the 366 USAAF personnel who died serving from RAF Old Buckenham. The new garden was officially opened by Pat Ramm who officiated at the Remembrance Sunday service attended by over 400 people.

The memorial garden features flagpoles which usually fly two American Flags. During large events and Remembrance Sunday the poles fly a large American Flag and Union Jack. The memorial stone is at the end of a path cut in the form of a figure 8 to symbolise the Eighth Air Force. The figure 8 path is made from large blue slate chippings. A commemorative plaque at its base reads "This Memorial Garden was opened on 11 November 2012 by Pat Ramm. It was created by Shaun Hindle, Steve Garrett, Scott Cooper, Lee Belcher & Matt Wilkins"

In 2013 the airfield changed its logo to a shield, originally carved by a serving USAAF officer during World War II. The shield appears on the War Memorial and is now used by the airfield in all its activities. The memorial is described by the airfield as being the main focal point of the airfield. The airfield management have said that they are fostering links with Memorial Groups in the United States.

== 453rd Bomb Group Museum ==
In February 2015, it was announced that the airfield has applied for permission to erect a museum at the site. The plans are for the erection of two Nissen Huts, one of which will house items described as having the potential to be the largest collection of 453rd Bomb Group memorabilia in existence.

The 453rd Bombardment Group Museum opened on Remembrance Sunday 2015.

== The 8th Air Force Heritage Gallery ==
An additional Museum was opened on Remembrance Sunday 2017 by United States Navy Captain (United States O-6) Poston, whose Great Uncle served in the 453rd Bombardment Group at RAF Old Buckenham. The new museum covers the wider subject of the Eighth Air Force of which the 453rd were a part.

== Military & Vintage Revival & Battlefront Military Museum ==
In June 2012 Battlefront, The East England Military Museum, moved to hangars at Old Buckenham Airfield. Their base at the airfield contains over 5,000 exhibits, currently not on display to the public. In October 2012 it was announced that the airfield and museum would collaborate on a new show called Military Revival Promotional videos were released, showing a Citroen Van being destroyed by a FV180 Combat Engineer Tractor and a lawn mower being flattened by an unexploded World War II German bomb.

The first Military Revival took place on 5 and 6 October it was announced that the show would be run again in 2014. Following Military Revival, it was announced that several of the main exhibits would be placed on permanent public display at the airfield by Battlefront. Machines on display include a Russian T-55 tank which was used in the 1995 James Bond film GoldenEye, a Multiple Launch Rocket System and a MGM-52 Lance nuclear missile.

The 2014 Military Revival event was deemed a success, and it was confirmed that the show would run again in 2015, with a joint military and vintage theme.

In January 2015, the airfield confirmed the inclusion of a Vintage theme by announcing a new name for the show, including a new website.

== A Celebration of the Life of Wing Commander Ken Wallis ==
On 4 September the airfield announced that it had been asked by the Wallis family to host a day of celebration for Ken Wallis. Wallis had been a regular visitor to the airfield for thirty years, last attending during the 2013 Airshow and had been given lifetime membership as member number 007, celebrating his contribution to the airfield, aviation and marking his appearance as James Bond in You Only Live Twice with the autogyro Little Nellie which Wallis had designed and built.

The airfield's Blister Hangar was cleared and Little Nellie was put on display on a stage in the centre. The rear wall of the hangar featured a 40-foot banner showing pictures from Wallis' life. Local planning regulations were lifted to allow autogyros to fly in. It was anticipated that 500 people would attend but actual attendance was estimated as 3–4,000.

== Aero Engineering Centre ==
In March 2014 the airfield announced the opening of a new Engineering Centre. The new centre incorporates a CAA Part M Engineering service by The Light Aircraft Company, avionics maintenance by Avitronics, and aircraft painting and interiors by Custom Air.

== Tenants and non-aviation activities ==
Aircraft engineers, classic car restorers, a race team, aircraft broker and TV company are based at the airfield. There are also areas for TV filming and buildings and land occupied by Battlefront. The airfield operates a fleet of specially modified Honda Gyro Canopy scooters.

The Airfield is also home to a Flight Simulator Centre

== Accidents and incidents ==
- 14 July 1991 – Piper PA-23 G-BCBM landed with its undercarriage retracted and was damaged beyond economic repair.
- 1 August 2004 – Stearman biplane, G-BAVO, known as "Two-Six" belonging to TV star Martin Shaw crashed on takeoff. Shaw who was not at the controls bought the salvage and rebuilt the aircraft as documented by the TV series Martin Shaw: Aviators.
- 29 April 2006 – David Crowcroft, suffering from an obsessive condition, committed suicide by cutting his parachute cords during a training jump.
- 25 March 2007 – Whilst conducting parachute dropping, Piper PA-32 G-BAXJ suffered an engine failure and landed short of the airfield. There were no reported injuries.
- 9 May 2010 – Mooney M20 G-JDIX crashed while making an approach to the airfield; the pilot was killed.
- 22 April 2015 – Edge 360 G-EDGJ a fatal accident occurred as the aircraft was being flown as part of an Aerobatic display. David Jenkins, a skilled and respected pilot, died.
- 11 June 2016 – Piper Pa-24 Comanche, G-ARLB suffered damage after a heavy landing. There were no reported injuries.
- 11 June 2017 – Luscombe 8E Silvaire Deluxe, G-BRGF crashed on landing after its landing gear made contact with a rapeseed crop close to the end of the runway. There were no reported injuries.
- 19 July 2018 – Auster 6A Tugmaster, G-APRO Stalled and impacted with the ground on landing.
