= 702d Expeditionary Airlift Squadron =

702d Expeditionary Airlift Squadron

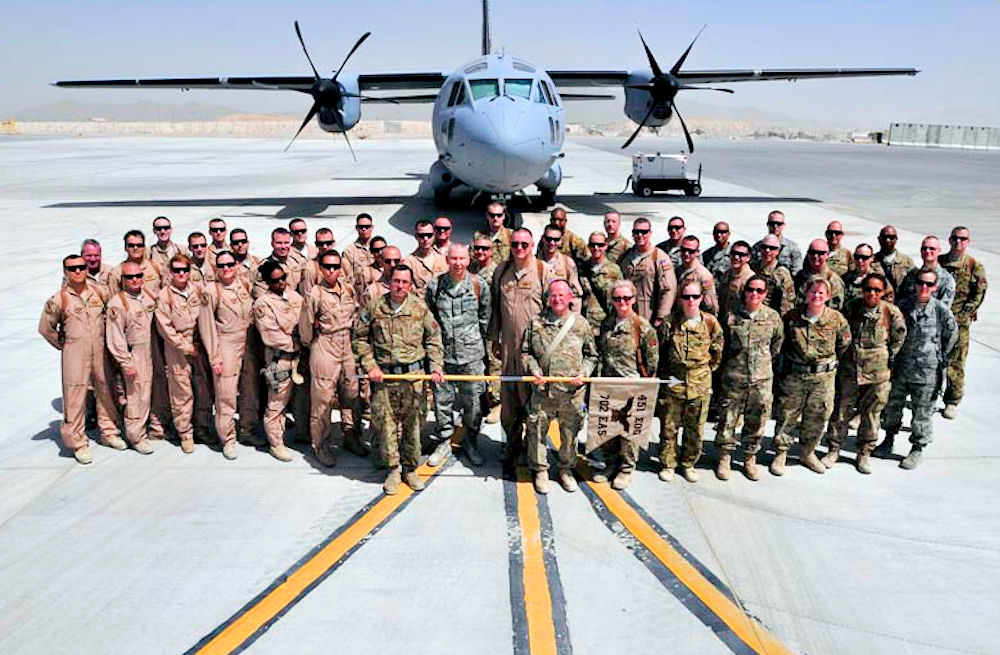
- Members of the 702d Expeditionary Airlift Squadron in front of a C-27 Spartan at Kandahar Air Base Afghanistan
- Active: 1943-1945; 1947-1949; 1952-1957; 1957-1965; 1971-2000: After 2010
- Country: United States
- Branch: United States Air Force
- Role: Airlift
- Part of: Air Combat Command
- Nickname: Dixie Wing (1962-1965)
- Mottos: We Fly for the Troops (2011-2012); Professionalism and Experience (1996-2000)
- Decorations: Distinguished Unit Citation; Air Force Meritorious Unit Award; Air Force Outstanding Unit Award; French Croix de Guerre with Palm

Insignia
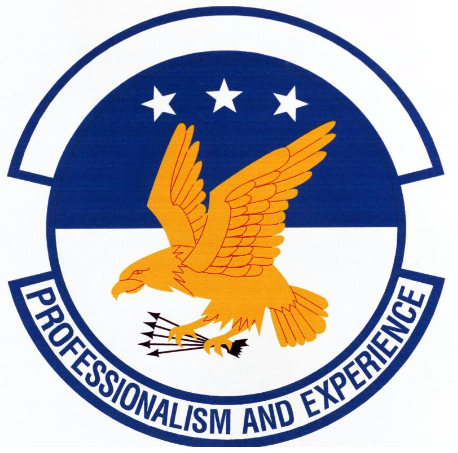
- 702d Airlift Squadron emblem (Note: Approved c. July 1996.)

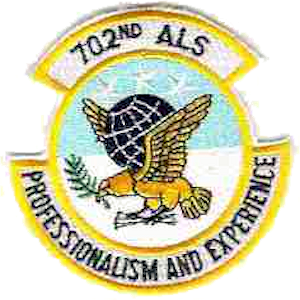
- Patch with 702d Airlift Squadron emblem

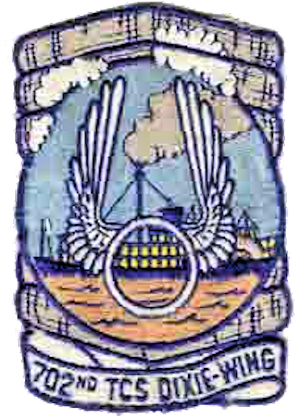
- Patch with 702d Troop Carrier Squadron emblem (Note: Approved 9 January 1962. Description: On and over a gray bale of cotton, from which protrudes wisps of white cotton, a disc bordered Air Force blue, bearing a landscape of medium blue sky and muddy, brown river water; churning through the water, a side view of a paddle wheel river boat, Air Force blue, the windows lighted Air Force golden yellow, the smoke stack belching forth a cloud of gray smoke, a white flag at the prow, the side-wheel gray; all surmounted by white winged annulet; outlines and details Air Force blue throughout.)

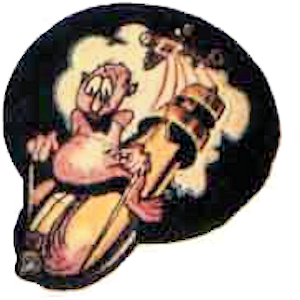
- 702d Bombardment Squadron emblem
- World War II Fuselage Code: WW

The 702d Expeditionary Airlift Squadron is a provisional United States Air Force unit. It is assigned to Air Combat Command to activate or inactivate as needed. It was active at Kandahar Airfield from 2011 to 2012.

The squadron was first activated in April 1943 as the 702d Bombardment Squadron. After training in the United States, it deployed with its Consolidated B-24 Liberators to the European Theater of Operations, where it participated in the strategic bombing campaign until the end of hostilities, earning a Distinguished Unit Citation and a French Croix de Guerre with Palm for its actions. It returned to the United States in the summer of 1945 and was inactivated in September.

The squadron was reactivated in the reserves in 1947, although it is not clear whether it was fully manned or equipped before inactivating in 1949. It was activated again in the reserves in 1952 as the 702d Fighter-Bomber Squadron. It was inactivated in July 1957, but activated a few months later in the airlift role as the 702d Troop Carrier Squadron. The squadron was called to active duty during the Cuban Missile Crisis and inactivated in 1965. It was activated again in 1971 as the 702d Military Airlift Squadron and, through 1995, was a reserve associate units of the 438th Airlift Wing at McGuire Air Force Base, New Jersey.

== History ==
=== World War II ===
==== Training in the United States ====
The 702d Bombardment Squadron was activated 1 April 1943 at Gowen Field, Idaho, where initial organization took place while key personnel traveled to Orlando Army Air Base, Florida for training with the Army Air Forces School of Applied Tactics. Both elements met at Wendover Army Air Field, Utah on 8 June 1943, where initial training with the Consolidated B-24 Liberator took place. The squadron moved to Sioux City Army Air Base, Iowa in July 1943 to complete training. In September the 702d began to receive B-24H aircraft, the model of the Liberator they would fly in combat.

On 20 October 1943 the ground echelon moved to Camp Shanks, New York and embarked on the RMS Queen Mary on 26 October 1943, sailing next day. The unit arrived in the Firth of Clyde, Scotland on 2 November 1943 and disembarked at Gourock. The air echelon departed Sioux City late in October 1943 and flew to the United Kingdom via the southern route: Florida, Puerto Rico, Brazil, and West Africa. Upon arrival, the squadron was stationed at RAF Tibenham as part of the 2nd Combat Bombardment Wing. The group was initially given a fuselage code of IS.

==== Combat in Europe ====
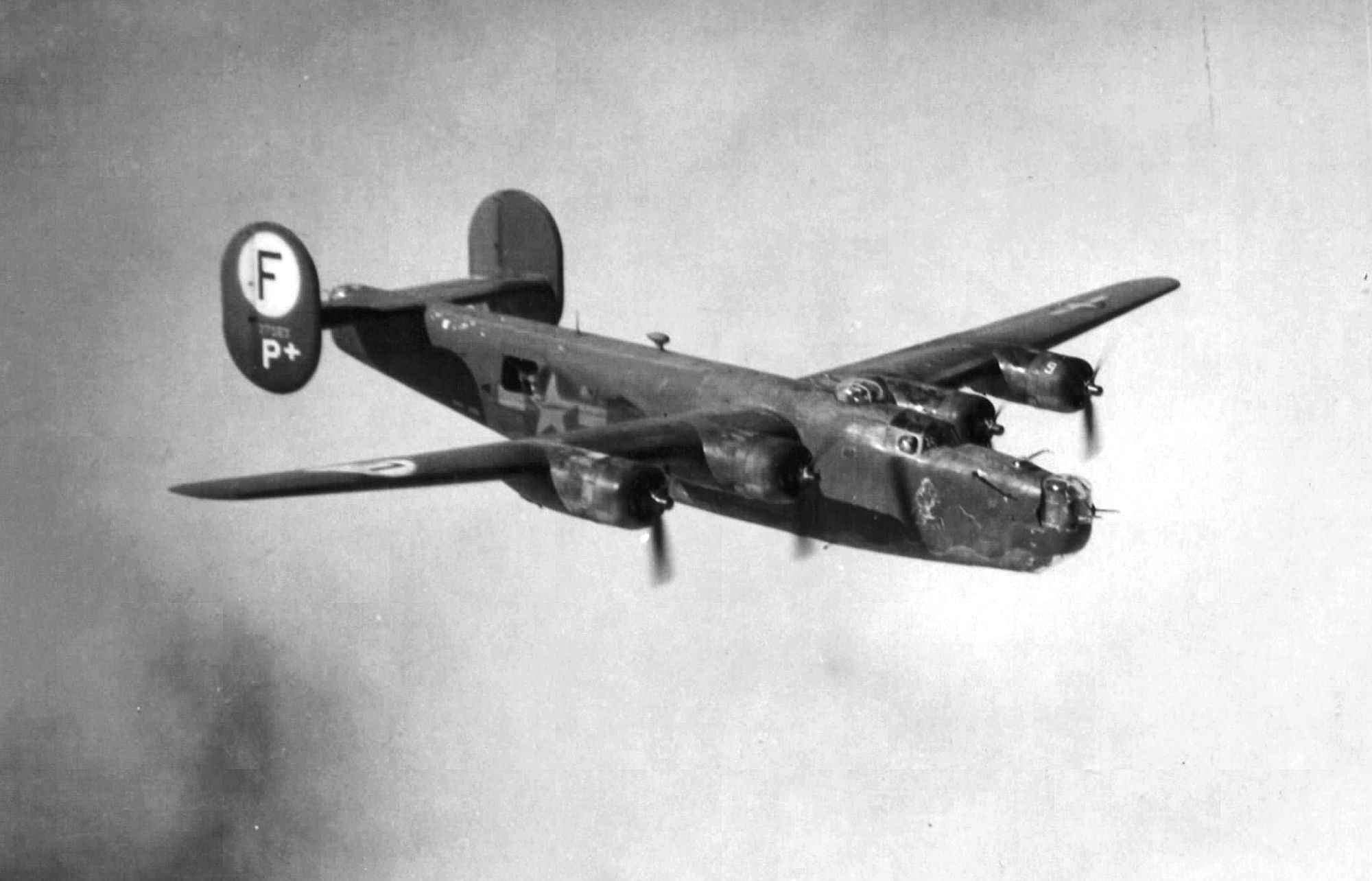
445th Group B-24H Liberator showing the 445th Bombardment Group's Circle F tail marking (Note: Aircraft is Ford Motors built Consolidated B-24H-1-FO Liberator, serial 42-7563, Hell's Warrior. This plane was later transferred to the 492d Bombardment Group for special operations missions. It was lost over Yugoslavia on 9 February 1945. Baugher, Joe (26 April 2023). "1942 USAF Serial Numbers". Joe Baugher.)

The 702d entered combat on 13 December 1943 by attacking U-boat installations at Kiel. The unit operated primarily as a strategic bombardment organization until the war ended, striking such targets as industries in Osnabrück, synthetic oil plants in Lutzendorf, chemical works in Ludwigshafen, marshalling yards at Hamm, an airfield at Munich, an ammunition plant at Duneberg, underground oil storage facilities at Ehmen, and factories at Münster.

The squadron participated in the Allied campaign against the German aircraft industry during Big Week, from 20 to 25 February 1944, being awarded a Distinguished Unit Citation for attacking a Bf 110 aircraft assembly plant at Gotha on 24 February. This was the longest running continuous air battle of World War II - some two and a half hours of fighter attacks and flak en route and leaving the target area. Bomb damage assessment photographs showed that the plant was knocked out of production indefinitely.

The unit occasionally flew air interdiction and air support missions. It helped to prepare for the invasion of Normandy by bombing airfields, V-1 and V-2 launch sites, and other targets. It attacked shore installations on D-Day, 6 June 1944, and supported ground forces at Saint-Lô by striking enemy defenses in July 1944. During the Battle of the Bulge, between December 1944 and January 1945 it bombed German communications. Early on 24 March 1945 the 702d dropped food, medical supplies, and ammunition to troops that landed near Wesel during the airborne assault across the Rhine and that afternoon flew a bombing mission to the same area, hitting a landing ground at Stormede.

On occasion the unit dropped propaganda leaflets and hauled fuel to France. It was awarded the Croix de guerre with Palm by the French government for operations in the theater from December 1943 to February 1945 supplying the resistance.

Probably, the 702d's most tragic mission was the attack on Kassel of 27 September 1944. In cloud, the navigator of the lead bomber of the 445th Bombardment Group miscalculated and the 35 planes of the 702d and the other squadrons of the group left the bomber stream of the 2d Air Division and proceeded to Göttingen some 35 miles (56 km) from the primary target. After the bomb run, the group was alone in the skies and was attacked from the rear by an estimated 150 Luftwaffe planes, resulting in the most concentrated air battle in history. The Luftwaffe unit was a Sturmgruppe, a special unit intended to attack bombers by flying in tight formations of up to ten fighters in line abreast. This was intended to break the bomber formation at a single pass. The 361st Fighter Group intervened, preventing complete destruction of the group. Twenty-nine German and 25 American planes went down in a 15-mile (24 km) radius. Only four of the 445th group's planes made it back to the base – two crashing in France, one in Belgium, another at RAF Old Buckenham. Two landed at RAF Manston. Only one of the 35 attacking aircraft was fit to fly next day.

After the end of the air war in Europe, the 702d flew low level "Trolley" missions over Germany carrying ground personnel so they could see the result of their efforts during the war. The group's air echelon departed Tibenham on 17 May 1945, and left the United Kingdom on 20 May 1945. The 702d ground echelon sailed on the USAT Cristobal from Bristol. The ship arrived at New York on 8 June 1945. Personnel were given 30 days R&R. The squadron reestablished at Fort Dix, New Jersey, with the exception of the air echelon, which had flown to Sioux Falls Army Air Field, South Dakota. Most personnel were discharged or transferred to other units, and only a handful were left when the unit was inactivated on 12 September 1945.

=== Air Force reserves ===
==== Bombardment unit ====
The 702d Bombardment Squadron was activated again under Air Defense Command (ADC) in the reserves during the summer of 1947 at Hill Field, Utah, where it trained under the supervision of the 406th AAF Base Unit. The squadron was nominally a Boeing B-29 Superfortress very heavy bombardment squadron and assigned to its World War II headquarters. In 1948, Continental Air Command (ConAC) assumed reserve training responsibility from ADC and the 406th Base Unit became the 2344th AF Reserve Training Center. The squadron was inactivated in June 1949 when ConAC reorganized to the wing base organizational model. It does not appear that the squadron was ever equipped with aircraft, however, and reserve training at Hill was continued by the 9013th Volunteer Air Reserve Training Wing.

==== Fighter operations ====
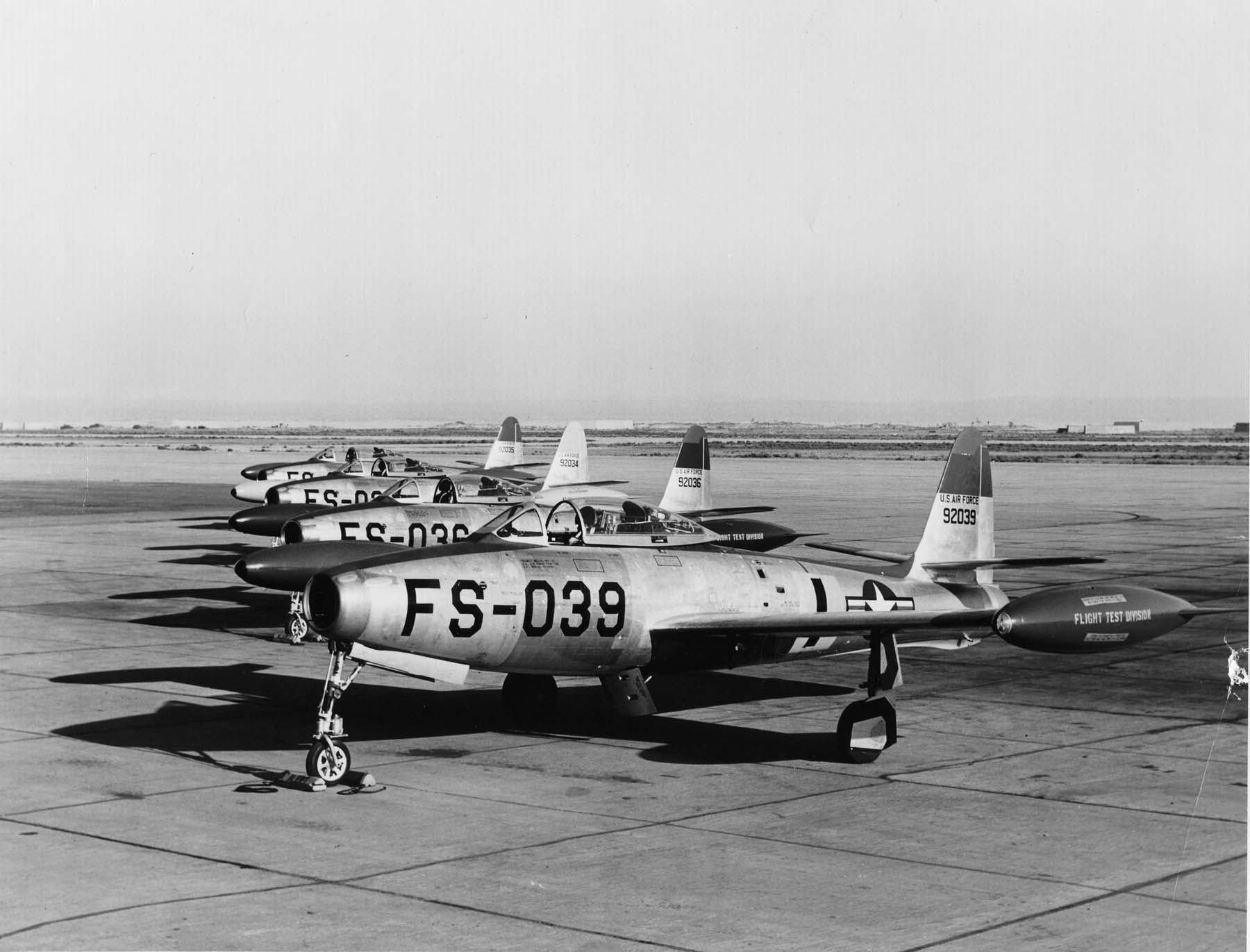
F-84s as flown by the squadron in the 1950s

The squadron was activated again in the reserves in 1952 at Buffalo Municipal Airport, New York as the 702d Fighter-Bomber Squadron. Although designated as a fighter unit, until 1955 the squadron primarily flew North American T-6 trainer aircraft, although it was equipped with a few North American F-51 Mustangs and Lockheed F-80 Shooting Stars. In 1955 the 702d moved a few miles to Niagara Falls Municipal Airport as a Republic F-84 Thunderjet unit. Despite its fighter-bomber designation, the squadron was gained by ADC upon mobilization. ADC required the squadron be designed to augment active duty squadrons capable of performing air defense missions for an indefinite period after mobilization independently of its parent wing. In 1957, budget cuts led to a reduction in the number of reserve squadrons from 55 to 45. In addition, within the Air Staff was a recommendation that the reserve fighter mission be given to the Air National Guard and replaced by the troop carrier mission. As a result, the United States Air Force reduced its operations at Niagara Falls and the 702d was inactivated in July 1957.

==== Troop carrier operations ====
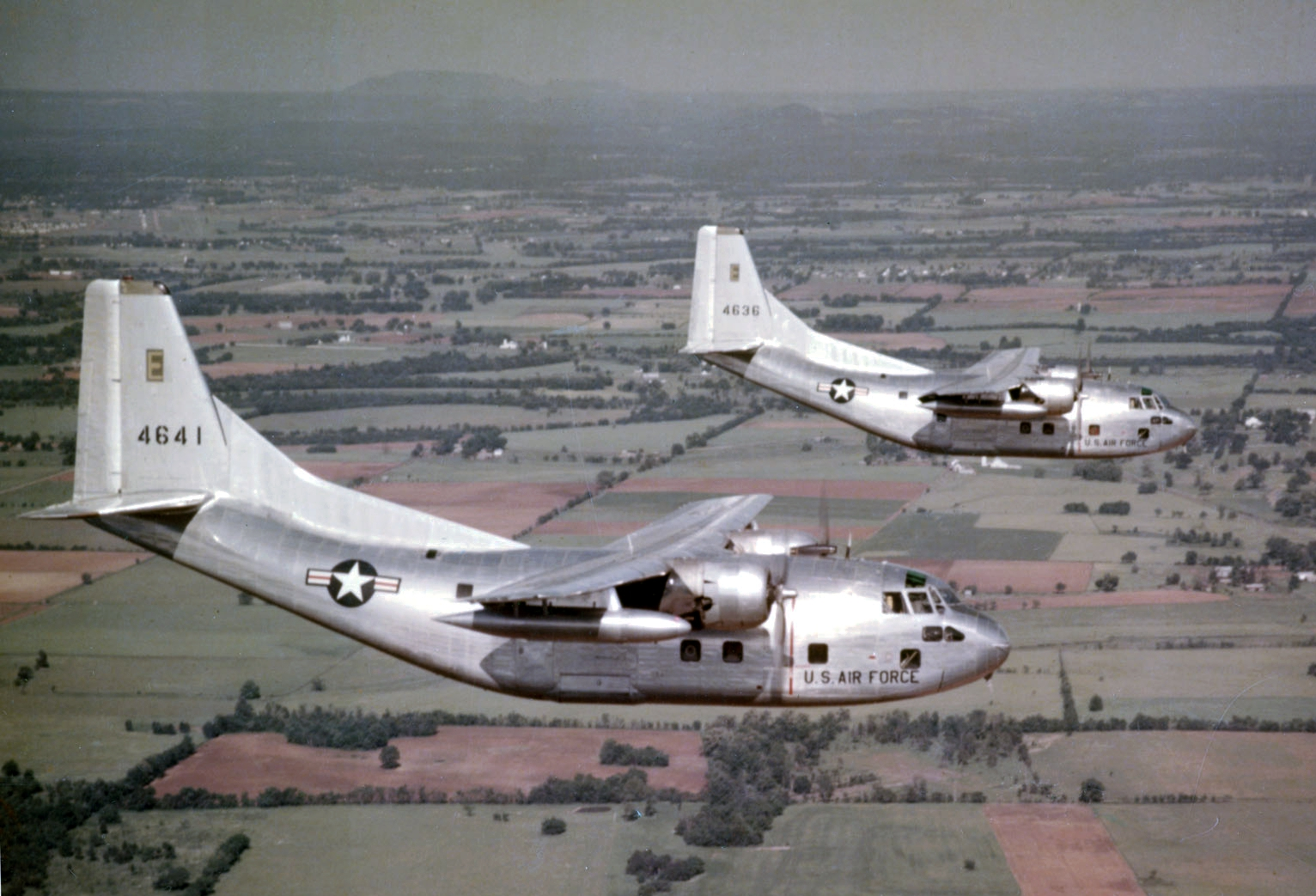
C-123Bs in flight

As the conversion of the reserves to a tactical airlift force continued, the squadron became the 702d Troop Carrier Squadron at Memphis Municipal Airport on 16 November 1957, when the 445th Troop Carrier Group assumed the resources of the 319th Fighter-Bomber Wing as it briefly flew Douglas C-47 Skytrains before converting to the Fairchild C-123 Provider. When ConAC reorganized under the dual deputy system in November 1958 the squadron transferred directly to the 445th Wing although it was detached from wing headquarters, which were at Dobbins Air Force Base, Georgia. The separation of squadrons from their parent wings, under what was called the Detached Squadron Concept, had evolved in the spring of 1955, when ConAC decided that moving squadrons to separate sites offered several advantages: communities were more likely to accept the smaller squadrons than the large wings and the location of separate squadrons in smaller population centers would facilitate recruiting and manning. However, under this concept, support organizations remained with the wing.

Although the dispersal of flying units under the Detached Squadron Concept was not a problem when the entire wing was called to active service, mobilizing a single flying squadron and elements to support it proved difficult. This weakness was demonstrated in the partial mobilization of reserve units during the Berlin Crisis of 1961. To resolve this, ConAC determined to reorganize its reserve wings by establishing groups with support elements for each of its troop carrier squadrons at the start of 1962. This reorganization would facilitate mobilization of elements of wings in various combinations when needed. However, as the plan to form support units at dispersed locations was entering its implementation phase, another partial mobilization, which included the 702d, occurred. The squadron entered active duty on 28 October 1962 for the Cuban Missile Crisis, with the unit being released on 22 November 1962. The formation of troop carrier groups was delayed until February for wings that had been mobilized. In February, the 920th Troop Carrier Group, which included the 702d and support organizations, was activated at Memphis. In 1965, reserve operations at Memphis were terminated and the 702d was inactivated.

==== Reserve associate ====
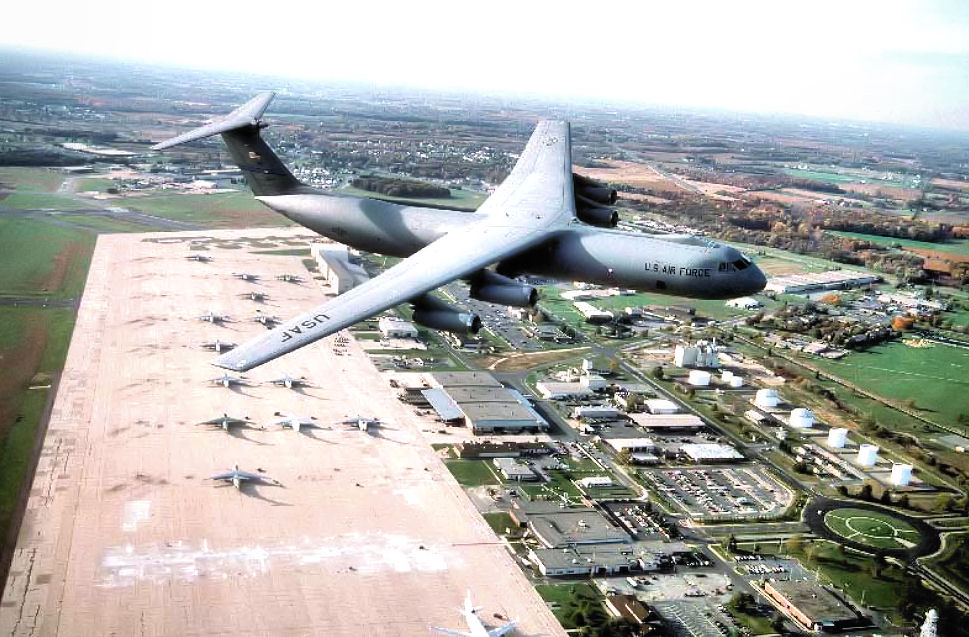
C-141 of the 438th and 514th Wings over McGuire

By 1968 regular air force military airlift squadrons were operating the Lockheed C-141 Starlifter, while the reserves still flew the obsolete Douglas C-124 Globemaster II. As the Globemaster was retired, Air Force Reserve formed associate units, initially with the C-141. In this program reserve units flew and maintained aircraft owned by an associated regular unit. In April 1971, the squadron was redesignated the 701st Military Airlift Squadron and activated at McGuire Air Force Base, New Jersey, where it was assigned to the 903d Military Airlift Group as an associate of the 438th Military Airlift Wing. Two years later, the 514th Military Airlift Wing replaced the 903d Group as the reserve command for McGuire airlift units. It provided worldwide airlift until the retirement of C-141 aircraft in 2000.

=== Expeditionary unit ===
The 702d was converted to provisional status as the 702d Expeditionary Airlift Squadron and joined the 451st Expeditionary Operations Group at Kandahar Airfield, Afghanistan in the summer of 2011. The Kandahar squadron was made up of deployed Ohio Air National Guard and Oklahoma Army National Guard members, flying the Alenia C-27J Spartan to support personnel deployed at forward operating bases and flew its first combat mission four days after standing up. The majority of the squadron members were drawn from the Maryland Air National Guard. The squadron inactivated the following year. During the deployment the squadron flew 3200 missions despite being equipped with only two aircraft.

== Lineage ==
- Constituted as the 702d Bombardment Squadron (Heavy) on 20 March 1943

Activated on 1 April 1943

- Redesignated 702d Bombardment Squadron, Heavy on 20 August 1943

Inactivated on 12 September 1945

- Redesignated 702d Bombardment Squadron, Very Heavy on 13 May 1947

Activated in the reserve on 1 August 1947
Inactivated on 27 June 1949.

- Redesignated 702d Fighter-Bomber Squadron on 24 June 1952

Activated in the reserve on 8 July 1952
Inactivated on 1 July 1957

- Redesignated 702d Troop Carrier Squadron, Medium on 24 October 1957

Activated in the reserve on 16 November 1957
Redesignated 702d Troop Carrier Squadron (Assault) on 25 September 1958
Inactivated on 15 December 1965

- Redesignated 702d Military Airlift Squadron (Associate) on 3 December 1970

Activated on 1 April 1971
Redesignated 702d Airlift Squadron (Associate) on 1 February 1992
Redesignated 702d Airlift Squadron on 1 October 1994
Inactivated on 1 March 2000

- Converted to provisional status and redesignated 702d Expeditionary Airlift Squadron

Activated on 31 July 2011
Inactivated c. 31 July 2012

=== Assignments ===
- 445th Bombardment Group: 1 April 1943 – 12 September 1945
- 445th Bombardment Group: 1 August 1947 – 27 June 1949
- 445th Fighter-Bomber Group: 8 July 1952 – 1 July 1957
- 445th Troop Carrier Group: 16 November 1957
- 445th Troop Carrier Wing: 25 September 1958
- 920th Troop Carrier Group: 11 February 1963 – 15 December 1965
- 903d Military Airlift Group, 1 April 1971
- 514th Military Airlift Wing: 1 July 1973
- 514th Operations Group: 1 August 1992 – 1 March 2000
- Air Combat Command to activate or inactivate as needed

451st Expeditionary Operations Group: 31 July 2011 - 2012

=== Stations ===
- Gowen Field, Idaho, 1 April 1943
- Wendover Field, Utah, 8 June 1943
- Sioux City Army Air Base, Iowa, 8 July 1943 – 20 October 1943
- RAF Tibenham (Station 124), England, 2 November 1943 – 30 May 1945
- Fort Dix Army Air Base, New Jersey, 9 June 1945 – 12 September 1945
- Hill Field (later Hill Air Force Base), Utah, 1 August 1947 – 27 June 1949
- McChord Air Force Base, Washington, 12 July 1947 – 27 June 1949
- Buffalo Municipal Airport, New York, 8 July 1952
- Niagara Falls Municipal Airport, New York, 15 June 1955
- Memphis Municipal Airport, Tennessee, 16 November 1957 – 15 December 1965
- McGuire Air Force Base, New Jersey, 1 April 1971 – 1 March 2000
- Kandahar Air Base, Afghanistan, 31 July 2011 - 2012

=== Aircraft ===
- Consolidated B-24 Liberator, 1943–1945
- Fairchild C-123 Provider, 1957–1975
- Lockheed C-141 Starlifter, 1973–2000
- Alenia C-27J Spartan, 2011-2012

=== Awards and campaigns ===
Award streamer	Award	Dates	Notes
	Distinguished Unit Citation	24 February 1944	Gotha, Germany 702d Bombardment Squadron
	Air Force Meritorious Unit Award	1 June 2011-31 January 2012	702d Expeditionary Airlift Squadron
	Air Force Meritorious Unit Award	1 February 2012-31 January 2013	702d Expeditionary Airlift Squadron
	Air Force Outstanding Unit Award	1 July 1973-31 January 1975	702d Military Airlift Squadron
	Air Force Outstanding Unit Award	1 August 1977-31 January 1978	702d Military Airlift Squadron
	Air Force Outstanding Unit Award	1 August 1988-31 July 1989	702d Military Airlift Squadron
	Air Force Outstanding Unit Award	1 August 1990-31 July 1992	702d Military Airlift Squadron (later 702d Airlift Squadron)
	Air Force Outstanding Unit Award	1 October 1995-30 September 1997	702d Airlift Squadron
	Air Force Outstanding Unit Award	1 October 1999-30 September 2001	702d Airlift Squadron
	French Croix de Guerre with Palm	December 1943-February 1945	702d Bombardment Squadron

Campaign Streamer	Campaign	Dates	Notes
	Air Offensive, Europe	2 November 1943 – 5 June 1944	702d Bombardment Squadron
	Air Combat, EAME Theater	2 November 1943 – 11 May 1945	702d Bombardment Squadron
	Normandy	6 June 1944 – 24 July 1944	702d Bombardment Squadron
	Northern France	25 July 1944 – 14 September 1944	702d Bombardment Squadron
	Rhineland	15 September 1944 – 21 March 1945	702d Bombardment Squadron
	Ardennes-Alsace	16 December 1944 – 25 January 1945	702d Bombardment Squadron
	Central Europe	22 March 1944 – 21 May 1945	702d Bombardment Squadron

== See also ==
- B-24 Liberator units of the United States Army Air Forces
- List of United States Air Force airlift squadrons
