= 453rd Bombardment Group =

Inactive United States Air Force unit

453rd Bombardment Group (later 453d Expeditionary Air Refueling Group)
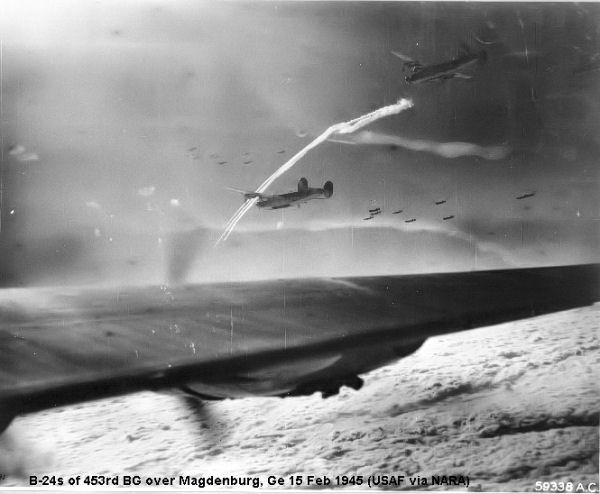
- 453rd Bomb Group B-24 Liberators on a mission over enemy territory
- Active: 1943–1945; 1992–1994
- Country: United States
- Branch: United States Air Force
- Role: heavy bomber, air refueling
- Mottos: Attack and Destroy
- Engagements: European Theater of Operations

Insignia
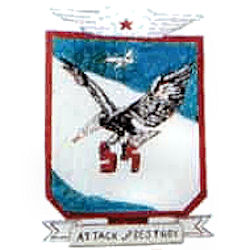
- 453d Bombardment Group emblem
- Early 453d Bombardment Group tail marking: Circle J
- Later 453d Bombardment Group tail marking: Black, diagonal white stripe

The 453rd Bombardment Group is an inactive United States Air Force unit that was first organized in June 1943, during World War II, as a Consolidated B-24 Liberator heavy bomber group. After training in the United States, it deployed to England in December 1943, and, starting in February 1944, participated in the strategic bombing campaign against Germany with Eighth Air Force. Its 733d Bombardment Squadron completed 82 consecutive missions without a loss, a record for Eighth Air Force bomber units. James Stewart, of film fame, was group operations officer from 31 March to 1 July 1944. The group was programmed for redeployment to the Pacific and returned to the United States in May 1945 for training, however the Japanese surrender cancelled these plans and the group was inactivated in September 1945.

The group was redesignated the 453rd Operations Group and activated at Fairchild Air Force Base in June 1992 to command Air Mobility Command (AMC)'s air refueling units at Fairchild Air Force Base, Washington. It was inactivated in July 1994, when the 92nd Bomb Wing at Fairchild became an air refueling unit and transferred from Air Combat Command to AMC.

It was converted to provisional status as the 453d Expeditionary Air Refueling Group in 2002.

== History ==
=== World War II ===
==== Training in the United States ====
The 453rd Bombardment Group was activated at Wendover Field, Utah on 1 June 1943 with the 732nd, 733rd, 734th and 735th Bombardment Squadrons assigned as its original elements. It then moved to Pocatello Army Air Field, Idaho, where it was brought up to strength and trained with Consolidated B-24 Liberators. The group completed its training at March Field, California, in December before departing for the European Theater of Operations, with the ground echelon embarking on 2 December.

==== Combat in Europe ====
The ground echelon arrived at the group's combat station, RAF Old Buckenham, on 23 December 1943. By January 1944, it was fully established at Old Buckenham with the arrival of the air echelon. The 453rd flew its first mission against an airfield at Tours on 4 February 1944. It then participated primarily in the strategic bombing campaign against Germany. Toward the end of February, the squadron took part in Big Week, the concentrated attack on the German aircraft manufacturing industry. Other targets in Germany included a rail viaduct at Altenbeken, a fuel storage facility at Dulmen, oil refineries at Gelsenkirchen, an ordnance depot at Glinde, an aircraft assembly plant at Gotha, a rail center at Hamm, a chemical factory at Leverkusen, a commercial canal at Minden, an airfield at Neumunster and marshalling yards at Paderborn.

The group also engaged in air support and air interdiction missions. It bombed V-1 flying bomb and V-2 rocket launch sites, airfields and coastal defense guns to prepare for Operation Overlord, the invasion of Normandy. On D-Day, it struck coastal fortifications between Le Havre and Cherbourg Naval Base and enemy positions inland from the landing area. It made attacks on enemy troops to support Operation Cobra, the breakout at Saint Lo in July 1944. It bombed German lines of communication during the Battle of the Bulge in December 1944 and January 1945.

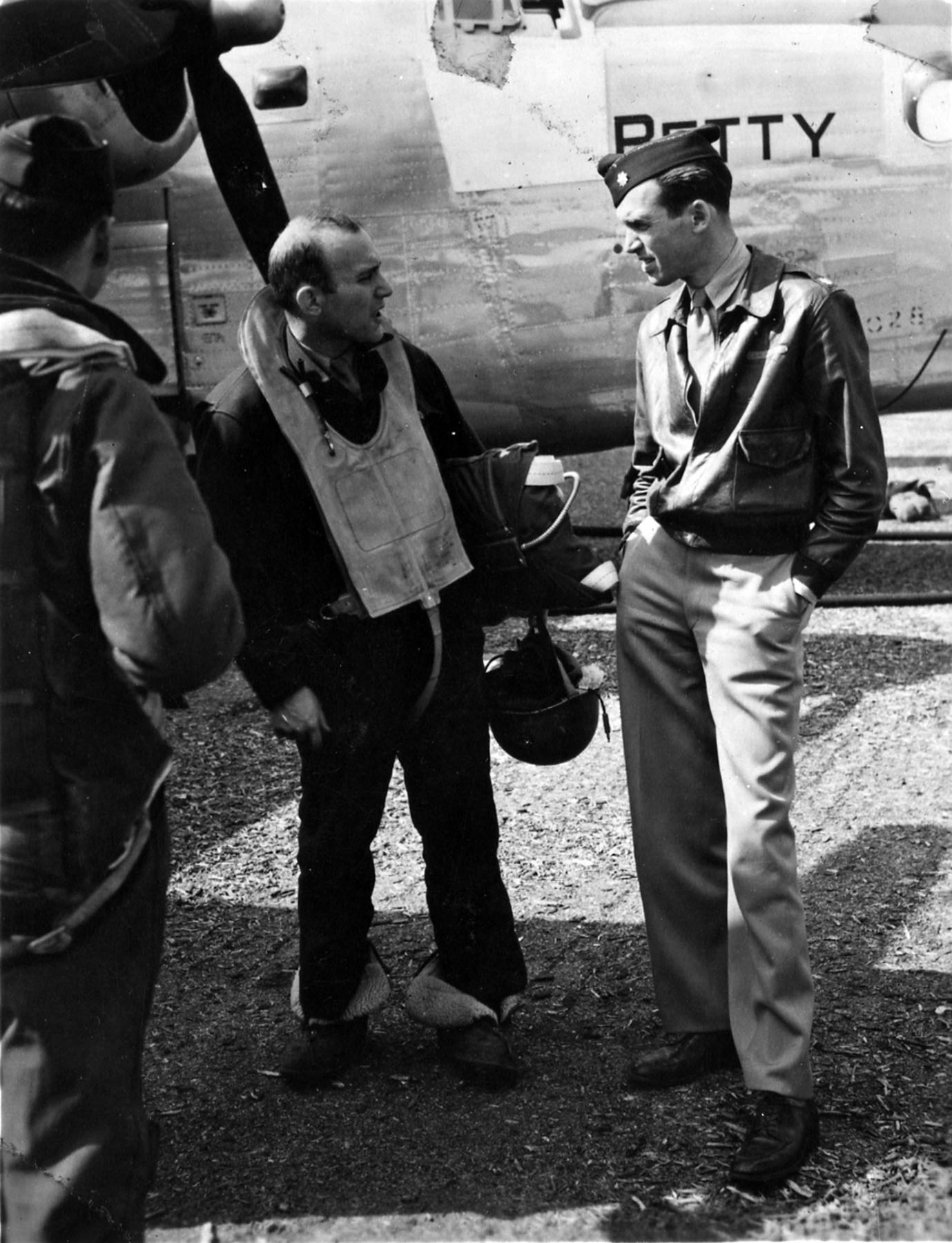
Major James "Jimmy" Stewart, right, 1943

On two occasions, the squadron carried out airlift missions. In September 1944, it flew rations, gasoline and blankets to advancing troops in France. During Operation Varsity, the airborne assault across the Rhine near Wesel, it dropped medical supplies, food and ammunition to troops at the bridgehead. The squadron flew its last mission on 12 April 1945, and was withdrawn from combat to prepare for possible redeployment to the Pacific.

James "Jimmy" Stewart, the Hollywood movie star, was group operations officer at Old Buckenham during the spring of 1944. The actor Walter Matthau also served in the group as a radioman-gunner, rising to the rank of staff sergeant. The group's 733rd Bombardment Squadron flew 82 consecutive missions without a loss, which was a record for Eighth Air Force bomber units. The group flew 259 combat missions, during which it lost 58 Liberators, against the claim of 42 enemy aircraft destroyed.

==== Return and inactivation ====
The 453rd Group was withdrawn from combat operations on 12 April 1945 to prepare for possible redeployment to the Pacific Theater. Personnel departed Old Buckenham for the port of embarkation on 9 May 1945, apparently leaving their aircraft behind. The squadron assembled at New Castle Army Air Field, Delaware in late May, but soon moved to Fort Dix Army Air Base, New Jersey. Initial plans to convert the unit to a very heavy bomber squadron were canceled following the Japanese surrender in August 1945, after which the unit was inactivated on 12 September.

=== Tanker operations ===
When Strategic Air Command was disestablished on 1 June 1992, its 92nd Wing at Fairchild Air Force Base, Washington was transferred to the new Air Combat Command and redesignated the 92d Bomb Wing as it lost its refueling elements. Its 92d Air Refueling Squadron and its Boeing KC-135 Stratotankers were transferred to Air Mobility Command (AMC). The 453rd was redesignated the 453rd Operations Group and activated the same day as the headquarters for the 92d Air Refueling Squadron, which was assigned to it, along with the 453rd Operations Support Squadron.

However, with the drawdown of the manned bomber force, it was decided that Fairchild would become an AMC tanker base. In anticipation of the increase of the refueling mission at Fairchild, the 97th Air Refueling Squadron moved to Fairchild from Malmstrom Air Force Base, Montana on 1 April 1994, and the 96th and 98th Air Refueling Squadrons were activated and assigned to the group the same day. The transition was completed on 1 July 1994, when the 92nd Wing became the 92nd Air Refueling Wing as its 325th Bomb Squadron inactivated. The four refueling squadrons of the 453d transferred to the 92nd Operations Group and the 453d Group and its support squadron inactivated.

=== Expeditionary unit ===
In February 2001, the group was converted to provisional status as the 453rd Expeditionary Air Refueling Group and assigned to United States Air Forces in Europe to activate or inactivate as needed for contingency operations.

== 453rd Bomb Group Museum ==
In February 2015, it was announced that Old Buckenham Airport the modern civilian name for RAF Old Buckenham applied for permission to build a museum dedicated to the 453rd at their former base in England. The plans are for the erection of two Nissen huts, one of which will house an items described as having the potential to be the largest collection of 453rd Bomb Group memorabilia in existence.

== Lineage ==
- Constituted as the 453rd Bombardment Group (Heavy) on 14 May 1943

Activated on 1 June 1943

- Redesignated 453rd Bombardment Group, Heavy c.January 1944

Inactivated on 12 September 1945

- Redesignated 453rd Operations Group and activated on 1 June 1992

Inactivated 1 July 1994

- Converted to provisional status and redesignated 453d Expeditionary Air Refueling Group on 5 February 2001

=== Assignments ===
- II Bomber Command, 1 June – 2 December 1943
- 20th Combat Bombardment Wing, 23 December 1943
- 2d Combat Bombardment Wing, 8 January 1944 – 9 May 1945
- I Bomber Command, 18 June – 12 September 1945
- 43d Air Refueling Wing, 1 June 1992 – 1 July 1994
- United States Air Forces in Europe to activate or inactivate as needed after 5 February 2001

=== Components ===
- 92d Air Refueling Squadron, 1 June 1992 – 1 July 1994
- 96th Air Refueling Squadron, 1 April – 1 July 1994
- 97th Air Refueling Squadron, 1 April – 1 July 1994
- 98th Air Refueling Squadron, 1 April – 1 July 1994
- 453rd Operations Support Squadron, 1 June 1992 – 1 July 1994
- 732d Bombardment Squadron, 1 June 1943 – 12 September 1945
- 733d Bombardment Squadron, 1 June 1943 – 12 September 1945
- 734th Bombardment Squadron, 1 June 1943 – 12 September 1945
- 735th Bombardment Squadron, 1 June 1943 – 12 September 1945

=== Stations ===
- Wendover Field, Utah, 1 June 1943
- Pocatello Army Air Field, Idaho, 29 July 1943
- March Field, California, 30 September-2 December 1943
- RAF Old Buckenham (AAF-114), England, 23 December 1943 – 9 May 1945 144
- New Castle Army Air Field, Delaware, 25 May 1945
- Fort Dix Army Air Base, New Jersey, 18 June-12 September 1945
- Fairchild Air Force Base, Washington, 1 June 1992 – 1 July 1994

=== Aircraft ===
- Consolidated B-24 Liberator, 1943–1945
- Boeing KC-135 Stratotanker, 1992–1994

=== Campaigns ===
Campaign Streamer	Campaign	Dates	Notes
	Air Offensive, Europe	23 December 1943 – 5 June 1944	453rd Bombardment Group
	Normandy	6 June 1944 – 24 July 1944	453rd Bombardment Group
	Northern France	25 July 1944 – 14 September 1944	453rd Bombardment Group
	Rhineland	15 September 1944 – 21 March 1945	453rd Bombardment Group
	Ardennes-Alsace	16 December 1944 – 25 January 1945	453rd Bombardment Group
	Central Europe	22 March 1944 – 21 May 1945	453rd Bombardment Group
