= RAF Old Buckenham =

Former RAF station in Norfolk, England

RAF Old Buckenham USAAF Station 144
- Old Buckenham, Norfolk in England
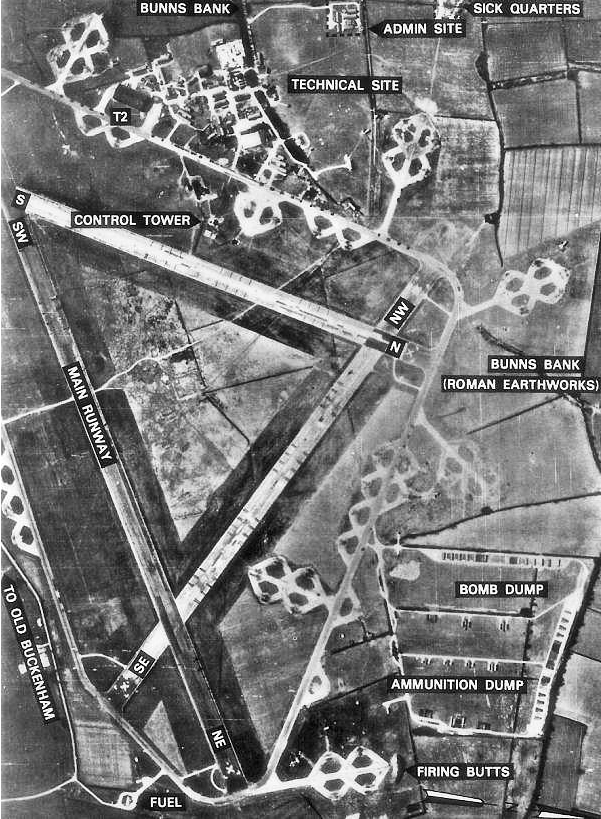
- Aerial Photo of Old Buckenham Airfield - 30 March 1946

Site information
- Code: OE
- Owner: Air Ministry
- Operator: Royal Air Force; United States Army Air Forces
- Controlled by: Eighth Air Force; RAF Maintenance Command

Location
- Location within Norfolk
- Coordinates: 52.504°N 1.063°E

Site history
- Built: 1942
- In use: 1943-1960
- Battles/wars: European Theatre of World War II; Air Offensive, Europe July 1942 - May 1945

Garrison information
- Garrison: 453rd Bombardment Group

Airfield information
Runways
Direction	Length and surface
00/00	Concrete
00/00	Concrete
00/00	Concrete

Royal Air Force Old Buckenham or more simply RAF Old Buckenham is a former Royal Air Force station located 2 miles (3.2 km) south east of Attleborough, Norfolk, England which was used during the Second World War by the United States for the strategic bombing campaign against Germany.

The airfield is in civilian use as Old Buckenham Airport. At the centre of the modern-day airfield is a black granite memorial to the 366 United States Army Air Force (USAAF) servicemen who died serving from the base in the Second World War. The airfield mainly handles General Aviation traffic. A 1941 Boeing Stearman operates from the airfield and a 1943 D Day veteran Piper J-3 Cub is also based at the field. The airfield has adopted a shield carved in wood by a serving USAAF officer at the base during the war as its logo.

== History ==
=== USAAF use ===
Old Buckenham airfield was built during 1942–43 for the USAAF Eighth Air Force. It was given designation USAAF Air Station 144.

==== 453rd Bombardment Group (Heavy) ====
The airfield was opened in late 1943 and was used by the 453rd Bombardment Group (Heavy), arriving from March Field, California on 23 December 1943. The 453d was assigned to the 2nd Combat Bombardment Wing, and the group tail code was a "Circle-J". Its operational squadrons were:

- 732d Bombardment Squadron (E3)
- 733d Bombardment Squadron (F8)
- 734th Bombardment Squadron (E8)
- 735th Bombardment Squadron (H6)

The group flew Consolidated B-24 Liberators as part of the Eighth Air Force's strategic bombing campaign.

The 453d BG entered combat on 5 February 1944 with an attack against an airfield at Tours. Throughout combat, the unit served chiefly as a strategic bombardment organization. Targets included a fuel depot at Dülmen, marshalling yards at Paderborn, aircraft assembly plants at Gotha, railway centres at Hamm, an ordnance depot at Glinde, oil refineries at Gelsenkirchen, chemical works at Leverkusen, an airfield at Neumünster, a canal at Minden, and a railway viaduct at Altenbeken.

The group took part in the concentrated attack against the German aircraft industry during "Big Week", 20–25 February 1944. Besides strategic operations, the group engaged in support and interdiction missions. Bombed V-weapon sites, airfields, and gun batteries in France prior to the invasion of Normandy in June 1944; on 6 June hit shore installations between Le Havre and Cherbourg and other enemy positions farther inland. Attacked enemy troops in support of the Allied breakthrough at Saint-Lô in July. Bombed German communications during the Battle of the Bulge, December 1944-January 1945. Ferried cargo on two occasions: hauled petrol, blankets, and rations to France in September 1944; dropped ammunition, food, and medical supplies near Wesel during the airborne assault across the Rhine in March 1945.

James "Jimmy" Stewart, the Hollywood movie star, was group operations officer at Old Buckenham during the spring of 1944. Stewart's fellow actor Walter Matthau was also based at Old Buckenham.

The 453d Bomb Group flew its last combat mission in April. Initially it was prepared for possible redeployment to the Pacific theatre using Boeing B-29 Superfortresses. However hostilities in Europe had ceased before the group had time to start its movement and it returned to New Castle AAFld, Delaware on 9 May 1945 to be inactivated on 12 September 1945.

=== Air Ministry use ===
In May 1945, Old Buckenham reverted to Air Ministry control and was used as a satellite for maintenance units until being closed on 20 June 1960.

Units

- No. 53 Maintenance Unit RAF
- No. 94 Maintenance Unit RAF
- No. 231 Maintenance Unit RAF

== Current use ==
With the end of military control Old Buckenham has largely been converted back to agriculture with much of the concrete areas being ground into aggregate and being sold in the Norwich area. Today several original buildings and concrete pads remain at the site, the majority of which form part of Old Buckenham Airport an active 126-acre airfield site with one hard runway and two grass strips. Old Buckenham Airfield has recently been sold to an aviation enthusiast, Geoffrey Lynch OBE who has pledged to keep aviation at the site.

In May 1983, during the 2nd Air Division reunion, the 453rd Bomb Group dedicated an extension to the Village Hall at Old Buckenham as a memorial to the members of the group who lost their lives serving in the UK. The room contains various wartime artefacts and memorabilia and a large bronze plaque listing those who are remembered.

== War memorial ==
A large black granite memorial to the 366 USAAF servicemen is at the centre of the modern-day airfield. It is in the form of a tailplane from a Consolidated B-24 Liberator. In October 2012 the stone was moved from its previous location into a specially created memorial garden. Under new airfield management since 2011 an annual Remembrance Sunday service is held which regularly attracts over 400 participants.

== 453rd Bomb Group Museum & 8th Air Force Heritage Gallery ==
In February 2015, it was announced that the airfield has applied for permission to erect a museum at the site. The plans are for the erection of two Nissen Huts, one of which will house items described as having the potential to be the largest collection of 453rd Bomb Group memorabilia in existence.

The 453rd Bombardment Group Museum opened on Remembrance Sunday 2015.

An additional Museum, said to complement the 453rd Museum, was opened on Remembrance Sunday 2017 by United States Navy Captain (United States O-6) Poston, whose Great Uncle served in the 453rd Bombardment Group at RAF Old Buckenham. The new museum covers the wider subject of the Eighth Air Force of which the 453rd were a part.

== See also ==
- List of former Royal Air Force stations
