= 707th Bombardment Squadron =

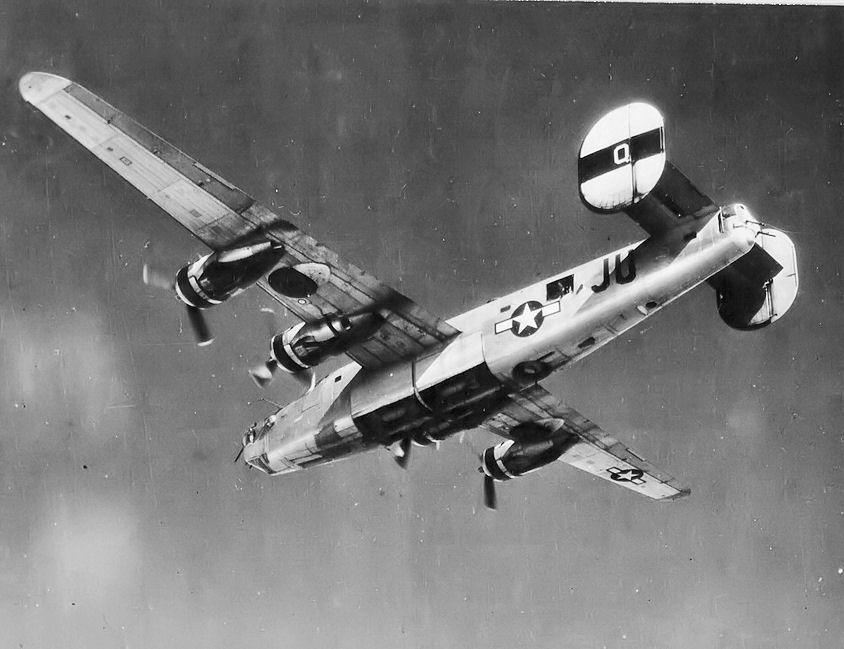
- A squadron B-24J Liberator on the bomb run over Aschaffenburg (Note: Aircraft is Ford Motors built Consolidated B-24J-5-FO, serial 42-50773, Queenie, fuselage code JU-Q. This plane was returned to Albuquerque on 24 September 1945 and later scrapped there. Baugher, Joe (13 May 2023). "1942 USAF Serial Numbers". Joe Baugher. Photo taken on 25 February 1945.)
- Active: 1943–1945; 1948–1950
- Country: United States
- Branch: United States Air Force
- Role: Heavy bomber
- Colors: Black (World War II)
- Engagements: European Theater of World War II

Insignia
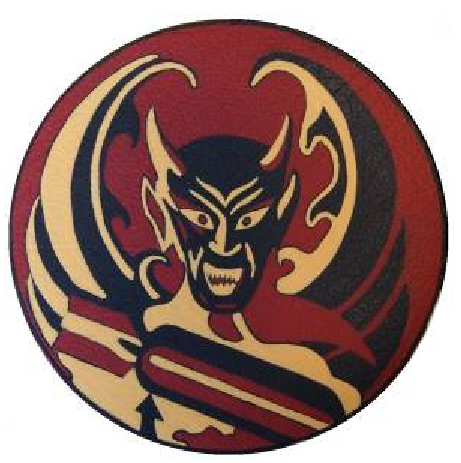
- 707th Bombardment Squadron emblem
- WW II group tail marking: Circle C, later yellow with black stripe
- WW II squadron fuselage code and color: JU

The 707th Bombardment Squadron is an inactive United States Air Force unit. It was last assigned to Twelfth Air Force at Lubbock Air Force Base, Texas, where it was inactivated in March 1950.

The squadron was first activated in 1943. After training in the United States with Consolidated B-24 Liberators, it deployed to the European Theater of Operations, where it engaged in the strategic bombing campaign against Germany. After V-E Day, the squadron returned to the United States and was inactivated. The squadron was activated in the reserve in 1948.

== History ==
=== Training for combat ===
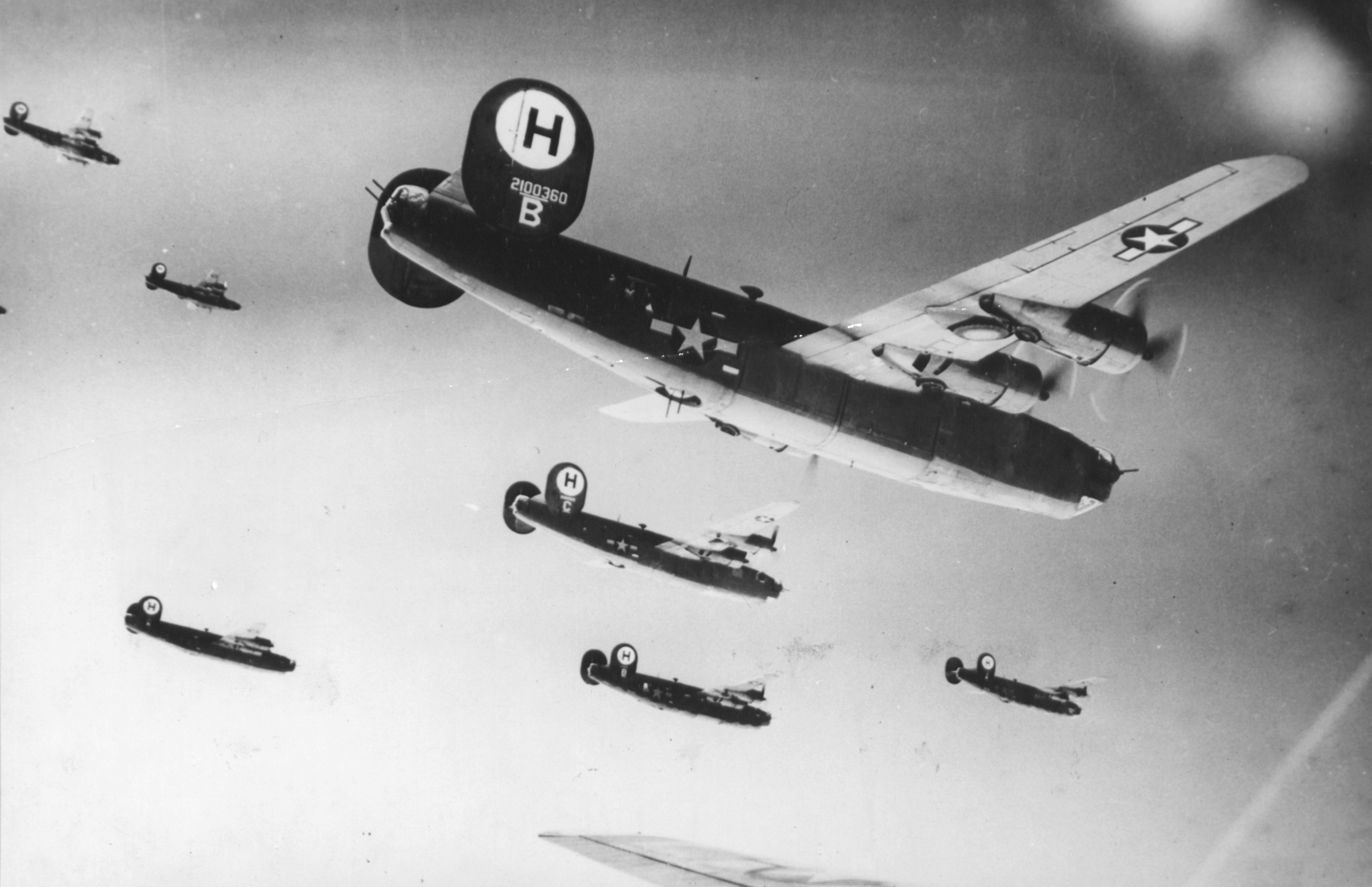
446th Bomb Group Liberators on their way to a target. (Note: Identifiable is Ford Motors built Consolidated B-24H-1-FO Liberator, serial 42-7607, The Spirit of '77. This plane completed the war and returned to the United States. Baugher, Joe (26 April 2023). "1942 USAF Serial Numbers". Joe Baugher.)

The squadron was first activated on 1 April 1943 at Davis-Monthan Field, Arizona as the 707th Bombardment Squadron with an initial cadre drawn from the 39th Bombardment Group. It was one of the original squadrons of the 446th Bombardment Group. The cadre departed for Orlando Army Air Base, Florida for training with the Army Air Forces School of Applied Tactics, where they flew simulated combat missions from Montbrook Army Air Field.

The unit headed for Alamogordo Army Air Field, New Mexico in June 1943, but was diverted to Lowry Field, Colorado, where the squadron was filled out and advanced training was completed. The squadron lost one aircraft during this training. The ground echelon left Lowry on 18 October 1943 for Camp Shanks, New York and embarked on the RMS Queen Mary, sailing on 27 October 1943 and arrived in Greenock on the Firth of Clyde on 2 November 1943. The aircraft left Lowry on 20 October 1943 for staging at Lincoln Army Air Field, Nebraska. The aircrews ferried their planes under the control of Air Transport Command via the southern route from Florida through Puerto Rico, Brazil, Senegal, and Morocco to England. The 707th was part of the first United States Army Air Forces group to complete the Transatlantic hop from Brazil to Africa without the installation of additional bomb bay fuel tanks.

=== Combat in the European Theater ===
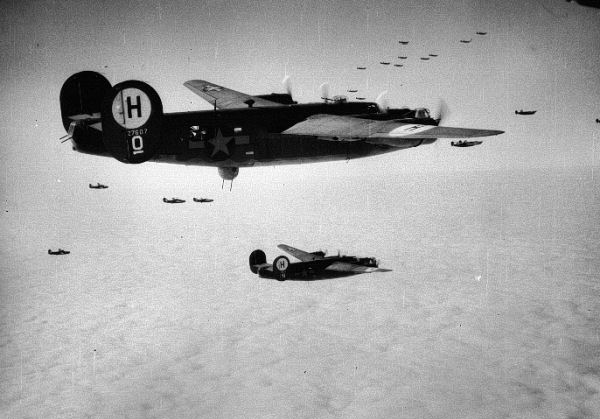
446th Bomb Group Liberators on their way to a target.< (Note: Identifiable is Consolidated B-24J-95-CO Liberator, serial 42-100360. This aircraft was shot down 29 April 1944 by a Bf 109 on a mission to Berlin. Three crew members were killed, seven became prisoners of war. Baugher, Joe (6 May 2023). "1942 USAF Serial Numbers". Joe Baugher. Missing Air Crew Report 4485.)

The squadron arrived at its new base at RAF Flixton in the east of England in early November. The 707th flew its first mission on 16 December 1943 against shipping facilities in Bremen. The unit operated chiefly against strategic objectives. Its targets included U-boat installations at Kiel, the port at Bremen, a chemical plant at Ludwigshafen, ball-bearing works at Berlin, aircraft engine plants at Rostock, aircraft factories at Munich, marshalling yards at Coblenz, motor works at Ulm, and oil refineries at Hamburg.

Besides strategic missions, the 707th often carried out air support and air interdiction operations. It supported Operation Overlord, the invasion of Normandy in June 1944 by attacking strong points, bridges, airfields, transportation, and other targets in France. The squadron aided ground forces at Caen and Saint-Lô during July by hitting bridges, gun batteries, and enemy troops. It dropped supplies to Allied troops near Nijmegen during Operation Market-Garden in September. The unit bombed marshalling yards, bridges, and road junctions during the Battle of the Bulge in December 1944 and January 1945. It flew low level missions to drop medical supplies, arms, and food to airborne and ground troops near Wesel during Operation Varsity in March 1945. The 707th flew its last combat mission on 25 April, attacking a bridge near Salzburg, Austria.

After V-E Day, the 707th flew transport missions to France, sometimes landing at fields that had been targets the previous year. It also flew "Trolley" missions, transporting support personnel for "sightseeing" trips over Germany to view the results of their efforts. The squadron began to redeploy to the US in June 1945. The first aircraft of the air echelon departed the United Kingdom in mid-June 1945 flying the northern route via Iceland. The ground echelon sailed from Greenock on the Queen Mary on the sixth of July 1945 and arrived in New York on 11 July 1945. Personnel were given 30 days leave. The ground and air echelons reassembled at Sioux Falls Army Air Field, South Dakota in late July, but it was inactivated on 28 August 1945.

=== Reserve operations ===
The 707th Bombardment Squadron was activated again under Air Defense Command (ADC) in the reserves in April 1948 at Lubbock Air Force Base, Texas. Shortly after the squadron was activated, in July 1948, Continental Air Command (ConAC) assumed reserve training responsibility for reserve and Air National Guard units from ADC. It was nominally a Boeing B-29 Superfortress very heavy bombardment squadron, although it is not certain that it was equipped or fully manned. Its group headquarters was located at Carswell Air Force Base, when the group became a corollary of the active duty 7th Bombardment Wing in July 1949, and the squadron was reassigned directly to Twelfth Air Force. (Note: Corollary units were introduced into the reserve program in 1949 and were integrated with regular units on the same station. Cantwell, p. 73) President Truman’s reduced 1949 defense budget required reductions in the number of units in the Air Force, as a result, the 707th was inactivated in March 1950.

== Lineage ==
- Constituted as the 707th Bombardment Squadron (Heavy) on 20 March 1943

Activated on 1 April 1943
Redesignated 707th Bombardment Squadron, Heavy on 20 August 1943
Inactivated on 28 August 1945

- Redesignated 707th Bombardment Squadron, Very Heavy on 7 April 1948

Activated in the reserve on 22 April 1948
Inactivated on 28 March 1950

=== Assignments ===
- 446th Bombardment Group, 1 April 1943 – 28 August 1945
- 446th Bombardment Group, 22 April 1948
- Twelfth Air Force, 27 June 1949 – 28 March 1950

=== Stations ===
- Davis-Monthan Field, Arizona, 1 April 1943
- Lowry Field, Colorado, 8 June 1943 – c. 24 October 1943
- RAF Flixton (AAF-125), England, 4 November 1943 – 5 July 1945
- Sioux Falls Army Air Field, South Dakota, 15 Jul 1945 – 28 August 1945
- Lubbock Air Force Base, Texas, 22 April 1948 – 28 March 1950

=== Aircraft ===
- Consolidated B-24 Liberator, 1943–1945

=== Campaigns ===
Campaign Streamer	Campaign	Dates	Notes
	Air Offensive, Europe	4 November 1943 – 5 June 1944	
	Normandy	6 June 1944 – 24 July 1944	
	Northern France	25 July 1944 – 14 September 1944	
	Rhineland	15 September 1944 – 21 March 1945	
	Central Europe	22 March 1944 – 21 May 1945	
	Ardennes-Alsace	16 December 1944 – 25 January 1945	
