= Glinde, Saxony-Anhalt =

Glinde
- Stadtteil of Barby
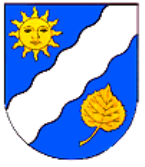
- Coat of arms
- Interactive map of Glinde
- Location within Germany Location within Saxony-Anhalt
- Coordinates: 52°00′47″N 11°50′59″E
- Country: Germany
- State: Saxony-Anhalt
- District: Salzlandkreis
- Town: Barby

Area
  - Total: 4.59 km^{2} (1.77 sq mi)
- Elevation: 49 m (161 ft)

Population (2006-12-31)
  - Total: 278
  - Density: 60.6/km^{2} (157/sq mi)
- Time zone: UTC+01:00 (CET)
  - Summer (DST): UTC+02:00 (CEST)
- Postal codes: 39249
- Dialling codes: 039298

Glinde (German pronunciation: [ˈɡlɪndə]) is a village and a former municipality in the district Salzlandkreis, in Saxony-Anhalt, Germany.

Since 1 January 2010, it is part of the town Barby.
