= Altenbeken =

- Municipality
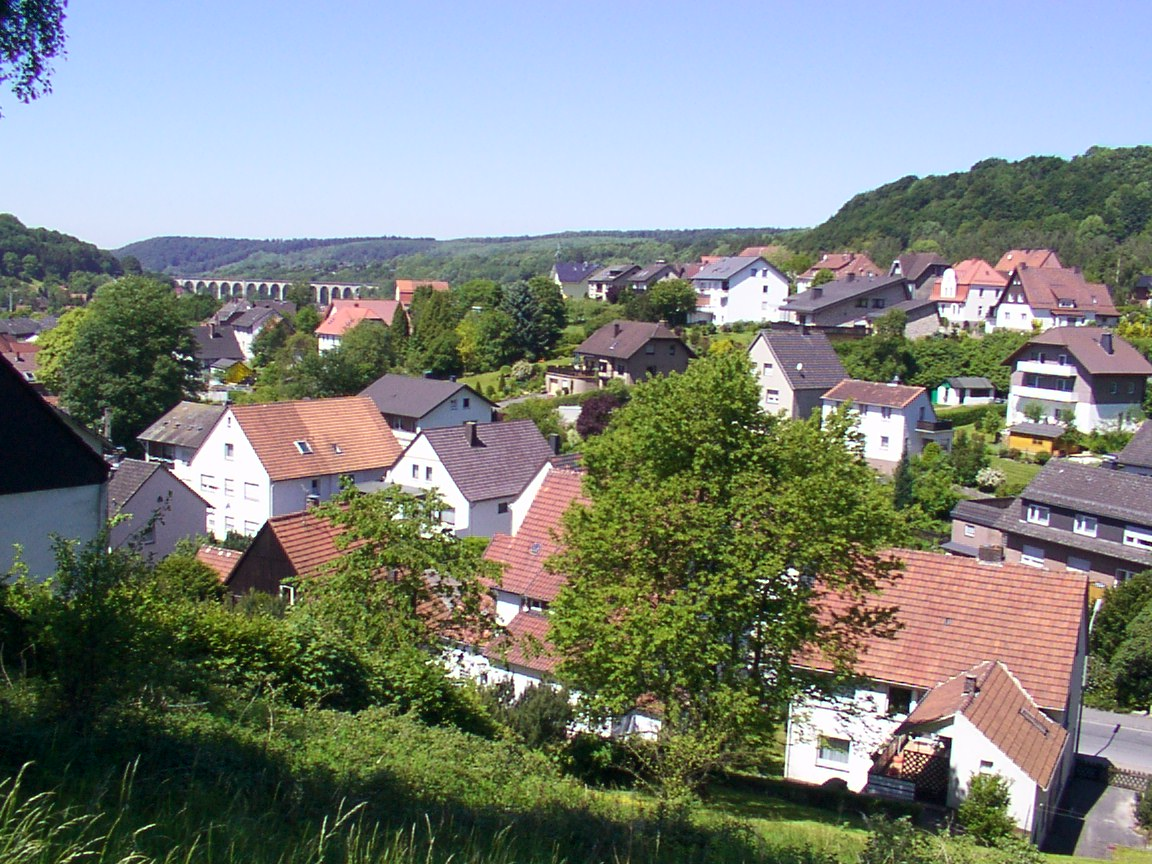
- View of Altenbeken

- Coat of arms

- Location of Altenbeken within Paderborn district
- Interactive map of Altenbeken
- Location within Germany Location within North Rhine-Westphalia
- Coordinates: 51°46′N 8°56′E
- Country: Germany
- State: North Rhine-Westphalia
- Admin. region: Detmold
- District: Paderborn
- Subdivisions: 3

Government
  - Mayor (2025–30): Matthias Möllers (CDU)

Area
  - Total: 76.22 km^{2} (29.43 sq mi)
- Elevation: 250 m (820 ft)

Population (2025-12-31)
  - Total: 9,073
  - Density: 119.0/km^{2} (308.3/sq mi)
- Time zone: UTC+01:00 (CET)
  - Summer (DST): UTC+02:00 (CEST)
- Postal codes: 33182–33184
- Dialling codes: 0 52 55
- Vehicle registration: PB
- Website: www.altenbeken.de

Altenbeken (German pronunciation: [ˈaltn̩ˌbeːkn̩], lit. 'Old Beken', in contrast to "New Beken") is a municipality in the district of Paderborn, in North Rhine-Westphalia, Germany.

== Geography ==
Altenbeken is situated in the Eggegebirge, approx. 15 kilometres (9.3 miles) northeast of Paderborn. To the west of the town is the Altenbeken Viaduct, a railway bridge that spans the Beke valley.

== Population ==
Historical population

Year	Pop.	±% p.a.
1965	5,847	—
1970	6,163	+1.06%
1975	6,312	+0.48%
1980	6,561	+0.78%
1985	6,880	+0.95%
1990	7,632	+2.10%
1995	8,571	+2.35%

Year	Pop.	±% p.a.
2000	9,588	+2.27%
2005	9,636	+0.10%
2010	9,269	−0.77%
2015	9,294	+0.05%
2020	9,105	−0.41%
2025	9,073	−0.07%

Source: Landesdatabank Nordrhein-Westfalen

== Politics ==
The current mayor is Matthias Möllers of the CDU who has been serving since 2020. In the 2025 local elections he was reelected with 50,75 % of the votes in the runoff election.

=== City council ===
After the 2025 elections, the Altenbeken city council is composed as follows:

Party	Votes	%	+/-	Seats	+/-
Christian Democratic Union (CDU)	2,637	60.5	▲10.3	17	▲2
Social Democratic Party (SPD)	1,164	26.7	▲1.3	7	±0
Alliance 90/The Greens (Grüne)	556	12.8	▼3.1	4	±0
Valid votes	4,357	94.5			
Invalid votes	256	5.6			
Total	4,613	100.0		28	±0
Electorate/voter turnout	7,163	64.4			
Source: City of Altenbeken

=== Division of the municipality ===
Altenbeken consists of the following 3 districts

- Altenbeken
- Buke
- Schwaney

=== Viadukt Festival ===
Video from Viadukt-Festival in 2007

Since 2003, the railway and cultural festival Vivat Viadukt has taken place every two years in Altenbeken.

=== International relations ===
Altenbeken is twinned with:

- Betton (near Rennes), (France)
