= 93rd Operations Group =

93d Operations Group
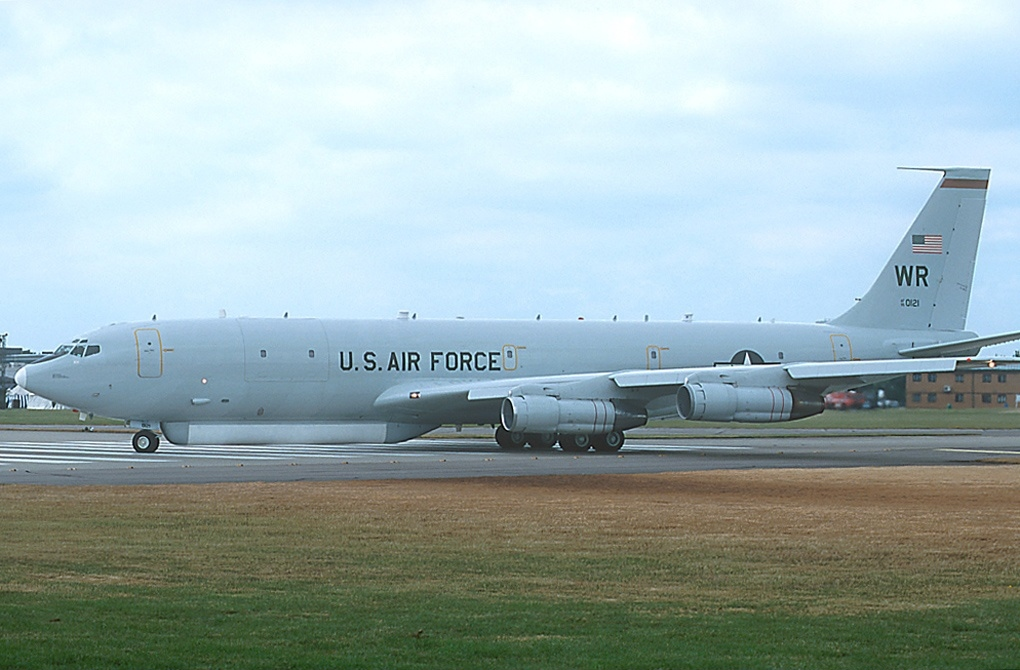
- Wing E-8 J-STARS aircraft
- Active: 1942–1952; 1991–1995; 1996–2002
- Country: United States
- Branch: United States Air Force
- Role: Air control
- Nickname: Traveling Circus (World War II) Blaze
- Decorations: Distinguished Unit Citation

Insignia
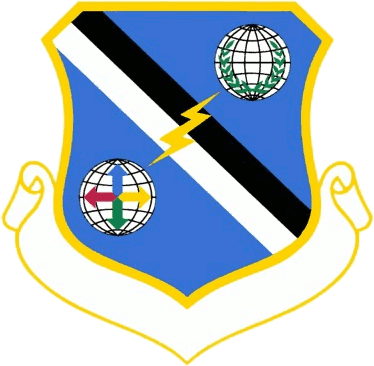
- 93d Operations Group emblem (Note: The group uses the wing emblem with the group designation on the scroll. Air Force Instruction 84-105, Organizational Lineage, Honors and Heraldry, 19 March 2013, para 3.3.3)

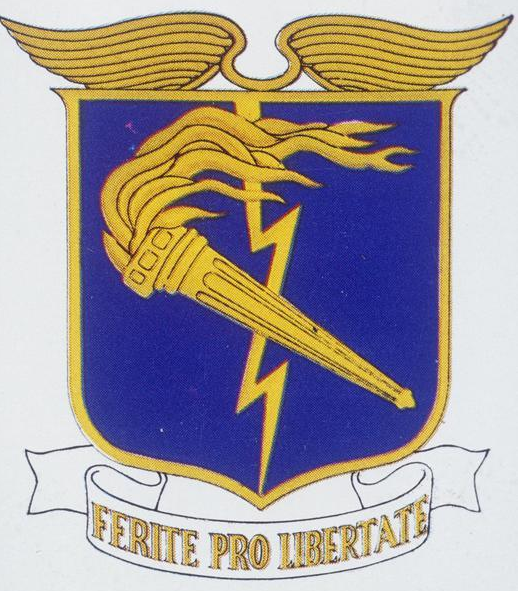
- 93d Bombardment Group emblem

The 93rd Operations Group is an inactive United States Air Force unit. Its last assignment was with the 93rd Air Control Wing, stationed at Robins Air Force Base, Georgia. The unit was inactivated on 1 October 2002.

During World War II, the group's predecessor unit, the 93rd Bombardment Group was the first VIII Bomber Command Consolidated B-24 Liberator group to bomb targets in Occupied Europe and Nazi Germany. It flew from RAF Alconbury in Cambridgeshire. The group became operational with a mission over Occupied France on 9 October 1942.

In the postwar era, the 93rd Bombardment Group was one of the original ten USAAF bombardment groups assigned to Strategic Air Command on 21 March 1946. Equipped with low-hour Boeing B-29 Superfortress surplus World War II aircraft, the group deployed to Far East Air Forces during the early part of the Korean War, and flew combat missions over Korea. The group was inactivated in 1952 when the parent wing adopted the dual deputy organization and assigned all of the group's squadrons directly to the wing.

It was reactivated as the 93rd Operations Group in 1991 when the wing adopted the USAF objective organization.

== History ==
For related history and lineage, see 93rd Air-Ground Operations Wing

=== World War II ===
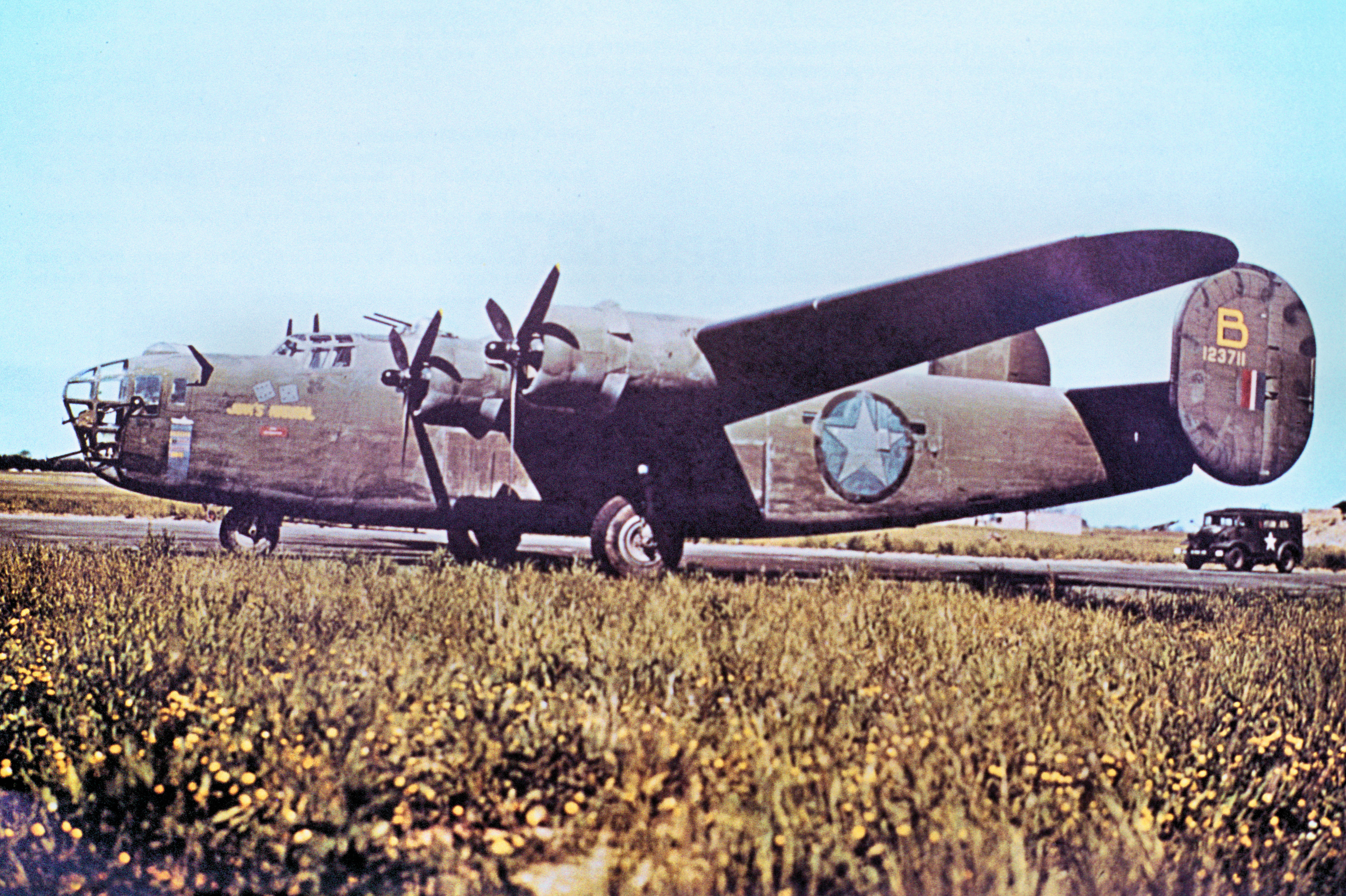
328th Bomb Squadron Consolidated B-24D-1-CO Liberator Serial 41-23711 "'Jerks Natural". This aircraft was lost over Austria 1 October 1943. MACR 3301

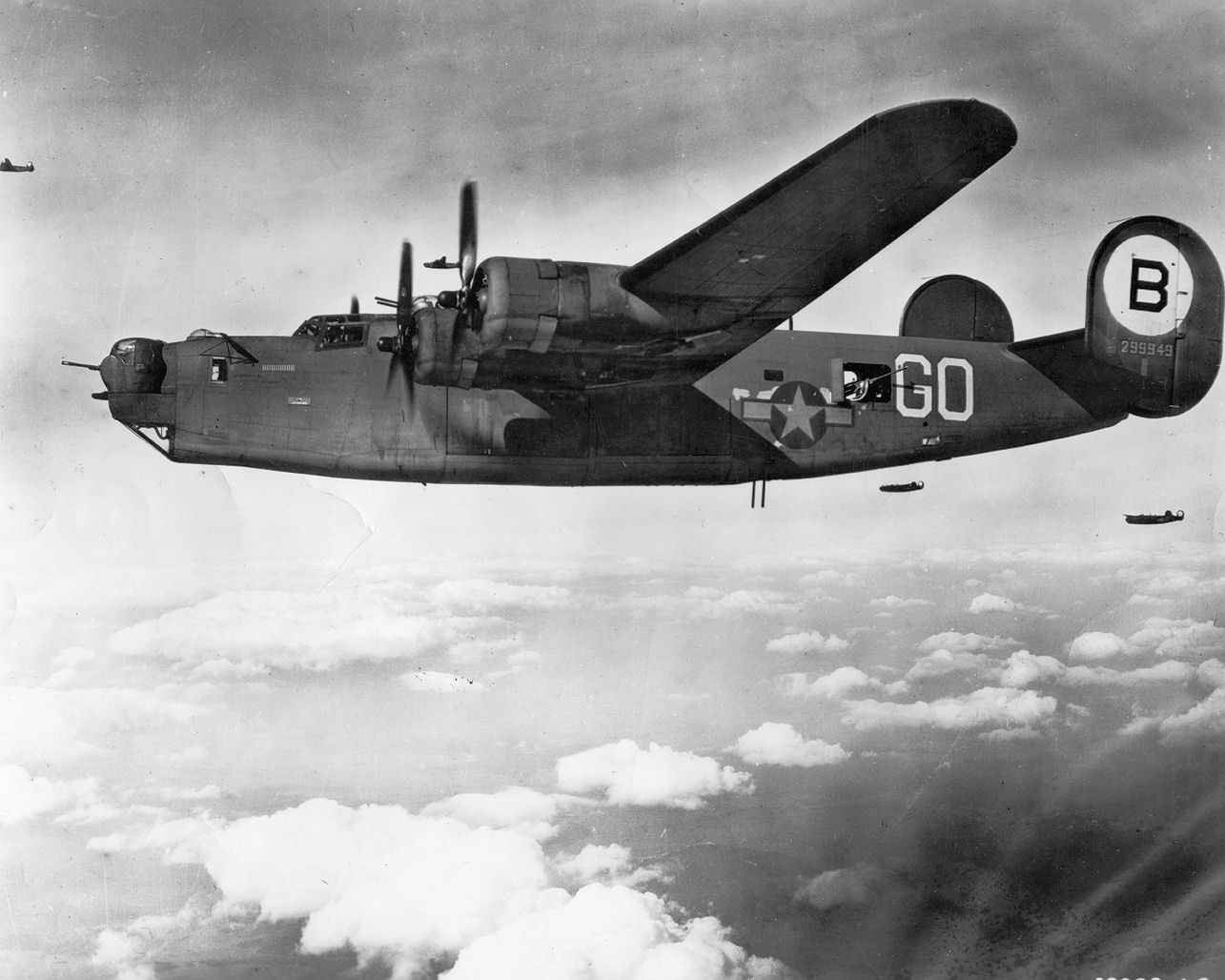
328th Bomb Squadron Consolidated B-24J-55-CO Liberator Serial 42-99949 on a mission to Friedrichshafen Germany during August 1944. This aircraft was lost over Belgium on 21 September 1944, MACR 9662

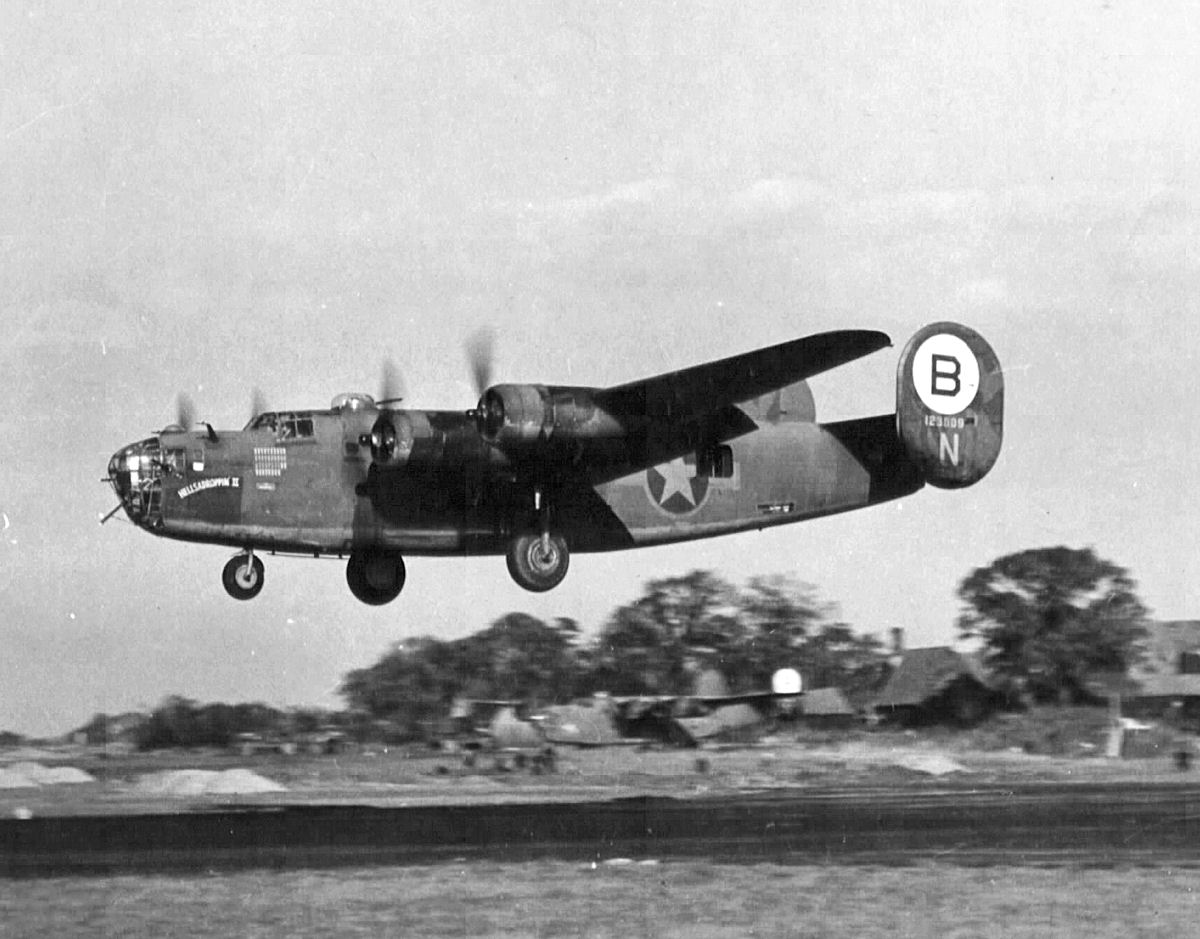
329th Bomb Squadron B-24D-5-CO 41-23809 "Hellsadroppin' II", landing at RAF Hardwick 21 December 1943. This plane was declared 'War Weary' and transferred to the 448th Bomb Group to be used as its formation assembly ship and was carried three different names during its time there and was painted with a black and yellow checkerboard pattern over the whole plane. Photo taken 15 December 1943. She was condemned as salvage on Jan. 15,1945.

The 93rd Bombardment Group was activated on 1 March 1942. It initially prepared for combat with Consolidated B-24 Liberators. Engaged in antisubmarine operations over the Gulf of Mexico and the Caribbean Sea as part of the III Bomber Command, May– July 1942.

The group moved to England, August– September 1942, and was assigned to Eighth Air Force. It was assigned to the 2d Combat Bombardment Wing. The group flew its B-24 Liberator aircraft with a tail code of "Circle B". The 93rd was the first Liberator-equipped bomber group to reach the Eighth Air Force. The group became operational with the B-24 on 9 October 1942 by attacking steel and engineering works at Lille France. Until December, the group operated primarily against submarine pens along the French coast along the Bay of Biscay.

While the 93rd was at RAF Alconbury, His Majesty, King George VI paid his first visit to an Eighth Air Force base on 13 November 1942. During the visit, he was shown the B-24 "Teggie Ann", then considered to be the 93rd's leading aircraft.

On 6 December 1942 most of the group was transferred to Twelfth Air Force in North Africa to support the Operation Torch landings. The group receiving a Distinguished Unit Citation for operations in that theatre, December 1942 – February 1943, when, with inadequate supplies and under the most difficult desert conditions, the detachment struck heavy blows at enemy shipping and communications. The detachment returned to England in February 1943, where its personnel were featured on the cover of the 26 July 1943 issue of Life Magazine and the unit dubbed "Ted's Traveling Circus" after its first commander, Col. Edward J. Timberlake.

The balance of the 93rd BG was moved to RAF Hardwick (Station 104), in Norfolk where B-24 groups were being concentrated. From February 1943 and until the end of June the group bombed engine repair works, harbors, power plants, and other targets in France, the Low Countries, and Germany.

A detachment returned to the Mediterranean theatre during June and July 1943 to support the Allied invasion of Sicily and to participate in the famous low-level attack on enemy oil installations at Ploesti on 1 August. Having followed another element of the formation along the wrong course to Ploesti, the 93rd hit targets that had been assigned to other groups, but it carried out its bombing of the vital oil installations despite heavy losses inflicted by attacks from the fully alerted enemy and was awarded a Distinguished Unit Citation for the operation.

After the detachment returned to England in August 1943, the group flew only two missions before the detachment was sent back to the Mediterranean to support the Fifth Army at Salerno during the invasion of Italy in September 1943.

The detachment rejoined the group in October 1943, and until April 1945 the 93rd concentrated on bombardment of strategic targets such as marshalling yards, aircraft factories, oil refineries, chemical plants, and cities in Germany. In addition it bombed gun emplacements, choke points, and bridges near Cherbourg-en-Cotentin during the Normandy invasion in June 1944. It attacked troop concentrations in northern France during the Saint-Lô breakthrough in July 1944; transported food, gasoline, water, and other supplies to the Allies advancing across France, August – September 1944; dropped supplies to airborne troops in the Netherlands on 18 September 1944; struck enemy transportation and other targets during the Battle of the Bulge, December 1944 – January 1945; and flew two missions on 24 March 1945 during the airborne assault across the Rhine, dropping supplies to troops near Wesel and bombing a night-fighter base at Stormede.

The 93rd Bombardment Group ceased combat operations in April 1945, and returned to Sioux Falls Army Air Field South Dakota during May/June for B-29 Superfortress transition training, prior to deployment to the Pacific Theater. However, the deployment never took place as the war in the Pacific ended. The group was demobilized and was eventually inactivated in December 1945.

=== Strategic Air Command ===
The 93rd Bombardment Group (Very Heavy) was activated at Merced Field, California on 21 June 1946 which was assigned to Merced for Boeing B-29 Superfortress training. The 93rd was one of SAC's first ten bomb groups. There were three initial operational squadrons (328th, 329th, and 330th Bombardment Squadrons) which absorbed the equipment and aircraft of the inactivated 444th Bombardment Group.

On 1 October 1946 the airfield was put on "minimal operations on caretaker status", with control of the facility under Colorado Springs AAF. The 93rd Bomb Group, however remained active. It, along with the 509th Composite Group at Roswell Army Air Field, New Mexico, was all there was of Strategic Air Command at that time. The airfield remained in this status until 1 May 1947 when it was reactivated.

On 1 May 1947, Merced Army Air Field was reactivated under Strategic Air Command. On 28 July 1947, the group became the 93rd Bombardment Wing, Very Heavy and took host unit responsibility from the group as part of the Wing Base organization plan. During 1947–1948, it flew Boeing B-29 Superfortresses, but soon received the upgraded version of the B-29, the Boeing B-50A Superfortress. In 1948, the entire group deployed to Kadena Air Base, Okinawa, becoming the first Strategic Air Command bomb group to deploy in full strength to the Far East.

Upon its return to Castle in 1951, the group was re-equipped with B-50s. In June 1952 the group was inactivated when Strategic Air Command reorganized its wings into the dual deputate system.

=== Reactivation ===
On 1 September 1991, the 93rd Bombardment Wing was redesignated as the 93rd Wing under the "Objective Wing" concept adopted by the Air Force. The flying components of the wing were reassigned to the newly renamed 93rd Operations Group.

As part of their new mission, the 93rd Group also gained the Boeing B-52 Stratofortress squadrons from the 93rd Wing. However, the operations of the reestablished group was short, On 1 June 1992 the 93rd was relieved from assignment to SAC and was reassigned to the newly formed Air Combat Command (ACC). Its B-52G aircraft given the ACC tail code of "CA" and carried blue tail stripes. The 328th Bomb Squadron was inactivated 3 May 1994, and the wing and group were placed on non-operational status. The group was inactivated on 31 October 1994.

Just four months later, however, it was reactivated as the operational arm of the 93rd Air Control Wing and was reactivated at Robins Air Force Base, Georgia on 29 January 1996. It was equipped with the Boeing E-8 Joint STARS and it accepted its first production aircraft on 11 June 1996.

Some crews and aircraft deployed from Robins to Bosnia-Herzegovina in 1996 to support the Operation Joint Endeavor peacekeeping operation. Deployed to Southwest Asia in response to Iraq's refusal to cooperate with United Nations weapons inspectors, 18 February – 3 June 1998. Between 23 February – 28 June 1999, deployed aircraft and personnel to Ramstein Air Base, Germany to assist in monitoring Serbian withdrawal from Kosovo.

Upon inactivation on 1 October 2002; Georgia Air National Guard's 116th Air Control Wing assumed command responsibility for JSTARS mission.

== Lineage ==
- Constituted as the 93rd Bombardment Group (Heavy) on 28 January 1942

Activated on 1 March 1942
Redesignated 93rd Bombardment Group, Heavy in c. 20 August 1943
Redesignated 93rd Bombardment Group, Very Heavy c. 6 July 1945
Redesignated 93rd Bombardment Group, Medium c. 28 May 1948
Inactivated on 16 June 1952

- Redesignated 93rd Operations Group on 28 August 1991

Activated on 1 September 1991
Inactivated on 31 October 1994

- Activated on 29 January 1996

Inactivated on 1 October 2002

=== Assignments ===
- III Bomber Command, 1 March-2 August 1942
- 1st Bombardment Wing, 6 September 1942
- 2d Bombardment Wing, 6 December 1942

Attached to: 201st Provisional Combat Bombardment Wing, 25 March-13 December 1943
20th Combat Bombardment Wing, 13 September 1943 – 12 June 1945

- Second Air Force, June 1945
- Strategic Air Command, 21 March 1946
- Fifteenth Air Force, 21 June 1946
- 93rd Bombardment Wing, 28 July 1947 – 15 June 1952 (detached to Far East Air Forces, 15 May-25 August 1948, Far East Air Forces Bomber Command, 15 July 1950 – 30 January 1951, not operational after 10 February 1951)
- 93rd Wing (later 93rd Bomb Wing), 1 September 1991 – 31 October 1994
- 93rd Air Control Wing, 29 January 1996 – 1 October 2002

=== Components ===
- 12th Airborne Command and Control Squadron: 29 January 1996 – 1 October 2002
- 16th Airborne Command and Control Squadron: 29 January 1996 – 1 October 2002
- 93rd Training Squadron: 29 January 1996 – 1 October 2002
- 328th Bombardment Squadron: 1 March 1942 – 15 June 1952; 1 September 1991 – 31 October 1994
- 329th Bombardment Squadron: 1 March 1942 – 15 June 1952
- 330th Bombardment Squadron: 1 March 1942 – 15 June 1952
- 409th Bombardment Squadron: 1 March 1942 – 6 July 1945; 20 August 1945 – 6 May 1946
- 924th Air Refueling Squadron: 1 September 1991 – 31 October 1994

=== Stations ===
- Barksdale Field, Louisiana, 1 March 1942
- Fort Myers Army Air Field, Florida, 15 May-2 August 1942
- RAF Alconbury (USAAF Station 102), England, 7 September 1942
- RAF Hardwick (USAAF Station 104), England, 6 December 1942 – 19 May 1945
- Sioux Falls Army Air Field, South Dakota, June 1945
- Pratt Army Air Field, Kansas, 24 July 1945
- Clovis Army Air Field, New Mexico, 13 December 1945
- Merced Army Air Field (later Castle Field, Castle Air Force Base), California, 21 June 1946 – 16 June 1952 (deployed to Kadena Air Base, Okinawa, 15 May-25 August 1948)
- Castle Air Force Base, California, 1 September 1991 – 30 June 1995
- Robins Air Force Base, Georgia, 29 January 1996 – 1 October 2002

=== Aircraft ===
- Consolidated B-24D/H/J/L/M Liberator, 1942–1945, 15 May-25 August 1948,
- Boeing B-29 Superfortress, 1945–1949; 1950–1951, 15 May-25 August 1948,
- Boeing B-50 Superfortress, 1949–1950; 1950–1952, 15 May-25 August 1948,
- Boeing B-52G Stratofortress, 1991–1994
- Boeing E-8 Joint STARS, 1996–2002
