= 20th Bombardment Wing =

- Active: 1940–1941; 1942–1946
- Country: United States
- Branch: United States Army; United States Air Force
- Role: Command of Bombardment units
- Engagements: European Theater of World War II

The 20th Bombardment Wing is a disbanded United States Air Force unit. Its last assignment was with Eighth Air Force at MacDill Field, Florida, where it was inactivated on 10 November 1946. It was later disbanded in October 1948

== History ==
The 20th Bombardment Wing was activated in December 1940 at Fort Douglas, Utah and assigned to Second Air Force. The following month, it was assigned its combat elements, the 7th and 42d Bombardment Groups. In September 1941, the wing was inactivated and its personnel used to form the 2nd Air Support Command.

Moved to England, May–June 1943, for duty with Eighth Air Force. Received its first groups in November 1943 and served in combat in the European theater from December 1943 until April 1945.

Returned to the US in August 1945 and prepared for Boeing B-29 Superfortress operations, although had no combat components assigned. Reassigned to Strategic Air Command postwar Eighth Air Force in May 1946 and elevated to VIII Bombardment Command. Inactivated before becoming operational in November 1946.

== Lineage ==
- Constituted as the 20th Bombardment Wing on 19 October 1940

Activated on 18 December 1940
Inactivated on 1 September 1941

- Activated on 1 November 1942

Redesignated 20th Bombardment Wing (Heavy) in February 1943
Redesignated 20th Combat Bombardment Wing (Heavy) in August 1943
Redesignated 20th Bombardment Wing (Heavy)' on 20 June 1945
Redesignated 20th Bombardment Wing (Very Heavy) in August 1945
Redesignated VIII Bomber Command (Very Heavy) in October 1945
Inactivated on 10 November 1946
Disbanded on 8 October 1948

=== Assignments ===
- Second Air Force, 18 December 1940 – 1 December 1941
- Third Air Force, November 1942 – 8 May 1943
- VIII Bomber Command (later Eighth Air Force), 1 July 1943 – 6 August 1945
- Continental Air Forces, 15 August 1945
- Eighth Air Force, 14 May – 10 November 1946

=== Units assigned ===
- 7th Bombardment Group: 16 January – 5 September 1941
- 34th Bombardment Group: 18 June – 28 August 1945
- 42d Bombardment Group: 16 January – 1 September 1941
- 93d Bombardment Group: 13 September 1943 – 12 June 1945
- 385th Bombardment Group: 18 June – 4 August 1945
- 388th Bombardment Group: 18 June – 13 August 1945
- 446th Bombardment Group: November 1943 – 1 June 1945
- 448th Bombardment Group: 30 November 1943 – 6 July 1945
- 452d Bombardment Group: 18 June – 12 August 1945
- 489th Bombardment Group: 14 August – 29 November 1944

=== Stations ===
- Fort Douglas, Utah, 18 December 1940 – 1 September 1941
- MacDill Field, Florida, November 1942 – c. 8 May 1943
- Camp Lynn (AAF-101), England, c. 9 June 1943
- RAF Cheddington (AAF-113), England, c. 1 July 1943
- RAF Horsham St Faith (AAF-123), England, c. 14 September 1943
- RAF Hethel (AAF-114), England, 24 September 1943
- RAF Hardwick (AAF-104), England, c. 7 November 1943
- RAF Snetterton Heath (AAF-138), England, c. 13 June – 6 August 1945
- Sioux Falls Army Air Field, South Dakota, c. 15 August 1945
- Peterson Field, Colorado, 17 August 1945
- MacDill Field, Florida, 14 May – 10 November 1946
