= 330th Combat Training Squadron =

330th Combat Training Squadron

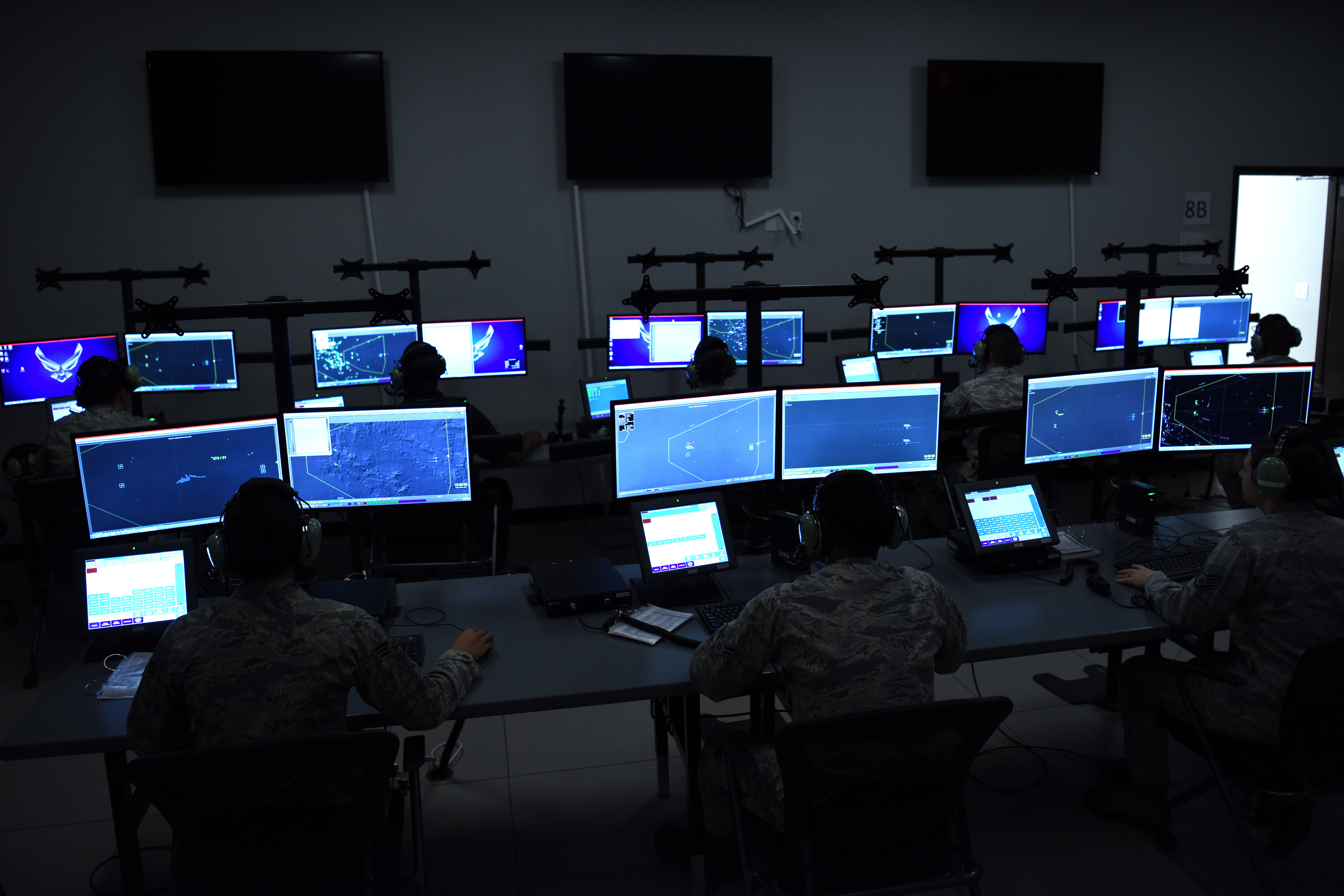
- Students train to become BCC Battle Management Operations Specialists at Robins AFB
- Active: 1942–1963; 1988–1994; 2002–present
- Country: United States
- Branch: United States Air Force
- Role: Training for battle management command and control
- Part of: Air Combat Command
- Garrison/HQ: Robins Air Force Base
- Motto: Prognatus Caligo Lumen (Latin for 'Light Born from Darkness')
- Engagements: European Theater of Operations; Mediterranean Theater of Operations
- Decorations: Distinguished Unit Citation; Air Force Meritorious Unit Award; Air Force Outstanding Unit Award

Commanders
- Current commander: Lt Col Joshua "Bubba" Albritton(as of 4 February 2025)

Insignia
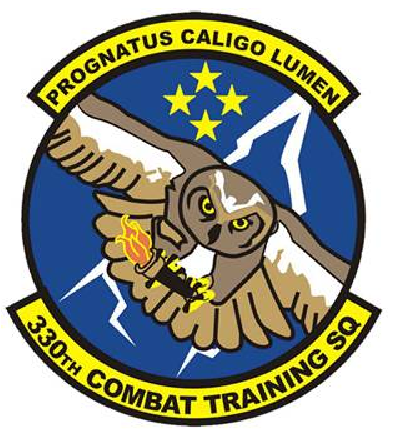
- 330th Combat Training Squadron emblem

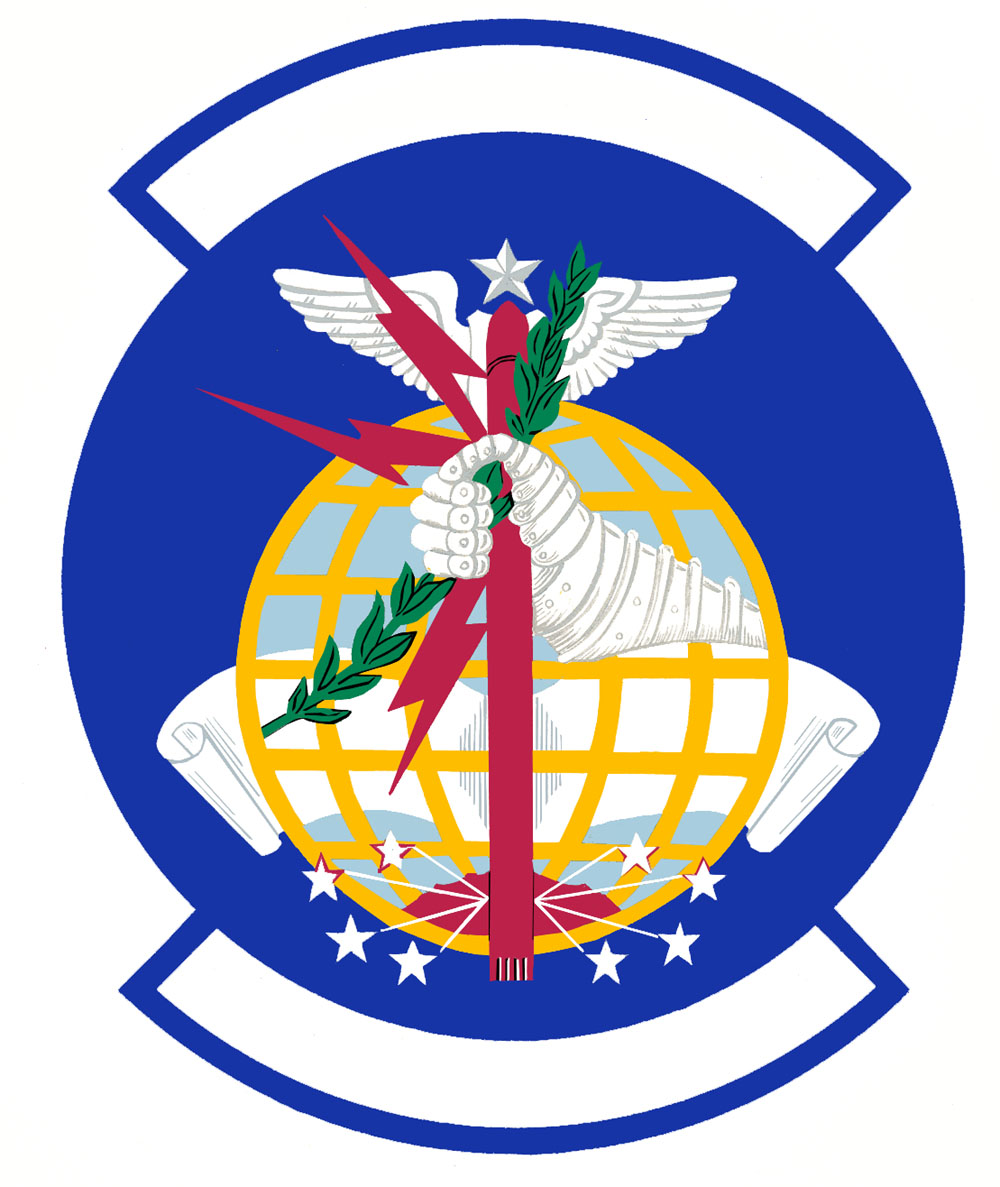
- 330th Combat Flight Instructor Training Squadron emblem (Note: Approved 12 May 1989.)

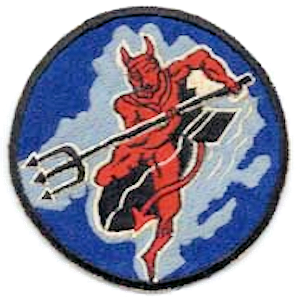
- 330th Bombardment Squadron emblem (SAC era)

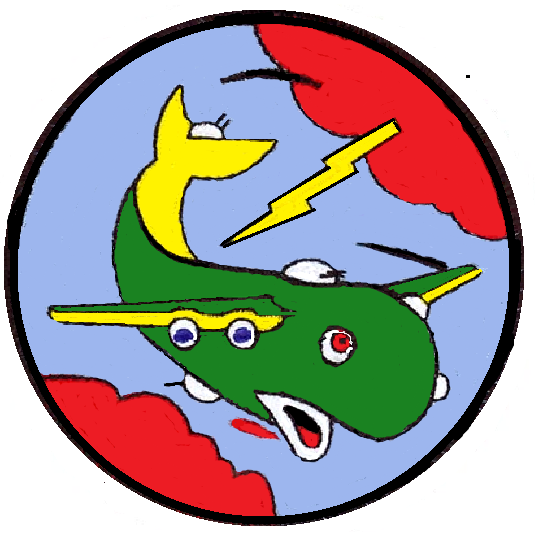
- 330th Bombardment Squadron emblem (Late World War II) (Note: In May 1944, the 93rd Bombardment Group adopted yellow tails as a unit marking. The squadron changed the color of the whale's tail to match.)

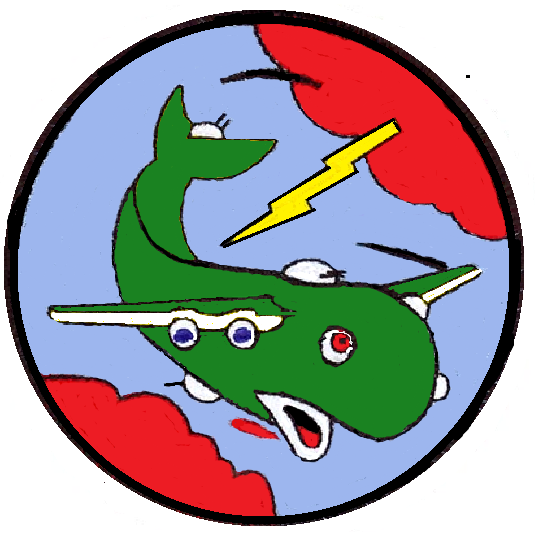
- 330th Bombardment Squadron emblem (Early World War II)
- World War II fuselage code: AG

The 330th Combat Training Squadron is a United States Air Force unit assigned to the 461st Air Control Wing based at Robins Air Force Base, Georgia, where it conducts training for Battle Control Centers.

The squadron was first activated as the 330th Bombardment Squadron in 1942 and trained with Consolidated B-24 Liberator heavy bombers. During training, it also flew antisubmarine patrols over the Gulf of Mexico. It was one of the first bomber units to deploy to the European Theater of Operations, to participate in the strategic bombing campaign against Germany. In 1942 and 1943, its air echelon moved to reinforce the bomber force in the Mediterranean Theater of Operations, where it earned two Distinguished Unit Citations, including one for its participation in Operation Tidal Wave. Following V-E Day, the squadron returned to the United States to retrain as a Boeing B-29 Superfortress unit.

In 1946, the squadron moved to Castle Field, California. It trained for bomber operations until 1957, when it became a Boeing B-52 Stratofortress aircrew training unit until inactivating in 1963. It was reactivated at Castle in 1988 as the 330th Combat Flight Instructor Squadron, conducting Strategic Air Command's Instructor Pilot School until inactivating in 1994. In 2002, it was activated at Robins Air Force Base, Georgia as the 330th Combat Training Squadron. It conducted aircrew training on the Boeing E-8 Joint STARS until 2023, when it assumed its current mission.

== Mission ==
Since April 2023, the squadron has been tasked to be the Formal Training Unit for the Tactical Operations Center-Fixed (now the Battle Control Center (BCC). It shares this task with the 129th Combat Training Squadron of the Georgia Air National Guard. Course duration ranges from 28 to 44 training days, and additional training courses are currently in development to integrate intelligence and cyber professionals into the BCC.

== History ==
=== World War II ===
==== Initial organization and training in the US ====
The squadron was activated at Barksdale Field, Louisiana in March 1942 as one of the original four squadrons of the 93rd Bombardment Group. It began Phase I (Note: Phase I training concentrated on individual training in crewmember specialties. Later phases concentrated on crew coordination and operation as a unit. Greer, p. 606.) training conducted by the 44th Bombardment Group with Consolidated B-24 Liberators at Barksdale, then moved to Page Field, Florida for final training, preparing to deploy to the European Theater of Operations. From Page, the squadron also flew antisubmarine patrols over the Gulf of Mexico and the Caribbean Sea until July, when it began preparing for movement to England. The squadron moved to Fort Dix, New Jersey on 2 August. The ground echelon sailed for England on 15 August aboard the RMS Queen Elizabeth, while the air echelon moved to Grenier Field, New Hampshire, where they received new B-24s, which they ferried across the Atlantic. Rather than flying their ships across individually, the squadrons of the 93rd Group were the first to make the crossing in formation.

==== Combat in Europe ====
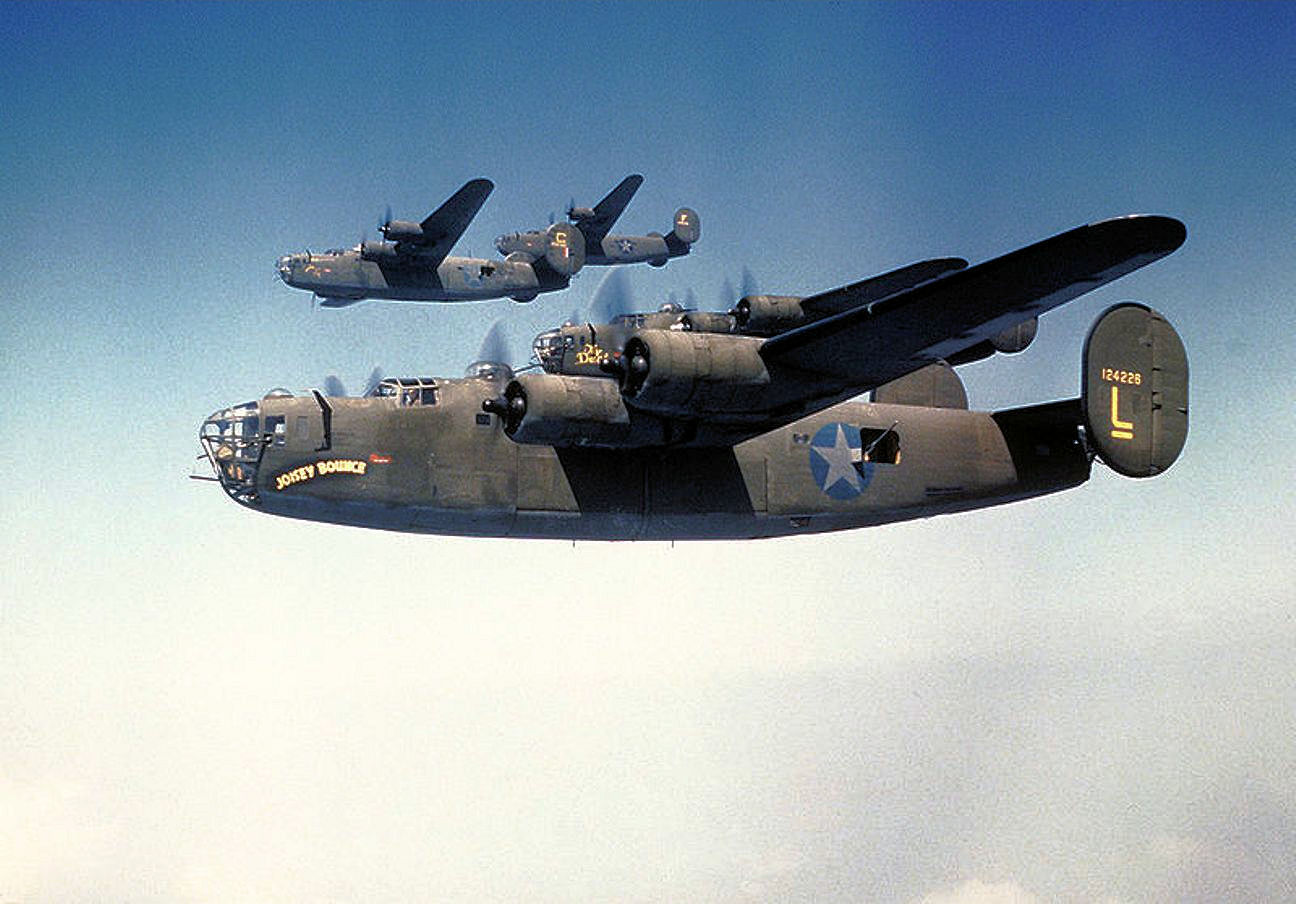
Squadron B-24 Liberator Formation (Note: Lead aircraft is Consolidated B-24D-25-CO Liberator, serial 41-24266, Joisey Bounce (crashed near Husum, Germany on 13 November 1943, second is Consolidated B-24D-20-CO Liberator, serial 41-24147, The Duchess (lost near Landau, Germany on 25 February 1944 Missing Aircrew Report 2924), third is Consolidated B-24D-1-CO Liberator, serial 41-23722, Bomberang, fourth is Consolidated B-24D-CO, serial 41-40246 [sic], Thundermug. Dirkx, Marco (18 August 2025). "1941 USAF Serial Numbers". Joe Baugher’s Serial Number List..)

The squadron was a member of the first B-24 heavy bomber group to become part of VIII Bomber Command in England. It flew its first mission on 9 October against a steel factory at Lille, France. Until December, it operated from RAF Alconbury primarily against submarine pens on the coast of the Bay of Biscay. The squadron flew some antisubmarine patrols with RAF Coastal Command from RAF Holmsley South. Later in the month the 330th transferred some of its personnel to the 329th Bombardment Squadron, which was training for special operations.

==== Deployments to the Mediterranean Theater ====
In early December, the squadron moved to RAF Hardwick. Shortly thereafter, air echelon of the squadron deployed to Algeria, where it came under the operational control of XII Bomber Command. Operating with inadequate supplies under difficult conditions the squadron struck heavy blows against enemy shipping and lines of communication during its Mediterranean deployment. Its base, Tafaraoui Airfield, had no hardened runways, and the first four missions had to be cancelled when heavy rains turned the airfield into a sea of mud, making it impossible to taxi. After flying one mission, the unit moved to Gambut Main, Libya, where it operated with IX Bomber Command. At Gambut, dust storms "played havoc" with the engines of the squadron's B-24s. The 330th flew 22 missions, attacking enemy ports and attacking Italian supply centers to support the British Eighth Army. The squadron was awarded its first Distinguished Unit Citation (DUC) for these efforts.

The squadron returned to England in February 1943 and until June attacked engine repair facilities, power plants, harbors, and other targets in France, the Low Countries and Germany. In May the squadron was withdrawn from operations and began to train for night attacks. However, this training ended abruptly and the squadrons of the 93rd Group joined those of the only other B-24 group in Eighth Air Force, the 44th Bombardment Group, in flying diversionary missions, while Eighth's Boeing B-17 Flying Fortresses attacked primary targets. On 29 May the squadron was once again taken off operations and began practicing low level flights over England. Norden bombsights were removed from unit B-24s and a modified gunsight, optimized for low level attacks, replaced them. Liberators that had been modified for night operations were sent to another unit and bomb bay tanks were installed in others.

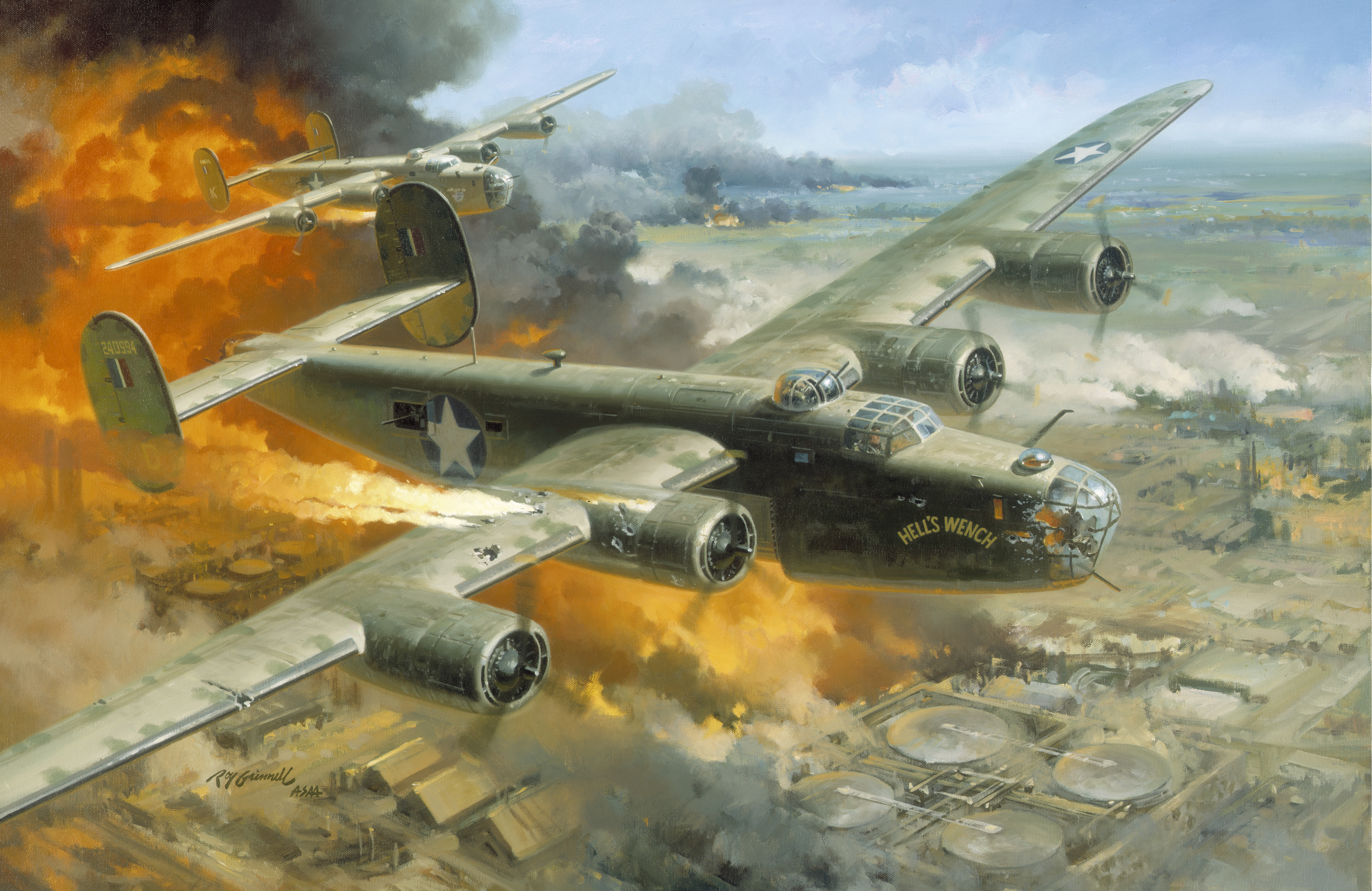
Fire Over Ploesti by Roy Grinnell depicting a 93rd Group B-24 during Operation Tidal Wave

In June, the squadron's air echelon deployed to Benina Airfield, Libya. From this base it initially supported Operation Husky, the invasion of Sicily, flying ten missions. Following this, the unit resumed low level training in Libya. On 1 August, the squadron participated in Operation Tidal Wave, the low level attack on oil refineries near Ploiești, where 60% of the Axis fuel was produced. This attack involved a round trip of over 2,000 miles. The squadron's formation followed the 376th Bombardment Group which had mistaken the Initial Point for the bomb run and flew the wrong course to the target, bombing targets that had been assigned to other groups, despite heavy opposition from enemy forces that had been fully alerted to the approach of the bombers. For this action, the squadron earned its second DUC. Before departing the Mediterranean, the squadron flew an attack against the Messerschmitt Bf 109 factory at Wiener Neustadt, stretching the range of its B-24s and requiring it to recover at bases in Tunisia, which were closer than its station in Libya.

==== Continuing operations from England ====
From England, the squadron resumed strategic bombardment raids against marshalling yards, aircraft factories, chemical plants, and oil refineries in Germany. The squadron also made tactical attacks on gun emplacements near Cherbourg Naval Base during Operation Overlord, the Normandy invasion, in June 1944 and attacked troop concentrations during the Saint Lo breakout the following month. In August and September, its bombers were diverted to airlifting food, gasoline, water and other supplies to Allies advancing through northern France. It also dropped supplies to airborne troops engaged in Operation Market Garden airborne attacks in the Netherlands.

Near the end of the war, on 24 March 1945, the squadron dropped supplies to airborne forces near Wesel and bombed a night fighter base near Störmede during Operation Varsity, the airborne assault across the Rhine. The squadron ended combat operations in April, and began returning to the United States in May and June. The ground echelon sailed aboard the RMS Queen Mary and received thirty days leave upon arrival.

=== Cold War ===
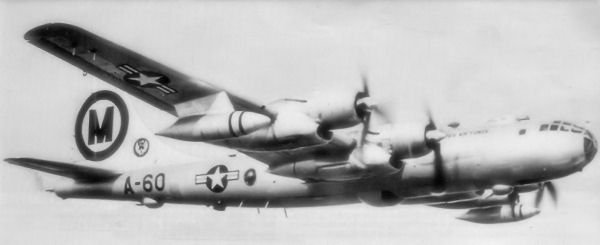
93rd Bombardment Group B-50

The squadron was nominally stationed at Sioux Falls Army Air Field, South Dakota, gathering there as its personnel ended their leaves, moving to Pratt Army Air Field, Kansas the following month to begin training with the Boeing B-29 Superfortress. At the end of the year the squadron moved to Clovis Army Air Field, New Mexico. When Strategic Air Command (SAC) was formed in March 1946 it became part of the new command. Shortly thereafter, in June 1946, it moved to Castle Field, California. The squadron maintained combat readiness for global bombardment operations. In 1948, the squadron deployed to Kadena Air Base, Okinawa when the 93rd Group became the first SAC unit to deploy as a unit to the Far East.

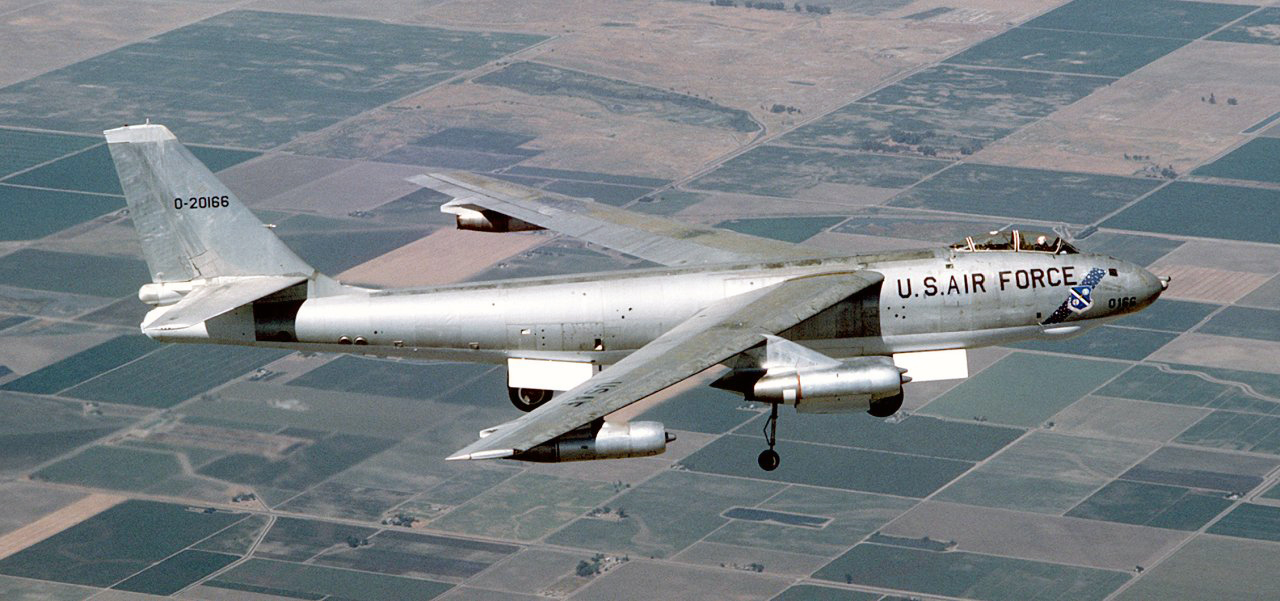
B-47 in 93rd Bombardment Wing markings

The squadron began upgrading to the Boeing B-50 Superfortress, an advanced version of the B-29, in 1950. The B-50 gave the unit the capability to carry heavy loads of conventional weapons faster and farther as well as being designed for nuclear weapon missions if necessary. From July 1950 to January 1951, the squadron deployed to RAF Mildenhall, repeating this deployment from December 1952 to March 1952. SAC’s mobilization for the Korean War highlighted that SAC wing commanders focused too much on running the base organization and not spending enough time on overseeing actual combat preparations. To allow wing commanders the ability to focus on combat operations, the air base group commander became responsible for managing the base housekeeping functions. Under the plan implemented in February 1951 and finalized in June 1952, the wing commander focused primarily on the combat units and the maintenance necessary to support combat aircraft, the squadron was assigned directly to the 93d Bombardment Wing as the 93rd Group was inactivated.

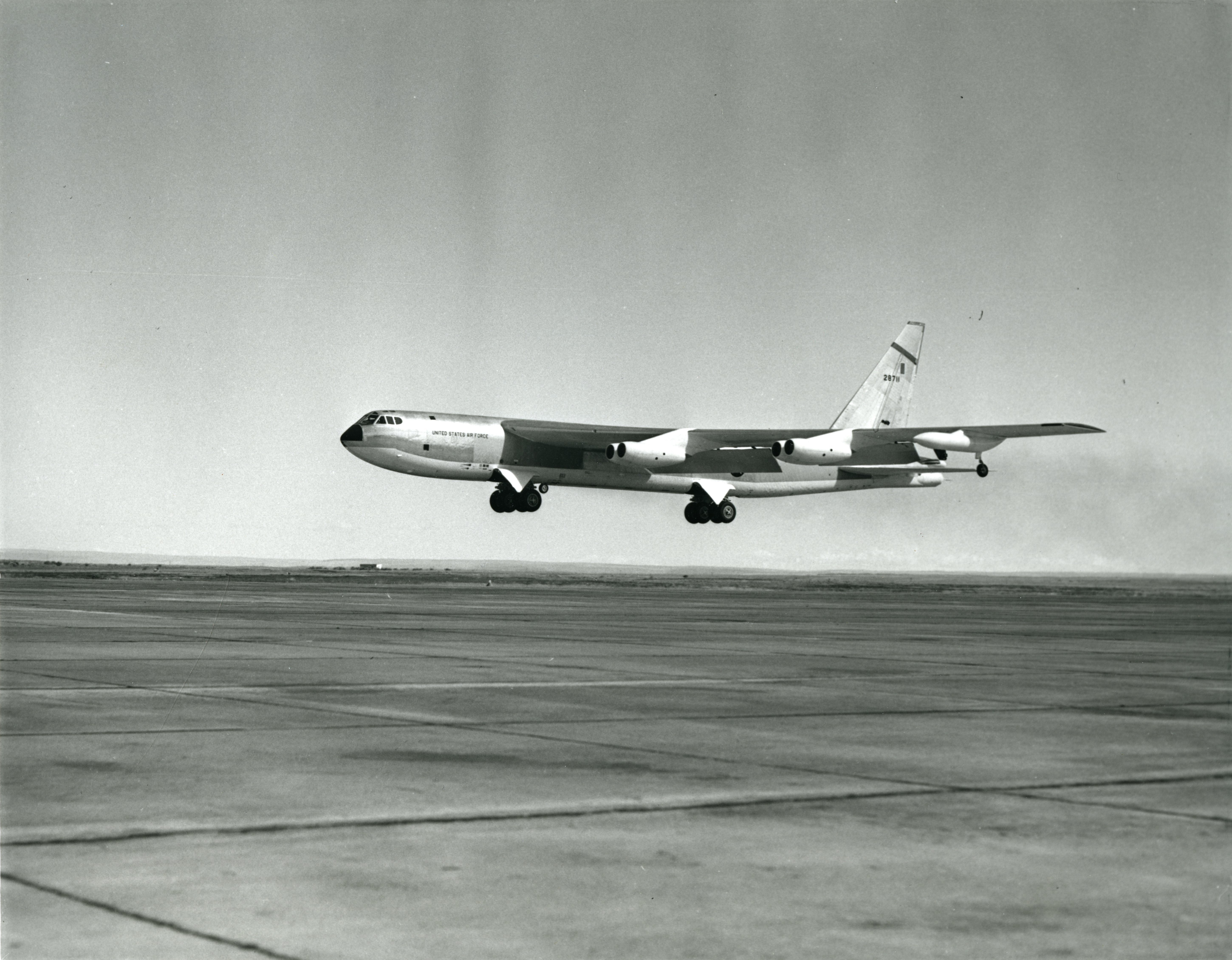
First B-52B delivered to SAC and the 93rd Wing

The squadron received Boeing B-47 Stratojet jet bombers in 1954, but only flew the Stratojet for a year. In 1955 the 93rd Wing became the first unit in SAC to equip with Boeing B-52 Stratofortresses. In 1957, the squadron became a training unit for B-52 crews, while still maintaining combat readiness. During the Cuban Missile Crisis, the squadron suspended its training mission. On 24 October SAC went to DEFCON 2, placing all aircraft on alert. The squadron resumed its training mission on 15 November 1962. The squadron moved to March Air Force Base, California on 15 September 1963. Upon arrival, it transferred its personnel and equipment to the activating 2nd Bombardment Squadron of the 22nd Bombardment Wing, which was converting from B-47s to B-52s, and the squadron was inactivated.

=== Post Cold War ===
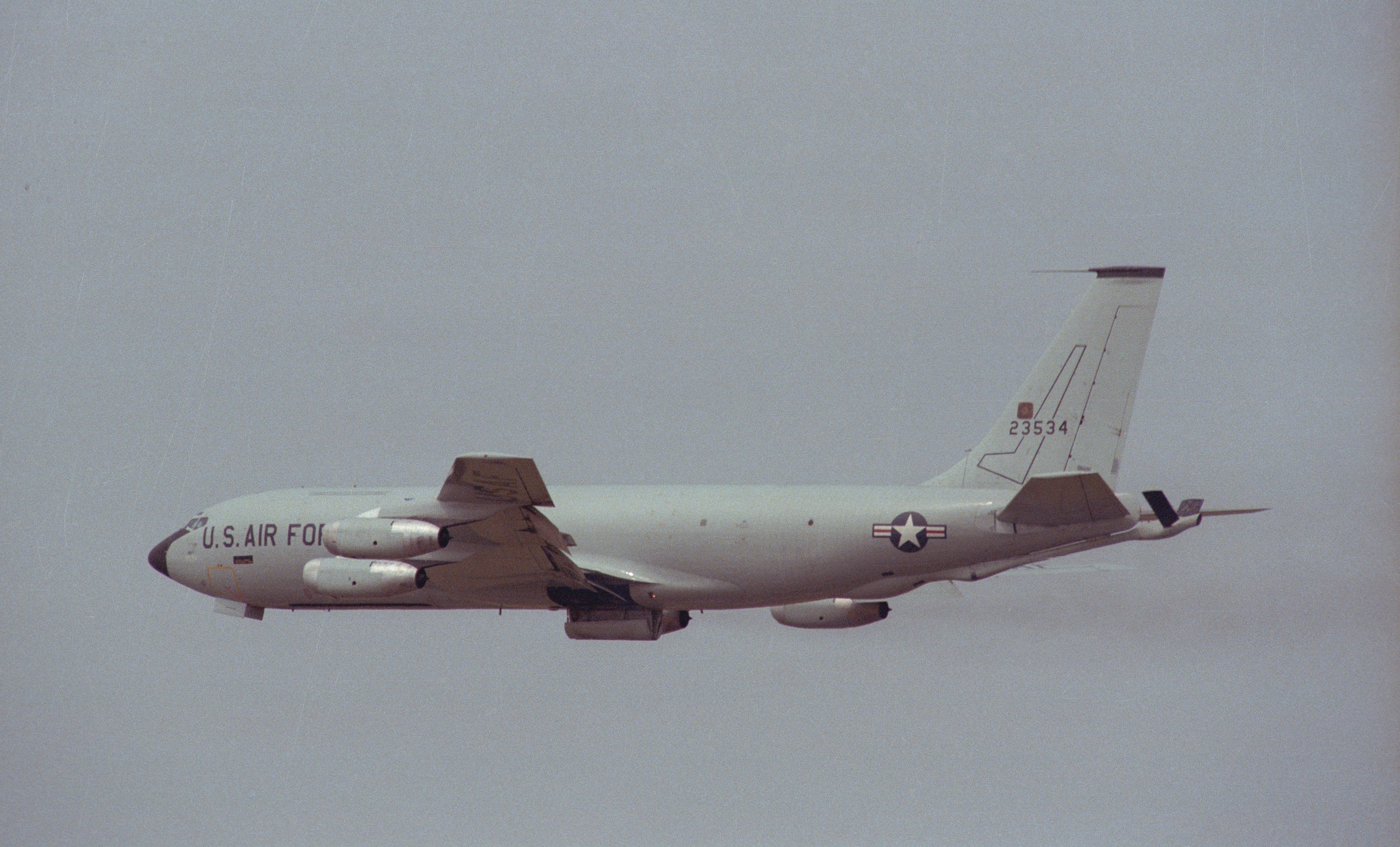
KC-135 as flown by the squadron

The squadron was redesignated the 330th Combat Flight Instructor Squadron and activated under the 93rd Wing at Castle Air Force Base in August 1988. Its mission was to train flight instructors for the B-52 and Boeing KC-135 Stratotanker aircraft. When SAC inactivated in June 1992, the squadron lost its B-52 training mission. it became the 330th Flying Training Squadron and continued to train KC-135 instructors as part of the 398th Operations Group of Air Mobility Command (AMC). In 1994, AMC consolidated its training at Altus Air Force Base, Oklahoma, and the squadron inactivated as the 97th Training Squadron at Altus assumed its mission.

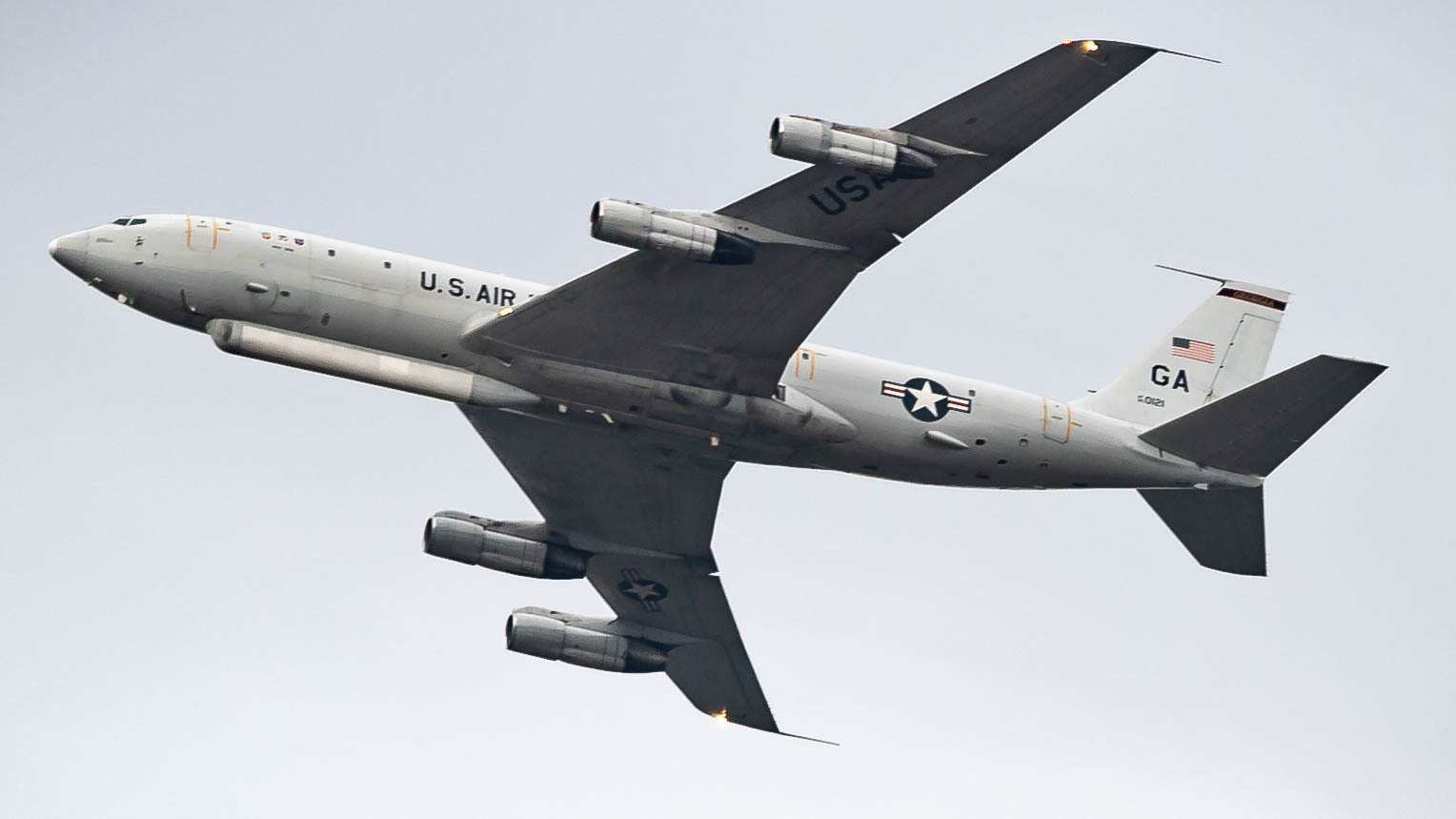
An E-8C JSTARS of the 461st and 116th Wings

The squadron was redesignated the 330th Combat Training Squadron and activated in August 2002 at Robins Air Force Base, Georgia as the training unit for E-8 Joint STARS (STARS) aircrews. It transferred to the 116th Air Control Wing of the Georgia Air National Guard in October, when the 116th became the primary operator of the JSTARS. The squadron returned to the regular Air Force in 2011 as the 461st Air Control Wing became an associate in the JSTARS mission. The squadron flew its last flight with the E-8 on 23 February 2023.

In April 2023, the 330th Combat Training Squadron began its present mission, training airmen to execute the Tactical Operations Center-Fixed (later Battle Control Center) mission.

== Lineage ==
- Constituted as the 330th Bombardment Squadron (Heavy) on 28 January 1942

Activated on 1 March 1942
Redesignated 330th Bombardment Squadron, Heavy on 20 August 1943
Redesignated 330th Bombardment Squadron, Very Heavy on 23 May 1945
Redesignated 330th Bombardment Squadron, Medium on 28 May 1948
Redesignated 330th Bombardment Squadron, Heavy on 1 February 1955
Inactivated on 15 September 1963
Redesignated as 330th Combat Flight Instructor Squadron on 5 August 1988
Activated on 24 August 1988
Redesignated as 330th Flying Training Squadron on 1 June 1992
Inactivated on 20 January 1994
Redesignated as 330th Combat Training Squadron on 28 June 2002
Activated on 13 August 2002
Allotted to the National Guard Bureau on 1 October 2002
Relieved from allotment to the National Guard Bureau on 1 October 2011

=== Assignments ===
- 93rd Bombardment Group, 1 March 1942 (attached to 93rd Bombardment Wing after 10 February 1951)
- 93rd Bombardment Wing, 16 June 1952 – 15 September 1963 (under the operational control of the 22nd Bombardment Wing after c. 5 September 1963)
- 93rd Bombardment Wing, 24 August 1988
- 93rd Operations Group, 1 September 1991
- 398th Operations Group, 1 June 1992 – 20 January 1994
- 93d Operations Group, 13 August 2002
- 116th Air Control Wing, 1 October 2002
- 461st Operations Group, 1 October 2011 – present

=== Stations ===
- Barksdale Field, Louisiana, 1 March 1942
- Page Field, Florida, 18 May-13 August 1942
- RAF Alconbury (AAF-102), England, 7 September 1942
- RAF Hardwick (AAF-104), England, c. 6 December 1942 – 15 June 1945 (Air echelon operated from Tafaraoui Airfield, Algeria, 7–15 December 1942; RAF Gambut, Libya, 16 December 1942 – 25 February 1943; Benina Airfield, Libya, 27 June-26 August 1943; Oudna Airfield, Tunisia, 18 September-3 October 1943)
- Sioux Falls Army Air Field, South Dakota, 26 June–26 July 1945
- Pratt Army Air Field, Kansas, 20 August 1945
- Clovis Army Air Field, New Mexico, 13 December 1945
- Castle Field (later Castle Air Force Base), California, 21 June 1946
- March Air Force Base, California, 15 September 1963
- Castle Air Force Base, California, 24 August 1988 – 20 January 1994
- Robins Air Force Base, Georgia, 13 August 2002 – present

=== Aircraft/Weapons Systems ===
- Consolidated B-24 Liberator, 1942–1945
- Boeing B-29 Superfortress, 1945–1949
- Boeing B-50 Superfortress, 1949–1954
- Boeing B-47 Stratojet, 1954–1955
- Boeing B-52B Stratofortress, 1955–1963
- Boeing B-52H Stratofortress, 1988–1992
- Boeing KC-135 Stratotanker, 1988–1993
- Boeing E-8 Joint STARS, 2002–2023
- Tactical Operations Center-Fixed (later Battle Control Center), 2023–present

=== Awards and campaigns ===
Award streamer	Award	Dates	Notes
	Distinguished Unit Citation	17 December 1942 – 20 February 1943	330th Bombardment Squadron North Africa
	Distinguished Unit Citation	1 August 1943	330th Bombardment Squadron Ploesti, Rumania
	Air Force Meritorious Unit Award	1 October 2010 – 31 March 2012	330th Combat Training Squadron
	Air Force Meritorious Unit Award	1 April 2012 – 31 May 2013	330th Combat Training Squadron
	Air Force Meritorious Unit Award	1 June 2014 – 31 May 2015	330th Combat Training Squadron
	Air Force Meritorious Unit Award	1 June 2015 – 31 May 2016	330th Combat Training Squadron
	Air Force Meritorious Unit Award	1 June 2016 – 31 May 2017	330th Combat Training Squadron
	Air Force Meritorious Unit Award	1 June 2018 – 31 May 2019	330th Combat Training Squadron
	Air Force Outstanding Unit Award	31 January 1956 – 1 July 1959	330th Bombardment Squadron
	Air Force Outstanding Unit Award	1 June 1962 – 1 April 1963	330th Bombardment Squadron
	Air Force Outstanding Unit Award	[24 August] 1988 – 30 June 1990	330th Combat Flight Instructor Squadron
	Air Force Outstanding Unit Award	2 August 1990 – 11 April 1991	330th Combat Flight Instructor Squadron
	Air Force Outstanding Unit Award	1 October 1992 – 30 June 1993	330th Flying Training Squadron
	Air Force Outstanding Unit Award	1 July 1993 – 30 September 1993	330th Flying Training Squadron
	Air Force Outstanding Unit Award	31 August 2004 – 31 May 2006	330th Combat Training Squadron
	Air Force Outstanding Unit Award	1 June 2006 – 31 May 2007	330th Combat Training Squadron
	Air Force Outstanding Unit Award	1 June 2013 – 31 May 2014	330th Combat Training Squadron
	Air Force Outstanding Unit Award	1 June 2017 – 31 May 2018	330th Combat Training Squadron

Campaign Streamer	Campaign	Dates	Notes
	Antisubmarine	18 May 1942–1 August 1943	330th Bombardment Squadron
	Air Offensive, Europe	7 September 1942–5 June 1944	330th Bombardment Squadron
	Sicily	27 June 1943–17 August 1943	330th Bombardment Squadron
	Naples-Foggia	18 September 1943–3 October 1943	330th Bombardment Squadron
	Normandy	6 June 1944–24 July 1944	330th Bombardment Squadron
	Rhineland	15 September 1944–21 March 1945	330th Bombardment Squadron
	Ardennes-Alsace	16 December 1944–25 January 1945	330th Bombardment Squadron
	Central Europe	22 March 1944–21 May 1945	330th Bombardment Squadron

== See also ==
- List of B-52 Units of the United States Air Force
- List of B-47 units of the United States Air Force
- List of B-50 units of the United States Air Force
- List of B-29 Superfortress operators
- B-24 Liberator units of the United States Army Air Forces
