= 329th Combat Crew Training Squadron =

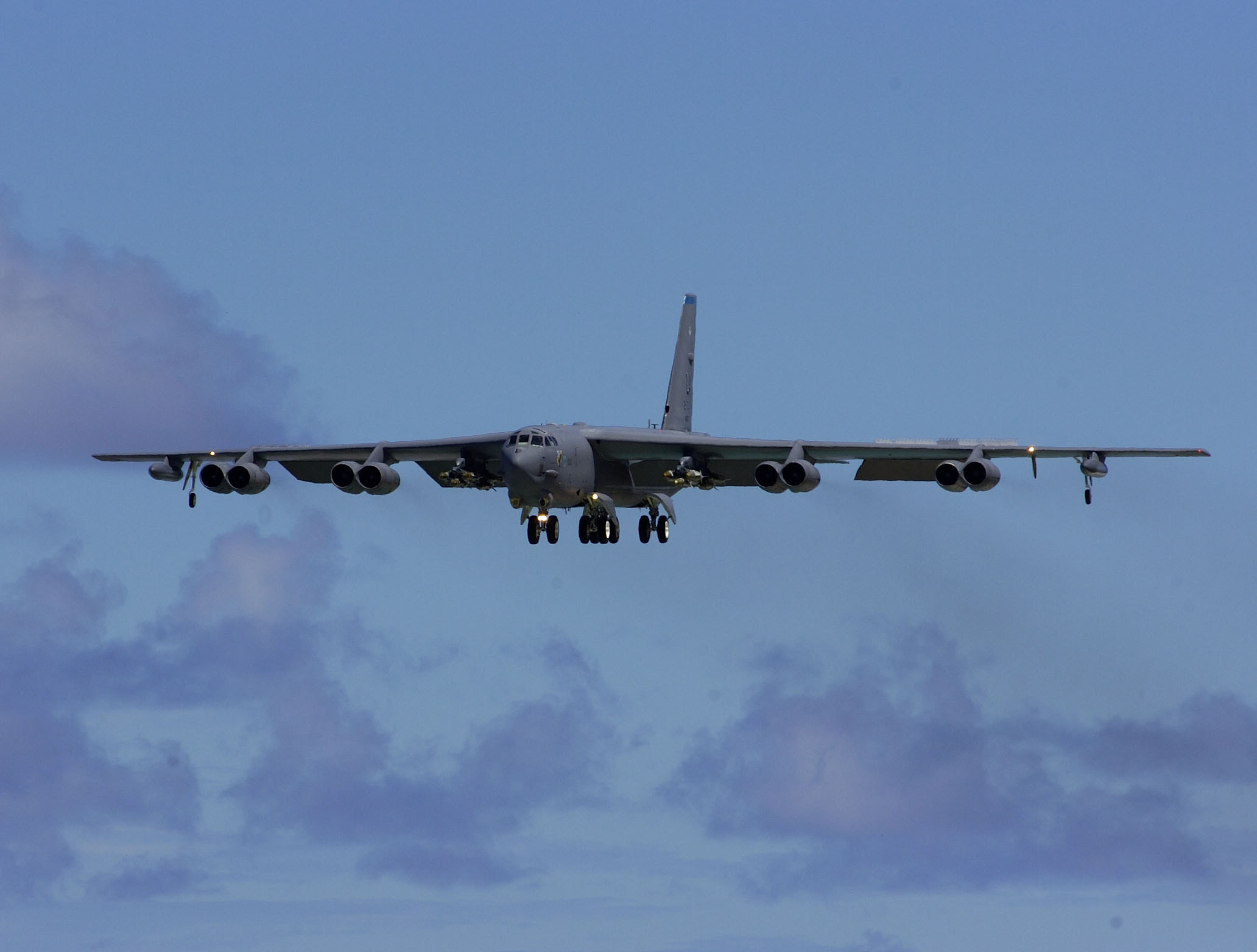
- B-52 Stratofortress as flown by the squadron
- Active: 1942-1971; 1986-1994
- Country: United States
- Branch: United States Air Force
- Role: Strategic bomber training
- Mottos: Universal Air Enforced: Peace and Law (1956-1971); Where it All Begins (1986-1994)
- Engagements: European Theater of Operations; Mediterranean Theater of Operations
- Decorations: Distinguished Unit Citation; Air Force Outstanding Unit Award

Insignia
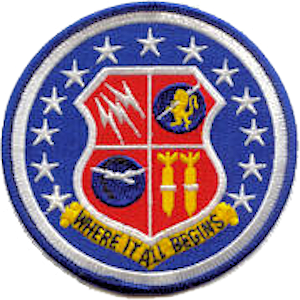
- Patch with 329th Combat Crew Training Squadron emblem

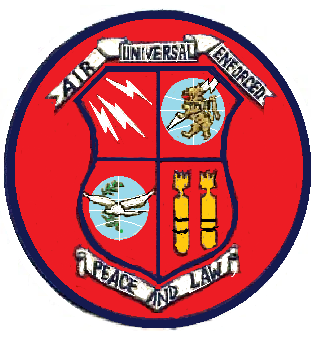
- 329th Bombardment Squadron emblem (Note: Approved 25 April 1956. Description: A red shield, quartered and edged with an AF blue band; 1st quarter, in bend three radiating lightning flashes white; 2d quarter, over a light blue sphere, border and grid lines white, a lion rampant AF yellow brandishing a thunderbolt white; 3d quarter, over a light blue sphere border and grid lines white, a dove volant in his proper colors carrying in his beak an olive branch green; 4th quarter, two bombs palewise points downward, AF yellow, trimmed AF blue. This emblem was later placed on a disc to comply with regulations for squadron emblems.)

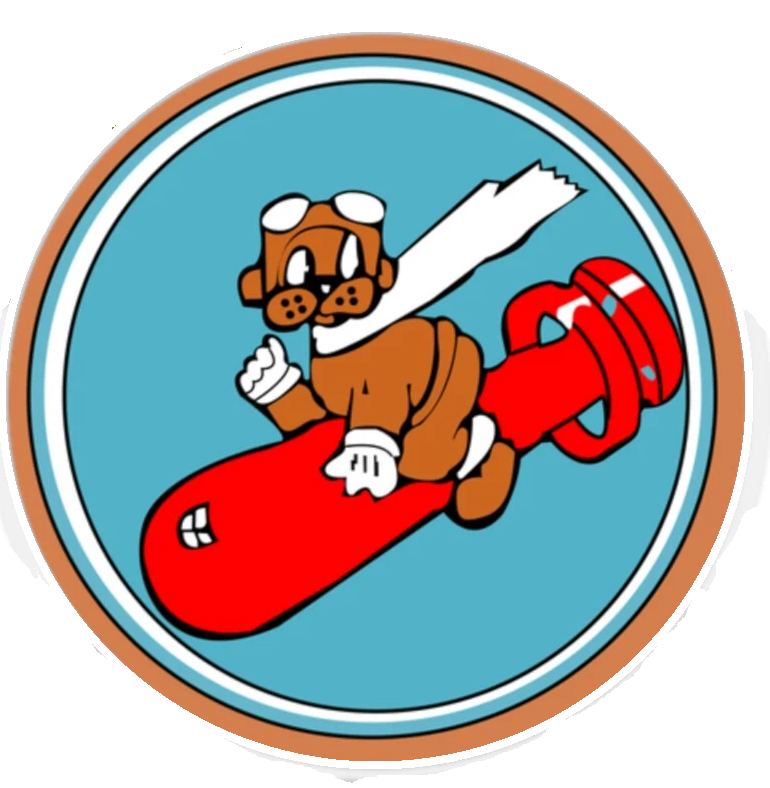
- World War II squadron emblem
- World War II fuselage code: RE

The 329th Combat Crew Training Squadron is an inactive United States Air Force unit. It was last assigned to the 93d Operations Group at Castle Air Force Base, California, where it was responsible for the training of Boeing B-52 Stratofortress aircrews until inactivating on 1 July 1994.

The squadron was first activated as the 329th Bombardment Squadron in 1942 and trained with Consolidated B-24 Liberator heavy bombers. During training, it also flew antisubmarine patrols over the Gulf of Mexico. It was one of the first bomber units to deploy to the European Theater of Operations, to participate in the strategic bombing campaign against Germany. In 1943, its air echelon moved to reinforce the bomber force in the Mediterranean Theater of Operations, where it earned a Distinguished Unit Citation for its participation in Operation Tidal Wave. Following V-E Day, the squadron returned to the United States to retrain as a Boeing B-29 Superfortress unit.

In 1946, the squadron moved to Castle Field, which was to be its home for the rest of its existence. It trained for bomber operations and also conducted the flying phase of B-52 aircrew training until inactivating in 1971. It was reactivated at Castle in the training mission in 1986 as the 329th Strategic Bomber Training Squadron.

== History ==
=== World War II ===
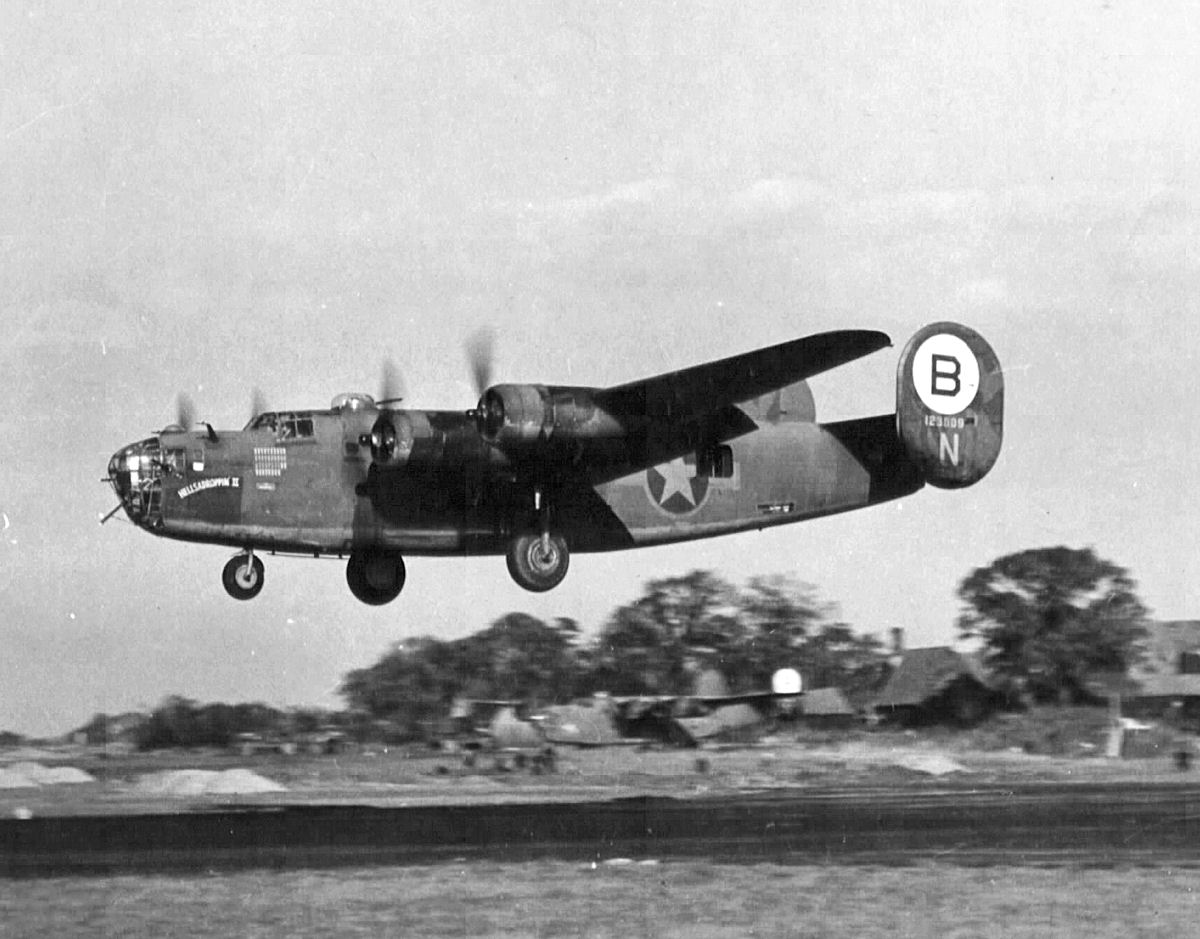
Squadron B-24 Liberator landing at RAF Hardwick on 21 December 1943. (Note: Aircraft is Consolidated B-24D-5-CO Liberator, serial 41-23809 Hellsadroppin' II. It was declared "war weary" and transferred to the 448th Bombardment Group to use as a formation assembly ship. it was condemned for salvage on 19 January 1945. Dirkx, Marco (18 August 2025). "1941 USAF Serial Numbers". Joe Baugher’s Serial Number List.)

==== Initial organization and training in the US ====
The squadron was activated at Barksdale Field, Louisiana in March 1942 as one of the original four squadrons of the 93rd Bombardment Group. It began Phase I (Note: Phase I training concentrated on individual training in crewmember specialties. Later phases concentrated on crew coordination and operation as a unit. Greer, p. 606.) training conducted by the 44th Bombardment Group with Consolidated B-24 Liberators at Barksdale, then moved to Page Field, Florida for final training, preparing to deploy to the European Theater of Operations. From Page, the squadron also flew antisubmarine patrols over the Gulf of Mexico and the Caribbean Sea until July, when it began preparing for movement to England. The squadron moved to Fort Dix, New Jersey on 2 August. The ground echelon sailed for England on 15 August aboard the RMS Queen Elizabeth, while the air echelon moved to Grenier Field, New Hampshire, where they received new B-24s, which they ferried across the Atlantic. Rather than flying their ships across individually, the squadrons of the 93rd Group were the first to make the crossing in formation.

==== Combat in Europe ====
The squadron assembled at RAF Alconbury in early September, where it was part of the first B-24 bombardment group to become part of VIII Bomber Command in England. It flew its first mission on 9 October against a steel factory at Lille. Until December, it operated primarily against submarine pens on the coast of the Bay of Biscay. The squadron flew some antisubmarine patrols with RAF Coastal Command from RAF Holmsley South. In mid-December, the squadron was selected as the first B-24 unit equipped with the British Gee radio navigation system. Augmented by crews from other squadrons of the 93rd Group, it moved to RAF Bungay, from which it conducted "Moling" missions. These were individual aircraft raids, conducted to disrupt the German air defense systems by alerting early warning radars. Due to the sensitivity of the Gee equipment, these missions were only flown in bad weather, when the chances of interception over enemy territory were minimal. The squadron flew its first Moling mission to the Ruhr on 2 January, it was forced to turn back because of the lack of cloud cover over the target area. Similar weather conditions prevailed on further missions, and the tests were terminated on 28 March 1943. However, a number of the crew trained on blind bombing were later used to form Eighth Air Force pathfinder units. The remaining elements of the squadron at Bungay returned to RAF Hardwick in June 1943.

The squadron also engaged in day bombing operations, joining formations of the 44th Bombardment Group, the only other B-24 group in Eighth Air Force, while the other squadrons of the 93rd were in Africa. On 3 May the squadron was withdrawn from operations and began to train for night attacks. However, this training ended abruptly and all the squadrons of the 93d Group joined those of the 44th Group in flying diversionary missions, while Eighth's Boeing B-17 Flying Fortresses attacked primary targets. On 29 May the squadron was once again taken off operations and began practicing low level flights over England. Norden bombsights were removed from unit B-24s and a modified gunsight, optimized for low level attacks, replaced them. Squadron Liberators that had been modified for night operations were sent to another unit and bomb bay tanks were installed in others.

==== Deployments to the Mediterranean Theater ====
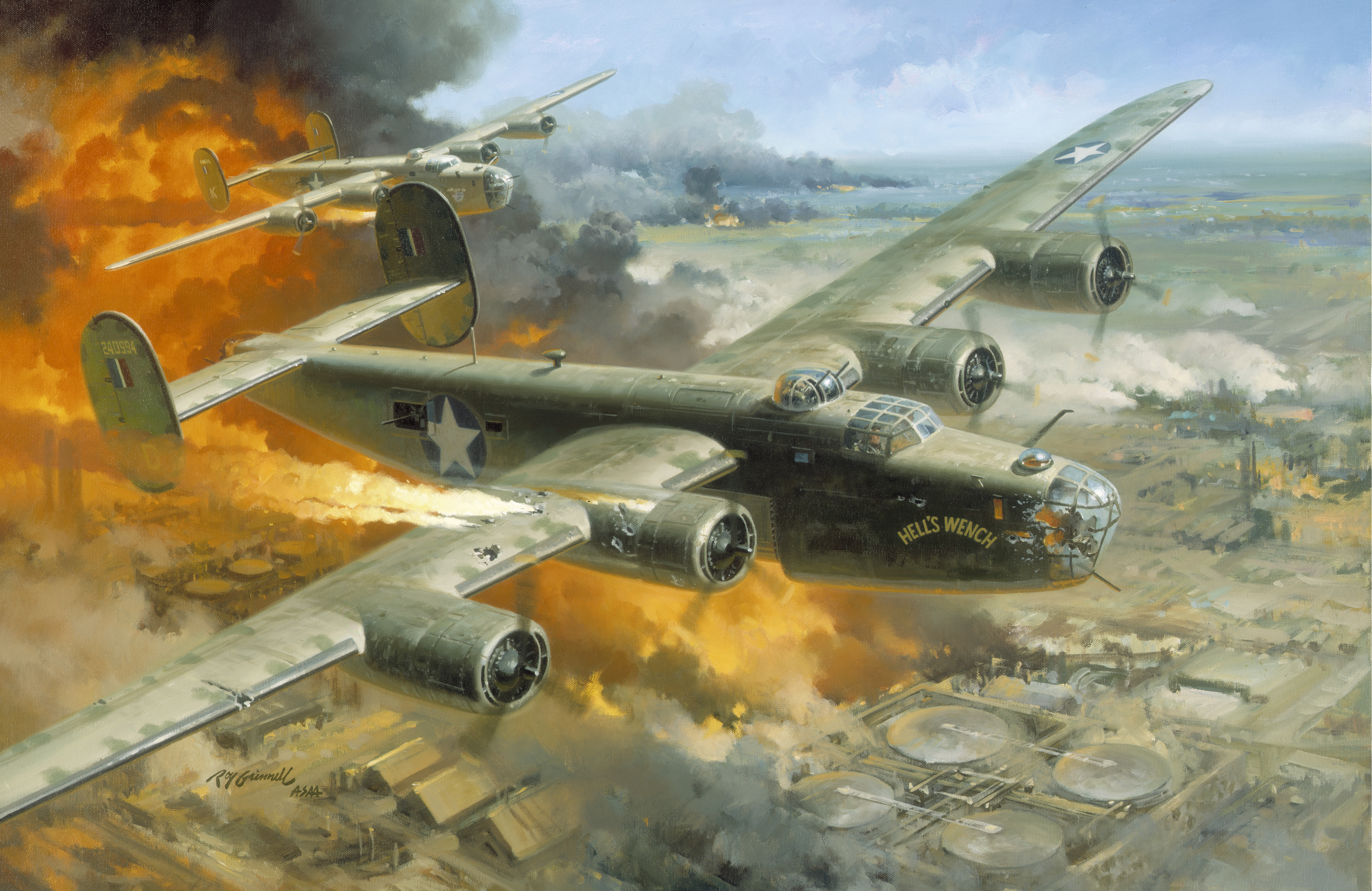
Fire Over Ploesti by Roy Grinnell depicting a 93rd Group B-24 during Operation Tidal Wave

In June, the air echelon deployed to Benina Airfield, Libya. From this base it initially supported Operation Husky, the invasion of Sicily, flying ten missions. Following this, the unit resumed low level training in Libya. On 1 August, the squadron participated in Operation Tidal Wave, the low level attack on oil refineries near Ploiești, where 60% of the Axis fuel was produced. This attack involved a round trip of over 2,000 miles, which was beyond the range of B-17s, but within the range of B-24s. All three of Eighth Air Force's Liberator groups were sent to reinforce the two B-24 groups of IX Bomber Command for this operation. During the attack, the squadron's formation followed the 376th Bombardment Group which had mistaken the Initial Point for the bomb run and flew the wrong course to the target, bombing targets that had been assigned to other groups, despite heavy opposition from enemy forces that had been fully alerted to the approach of the bombers. For this action, the squadron earned the Distinguished Unit Citation. Before departing the Mediterranean, the squadron flew an attack against the Messerschmitt Bf 109 factory at Wiener Neustadt, stretching the range of its B-24s and requiring it to recover at bases in Tunisia, which were closer than its station in Libya.

The squadron returned to England in August, but flew only two missions before the air echelon returned to the Mediterranean to fly missions from Oudna Airfield, Tunisia to support the Fifth Army landings at Salerno during Operation Avalanche, the invasion of Italy. The crews and aircraft returned to England in October.

==== Continuing operations from England ====
From England, the squadron resumed strategic bombardment raids against marshalling yards, aircraft factories, chemical plants, and oil refineries in Germany. The squadron also made tactical attacks on gun emplacements near Cherbourg Naval Base during Operation Overlord, the Normandy invasion, in June 1944 and attacked troop concentrations during the Saint Lo breakout the following month. In August and September, its bombers were diverted to airlifting food, gasoline, water and other supplies to Allies advancing through northern France. It also dropped supplies to airborne troops engaged in Operation Market Garden airborne attacks in the Netherlands.

Near the end of the war, on 24 March 1945, the squadron dropped supplies to airborne forces near Wesel and bombed a night fighter base near Störmede during Operation Varsity, the airborne assault across the Rhine. The squadron ended combat operations in April, and began returning to the United States in May and June. The ground echelon sailed aboard the RMS Queen Mary and received thirty days leave upon arrival.

=== Post war operations ===
The squadron was nominally stationed at Sioux Falls Army Air Field, South Dakota, gathering there as its personnel ended their leaves, moving to Pratt Army Air Field, Kansas the following month to begin training with the Boeing B-29 Superfortress. At the end of the year the squadron moved to Clovis Army Air Field, New Mexico. When Strategic Air Command (SAC) was formed in March 1946 it became part of the new command. Shortly thereafter, in June 1946, it moved to Castle Field, California, which would be its base for the rest of its existence. The squadron maintained combat readiness for global bombardment operations. In 1948, the squadron deployed to Kadena Air Base, Okinawa when the 93rd Group became the first SAC unit to deploy as a unit to the Far East.

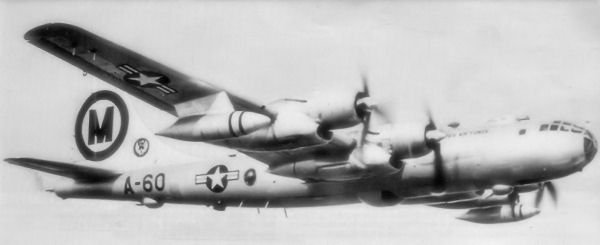
93rd Bombardment Group B-50

The squadron began upgrading to the Boeing B-50 Superfortress, an advanced version of the B-29, in 1950. The B-50 gave the unit the capability to carry heavy loads of conventional weapons faster and farther as well as being designed for nuclear weapon missions if necessary. From July to October 1950, the squadron deployed to RAF Mildenhall, repeating this deployment from December 1952 to March 1952. SAC’s mobilization for the Korean War highlighted that SAC wing commanders focused too much on running the base organization and not spending enough time on overseeing actual combat preparations. To allow wing commanders the ability to focus on combat operations, the air base group commander became responsible for managing the base housekeeping functions. Under the plan implemented in February 1951 and finalized in June 1952, the wing commander focused primarily on the combat units and the maintenance necessary to support combat aircraft, the squadron was assigned directly to the 93d Bombardment Wing as the 93rd Group was inactivated.

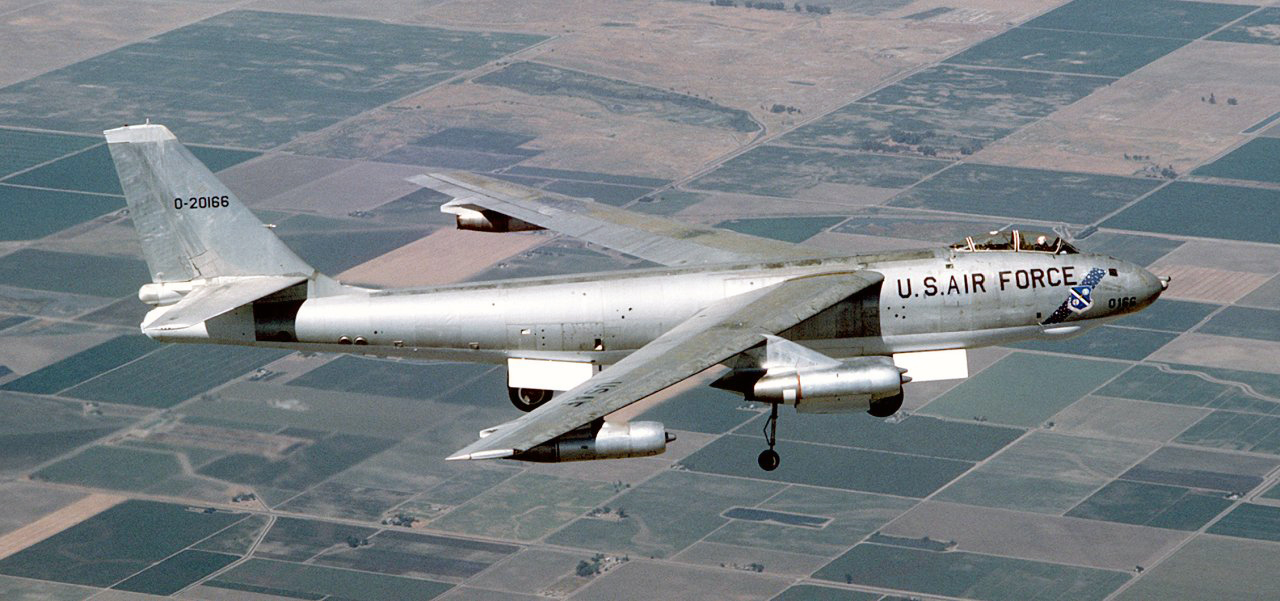
B-47 in 93rd Bombardment Wing markings

The squadron received Boeing B-47 Stratojet jet bombers in 1954, but only flew the Stratojet for a year. In 1955 the 93rd Wing became the first unit in SAC to equip with Boeing B-52 Stratofortresses. On completing its transition, the squadron became a training unit for B-52 crews.

During the Cuban Missile Crisis, the squadron suspended its training mission. On 24 October SAC went to DEFCON 2, placing all aircraft on alert. The squadron resumed its training mission on 15 November 1962.

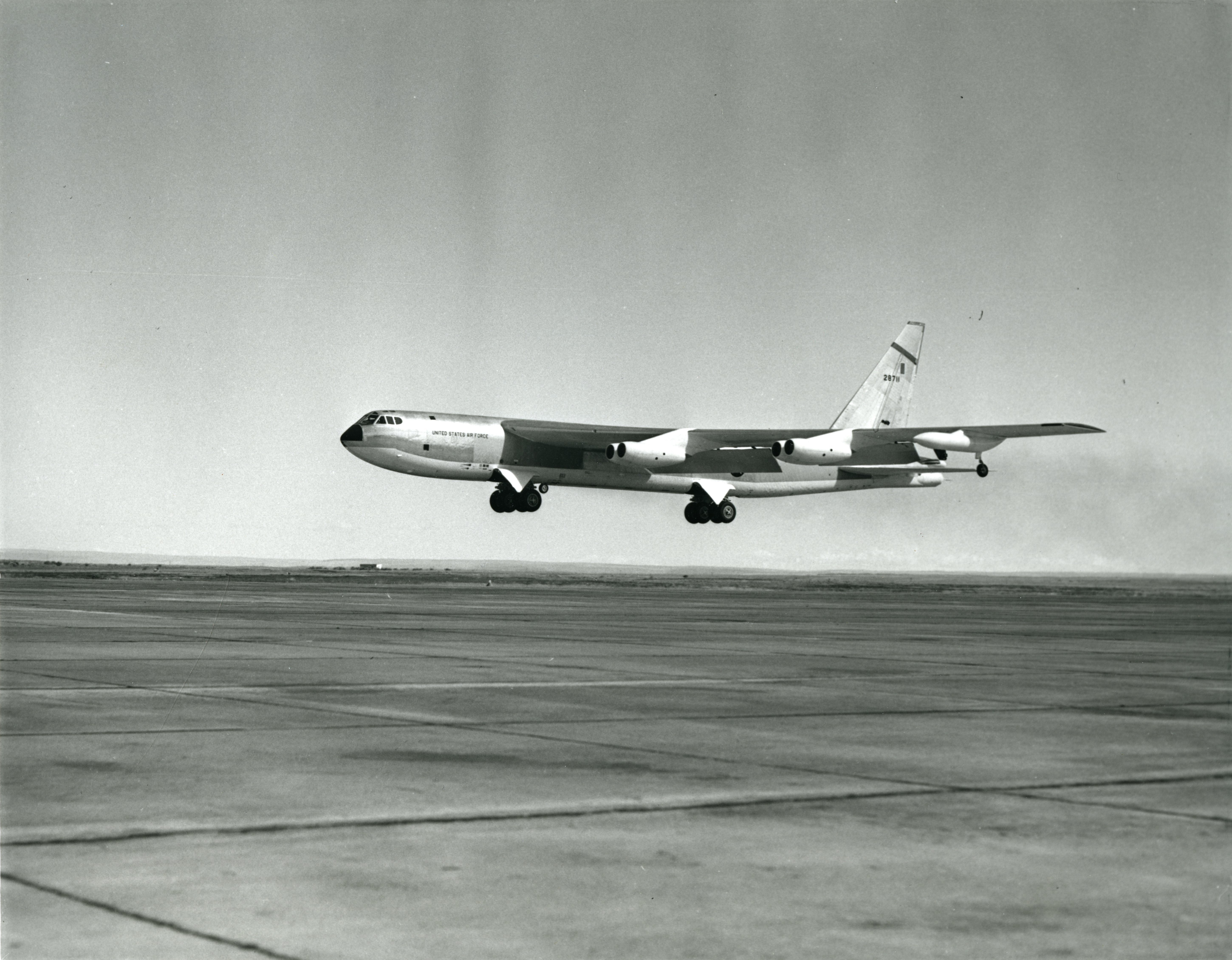
First B-52B delivered to SAC and the 93rd Wing

The squadron ceased operations on 14 September 1971 and was inactivated at the end of the month. It was redesignated 329th Strategic Bombardment Training Squadron and reactivated, again serving as a B-52 combat crew training squadron in 1986. It was inactivated in 1994 after the end of the Cold War and the reduction of the B-52 fleet.

== Lineage ==
- Constituted 329th Bombardment Squadron (Heavy) on 28 January 1942

Activated on 1 March 1942
Redesignated: 329th Bombardment Squadron, Heavy on 20 August 1943
Redesignated: 329th Bombardment Squadron, Very Heavy on 23 May 1945
Redesignated: 329th Bombardment Squadron, Medium on 28 May 1948
Redesignated: 329th Bombardment Squadron, Heavy on 1 February 1955
Inactivated on 30 September 1971 (Note: A Bombardment Squadron, Provisional, 329th was organized at Anderson Air Force Base, Guam on 1 June 1972 and assigned to the Strategic Wing, Provisional, 72d, operating B-52s deployed from bases in the United States. It was inactivated on 15 November 1973. This provisional unit is not related to the 329th Combat Crew Training Squadron despite its similar name.)
Redesignated 329th Strategic Bombardment Training Squadron c. 12 February 1986
Activated on 1 July 1986
Redesignated 329th Combat Crew Training Squadron c. 1 July 1987
Inactivated on 1 July 1994

=== Assignments ===
- 93d Bombardment Group, 1 March 1942 (attached to 93d Bombardment Wing after 10 February 1951)
- 93d Bombardment Wing, 16 June 1952 – 30 September 1971
- 93d Bombardment Wing, 1 July 1986
- 93d Operations Group, 1 September 1991 – 1 July 1994

=== Stations ===
- Barksdale Field, Louisiana, 1 March 1942
- Page Field, Florida, 18 May – 13 August 1942
- RAF Alconbury (AAF-102), England, 7 September 1942
- RAF Hardwick (AAF-104), England, c. 6 December 1942
- RAF Bungay (AAF-125), c. 14 December 1942
- RAF Hardwick (AAF-104), c. 15 June 1943 – 15 June 1945 (operated from Benghazi Airfield, Libya, 27 June - 25 August 1943. Oudna Airfield, Tunisia, 18 September – 3 October 1943)
- Sioux Falls Army Air Field, South Dakota, 26 June–26 July 1945
- Pratt Army Air Field, Kansas, 20 August 1945
- Clovis Army Air Field, New Mexico, 13 December 1945
- Castle Field (later Castle Air Force Base), California, 21 June 1946 – 30 September 1971
- Castle Air Force Base, California, 1 July 1986 – 1 July 1994

=== Aircraft ===
- Consolidated B-24 Liberator, 1942–1945
- Boeing B-29 Superfortress, 1945–1949
- Boeing B-50 Superfortress, 1949–1954
- Boeing B-47 Stratojet, 1954–1955
- Boeing B-52 Stratofortress, 1955–1971, 1986–1994

=== Awards and campaigns ===
Award streamer	Award	Dates	Notes
	Distinguished Unit Citation	1 August 1943	329th Bombardment Squadron Ploesti, Rumania
	Air Force Outstanding Unit Award	31 January 1956–1 July 1959	329th Bombardment Squadron
	Air Force Outstanding Unit Award	1 June 1962–1 April 1963	329th Bombardment Squadron
	Air Force Outstanding Unit Award	1 July 1988–30 June 1990	329th Combat Crew Training Squadron
	Air Force Outstanding Unit Award	1 July 1990–29 May 1992	329th Combat Crew Training Squadron

Campaign Streamer	Campaign	Dates	Notes
	Antisubmarine	18 May 1942–1 August 1943	329th Bombardment Squadron
	Air Offensive, Europe	7 September 1942–5 June 1944	329th Bombardment Squadron
	Sicily	27 June 1943–17 August 1943	329th Bombardment Squadron
	Naples-Foggia	18 September 1943–3 October 1943	329th Bombardment Squadron
	Normandy	6 June 1944–24 July 1944	329th Bombardment Squadron
	Rhineland	15 September 1944–21 March 1945	329th Bombardment Squadron (Note: Maurer does not list credit for the Northern France Campaign, although the 93rd Group and all other squadrons of the group are credited with that campaign, and no source indicates that the 329th was withdrawn from combat between July and September of 1944.)
	Ardennes-Alsace	16 December 1944–25 January 1945	329th Bombardment Squadron
	Central Europe	22 March 1944–21 May 1945	329th Bombardment Squadron

== See also ==
- List of B-52 Units of the United States Air Force
- List of B-47 units of the United States Air Force
- List of B-50 units of the United States Air Force
- List of B-29 Superfortress operators
- B-24 Liberator units of the United States Army Air Forces
