= RAF Hardwick =

Former RAF station in Norfolk, England

RAF Hardwick USAAF Station 104
- Bungay, Norfolk in England
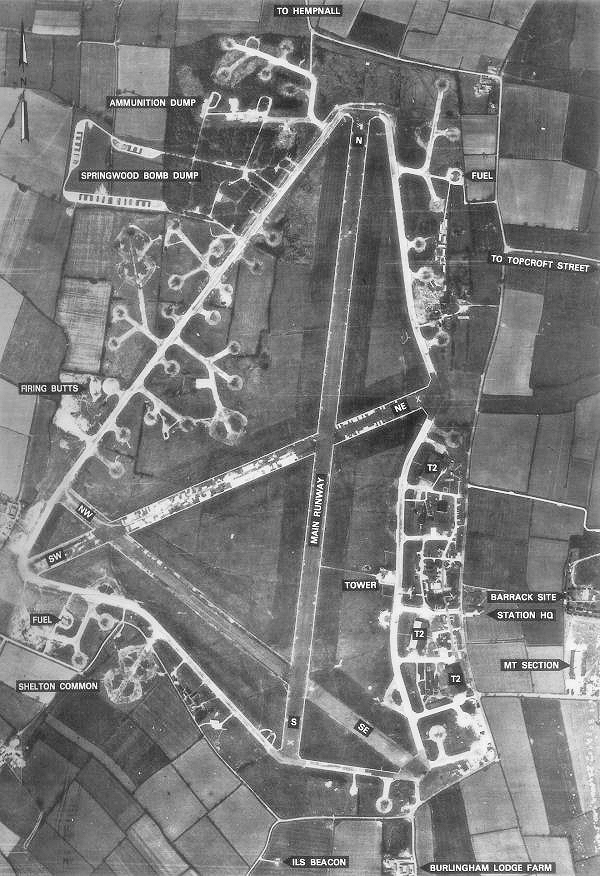
- Hardwick Airfield - 16 April 1946

Site information
- Type: Royal Air Force station
- Owner: Air Ministry
- Operator: United States Army Air Forces
- Controlled by: Eighth Air Force

Location
- Location within Norfolk
- Coordinates: 52°28′14″N 001°18′41″E

Site history
- Built: 1941
- Built by: John Laing & Son Ltd
- In use: 1942-1945
- Battles/wars: European Theatre of World War II; Air Offensive, Europe July 1942 - May 1945

Garrison information
- Garrison: 93rd Bombardment Group

Airfield information
Runways
| Direction | Length and surface |
|---|---|
| 10/28 | 1,850 metres (6,070 ft) Concrete |
| 00/00 | 1,200 metres (3,937 ft) Concrete |
| 00/00 | 1,200 metres (3,937 ft) Concrete |
- Code: HC

Royal Air Force Hardwick or more simply RAF Hardwick is a former Royal Air Force station located between the Norfolk villages of Topcroft and Hardwick in England. It is around 5 miles (8.0 km) west of Bungay, Suffolk.

== History ==
Hardwick Airfield was one of the early heavy bomber airfields which were constructed for the Royal Air Force (RAF) during 1941-42 in the East Anglian area. It was built by John Laing & Son Ltd., and required 4 miles (6.4 km) of surface drains, 13 miles (21 km) of drains, 13 miles (21 km) of roadways, 5 miles (8.0 km) of sewers and 7 miles (11 km) of water mains. A total of 4,750,000 bricks were used in construction of the camp.

Like other heavy bomber fields originally planned for RAF needs and begun at the same time, this airfield had three T-2 hangars grouped together on the administrative and technical site, in this case on the eastern side of the airfield. The technical site was adjacent to the hangars and bordered the country road running from Hempnall to Alburgh.

On the eastern side of this road lay the major part of the camp with domestic sites hidden amongst woodland. One site was located at Topcroft Street. All accommodation was of the temporary type, mostly Nissen huts. The bomb dump was situated off the north-west corner of the airfield in and adjacent to Spring Wood.

== United States Army Air Forces use ==
When assigned to the United States Army Air Forces (USAAF), Hardwick was designated as Station 104. From 7 November 1943 through 12 June 1945, Hardwick served as headquarters for the 20th Combat Bombardment Wing of the 2nd Bomb Division.

Originally, 30 hardstands were planned, sufficient for RAF requirements, but these were increased to fifty for the USAAF Eighth Air Force, thirty-nine being of the early 'frying-pan' type and the remainder loops.

USAAF Station Units assigned to RAF Hardwick were:

- 461st Sub-Depot
- 18th Weather Squadron
- 5th Station Complement Squadron
- Headquarters (20th Combat Bomb Wing)

Regular Army Station Units included:

- 1094th Quartermaster Company
- 1248th Military Police Company
- 1675th Ordnance Supply & Maintenance Company
- 885th Chemical Company (Air Operations)
- 2031st Engineer Fire Fighting Platoon

=== 310th Bombardment Group (Medium) ===
The airfield was opened in September 1942 and was first used by the 310th Bombardment Group (Medium), arriving from Greenville AAB South Carolina. Apparently the 428th Bombardment Squadron of the 310th Bombardment Group was diverted to RAF Bungay. A 12th Air Force film clip indicates that the 310th Bombardment Group was the first 12th Air Force group to leave the United States for Europe and initially arrived in Prestwick, Scotland. Flying the North American B-25 Mitchell medium bomber, the 310th used Hardwick as a transshipment point on its way to Telergma, Algeria as a part of Twelfth Air Force. The last elements of the 310th departed for North Africa in November.

=== 93rd Bombardment Group (Heavy) ===
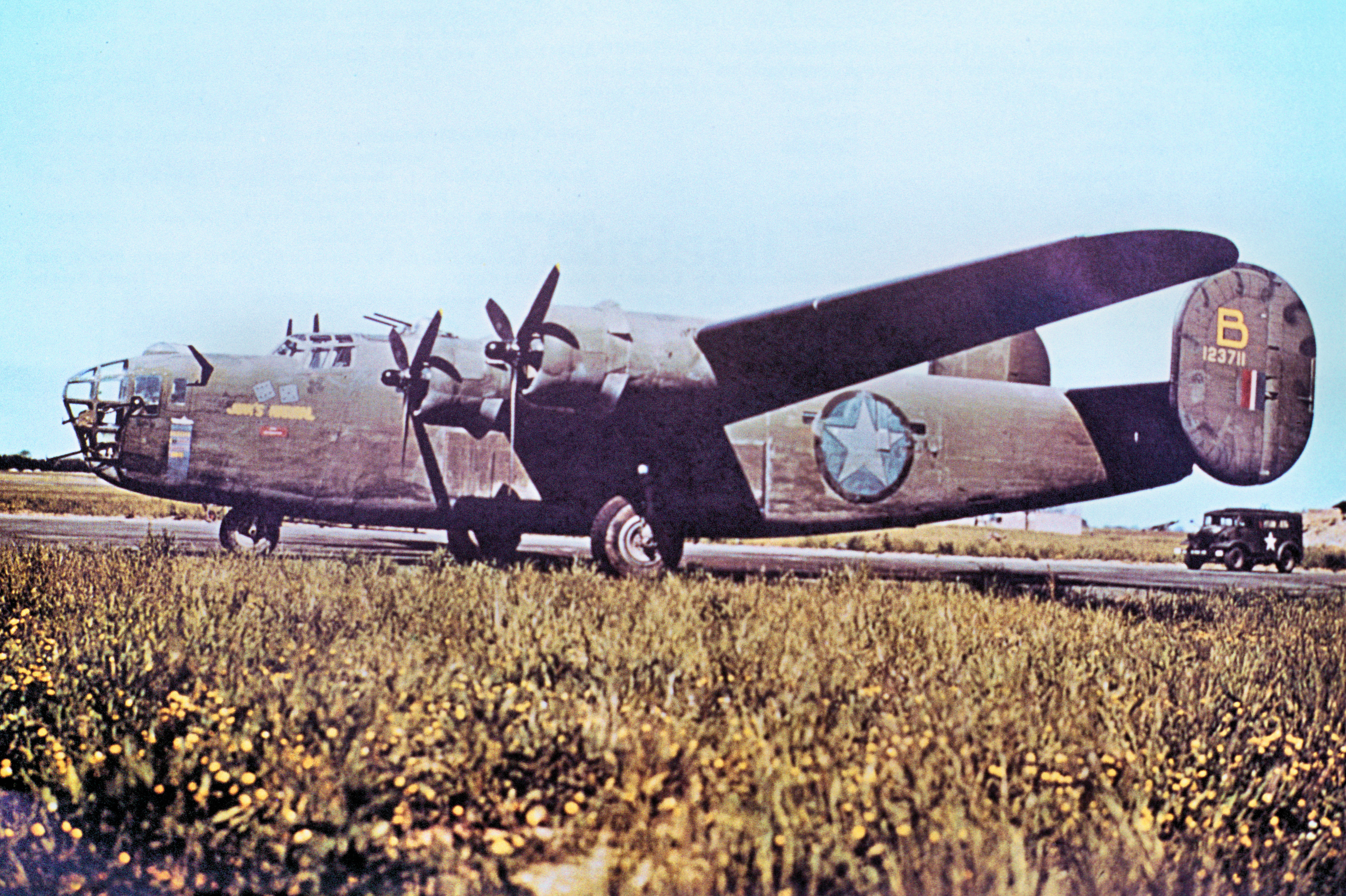
93d Bomb Group Consolidated B-24D-1-CO Liberator Serial 41-23711. This aircraft was lost over Austria 1 October 1943. MACR 3301

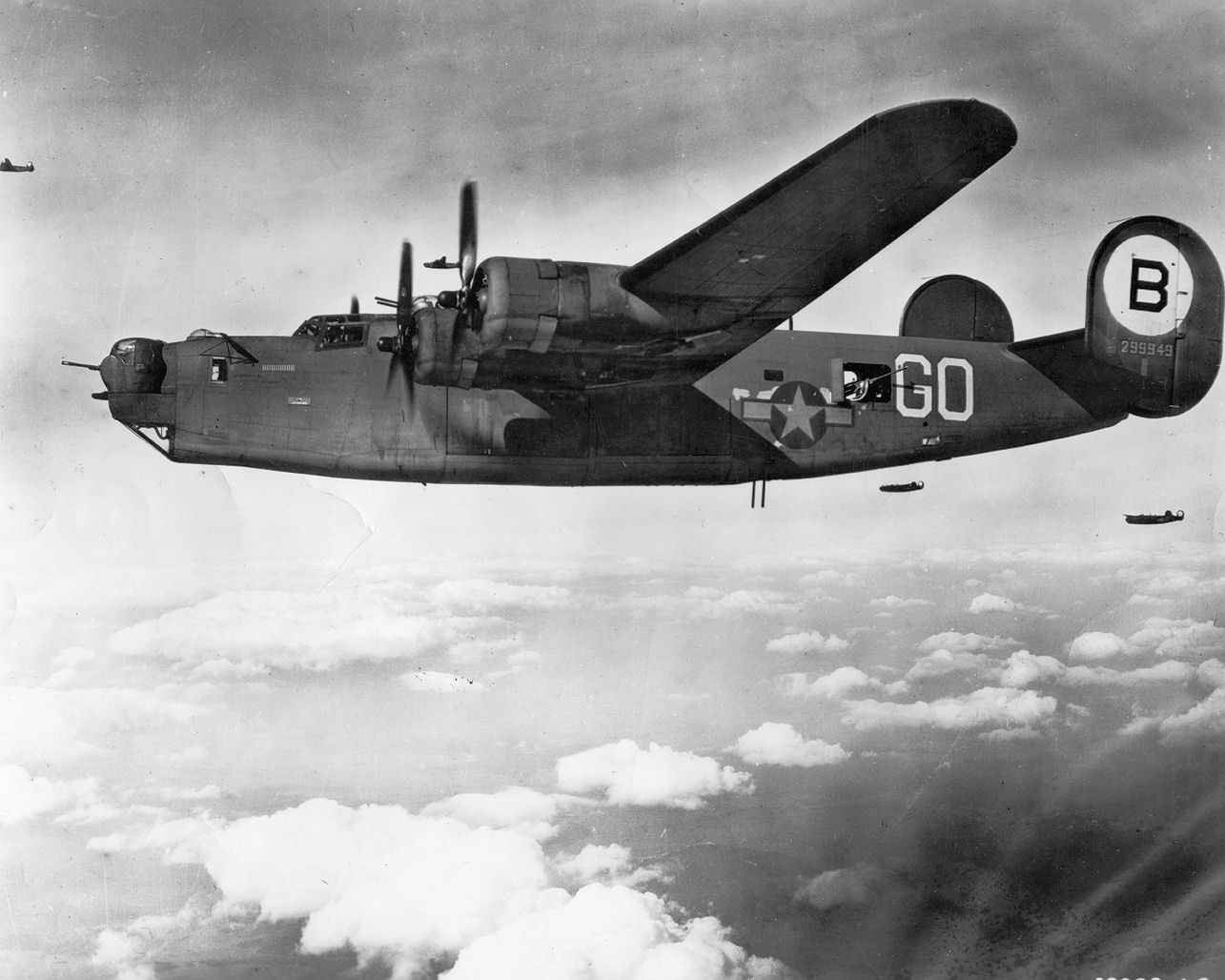
328th Bomb Squadron Consolidated B-24J-55-CO Liberator Serial 42-99949 on a mission to Friedrichshafen Germany during August 1944. This aircraft was lost over Belgium on 21 September 1944, MACR 9662

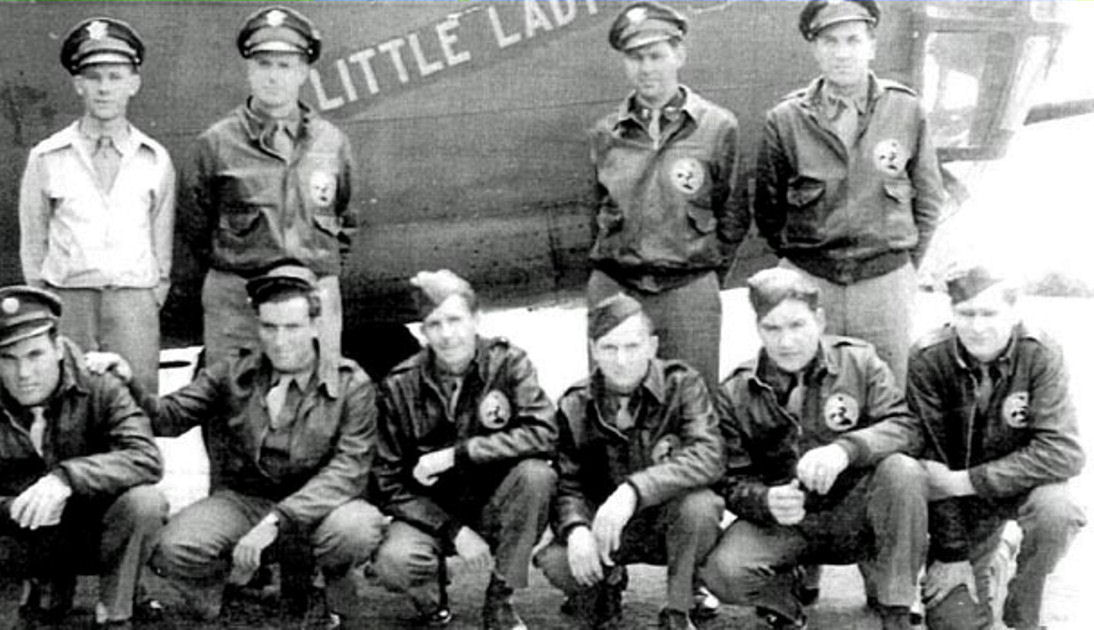
B-24 Liberator 41-23754 'Little Lady' lost on Ploesti raid 1 Aug 1943. Crew interned in Turkey where it crash landed.

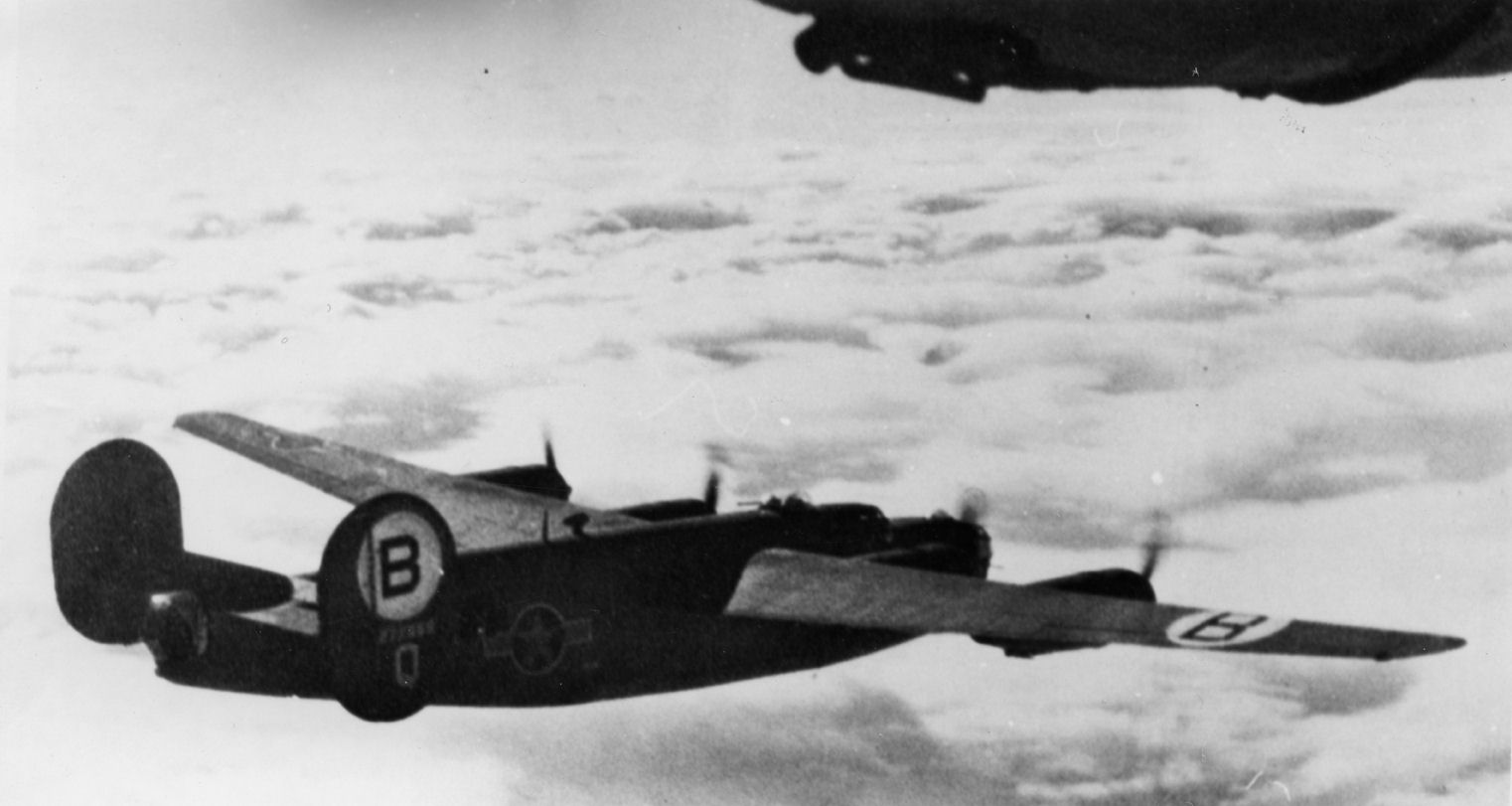
A B-24D Liberator (serial number 42-72869) of the 93rd Bomb Group flies over the cloud layer.

The VIII Bomber Command 93rd Bombardment Group (Heavy) arrived at Hardwick from RAF Alconbury in December 1942. The group was assigned to the 20th Combat Bombardment Wing and the group tail code was a "Circle-B". Its operational squadrons were:

- 328th Bombardment Squadron (GO)
- 329th Bombardment Squadron (RE)
- 330th Bombardment Squadron (AG)
- 409th Bombardment Squadron (YM)

The 93rd flew the Consolidated B-24 Liberator as part of the Eighth Air Force's strategic bombing campaign. The group entered combat on 9 October 1942 by attacking steel and engineering works at Lille. Until December 1942, the group operated primarily against submarine pens in the Bay of Biscay.

A large detachment was sent to North Africa in December 1942, the group receiving a Distinguished Unit Citation for operations in that theatre, December 1942 - February 1943, when, with inadequate supplies and under the most difficult desert conditions, the detachment struck heavy blows at enemy shipping and communications.

The detachment returned to England in February 1943 and until the end of June the group bombed engine repair works, harbours, power plants, and other targets in France, the Low Countries, and Germany.

A detachment returned to the Mediterranean theatre during June and July 1943 to support the Allied invasion of Sicily and to participate in the famous low-level attack on enemy oil installations at Ploesti on 1 August. Having followed another element of the formation along the wrong course to Ploesti, the 93rd hit targets that had been assigned to other groups, but it carried out its bombing of the vital oil installations despite heavy losses inflicted by attacks from the fully alerted enemy and was awarded a Distinguished Unit Citation for the operation.

Lt. Col. Addison E. Baker, group commander, and Major John L. Jerstad, a former member of the group who had volunteered for this mission, were posthumously awarded the Medal of Honor for action in the Ploesti raid. Refusing to make a forced landing in their damaged B-24, these men, as pilot and co-pilot of the lead plane, led the group to bomb the oil facilities before their plane crashed in the target area.

After the detachment returned to England in August 1943, the group flew only two missions before the detachment was sent back to the Mediterranean to support the Fifth Army at Salerno during the invasion of Italy in September 1943.

The detachment rejoined the group in October 1943, and until April 1945 the 93rd concentrated on bombardment of strategic targets such as marshalling yards, aircraft factories, oil refineries, chemical plants, and cities in Germany. In addition it bombed gun emplacements, choke points, and bridges near Cherbourg during the Normandy invasion in June 1944. It attacked troop concentrations in northern France during the Saint-Lô breakthrough in July 1944; transported food, petrol, water, and other supplies to the Allies advancing across France, August - September 1944; dropped supplies to airborne troops in the Netherlands on 18 September 1944; struck enemy transportation and other targets during the Battle of the Bulge, December 1944 - January 1945; and flew two missions on 24 March 1945 during the airborne assault across the Rhine, dropping supplies to troops near Wesel and bombing a night-fighter base at Stormede.

The 93rd Bomb Group ceased combat operations in April 1945, and returned to Sioux Falls Army Airfield, South Dakota during May/June.

==== Legacy ====
In preparation for the Invasion of Japan, the group was redesignated the 93rd Bombardment Group (Very Heavy) in July and converted to Boeing B-29 Superfortresses, being assigned to Pratt Army Airfield in Kansas for training. However, with the end of the war in September, the group was transferred to Clovis Army Airfield in New Mexico and was assigned to Strategic Air Command.

The 93d Bomb Wing was a front-line unit of SAC during the Cold War until its deactivation on 30 September 1995 with the closure of Castle Air Force Base. The unit exists today as the 116th Air Control Wing at Robins Air Force Base, Georgia, being the first United States Air Force wing "blended" from active duty and Air National Guard airmen. The 93d was designated as such on 1 October 2002 following the blending of the active duty 93d Air Control Wing and the ANG 116th Bomb Wing. The wing flies Northrop Grumman E-8 Joint STARS aircraft (converted Boeing 707 airliners) and remains assigned to Eighth Air Force under Air Combat Command.

== Postwar RAF use ==
After the war, the field was turned over to the RAF on 25 June 1945. The station was immediately put into care and maintenance status, and was eventually closed in 1962.

== Civil use ==
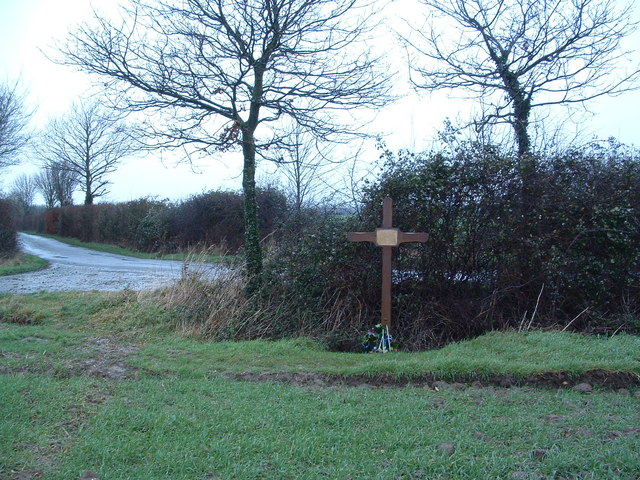
Memorial To Aircrew. Memorial to aircrew killed during take off 19 Dec. 1944 in a field near the end of the runway more info on the airfield.

With the end of military control, the main airfield buildings, hangars, control tower, etc., were demolished. However, on some of the dispersed sites to the east of the airfield quite a number of the buildings remain and are used by a farmer for a variety of purposes.

Most of the hardstands have gone. The main runways (with the exception of one which remains almost complete) and taxiways were broken up for aggregate and used for various construction projects.

A stone memorial plaque was dedicated during a veterans' reunion in 1987. It stands in a small plot on one of the old barrack sites just off the lane from Hempnall which runs to the east of the airfield.

A small private museum has been established in some of the remaining Nissen huts on one of the dispersed sites on Airfield Farm. It contains general 8th A.F. memorabilia, material on the 93rd B.G., and items recovered by the East Anglian Aircraft Research Group.

A company by the name of Mindacre Ltd., run by Roy Slarke of Bungay, used the airfield as their main base for aerial application operations, and had at one time six Cessna A188 Agwagons stationed at field. Pilots and engineers from both the UK, Norway, Australia and New Zealand had Hardwick as their home base, and carried out aerial application contracts all over the UK.

In 1973 the company won a contract spraying cotton fields in the Gezira, Sudan, Africa, and four Agwagons and one Cessna 206 departed Hardwick and flew to the Sudan, returning six months later. Cpt. Harald Olsen of Norway worked for Mindacre Ltd., from 1972 until completion of the contract in the Sudan in 1974.

== See also ==
- List of former Royal Air Force stations
