= 859th Special Operations Squadron =

859th Special Operations Squadron

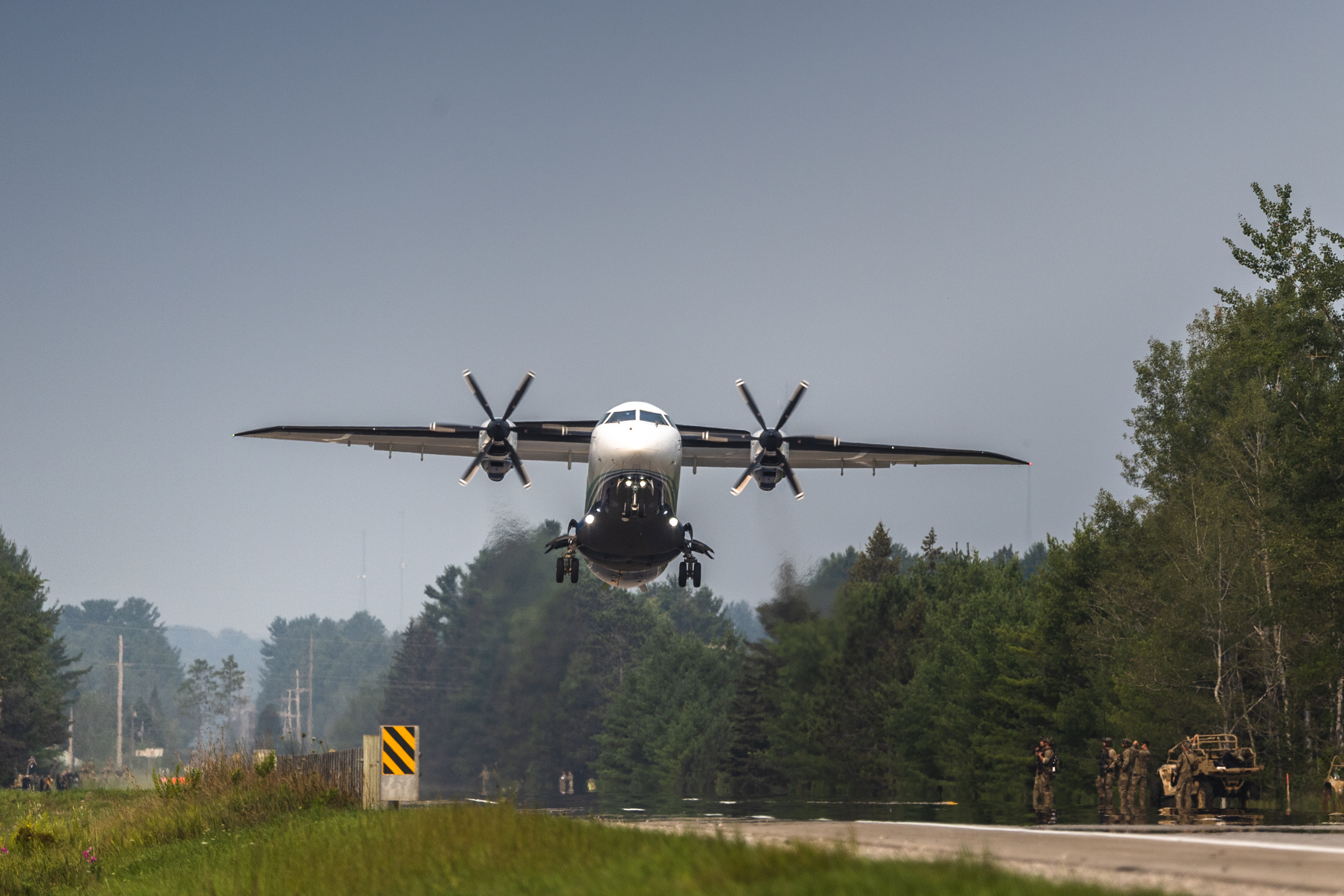
- C-146A Wolfhound takes off from a highway
- Active: 1942–1945; 2016–present
- Country: United States
- Branch: United States Air Force
- Role: Special Operations
- Part of: Air Force Reserve Command
- Garrison/HQ: Duke Field, Florida
- Engagements: European Theater of Operations; Mediterranean Theater of Operations
- Decorations: French Croix de Guerre with Palm

Insignia
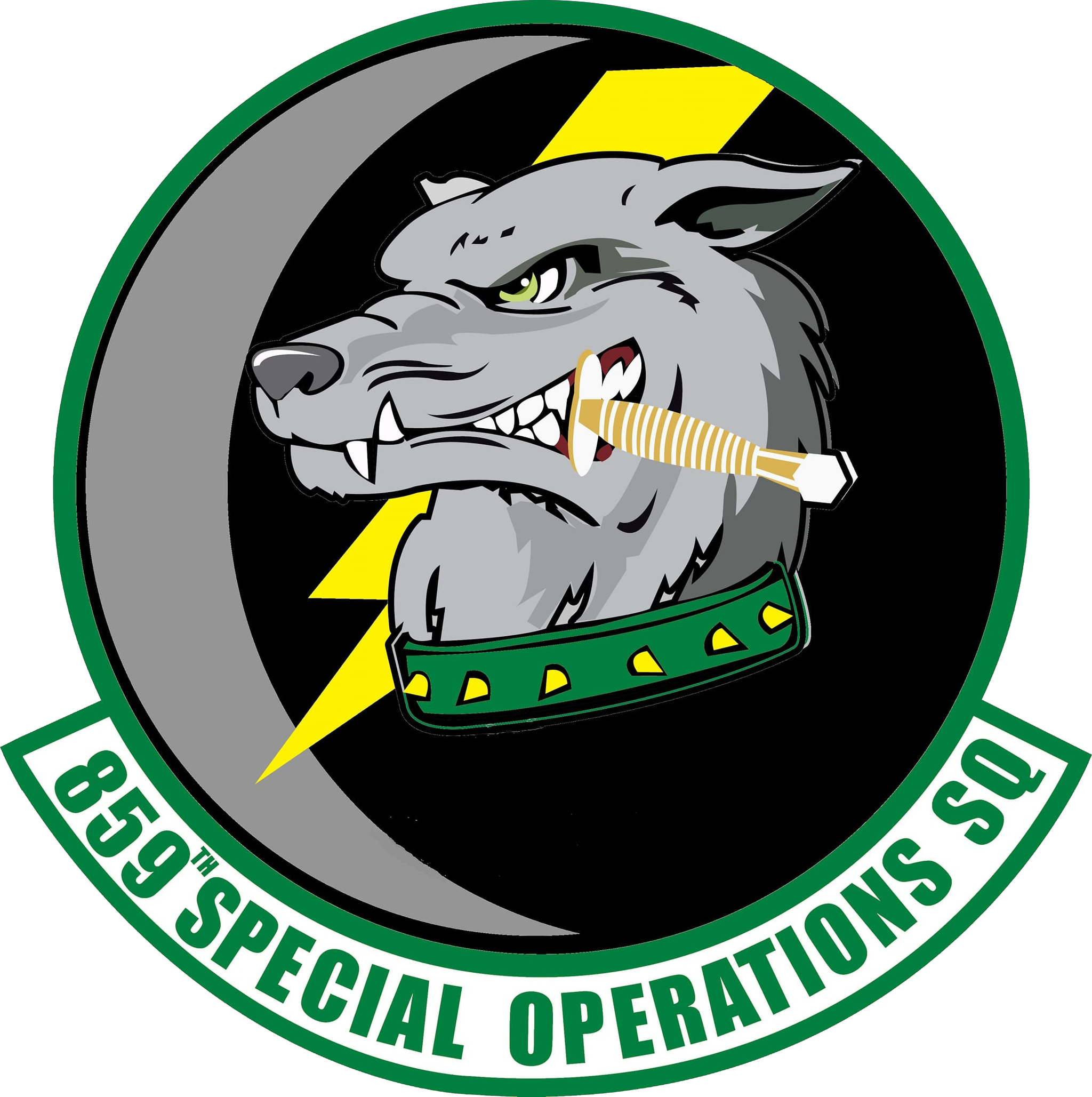
- 859th Special Operations Squadron emblem

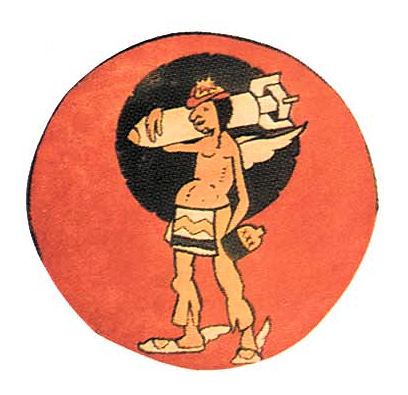
- 859th Bombardment Squadron emblem (Note: This emblem was never approved for the squadron, although it was used. The emblem had been used earlier by the 788th Bombardment Squadron while flying Carpetbagger missions and was ultimately approved for the 788th Squadron in June 1945. Maurer, Combat Squadrons, p. 756.)

The 859th Special Operations Squadron is a reserve unit of the United States Air Force. It was first activated in October 1942 as the 517th Bombardment Squadron, when the Army Air Forces replaced National Guard observation units that had been mobilized and were performing antisubmarine patrols off the Atlantic coastline. A month after its activation, the squadron was redesignated the 12th Antisubmarine Squadron. In August 1943, the Army Air forces began turning the antisubmarine patrol mission over to the Navy and the squadron moved to California, where, as the 859th Bombardment Squadron, it formed the cadre for the 492d Bombardment Group.

After deploying to England, the 492d entered the strategic bombing campaign against Germany, but in three months of combat, suffered the most severe losses of an Eighth Air Force bomber group. The 492d Group was withdrawn from combat in August 1944, and the 859th moved on paper to replace the 788th Bombardment Squadron, which was engaged in Operation Carpetbagger, dropping agents and supplies behind German lines, primarily in France. As American forces advanced in France, this special operations mission diminished. The squadron moved to Italy, where it performed the same mission in the Balkans and Italy. The squadron was inactivated in Italy in October 1945.

The squadron was redesignated the 859th Special Operations Squadron and activated in 2016 as an associate of the 524th Special Operations Squadron, performing the Non-Standard Aviation mission.

== Mission ==
In association with active duty units, performs the Non-Standard Aviation mission. Non-Standard Aviation refers to operations performed by aircraft used by Air Force Special Operations Command to support austere and remote locations not serviced by reliable and safe commercial aviation runway environments. The squadron operates the Dornier C-146 Wolfhound. The Wolfhound provides United States Special Operations Command flexible movement of small special operations teams to support theater special operations commands.

== History ==
=== Antisubmarine campaign ===
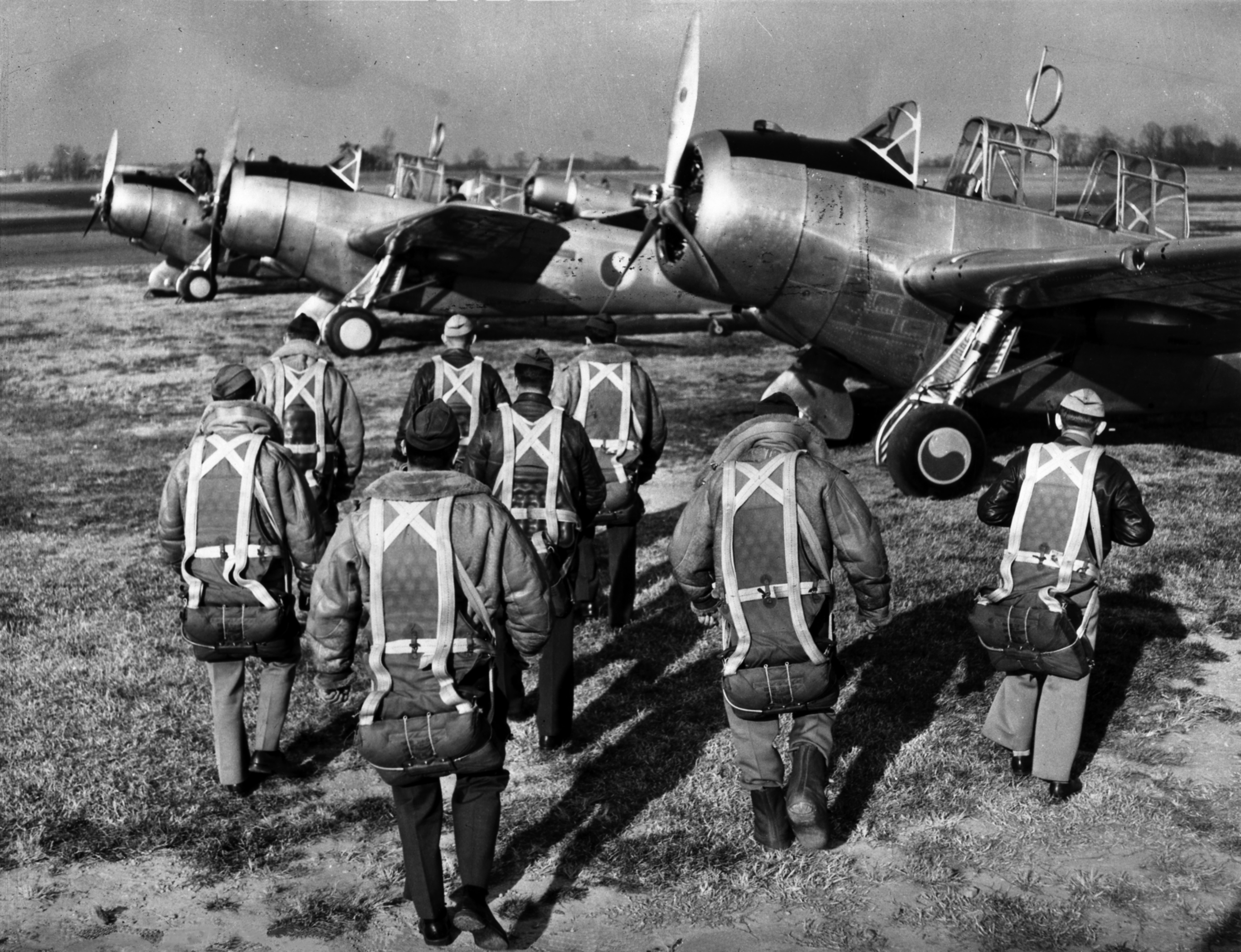
104th Observation Squadron O-47s

The squadron was first activated at Atlantic City Airport, New Jersey as the 517th Bombardment Squadron on 18 October 1942, when the 377th Bombardment Group replaced the 59th Observation Group at Fort Dix Army Air Field and assumed its mission, personnel and equipment. It was initially equipped with the Stinson Vigilants, Douglas O-46s and North American O-47s of the 104th Observation Squadron, which it replaced at Atlantic City. but converted to Douglas B-18 Bolos and North American B-25 Mitchells the following year. The squadrons of the 377th Group were at various bases along the coast between Delaware and New Hampshire.

In October 1942, the Army Air Forces organized its antisubmarine forces into the single Army Air Forces Antisubmarine Command, which established the 25th Antisubmarine Wing the following month to control its forces operating over the Atlantic. Its bombardment group headquarters, including the 377th, were inactivated and the squadron, now designated the 12th Antisubmarine Squadron, was assigned directly to the 25th Wing. The squadron moved to Langley Field, Virginia in January 1943. In July 1943, the AAF and Navy reached an agreement to transfer the coastal antisubmarine mission to the Navy. This mission transfer also included an exchange of AAF long-range bombers equipped for antisubmarine warfare for Navy Consolidated B-24 Liberators without such equipment.

=== Conversion to heavy bomber and training ===
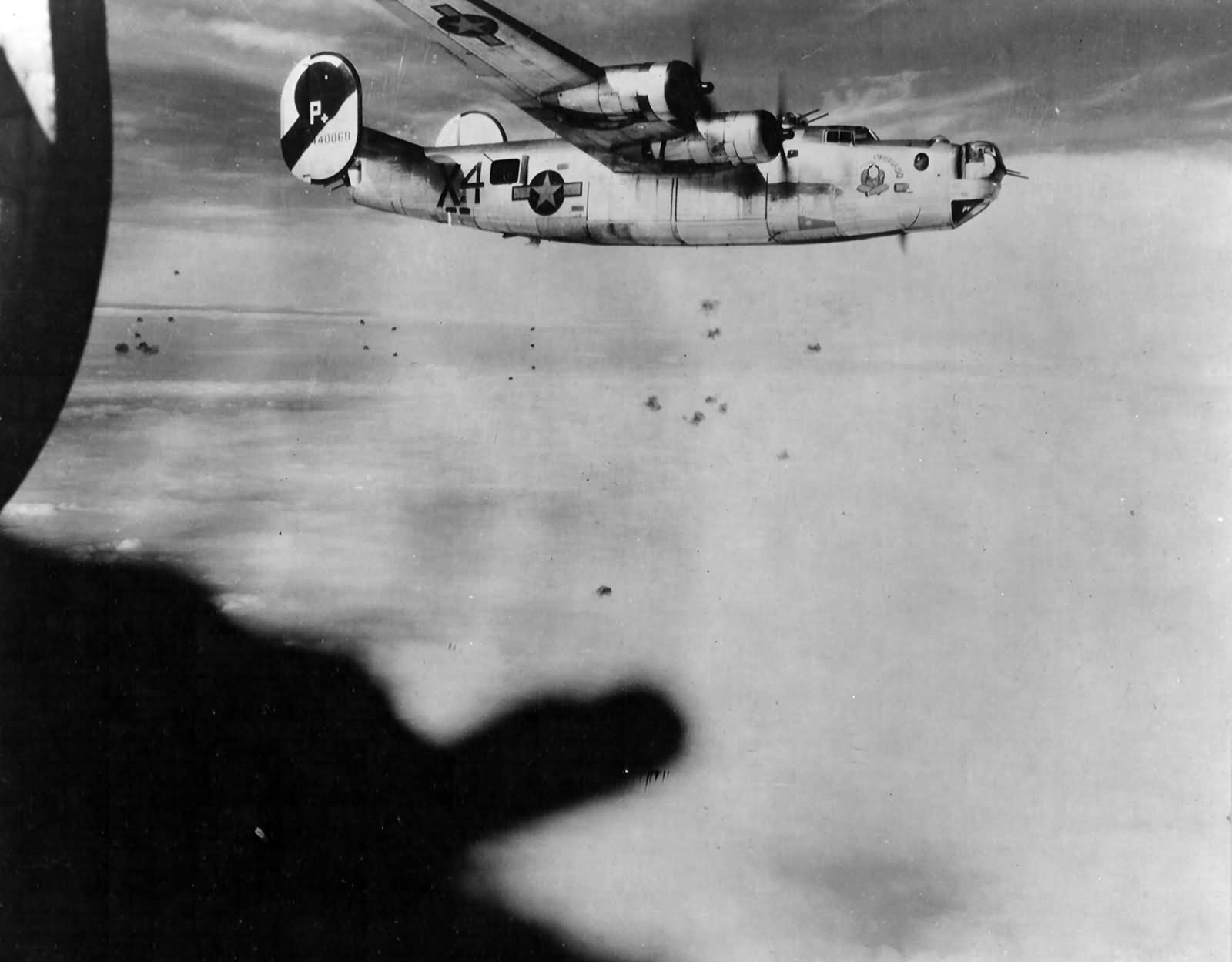
B-24J Liberator flown by the squadron (Note: Aircraft is Consolidated B-24J-145-CO Liberator, serial 44-40068. Umbriago. The plane was transferred to the 708th Bombardment Squadron and was lost on 17 February 1945 over the North Sea, possibly due to severe icing. MACR 12431; Baugher, Joe (6 April 2023). "1944 USAF Serial Numbers". Joe Baugher..)

In September 1943, the squadron moved to Blythe Army Air Base, California, where its personnel were used as the cadre for the 492d Bombardment Group, which was being formed at Alamogordo Army Air Field, New Mexico. It was redesignated the 859th Bombardment Squadron and then, on 1 October, assigned to the 492d Group. In December it joined group headquarters and the other three squadron of the 492d at Alamogordo, where they were conducting Consolidated B-24 Liberator training.

By January 1944, most of the ground echelon of the squadron had been used to form other bomber units. 2d Bombardment Division, which controlled VIII Bomber Command's Liberator units in England, began to form new ground echelons from personnel of bomber units already in England, while the air echelon of the 859th continued training at Alamogordo. The air echelon began to depart Alamogordo on 1 April 1944, following the southern ferry route, while the few remaining members of the ground echelon departed on 11 April, sailing on the RMS Queen Elizabeth on 20 April.

=== Strategic bomber operations ===
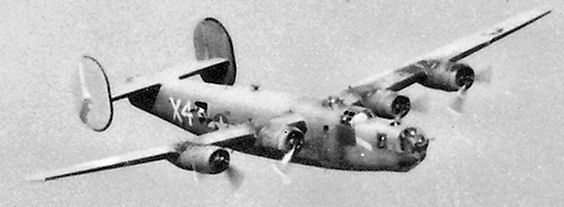
Squadron B-24 Liberatory (Note: Aircraft is Consolidated B-24J-140-CO Liberator, serial 42-110141, Breezy Lady. This plane was transferred to the 752d Bombardment Squadron and modified as an Azon plane. It retained the name Breezy Lady painted on the port side. Superman was later added to the starboard side. Later the Breezy Lady side was changed to Marie. It survived the war and returned to the United States in 1945. Baugher, Joe (7 March 2023). "1942 USAF Serial Numbers". Joe Baugher.)

On 14 April, the ground echelon that had been formed in England arrived at RAF North Pickenham (Note: Although North Pickenham had been the squadron's nominal station since 1 January, it was actually being assembled at other 2d Bombardment Division stations. Freeman, p. 262.) The air echelon began arriving on 18 April. The squadron flew its first combat mission on 11 May 1944, joining the strategic bombing campaign with attacks primarily on targets in central Germany. During the first week in June, the squadron was diverted from strategic targets to support Operation Overlord by attacking airfields and V-1 flying bomb and V-2 rocket launch sites. It bombed coastal defenses in Normandy on D-Day, 6 June 1944, and continued interdiction attacks until the middle of the month. Except for support of Operation Cobra, the breakout at Saint Lo, the squadron then resumed bombardment of strategic targets in Germany. However, during its three months of strategic operations the 492d Group suffered the heaviest losses of any Eighth Air Force group. On 5 August, the decision was made to withdraw the 492d Group from combat. The group's heavy losses had begun with one of the group's earliest missions, an attack on Braunschweig, in which it lost eight Liberators to enemy interceptors. When the 492d Group returned to strategic operation, on 20 June Luftwaffe fighters, primarily Messerschmitt Bf 110s, using air to air rockets shot down fourteen of the 492d Group's B-24s. Heavy losses, this time to fighters from Jagdgeschwader 3, were again suffered on 29 June. (Note: Superstitious persons speculated that the hard luck group reputation had passed from the 44th Bombardment Group to the 392d Bombardment Group and it was now resting on the 492d Group. Freeman, p. 160. Others speculated that the Luftwaffe was concentrating on the 492d Group because it was the first Liberator group to arrive in the theater with uncamouflaged B-24s. However, other groups were receiving uncamouflaged planes to replace their losses. Postwar review of Luftwaffe records does not support the theory that the Luftwaffe singled out any unit for particular attention. However, Luftwaffe fighter controllers, naturally, directed fighters to what they perceived as the most vulnerable portions of the American bomber formations, a position that the 492d Group seems to have occupied a disproportionate number of times. Freeman, p. 172.)

=== Special operations ===
The squadron transferred to RAF Harrington on 1 August 1944, where it replaced the 788th Bombardment Squadron, which moved on paper to RAF Rackheath and was assigned to the 467th Bombardment Group there. Although nominally a move without personnel or equipment, some low mission crews and aircraft from the entire 492d Bomb Group moved to Harrington and were assigned to the 859th Squadron on arrival. The squadron operated chiefly over southern France with B-24s and a few Douglas C-47 Skytrains, engaging in Operation Carpetbagger missions, dropping agents and supplies behind enemy lines. As the Allies advanced across northern France, and with Operation Dragoon placing Allied forces in southern France, full scale Carpetbagger operations wound down by 16 September. This support for the French Resistance earned the squadron the French Croix de Guerre with Palm. With the drawdown of the Carpetbagger mission, the squadron concentrated on hauling gasoline to advancing mechanized forces in France and Belgium. During its assignment to special operations form England, the squadron flew 179 sorties and delivered 121 "Joes", as the agents were called. It also flew a small number of "Nickling" missions (dropping propaganda leaflets).

Even as the need for guerilla support in France was decreasing, it was increasing in the Mediterranean. On 17 December 1944, the 859th departed England, arriving at its new home, Brindisi Airfield, Italy three days later. The 859th's first sortie out of Brindisi was flown on 29 December 1944. A total of six successful sorties were flown that day into Yugoslavia followed the next day by six sortie attempts to targets in Italy. Weather, a mechanical failure, and a reception failure caused all but two of these to fail. In January 1945, the squadron was attached to the newly-formed 15th Special Group (Provisional) along with the 885th Bombardment Squadron, which had been operating from Brindisi since October 1944. For the most part, the 859th operated in Yugoslavia, while the 885th operated in Italy. Most supply drops were made in the Zagreb region, where partisans were attacking German forces withdrawing up the Sava River valley. On 20 May 1945, thirteen days after V-E Day, the 859th moved to Gioia del Colle Airfield and from there to Bari Airfield Italy in July 1945 where it remained until October 1945 when it was inactivated.

=== Air Force Reserves ===
The unit was reactivated in the Air Force reserve as the 859th Special Operations Squadron, marked by a ceremony at Duke Field, Florida, on April 1, 2016. The unit was formed from the assets of Detachment 1, 919th Special Operations Group. It is an associate of the 524th Special Operations Squadron at Cannon Air Force Base, New Mexico.

== Lineage ==
- Constituted as the 517th Bombardment Squadron (Heavy) on 13 October 1942 (Note: Maurer has the constitution date in 1943. This is an obvious typographical error.)

Activated on 18 October 1942
Redesignated 12th Antisubmarine Squadron (Heavy) on 29 November 1942
Redesignated 859th Bombardment Squadron, Heavy on 24 September 1943
Inactivated on 4 October 1945
Redesignated 859th Special Operations Squadron
Activated c. 1 April 2016

=== Assignments ===
- 377th Bombardment Group, 18 October 1942
- 25th Antisubmarine Wing, c. 9 December 1942
- 492d Bombardment Group, 1 October 1943 (attached to 15th Special Group (Provisional) (later 2641st Special Group (Provisional)), 17 December 1944 (Note: Maurer dates the attachment to the 15th Special Group from the date of the squadron's arrival in Italy. However, Fifteenth Air Force did not organize the group until 20 January 1945. While in the Mediterranean theater and before the organization of the 15th Special Group, the squadron was under the operational control of Fifteenth Air Force. Warren, p. 25.)
- United States Strategic Air Forces, 14 August–4 October 1945
- 919th Special Operations Group, c. 1 April 2016

=== Stations ===
- Atlantic City Airport, New Jersey, 18 October 1942
- Langley Field, Virginia, 12 January–18 September 1943
- Blythe Army Air Field, California, 24 September 1943
- Alamogordo Army Air Field, New Mexico, 9 December 1943 – 1 January 1944
- RAF North Pickenham (AAF-143), England, 1 January 1944 (Note: The reformed ground echelon only was at North Pickenham on this date. The air echelon remained at Alamogordo until April 1944. Freeman, p. 262.)
- RAF Harrington (AAF-179), England, 1 August-17 December 1944
- Brindisi Airfield, Italy, 20 December 1944
- Rosignano Airfield, Italy, 24 March 1945
- Gioia del Colle Airfield, Italy, 20 May 1945
- Bari Airfield, Italy, 20 July – 4 October 1945
- Duke Field, Florida c. 1 April 2016 – present

=== Aircraft ===
- Stinson Vigilant, 1942–1943
- Douglas O-46, 1942–1943
- North American O-47, 1942–1943
- Douglas B-18 Bolo, 1943
- North American B-25 Mitchell, 1943
- Consolidated B-24 Liberator, 1943–1945
- Douglas C-47 Skytrain, 1944–1945

=== Awards and campaigns ===
Award streamer	Award	Dates	Notes
	French Croix de Guerre with Palm	6 August 1944-16 September 1944	859th Bombardment Squadron

Campaign Streamer	Campaign	Dates	Notes
	Antisubmarine	18 October 1942 – 1 August 1943	517th Bombardment Squadron (later 12th Antisubmarine Squadron)
	Air Offensive, Europe	1 January 1944 – 5 June 1944	859th Bombardment Squadron
	Air Combat, EAME Theater	1 January 1944 – 11 May 1945	859th Bombardment Squadron
	Central Europe	22 March 1944 – 21 May 1945	859th Bombardment Squadron
	Normandy	6 June 1944 – 24 July 1944	859th Bombardment Squadron
	Northern France	25 July 1944 – 14 September 1944	859th Bombardment Squadron
	Southern France	15 August 1944 – 14 September 1944	859th Bombardment Squadron
	Rhineland	15 September 1944 – 21 March 1945	859th Bombardment Squadron
	North Apennines	20 December 1944 – 4 April 1945	859th Bombardment Squadron
	Po Valley	3 April 1945 – 8 May 1945	859th Bombardment Squadron

== See also ==
- B-24 Liberator units of the United States Army Air Forces
- List of Douglas C-47 Skytrain operators
