= 788 Squadron =

788 Squadron may refer to:

- 788 Naval Air Squadron, United Kingdom
- 788th Bombardment Squadron, later 788th Tactical Fighter Squadron, United States
