= 789th Bombardment Squadron =

789th Bombardment Squadron (later 789th Tactical Fighter Squadron)
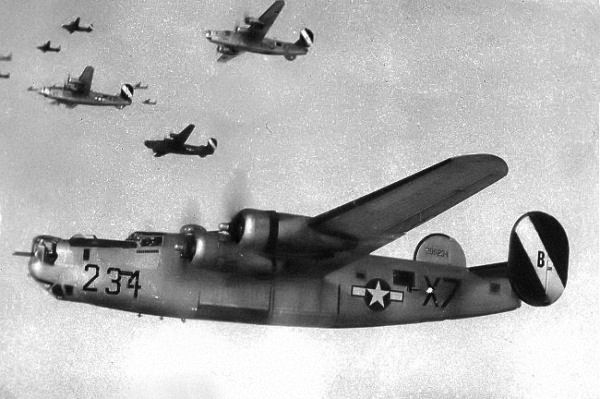
- 467th Bombardment Group B-24 Liberators in combat formation (Note: The aircraft in the foreground is Ford Motors built Consolidated B-24H-25-FO Liberator, serial 42-95234. This aircraft survived the war and returned to the United States on 11 June 1945. Baugher, Joe (15 July 2023). "1942 USAF Serial Numbers". Joe Baugher.)
- Active: 1943–1946; 1965
- Country: United States
- Branch: United States Air Force
- Role: Bombardment, Fighter
- Engagements: European Theater of Operations

Insignia
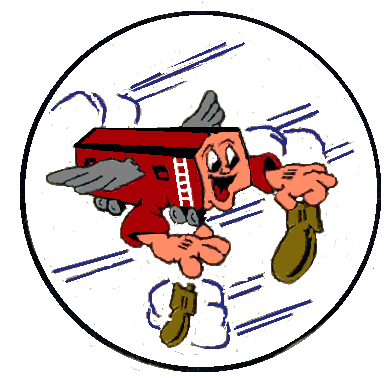
- 789th Bombardment Squadron emblem (Note: Approved 19 January 1945. Description: On a white disc, edged black, a caricatured red box car with gray wings and wheels, having a caricatured tan face and hands, in flight toward sinister base, dropping a green aerial bomb with the right hand and aiming a like aerial bomb with the left hand, all in front of a medium blue cloud formation.)
- World War II fuselage code: 6A

The 789th Tactical Fighter Squadron is an inactive United States Air Force unit. During World War II, as the 789th Bombardment Squadron, it was assigned to the 467th Bombardment Group as a Consolidated B-24 Liberator squadron in 1943. After training in the United States, it moved to the European Theater of Operations the following year, where it participated in the strategic bombing campaign against Germany. It saw combat until the surrender of Germany in May 1945. After V-E Day, the squadron returned to the United States and transitioned into the Boeing B-29 Superfortress It was inactivated on 4 August 1946 at Clovis Army Air Field, New Mexico.

The squadron was redesignated the 789th Tactical Fighter Squadron and activated in April 1965 as part of the 33d Tactical Fighter Wing. It began to train with the McDonnell F-4 Phantom II, but less than three months after activation, it was inactivated and its Phantoms, personnel and mission were transferred to the 40th Tactical Fighter Squadron.

== History ==
=== World War II ===
==== Training in the United States and deployment ====
The squadron was first activated at Wendover Field, Utah on 1 August 1943 as one of the original four squadrons of the 467th Bombardment Group. It trained with Consolidated B-24 Liberator heavy bombers until February 1944, when it departed for the European Theater of Operations. The ground echelon departed Wendover on 12 February for the port of embarkation at Camp Shanks, New York, sailing aboard the USAT Frederick Lykes on 28 February. The air echelon ferried their Liberators to England via the South Atlantic Ferry route.

==== Combat in Europe ====
The squadron arrived at its combat station, RAF Rackheath, England, on 11 March 1944, and entered the strategic bombing campaign on 10 April with an attack on a military air base at Bourges. It attacked targets such as factories at Bonn, Osnabrück and Stuttgart, power generating facilities at Hamm, and the harbor at Kiel. It also attacked the German aircraft industry at Brunswick, and other objectives. In September 1944, the squadron spent some time transporting fuel to France to support the Allied advance toward Germany.

The squadron was occasionally diverted from the strategic campaign to engage in air support and air interdiction missions. On D-Day, it attacked shore installations and bridges near Cherbourg Naval Base. During Operation Cobra, the breakout at Saint Lo, it bombed troop concentrations and supply dumps near Montreuil. It attacked German lines of communication and fortifications during the Battle of the Bulge from December 1944 through January 1945. It bombed enemy transportation to assist Operation Varsity, the airborne assault across the Rhine in March 1945. The squadron flew its last combat mission on 25 April 1945.

==== Return to the United States and inactivation ====
Following V-E Day, the squadron redeployed to the United States. Most of the squadron's planes left Rackheath on 12 June 1945, while the ground echelon sailed on the RMS Queen Mary on 6 July. The squadron began to reassemble at Sioux Falls Army Air Field, South Dakota later in July. The squadron was selected for transition into the Boeing B-29 Superfortress and trained with the new bomber at Alamogordo Army Air Field, New Mexico and Harvard Army Air Field, Nebraska, although Japan had surrendered. The squadron completed its transition into the Superfortress and, in January 1946, moved to Clovis Army Air Field, New Mexico, where it became one of the first units in Strategic Air Command. On 4 August 1946, the squadron was inactivated and its mission, personnel and equipment were transferred to the 352d Bombardment Squadron, which was simultaneously activated.

=== Fighter operations ===
As the United States Air Force expanded its McDonnell F-4 Phantom II fleet in April 1965, it activated the 33d Tactical Fighter Wing at Eglin Air Force Base Florida. Although it was planned that the squadrons of the 33d Wing would be Convair F-102 Delta Dagger squadrons that were inactivating in the Pacific, these squadrons were still winding down their operations, so the 33d was initially formed with the 786th, 787th, 788th and 789th Tactical Fighter Squadron. The 33d embarked on a program of tactical training with the Phantom. In June 1965, the squadron was inactivated and its planes and personnel were transferred to the 40th Tactical Fighter Squadron, which moved on paper to Eglin from Yokota Air Base, Japan.

== Lineage ==
- Constituted as the 789th Bombardment Squadron (Heavy) on 19 May 1943

Activated on 1 August 1943
Redesignated 789th Bombardment Squadron, Heavy c. 10 August 1944
Redesignated 789th Bombardment Squadron, Very Heavy on 5 August 1945
Inactivated on 4 August 1946

- Redesignated 789th Tactical Fighter Squadron on 9 February 1965 and activated (not organized)

Organized on 1 April 1965
Inactivated on 20 June 1965

=== Assignments ===
- 467th Bombardment Group, 1 August 1943 – 4 August 1946
- Tactical Air Command, 9 February 1965 (not organized)
- 33d Tactical Fighter Wing, 1 April 1965 – 20 June 1965

=== Stations ===
- Wendover Field, Utah, 1 August 1943
- Mountain Home Army Air Field, Idaho, 8 September 1943
- Kearns Army Air Base, Utah 17 October 1943
- Wendover Field, Utah, 2 November 1943 – 12 February 1944
- RAF Rackheath (AAF-145), England, 11 March 1944 – 12 June 1945
- Sioux Falls Army Air Field, South Dakota, 15 July 1945
- Fairmont Army Air Field, Nebraska, 25 July 1945
- Alamogordo Army Air Field, New Mexico, 22 August 1945
- Harvard Army Air Field, Nebraska, 8 September 1945
- Clovis Army Air Field, New Mexico, 7 January–4 August 1946
- Eglin Air Force Base, 1 April 1965 – 20 June 1965

=== Aircraft ===
- Consolidated B-24 Liberator, 1943–1945
- Boeing B-17 Flying Fortress, 1945–1946
- Boeing B-29 Superfortress, 1946
- McDonnell F-4 Phantom II, 1965

=== Campaigns ===
Campaign Streamer	Campaign	Dates	Notes
	Air Offensive, Europe	12 March 1944 – 5 June 1944	789th Bombardment Squadron
	Normandy	6 June 1944 – 24 July 1944	789th Bombardment Squadron
	Northern France	25 July 1944 – 14 September 1944	789th Bombardment Squadron
	Rhineland	15 September 1944 – 21 March 1945	789th Bombardment Squadron
	Ardennes-Alsace	16 December 1944 – 25 January 1945	789th Bombardment Squadron
	Central Europe	22 March 1944 – 21 May 1945	789th Bombardment Squadron

== See also ==
- B-24 Liberator units of the United States Army Air Forces
- B-17 Flying Fortress units of the United States Army Air Forces
- List of B-29 Superfortress operators
- List of F-4 Phantom II operators
