= 791st Bombardment Squadron =

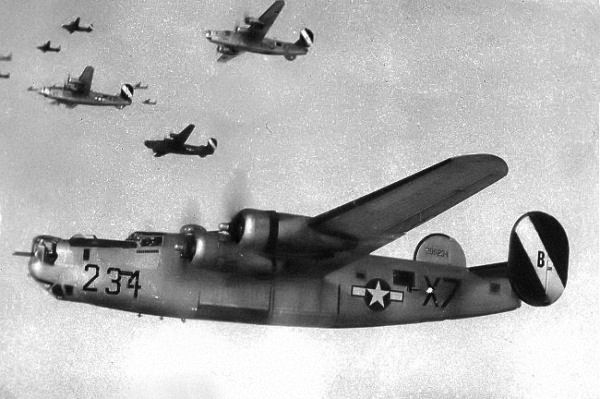
- 467th Bombardment Group Consolidated B-24 Liberators in combat formation (Note: The aircraft in the foreground is Ford Motors built Consolidated B-24H-25-FO Liberator, serial 42-95234. This aircraft survived the war and returned to the United States on 11 June 1945. Baugher, Joe (15 July 2023). "1942 USAF Serial Numbers". Joe Baugher.)
- Active: 1943–1946
- Country: United States
- Branch: United States Air Force
- Role: heavy bomber
- Engagements: European Theater of Operations

Insignia
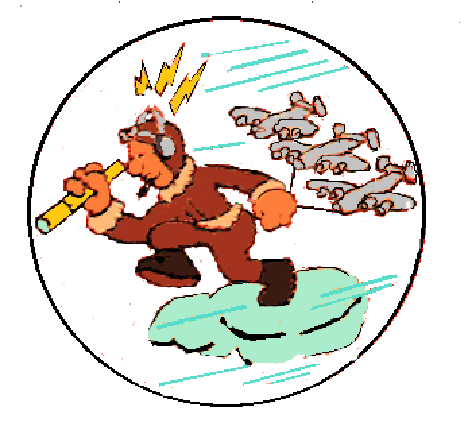
- 791st Bombardment Squadron emblem (Note: Approved 7 March 1945. Description: On a white disc flecked with horizontal lines of turquoise blue, edged black, a caricatured figure in tan and brown flight suit, helmet, and boots, wearing a gray headset, having three yellow electrical flashes emanating therefrom, and gray goggles, running toward dexter over small light turquoise blue cloud formation in base, smoking a cigar and peering through a black and yellow telescope held in the right hand, and towing three B-24 aircraft attached to strings held in the left hand.)
- World War II fuselage code: 4Z

The 791st Bombardment Squadron is a former United States Army Air Forces unit. During World War II it was assigned to the 467th Bombardment Group, and engaged in the strategic bombing campaign against Germany. After V-E Day, the squadron returned to the United States and transitioned into the Boeing B-29 Superfortress. It was inactivated on 31 March 1946 at Roswell Army Air Field, New Mexico in March 1946 and its resources were transferred elsewhere.

== History ==
=== Training in the United States and deployment ===
The squadron was first activated at Wendover Field, Utah on 1 August 1943 as one of the original four squadrons of the 467th Bombardment Group. It trained with Consolidated B-24 Liberator heavy bombers until February 1944, when it departed for the European Theater of Operations. The ground echelon departed Wendover on 12 February for the port of embarkation at Camp Shanks, New York, sailing aboard the USAT Frederick Lykes on 28 February. The air echelon ferried their Liberators to England via the South Atlantic Ferry route.

=== Combat in Europe ===
The squadron arrived at its combat station, RAF Rackheath, England, on 11 March 1944, and entered the strategic bombing campaign on 10 April with an attack on a military air base at Bourges. It attacked targets such as factories at Bonn, Osnabrück and Stuttgart, power generating facilities at Hamm, and the harbor at Kiel. It also attacked the German aircraft industry at Brunswick, and other objectives. In September 1944, the squadron spent some time transporting fuel to France to support the Allied advance toward Germany.

The squadron was occasionally diverted from the strategic campaign to engage in air support and air interdiction missions. On D-Day, it attacked shore installations and bridges near Cherbourg-en-Cotentin. During Operation Cobra, the breakout at Saint Lo, it bombed troop concentrations and supply dumps near Montreuil. It attacked German lines of communication and fortifications during the Battle of the Bulge from December 1944 through January 1945. It bombed enemy transportation to assist Operation Varsity, the airborne assault across the Rhine in March 1945. The squadron flew its last combat mission on 25 April 1945.

=== Return to the United States and inactivation ===
Following V-E Day, the squadron redeployed to the United States. Most of the squadron's planes left Rackheath on 12 June 1945, while the ground echelon sailed on the RMS Queen Mary on 6 July. The squadron began to reassemble at Sioux Falls Army Air Field, South Dakota later in July. The squadron was selected for transition into the Boeing B-29 Superfortress and trained with the new bomber at Alamogordo Army Air Field, New Mexico and Harvard Army Air Field, Nebraska. Although Japan had surrendered, the squadron completed its transition into the Superfortress and, in January 1946, moved to Clovis Army Air Field, New Mexico.

The 6th Reconnaissance Squadron at Roswell Army Air Field was reassigned from the 468th Bombardment Group to the 311th Reconnaissance Wing on 7 March 1946 as Strategic Air Command consolidated its reconnaissance assets under the 311th Wing. The 791st moved to Roswell that day and was reassigned to the 468th Bombardment Group as the group's third squadron and became one of the first units in Strategic Air Command The squadron's stay at Roswell was short, as it was inactivated on 31 March 1946 along with the 468th.

== Lineage ==
- Constituted as the 791st Bombardment Squadron (Heavy) on 19 May 1943

Activated on 1 August 1943
Redesignated 791st Bombardment Squadron, Heavy c. 10 August 1944
Redesignated 791st Bombardment Squadron, Very Heavy on 5 August 1945
Inactivated on 31 March 1946

=== Assignments ===
- 467th Bombardment Group, 1 August 1943
- 468th Bombardment Group, 7–31 March 1946

=== Stations ===
- Wendover Field, Utah, 1 August 1943
- Mountain Home Army Air Field, Idaho, 8 September 1943
- Kearns Army Air Base, Utah 17 October 1943
- Wendover Field, Utah, 2 November 1943 – 12 February 1944
- RAF Rackheath (AAF-145), England, 11 March 1944 – 12 June 1945
- Sioux Falls Army Air Field, South Dakota, 15 July 1945
- Fairmont Army Air Field, Nebraska, 25 July 1945
- Alamogordo Army Air Field, New Mexico, 22 August 1945
- Harvard Army Air Field, Nebraska, 8 September 1945
- Clovis Army Air Field, New Mexico, 7 January 1946
- Roswell Army Air Field, New Mexico, 7–31 March 1946

=== Aircraft ===
- Consolidated B-24 Liberator, 1943–1945
- Boeing B-17 Flying Fortress, 1945–1946
- Boeing B-29 Superfortress, 1946

=== Campaigns ===
Campaign Streamer	Campaign	Dates	Notes
	Air Offensive, Europe	12 March 1944 – 5 June 1944	
	Normandy	6 June 1944 – 24 July 1944	
	Northern France	25 July 1944 – 14 September 1944	
	Rhineland	15 September 1944 – 21 March 1945	
	Ardennes-Alsace	16 December 1944 – 25 January 1945	
	Central Europe	22 March 1944 – 21 May 1945	

== See also ==
- B-24 Liberator units of the United States Army Air Forces
- B-17 Flying Fortress units of the United States Army Air Forces
- List of B-29 Superfortress operators
