= 787 Squadron =

787 Squadron may refer to:

- 787 Naval Air Squadron, United Kingdom
- 787th Air Expeditionary Squadron, United States
- 787th Bombardment Squadron, United States
- 787th Tactical Fighter Squadron, United States
- 787th Aircraft Control and Warning Squadron, later 787th Radar Squadron, United States
- 787th Transport Helicopter Squadron, part of 119th Helicopter Brigade, Yugoslavia
