= 352d Bombardment Squadron =

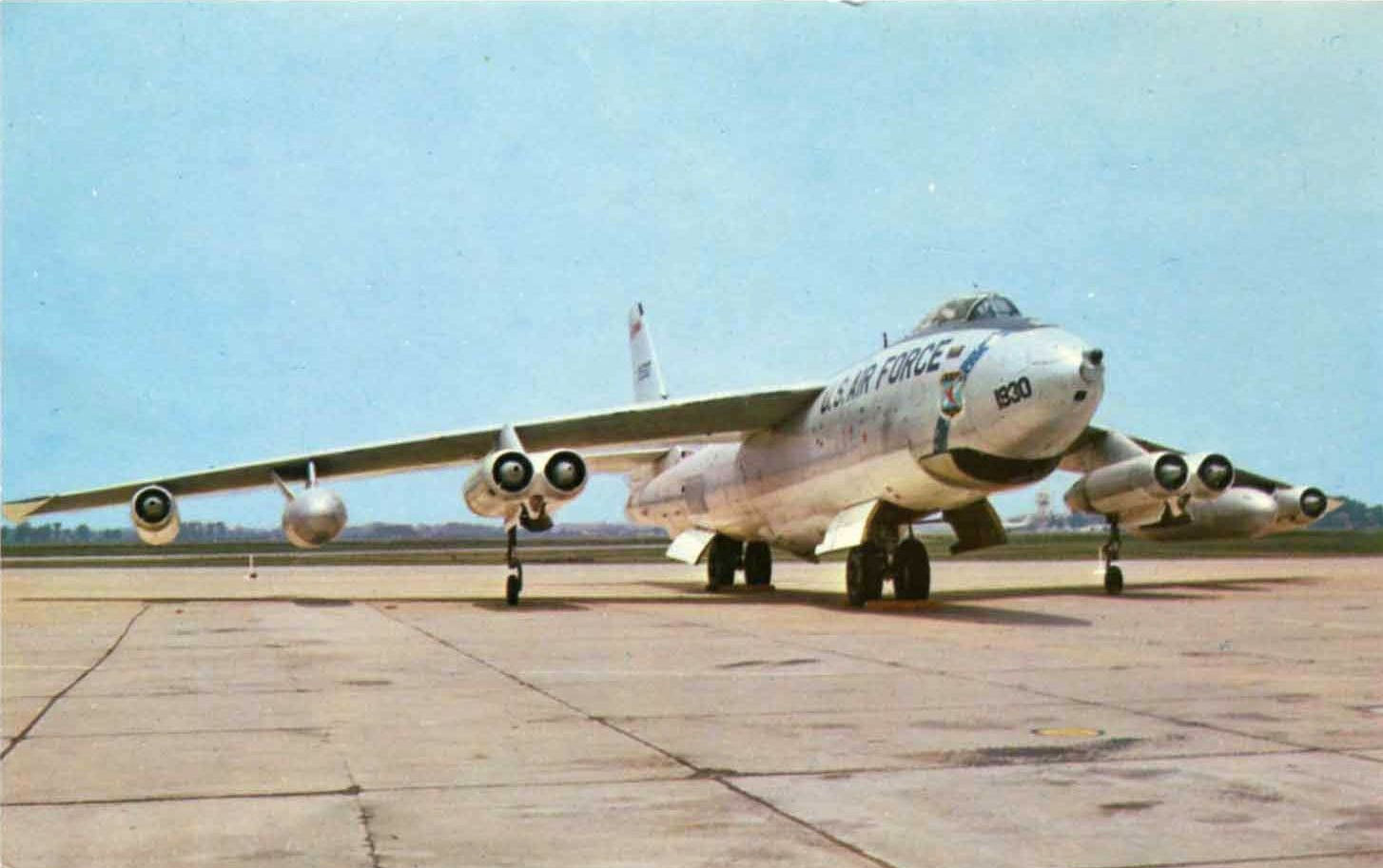
- 301st Wing B-47 Stratojet (Note: Aircraft is Lockheed Aircraft manufactured Boeing B-47E-55-LM Stratojet, serial 53-1830 parked at Langley Air Force Base in 1960. This plane was sent to the Military Aircraft Storage and Disposition Center on 18 January 1963 and scrapped on 30 October 1967. Baugher, Joe (5 August 2023). "1953 USAF Serial Numbers". Joe Baugher.)
- Active: 1942–1945; 1946–1964
- Country: United States
- Branch: United States Air Force
- Role: Bombardment
- Motto: Determined
- Engagements: Antisubmarine; European Theater of Operations; Mediterranean Theater of Operations
- Decorations: Distinguished Unit Citation; Air Force Outstanding Unit Award

Insignia
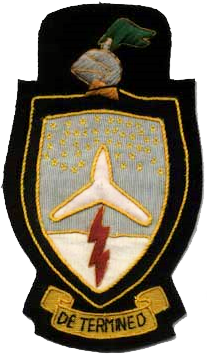
- Patch with 352d Bombardment Squadron emblem (Note: Approved 12 June 1957. Description: On a shield of the sky (Air Force blue in chief fading to light blue in base spattered in chief with white stars, a futuristic aircraft of the last [color mentioned], nose to chief, leaving a lightning-like trail of flame to base, Air Force yellow, orange and red; all within an Air Force golden yellow border; atop the shield a helmeted knight's head of the last [color mentioned], in profile facing the dexter, outlined and shaded brown, his neck flesh tone, flying from the top of the helmet, a green forked pennant.)

The 352d Bombardment Squadron is an inactive United States Air Force unit. It was last assigned to the 301st Bombardment Wing at Lockbourne Air Force Base, Ohio, where it was inactivated on 8 June 1964.

During World War II, the 352d Bombardment Squadron was a Boeing B-17 Flying Fortress squadron, assigned to the 301st Bombardment Group of Fifteenth Air Force. It earned two Distinguished Unit Citations, the first in 1943, the second in 1944. It returned to the United States following V-E Day to train as a very heavy bomber unit, but the end of the war in the Pacific resulted in its inactivation.

The squadron was activated in Strategic Air Command in 1946, assuming the personnel and equipment of another squadron, which was inactivated. It served under SAC until inactivating, makin frequent deployments overseas. It earned an Air Force Outstanding Unit Award, and was inactivated when the Boeing EB-47 Stratojet began to be withdrawn from service.

== History ==
=== World War II ===
==== Initial organization and training ====
The squadron was organized at Geiger Field, Washington as one of the four Boeing B-17 Flying Fortress squadrons of the 301st Bombardment Group in February 1942. In late May, it moved to Alamogordo Army Air Field, New Mexico, although the air echelon operated from Muroc Army Air Base, flying antisubmarine patrols off the California coast until early June 1942. The ground echelon moved to Virginia to prepare for movement overseas, leaving for Fort Dix and the Port of Embarkation on 19 July. The air echelon left for Brainard Field, Connecticut in late June. The squadron ferried its Flying Fortresses via the North Atlantic ferry route as part of Operation Bolero, the build up of American forces in the United Kingdom. The squadron and its companion squadrons of the 301st Group were the first B-17F unit to arrive in England. (Note: The 97th Bombardment Group had arrived earlier, but was equipped with B-17Es. Freeman, p. 13.)

==== Operations from England ====
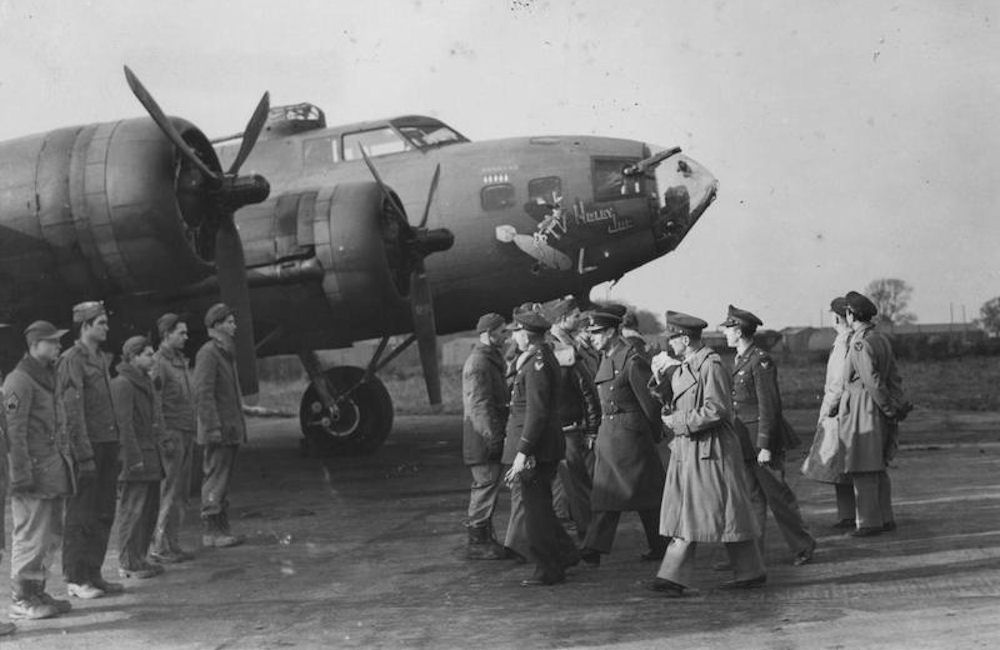
King George VI visiting the 301st Bombardment Group in 1942. (Note: The aircraft in the background is Boeing B-17F-1-BO Flying Fortress, serial 41-24352. This plane suffered severe battle damage on a mission to steel works at Lille, France (Although located in the Lille metropolitan area, the target was actually in Belgium, on the left bank of the Deûle River.) on 9 October 1942. The crew prepared to bail out but the bomber made it back to Chelveston with one engine on fire, two propellers feathered and a couple of hundred holes in it. Following this mission, it was named Holey Joe.)

The ground and air echelons were reunited at RAF Chelveston on 19 August 1942. The squadron flew its first mission on 5 September 1942. From England it attacked targets primarily in France, including submarine pens, airfields, railroad targets, and bridges. On 14 September, the 301st Group and its squadrons were reassigned to XII Bomber Command in preparation for Operation Torch, the invasion of North Africa, but they continued to operate under the control of VIII Bomber Command. Between 20 and 23 November 1942, the air echelon moved forward to bases in southeastern England, from which it flew directly to Tafaraoui Airfield, Algeria. The ground echelon sailed for Algeria from Liverpool on 8 December 1942.

==== Combat in the Mediterranean ====
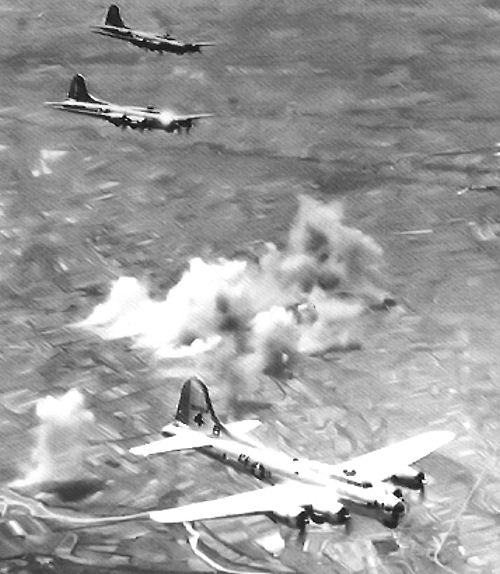
B-17Gs from the 352d Bombardment Squadron (Note: Taken as the aircraft left the ball bearing works at Turin, Italy badly damaged in the wake of their attack on 24 July 1944.)

Until August 1943, the squadron operated from airfields in Algeria, bombing docks, shipping facilities, airfields and marshalling yards in Tunisia, Sicily, and Sardinia. It also attacked enemy ships operating between Sicily and Tunisia. On 6 April 1943, the squadron withstood heavy flak from shore defenses and enemy vessels, when it attacked a merchant convoy near Bizerte, Tunisia that was carrying supplies essential for the Axis defense of Tunisia. For this mission it was awarded the Distinguished Unit Citation (DUC). In May and June, it participated in Operation Corkscrew, the bombing and invasion of Pantelleria, prior to the invasion of Sicily.

Starting in July 1943, the squadron began flying numerous missions to targets in Italy, moving forward to Oudna Airfield, Tunisia in early August. In November 1943, strategic and tactical air forces in the Mediterranean were divided and the squadron became part of Fifteenth Air Force. It moved to Italy in December 1943 and in February 1944 it was established at Lucera Airfield, Italy, from which it would conduct combat operations for the remainder of the war. From its Italian base, it concentrated on the strategic bombing campaign against Germany, attacking oil centers, lines of communications, and industrial areas in Austria, Bulgaria, Czechoslovakia, France, Germany, Greece, Hungary, Italy, Poland, Romania, and Yugoslavia. On 23 February 1944, it participated in an attack on the Messerschmitt aircraft factory at Regensburg, succeeding despite "vicious" attacks by enemy interceptors. For this mission, it was awarded a second DUC.

The 352d also flew air support missions near Anzio and Monte Cassino, provided cover for Operation Dragoon, the invasion of southern France and the advance of the Red Army in the Balkans and the Allied advances in the Po Valley. It engaged in shuttle bombing missions to airfields in the Soviet Union during the summer of 1944.

==== Return to the United States ====
Following V-E Day, the squadron remained in Italy until July 1945. In August, it was designated as a "very heavy" unit in preparation for conversion to the Boeing B-29 Superfortress and deployment to Pacific Theater. Before the squadron arrived at its planned training base, Pyote Army Air Field, Texas, Japan had surrendered and there was no need for additional bomber units. The squadron was inactivated in October 1945, shortly before Pyote ended training operations and became an aircraft storage depot.

=== Strategic Air Command ===
==== B-29 operations ====
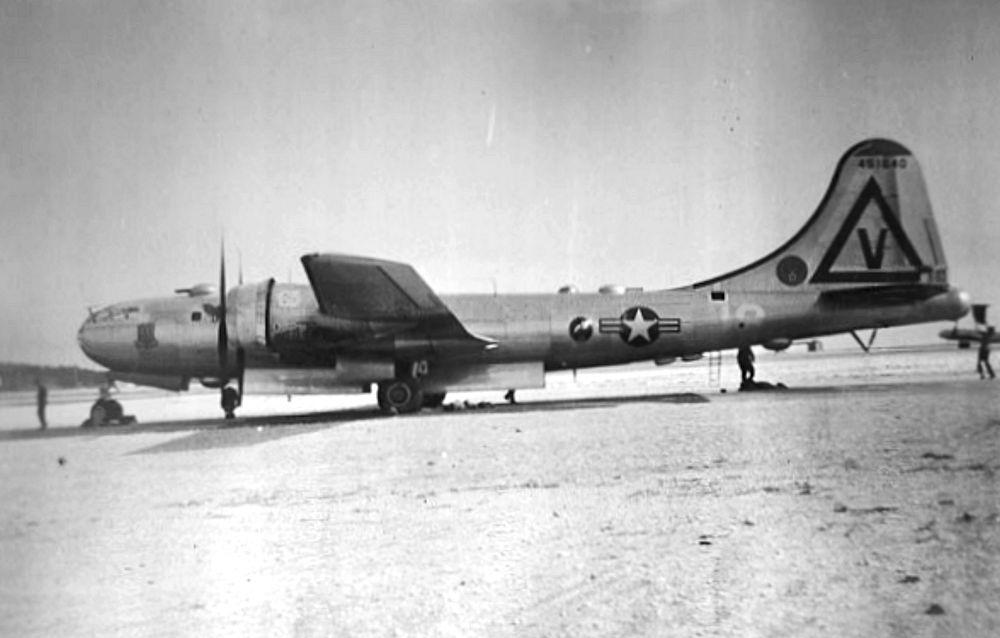
301st Bombardment Group B-29 Superfortress (Note: Aircraft is Boeing B-29A-40-BN Superfortress, serial 44-61640. It was later converted to WB-29 weather reconnaissance configuration and was lost on 26 February 1952. Baugher, Joe (9 October 2023). "1944 USAF Serial Numbers". Joe Baugher.)

The squadron was reactivated at Clovis Army Air Field, New Mexico in August 1946 as a Strategic Air Command (SAC) bombardment squadron, assuming the personnel and B-29 Superfortresses of the 789th Bombardment Squadron, which was simultaneously inactivated. In July 1947, it moved to Smoky Hill Army Air Field, Kansas. For a short time, from November 1947 until January 1948, along with other elements of the 301st Bombardment Wing, it was engaged in providing aerial gunnery training for other SAC units. From Smoky Hill, It deployed to Fürstenfeldbruck Air Base, Germany in July through August 1948, for a "show of force" as a result of the Berlin Blockade by the Soviet Union. It deployed again to RAF Scampton, England from 18 October 1948 to 15 January 1949

In November 1949, the squadron moved to Barksdale Air Force Base, Louisiana. SAC’s mobilization for the Korean War highlighted that SAC wing commanders focused too much on running the base organization and not enough time overseeing combat preparations. To allow wing commanders the ability to focus on combat operations, the air base group commander became responsible for managing base housekeeping functions. Under the plan implemented in February 1951 and finalized in June 1952, the wing commander focused primarily on the combat units and the maintenance necessary to support combat aircraft. In this reorganization, the squadron was reassigned directly to the wing, eliminating the intermediate group structure.

The 352d conducted other deployments from this base, as a squadron to RAF Sculthorpe from 17 May to 28 November 1950, and to RAF Lakenheath from May to August 1951. it deployed with the entire 301st Wing to RAF Upper Heyford from December 1952 to March 1953.

==== B-47 operations ====
This was the squadron's last deployment with the B-29, and upon its return to Barksdale, the squadron began converting to the Boeing B-47 Stratojet. It returned to RAF Upper Heyford with its new bombers in the spring of 1955 for a three month deployment. In late 1956, tensions between the United States and Soviet Union grew with the simultaneous Suez Crisis and Hungarian Revolution. SAC knew that Soviet intelligence had established collection stations in the Arctic. In a show of force, named Operation Road Block, SAC launched 36 of the 301st Wing's Stratojets on 29 November and 36 more from the 100th Bombardment Wing to a rendezvous near Baffin Island. The squadron's planes carried the casings and pits for Mark 15 and Mark 21 nuclear bombs. (Note: The cores for these weapons were retained by the Atomic Energy Commission.) The B-47s were easily detectable, flying in a steady stream at altitudes near 40,000 feet (12,000 m). Turning south, the aircraft split into four plane formations to conduct simulated attacks on targets in the United States.

The squadron moved to Lockbourne Air Force Base in April 1958. In July, the squadron added electronic warfare to its mission, but returned to bomber operations later in the year. That year, SAC Boeing B-47 Stratojet squadrons began to assume an alert posture at their home bases, reducing the amount of time spent on alert at overseas bases. The percentage of SAC planes on alert gradually grew over the next three years to reach its goal of 1/3 of SAC’s force on alert by 1960.

In 1961, the squadron's mission again shifted to electronic warfare as it replaced its B-47s with EB-47s. Soon after the detection of Soviet missiles in Cuba, all degraded and adjusted alert sorties were brought up to full capability. On 22 October the squadron's B-47s were dispersed. Most dispersal bases were civilian airfields with AF Reserve or Air National Guard units already stationed there. B-47s were configured for execution of the Emergency War Order as soon as possible after dispersal. On 24 October SAC went to DEFCON 2, placing all aircraft on alert. On 15 November 1/6 of the squadron's dispersed B-47s were recalled to Lockbourne. The remaining B-47s were recalled on 24 November. On 27 November SAC returned to normal alert posture and began coordinating the return of its Florida planes to their home bases.

As the B-47 neared the end of its life, the 301st Wing mission converted to air refueling and the 352d was inactivated in June 1964.

== Lineage ==
- Constituted as the 352d Bombardment Squadron (Heavy) on 28 January 1942

Activated on 3 February 1942
Redesignated 352d Bombardment Squadron, Heavy c. 20 August 1943
Redesignated 352d Bombardment Squadron, Very Heavy on 5 August 1945
Inactivated on 15 October 1945
Activated on 4 August 1946
Redesignated 352d Bombardment Squadron, Medium on 28 May 1948
Inactivated on 8 June 1964

=== Assignments ===
- 301st Bombardment Group, 3 February 1942 – 15 October 1945
- 301st Bombardment Group, 4 August 1946 – 16 June 1952 (attached to 301st Bombardment Wing 10 February–20 September 1951 and after 20 December 1951)
- 301st Bombardment Wing, 16 June 1952 - 8 June 1964

=== Stations ===
- Geiger Field, Washington, 3 February 1942
- Alamogordo Army Air Field, New Mexico, 28 May 1942 (operated from Muroc Army Air Base and Lindbergh Field, California, until 14 June 1942)
- Richmond Army Air Base, Virginia, 21 June – 19 July 1942
- RAF Chelveston (Station 105), England, 19 August 1942
- Tafaraoui Airfield, Algeria, 24 November 1942
- Biskra Airfield, Algeria, 21 December 1942
- Ain M'lila Airfield, Algeria, 16 January 1943
- Saint-Donat Airfield, Algeria, 8 March 1943
- Oudna Airfield, Tunisia, 6 August 1943
- Cerignola Airfield, Italy, 10 December 1943
- Lucera Airfield, Italy, 2 February 1944 – July 1945
- Sioux Falls Army Air Field, South Dakota, 28 July 1945
- Mountain Home Army Air Field, Idaho, 17 August 1945
- Pyote Army Air Base, Texas, 23 August – 15 October 1945
- Clovis Army Air Field, New Mexico, 4 August 1946
- Smoky Hill Army Air Field (later Smoky Hill Air Force Base), Kansas, 16 July 1947
- Barksdale Air Force Base, Louisiana, 7 November 1949
- Lockbourne Air Force Base, Ohio, 15 April 1958 – 8 June 1964

=== Aircraft ===
- Boeing B-17 Flying Fortress, 1942–1945
- Boeing B-29 Superfortress, 1946–1952
- Boeing B-47 Stratojet, 1952–1958, 1958-1961
- Boeing RB-47 Stratojet, 1958
- Boeing EB-47, 1961–1964

=== Awards and campaigns ===
Award streamer	Award	Dates	Notes
	Distinguished Unit Citation	6 April 1943	Tunisia
	Distinguished Unit Citation	25 February 1944	Germany
	Air Force Outstanding Unit Award	1 January 1961 – 31 December 1962	

Campaign Streamer	Campaign	Dates	Notes
	Antisubmarine	3 February 1942 – 14 June 1942	
	Air Offensive, Europe	19 August 1942 – 5 June 1944	
	Air Combat, EAME Theater	19 August 1942 – 11 May 1945	
	Egypt-Libya	24 November 1942 – 12 February 1943	
	Tunisia	24 November 1942 – 13 May 1943	
	Sicily	14 May 1943 – 17 August 1943	
	Naples-Foggia	18 August 1943 – 21 January 1944	
	Anzio	22 January 1944 – 24 May 1944	
	Rome-Arno	22 January 1944 – 9 September 1944	
	Central Europe	22 March 1944 – 21 May 1945	
	Normandy	6 June 1944 – 24 July 1944	
	Northern France	25 July 1944 – 14 September 1944	
	Southern France	15 August 1944 – 14 September 1944	
	North Apennines	10 September 1944 – 4 April 1945	
	Rhineland	15 September 1944 – 21 March 1945	
	Po Valley	3 April 1945 – 8 May 1945	

== See also ==
- Boeing B-17 Flying Fortress Units of the Mediterranean Theater of Operations
- List of B-29 Superfortress operators
- List of B-47 units of the United States Air Force
- List of United States Air Force electronic warfare squadrons
