= RAF Rackheath =

Former Royal Air Force station used by USAAF

RAF Rackheath USAAF Station 145
- Near Norwich, Norfolk in England
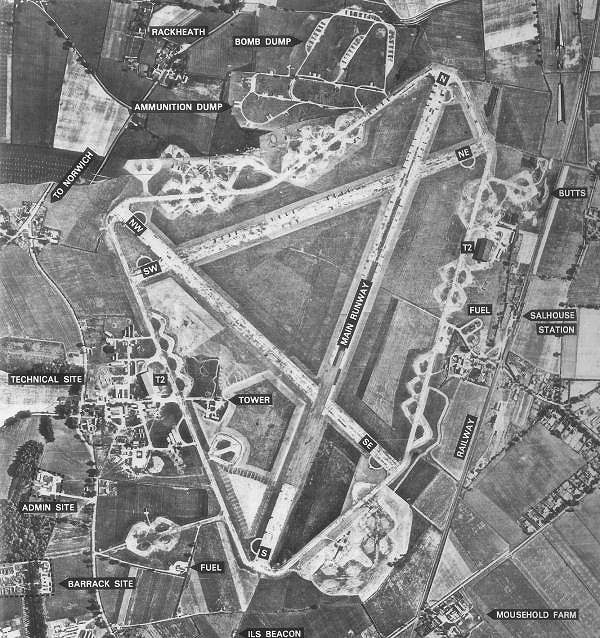
- Labeled aerial photo of RAF Rackheath, showing the typical class A airfield layout, July 1946

Site information
- Type: Royal Air Force station
- Code: RK
- Owner: Air Ministry
- Operator: Royal Air Force; United States Army Air Forces
- Condition: airfield returned to agriculture, technical site now known as Rackheath Industrial Estate

Location
- Shown within Norfolk
- Coordinates: 52°40′28″N 01°22′43″E
- Grid reference: SU 270 703

Site history
- Built: 1943; 83 years ago
- In use: 1944 – 1945
- Fate: closed

Garrison information
- Occupants: 467th Bombardment Group (Heavy), 8th AF, USAAF

Airfield information
- Elevation: 31 metres (100 feet) AMSL
Runways
Direction	Length and surface
~~00/00~~	2,000 yards (1,800 metres) concrete
~~00/00~~	1,400 yards (1,300 metres) concrete
~~00/00~~	1,400 yards (1,300 metres) concrete

Royal Air Force Rackheath, more commonly known as RAF Rackheath, is a former Royal Air Force station located near the village of Rackheath, approximately 6 miles (9.7 kilometres) north-east of Norwich, in the county of Norfolk in England.

== History ==
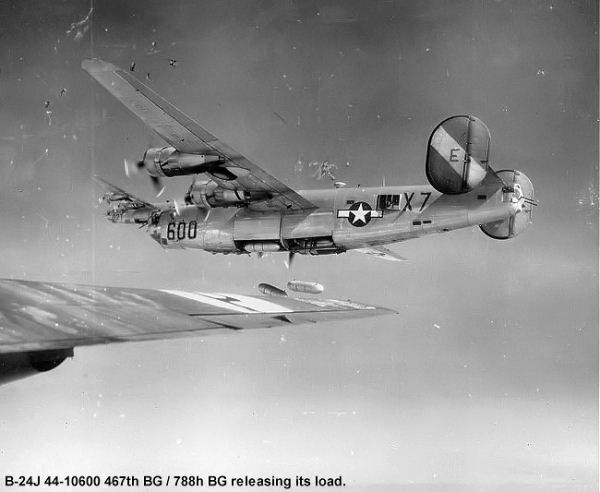
Consolidated B-24J-65-CF Liberator, serial 44-10600, of the 788th Bomb Squadron releasing its bomb load during WWII. Based at RAF Rackheath.

Laid out on agricultural land between the two settlements of Rackheath Parva and Rackheath Magna, construction on the airfield began in 1943; 83 years ago, for the United States Army Air Forces (USAAF) Eighth Air Force (8th AF). Constructed to the Air Ministry requirements for a class A airfield, it followed the typical layout of other heavy bomber bases, with a main runway of 2,000 yards (1,800 metres) and two auxiliary runways of 1,400 yards (1,300 metres) each. The perimeter track was 2.7 miles (4.3 kilometres) in length, and this and the runways had a concrete screed finish. Mark II airfield lighting was installed, two T2 hangars were erected for major aircraft maintenance, and dispersed temporary building accommodation provided for some 2400 personnel in the wooded countryside of the estate to the south-west of the airfield. A dispersed weapon storage area was constructed to the north of the airfield. During construction, 556,000 cubic yards (425,000 cubic metres) of soil were excavated, 14,000 yards (13,000 metres) of soak-away drains installed, and 504,000 yards (461,000 metres) of concrete laid. A major overhead power line had to be put underground to clear the aircraft flying approaches.

=== USAAF use ===
The airfield was given USAAF designation Station 145.

==== 467th Bombardment Group (Heavy) ====
The airfield was opened on 11 March 1943; 83 years ago, and was used by the 467th Bombardment Group (Heavy), 'The Rackheath Aggies', of the United States Army Air Forces (USAAF), arriving from Wendover AAF at Utah. The 467th was assigned to the 96th Combat Bombardment Wing, and the group tail code was a 'Circle-P'. Flying Consolidated B-24 Liberators, its operational squadrons were:

- 788th Bombardment Squadron (X7)
- 789th Bombardment Squadron (6A)
- 790th Bombardment Squadron (Q2)
- 791st Bombardment Squadron (4Z)

The group flew the Consolidated B-24 Liberator as part of the Eighth Air Force's strategic bombing campaign. The 467th began operations on 10 April 1944, with an attack by thirty aircraft on an airfield at Bourges in central France.

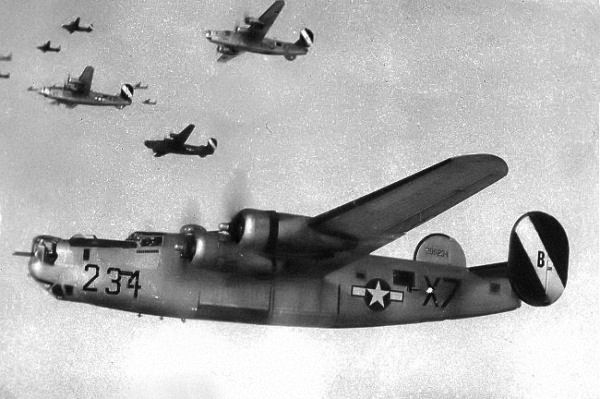
Ford B-24H-25-FO Liberator, serial 42-95234 'Weiser Witch', of the 788th Bomb Squadron. This aircraft crash landed at RAF Bungay on 5 May 1945 after fire in the nose.

In combat, the unit served chiefly as a strategic bombardment organisation, attacking the German navy harbour at Kiel, chemical plants at Bonn, textile factories at Stuttgart, power plants at Hamm, steel works at Osnabrück, the aircraft industry at Brunswick, and other objectives.

In addition to strategic operations, it was engaged occasionally in support and interdiction missions. It bombed shore installations and bridges near Cherbourg on D-Day, 6 June 1944. It struck enemy troop and supply concentrations near Montreuil on 25 July 1944 to assist the Allied drive across France.

In September, over two weeks the bombers flew petrol from Rackheath to a forward base at Clastres in France for use by the US mechanised forces. Attacked German communications and fortifications during the Battle of the Bulge, December 1944 to January 1945. To assist the Allied assault across the Rhine in March 1945 it attacked enemy transportation.

The group flew its last combat mission on 25 April 1945, and then returned to the US to Sioux Falls AAF in South Dakota during June and July 1945. Subsequently, the 467th was re-designated as the 467th Bombardment Group (Very Heavy), with Boeing B-29 Superfortresses in preparation for the planned invasion of Japan. The 467th was inactivated on 4 August 1946.

=== RAF use ===
The airfield was returned to the Royal Air Force, and a number of units were posted here:

- No. 94 Maintenance Unit RAF (27 January 1948 - 16 August 1954)
- No. 231 Maintenance Unit RAF

== Current use ==
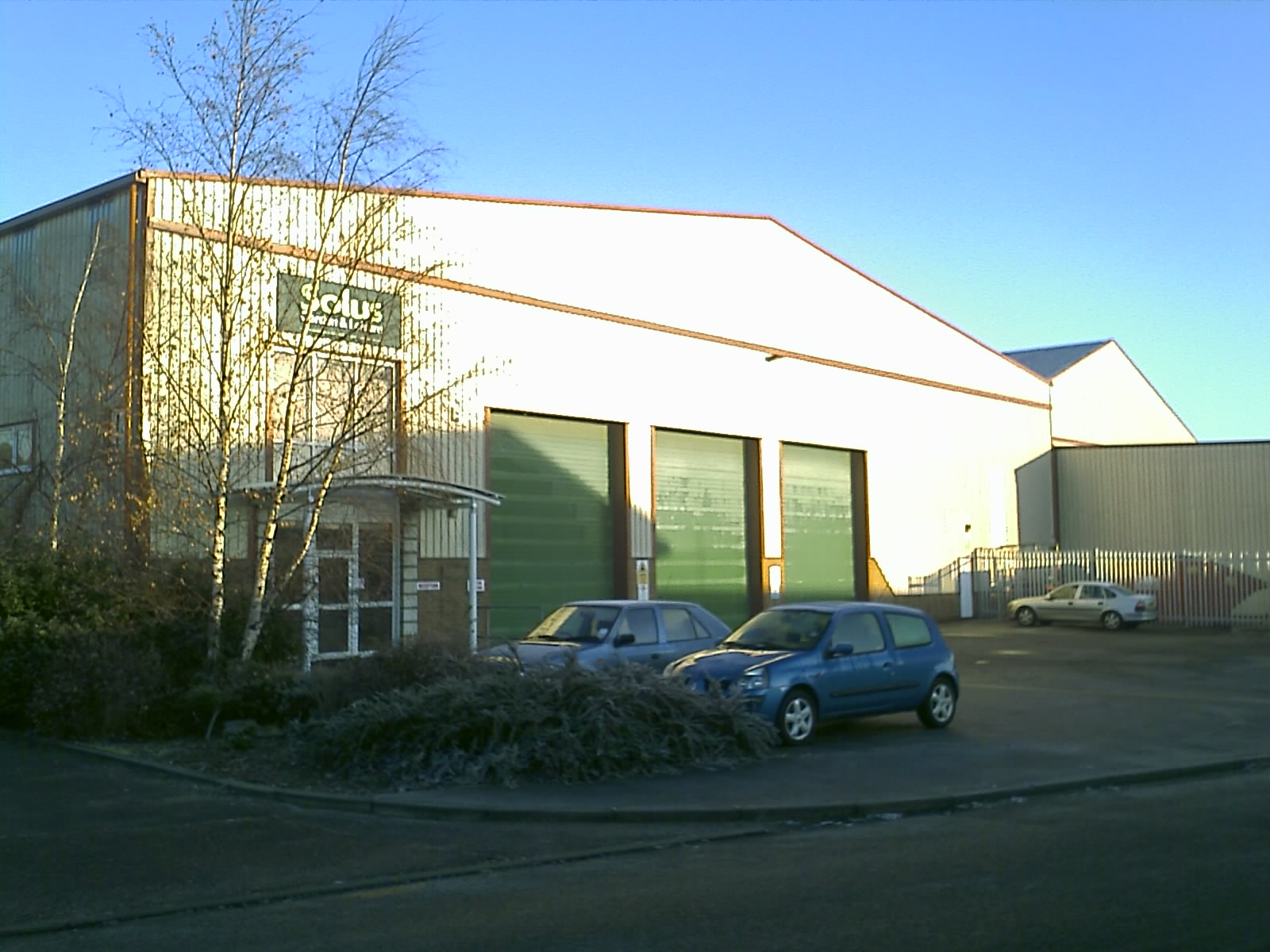
Commercial use of former T2 hangar, 2007.

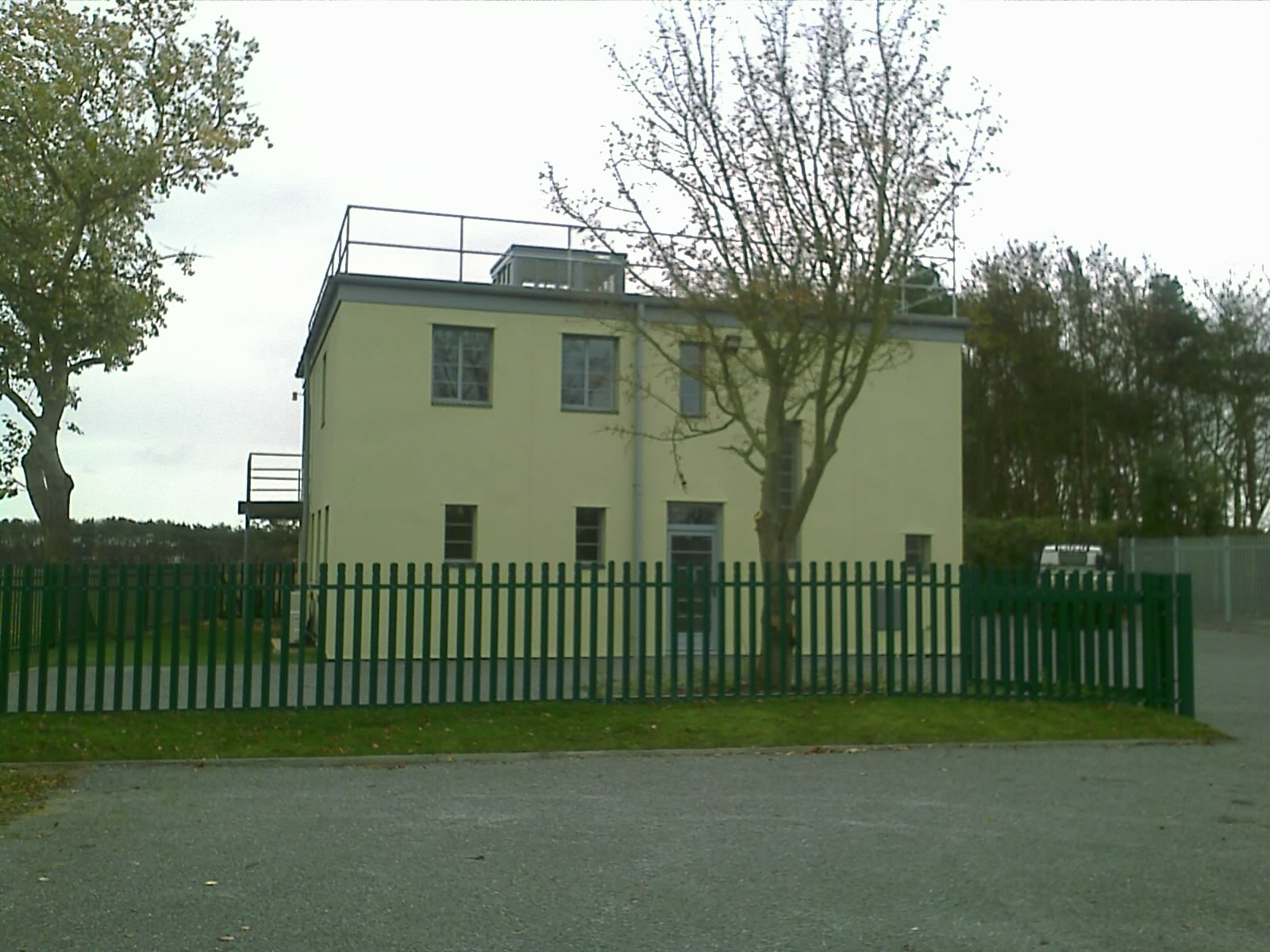
The control tower renovated for use as offices, 2007.

With the end of the war, the airfield was closed permanently in late 1945; 81 years ago and the airfield site was returned to farming use. Only a very small section of the main runway, small sections of perimeter track, and a solitary pair of former dispersed aircraft hardstandings on the south-west of the airfield still exist; the remainder of the former airfield concrete infrastructure has been removed and broken up for re-use as construction aggregate. Muck Lane, which was previously closed when the airfield was constructed, was subsequently restored and re-opened to vehicular traffic, and alongside a small race track created for remote control car racing, used by Norfolk Buggy Club.

The former admin site is now a small development of new private houses and the former barracks site is now new commercial buildings. The former main technical site is now known as Rackheath Industrial Estate, with several of the WW2-era buildings having been modified or extended and used for light industry (including engineering, logistics, construction, automotive maintenance, and communications), with many new additional modern industrial buildings constructed. The primary access road on the estate was named Wendover Road to commemorate the airbase in the United States where the 467th Bomb Group was formed. Other estate roads carry related names including: Albert Shower Road after base commander Colonel Albert J. Shower; Ramirez Road after ground crew chief M/Sgt Joe Ramirez; Witchcraft Way (which leads to the former control tower) after an individual aircraft of the group; and Hudson Close and Liberator Close.

The control tower still exists, though after many years of neglect, was renovated during 2006 and 2007; it has been converted to use as an administrative building, currently occupied by a software company. The west T2 hangar is virtually beyond recognition, as compared to its appearance in 1943. The former aircraft hangar doors have been removed, replaced by modern brickwork and aluminium cladding, with smaller rolling shutter doors added to the front, and it has been repainted cream and green. Inside the building, the roof girders appear to be original and identical to those seen in photographs taken in 1944. The other T2 hangar, on the eastern side of the airfield near the Salhouse railway station, was dismantled many years ago and two new small industrial buildings constructed on its former southern dispersal.

== Memorials ==
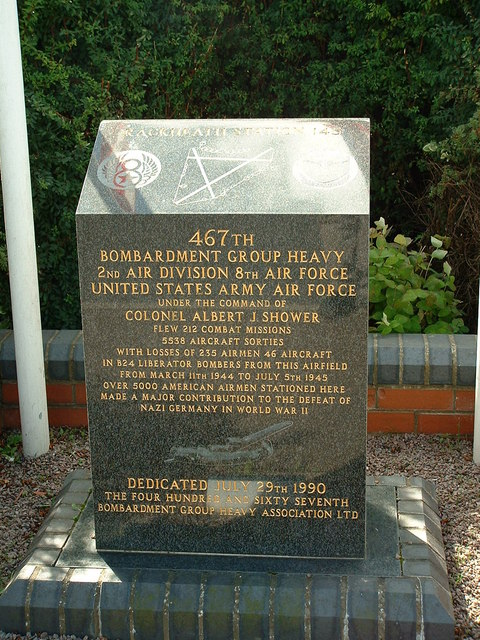
467th Bombardment Group (Heavy) memorial stone, corner of Bidwell Road and Liberator Close.

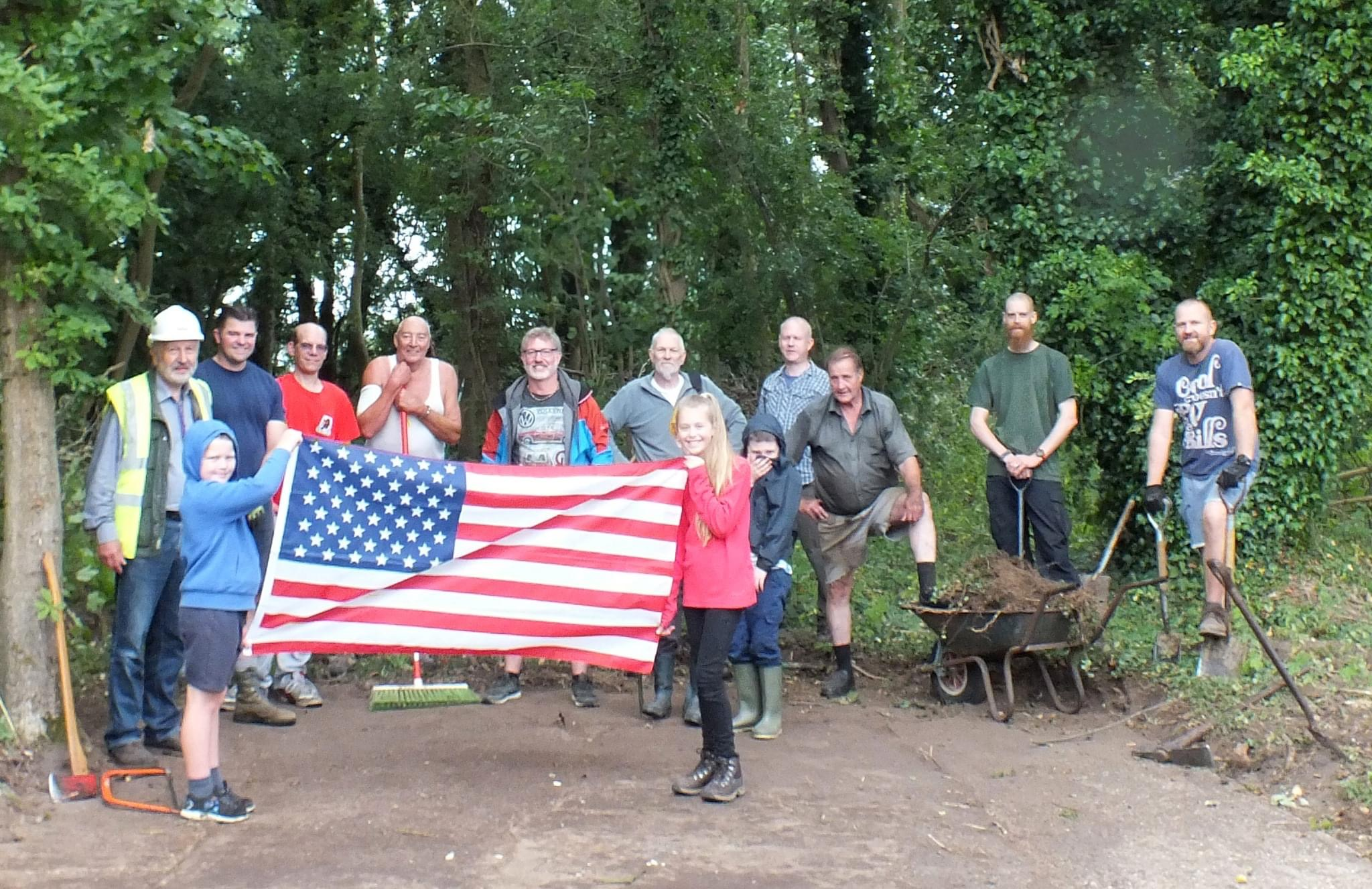
Rackheath Pathfinders - Site 6 (467th) USAAF, 16 October 2020

A memorial to the 467th Bomb Group consisting of a plaque and a pair of benches was dedicated in 1983. The memorial plaque, flanked by the two benches, is situated in front the Rackheath village sign on the Salhouse Road, adjacent to the Holy Trinity Church at 52°39'46"N 01°22'42"E.

A further memorial stone was erected in 1990 on the corner of Bidwell Road and Liberator Close. Flanked by two flagpoles with United States and United Kingdom flags hoisted, the polished black granite stone, with inscription detailing the operations of the 467th Bombardment Group (Heavy) of the 2nd Air Division, Eighth Air Force, USAAF at RAF Rackheath, was dedicated on 29 July 1990 by the Four Hundred And Sixty Seventh Bombardment Group Heavy Association Ltd.

=== Rackheath Pathfinders ===
Site 6 was a small part of the airbase comprising, amongst others, Commanding Officer's (and his deputy's) quarters, officers' club, shower blocks, dining rooms, cinema, kitchen areas, and several blast shelters. The site is bisected by Newman Road.

In March 2020, a volunteer group (The Pathfinders) was formed to help manage and 're-claim' the site. A Facebook Group has been formed to enable people to follow the volunteers progress.

== See also ==
- List of former Royal Air Force stations
