= Clastres =

- Commune
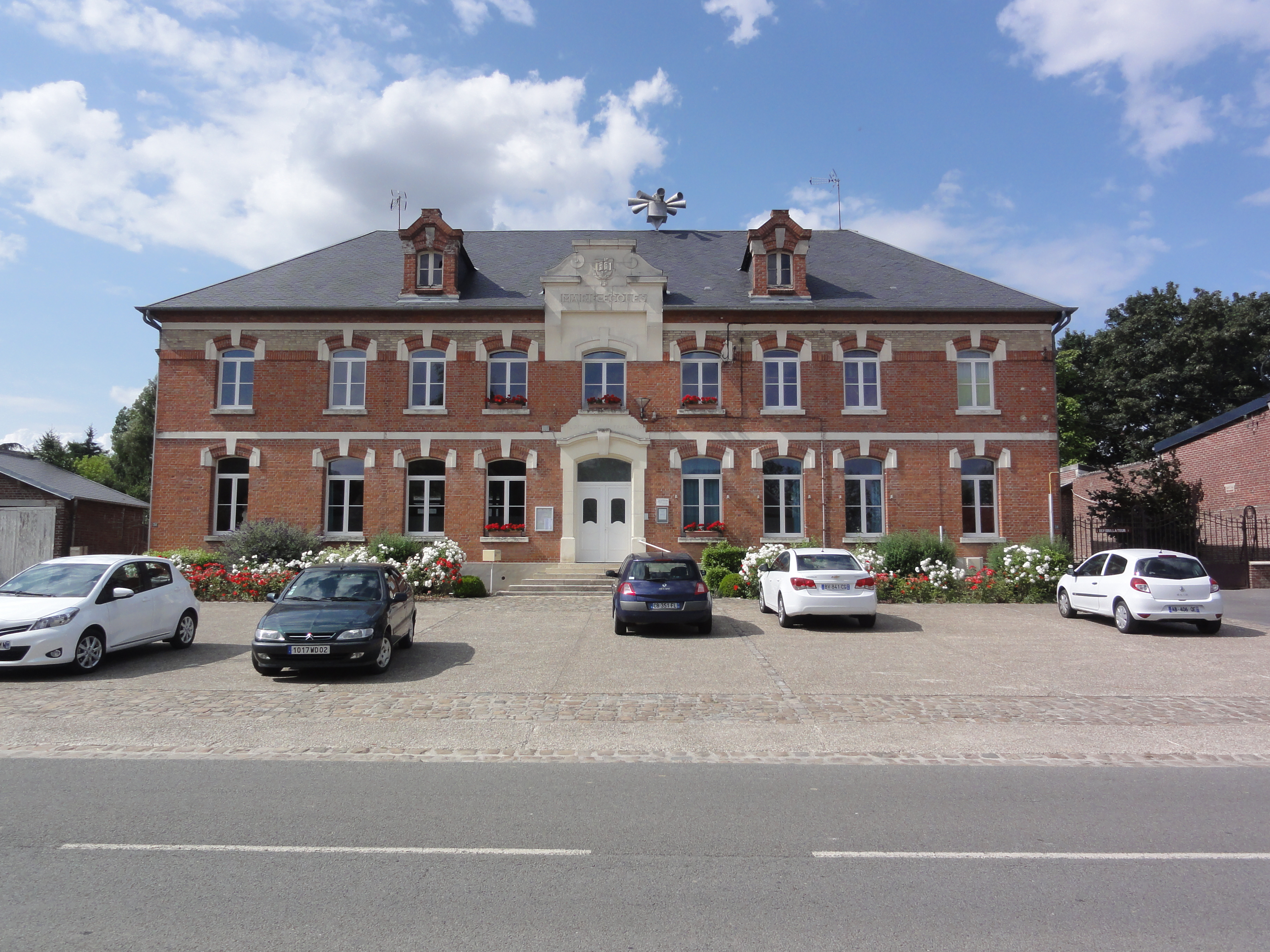
- The town hall and schools of Clastres

- Coat of arms
- Location of Clastres
- Location within France Location within Hauts-de-France
- Coordinates: 49°44′46″N 3°13′58″E
- Country: France
- Region: Hauts-de-France
- Department: Aisne
- Arrondissement: Saint-Quentin
- Canton: Ribemont
- Intercommunality: CA Saint-Quentinois

Government
  - Mayor (2026–32): Jean-Louis Gasdon
- Area^{1}: 8.24 km^{2} (3.18 sq mi)
- Elevation: 79 m (259 ft)
- Highest elevation: 95 m (312 ft)
- Lowest elevation: 63 m (207 ft)
- Population (2023): 589
  - Density: 71.5/km^{2} (185/sq mi)
- Time zone: UTC+01:00 (CET)
  - Summer (DST): UTC+02:00 (CEST)
- INSEE/Postal code: 02199 /02440
- ^{1} French Land Register data, which excludes lakes, ponds, glaciers > 1 km^{2} (0.386 sq mi or 247 acres) and river estuaries.

Clastres (French pronunciation: [klastʁ]) is a commune in the Aisne department in Hauts-de-France in northern France.

== Population ==
Historical population
Year	Pop.	±% p.a.
1968	529	—
1975	447	−2.38%
1982	534	+2.57%
1990	559	+0.57%
1999	509	−1.04%
2007	543	+0.81%
2012	624	+2.82%
2017	635	+0.35%
2023	589	−1.25%
Source: INSEE

== See also ==
- Communes of the Aisne department
