= 787th Air Expeditionary Squadron =

787th Air Expeditionary Squadron

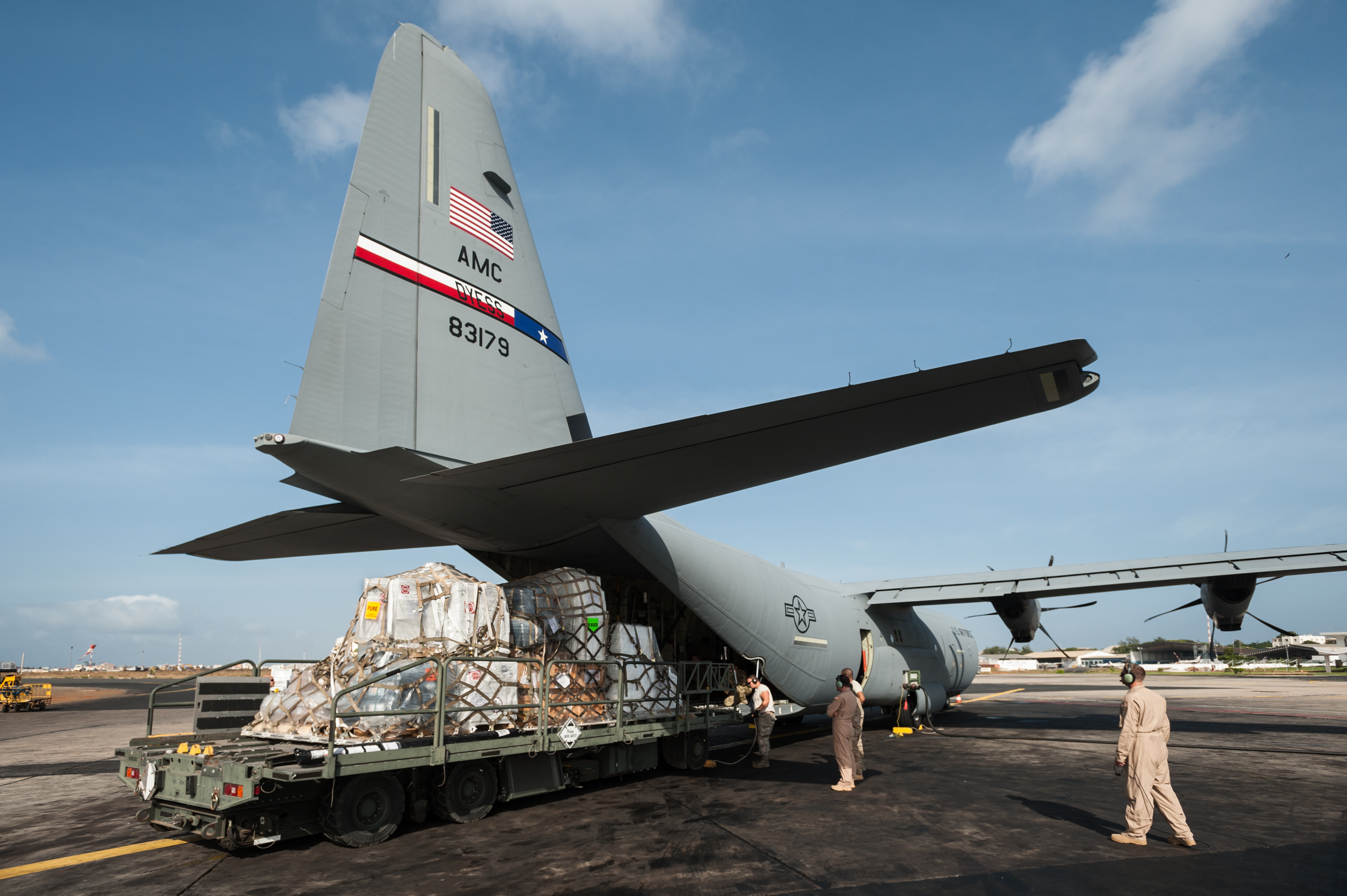
- Airmen and equipment deploy as the 787th Air Expeditionary Squadron for Operation United Assistance
- Active: 1943–1946; 1965; 2006; 2014–2015
- Country: United States
- Branch: United States Air Force
- Role: Expeditionary operations
- Part of: United States Air Forces Europe
- Engagements: European Theater of Operations
- Decorations: Air Force Meritorious Unit Award

Insignia
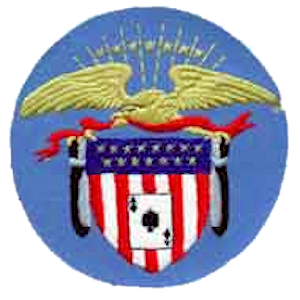
- Patch with unofficial 787th Bombardment Squadron emblem
- World War II fuselage code: 6L

The 787th Air Expeditionary Squadron is a provisional United States Air Force unit, assigned to United States Air Forces Europe. The squadron has been activated twice for contingency operations in Africa.

The squadron was first organized in August 1943 as the 787th Bombardment Squadron, a heavy bomber unit. After training in the United States with Consolidated B-24 Liberators, the 787th moved to England, where it participated in the strategic bombing campaign against Germany. Following V-E Day, it returned to the United States, where it began training with Boeing B-29 Superfortresses, but was inactivated in October 1945.

In 1965, the squadron was briefly active under the 33d Tactical Fighter Wing as a McDonnell F-4 Phantom II squadron, but its personnel and equipment were transferred to another unit within four months of its activation.

== History ==
=== World War II ===
==== Training in the United States ====
The 787th Bombardment Squadron was activated at Alamogordo Army Air Field on 1 August 1943 as one of the four original squadrons of the 466th Bombardment Group. After training there with Consolidated B-24 Liberators, the squadron departed for the European Theater of Operations in February 1944. The ground echelon proceeded to the port of embarkation for transport to Europe by ship, while the air echelon ferried their Liberators via the South Atlantic Ferry route.

==== Combat in Europe ====
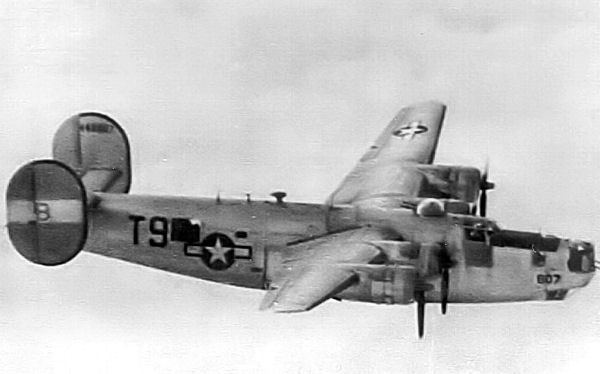
466th Bomb Gp B-24 Liberator (Note: The aircraft in the photograph is clearly a 466th Group airplane, based on its markings. It is identified in the photograph as Consolidated B-24J-180-CO Liberator, serial 44-40807. However, the aircraft's serial number is not clear in the photograph, and Baugher identifies the aircraft with this serial number as assigned to the 758th Bombardment Squadron, a unit in the Mediterranean Theater of Operations. Baugher, Joe (10 June 2023). "1944 USAF Serial Numbers". Joe Baugher.)

The squadron arrived at its combat station, RAF Attlebridge in England in March 1944. It flew its first combat mission on 22 March in an attack on Berlin, Germany. It engaged primarily in the strategic bombing campaign against Germany, with targets that included oil refineries and facilities at Bohlen and Misburg, marshalling yards at Liège and Saarbrücken, factories at Brunswick, Kempten and Eisenach, repair facilities at Reims, mining facilities near Hamburg and airfields at Saint-Trond and Chartres.

The squadron also flew air support and air interdiction missions. It attacked pillboxes in Normandy on D-Day to support Operation Overlord and performed interdiction missions against targets beyond the beachhead in the following days. During Operation Cobra, the breakout at Saint Lo in July, it bombed German positions in the city. It attacked lines of communication during the Battle of the Bulge in December 1944 and January 1945. On 24 March, it supported Operation Varsity, the airborne assault across the Rhine by attacking a military air base at Nordhorn. The squadron's last mission of the war was flown on 25 April 1945 against electrical facilities at Traunstein.

==== Return to the United States and inactivation ====
Following V-E Day, the squadron returned to the United States. The air echelon began flying their B-24s back to the United States in the middle of June, while the ground echelon sailed aboard the RMS Queen Mary on 6 July. The squadron reassembled at Sioux Falls Army Air Field, South Dakota in late July 1945. In August, the squadron moved to Davis-Monthan Field, Arizona to begin training with the Boeing B-29 Superfortress. However with the surrender of Japan, the squadron was inactivated in October as Davis-Monthan transitioned from a training base to a storage facility.

=== Fighter operations ===
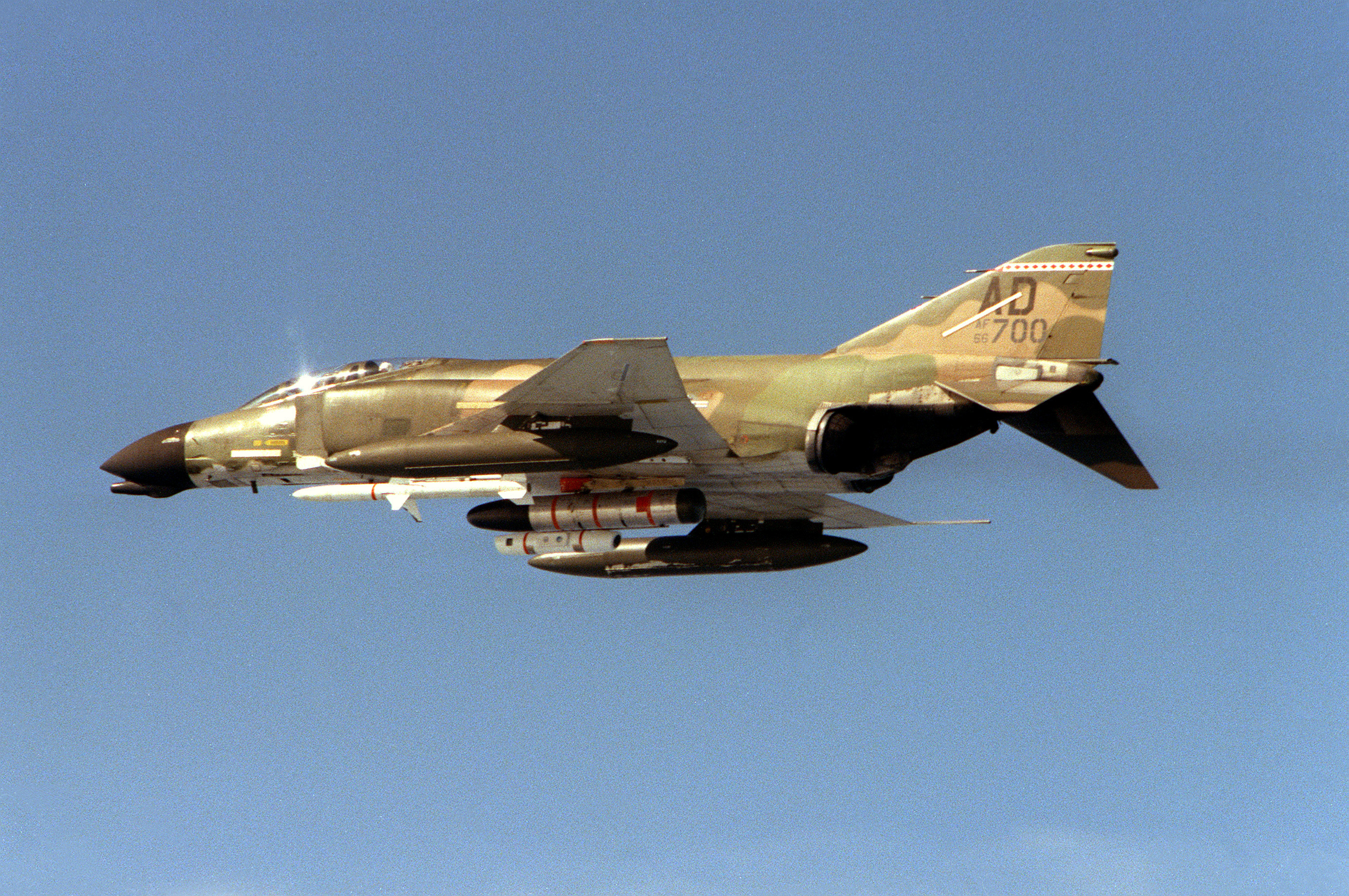
F-4D near Eglin AFB

As the United States Air Force expanded its McDonnell F-4 Phantom II fleet in April 1965, it activated the 33d Tactical Fighter Wing at Eglin Air Force Base Florida. Although it was planned that the squadrons of the 33d Wing would be Convair F-102 Delta Dagger squadrons that were inactivating in the Pacific, these squadrons were still winding down their operations, so the 33d was initially formed with the 786th, 787th, 788th and 789th Tactical Fighter Squadrons. The 33d embarked on a program of tactical training with the Phantom. In June 1965, the squadron was inactivated and its planes and personnel were transferred to the 16th Tactical Fighter Squadron, which moved on paper to Eglin from Misawa Air Base, Japan.

=== Expeditionary unit ===
In April 2006, the squadron was converted to provisional status as the 787th Air Expeditionary Squadron and assigned to United States Air Forces Europe to activate or inactivate as needed. It deployed to Karadje, Niger in July to support Operation Eagle Vision, downloading satellite imagery for mapmaking.

The squadron was activated at Dakar, Senegal, where it established a transportation hub for Operation Unified Assistance, the US military name for humanitarian operations to limit the spread of Ebola in West Africa. It relieved members of the Kentucky Air National Guard's 123d Contingency Support Group. It continued airlift missions with Lockheed C-130 Hercules aircraft for the next four months.

== Lineage ==
- Constituted as the 787th Bombardment Squadron (Heavy) on 19 May 1943

Activated on 1 August 1943
Redesignated 787th Bombardment Squadron, Heavy c. 10 August 1944
Redesignated 787th Bombardment Squadron, Very Heavy on 5 August 1945
Inactivated on 17 October 1945

- Redesignated 787th Tactical Fighter Squadron on 9 February 1965 and activated (not organized)

Organized on 1 April 1965
Inactivated on 20 June 1965

- Converted to provisional status and redesignated 787th Air Expeditionary Squadron on 24 April 2006

Active July 2006
Activated c. 18 November 2014
Inactivated c. 13 February 2015

=== Assignments ===
- 466th Bombardment Group, 1 August 1943 – 17 October 1945
- Tactical Air Command, 9 February 1965 (not organized)
- 33d Tactical Fighter Wing, 1 April–20 June 1965
- United States Air Forces Europe to activate or inactivate as needed after 24 April 2006

Attached to 86th Airlift Wing, July 2006
Attached to 435th Air Ground Operations Wing, c. 18 November 2014 – c. 13 February 2015

=== Stations ===
- Alamogordo Army Air Field, New Mexico, 1 August 1943
- Kearns Army Air Base, Utah 31 August 1943
- Alamogordo Army Air Field, New Mexico, 30 November 1943 - 10 February 1944
- RAF Attlebridge (AAF-120), England 9 March 1944 - c. 6 July 1945
- Sioux Falls Army Air Field, South Dakota, 15 July 1945
- Pueblo Army Air Base, Colorado, 25 July 1945
- Davis-Monthan Field, Arizona, 15 August-17 October 1945
- Eglin Air Force Base, Florida, 1 April–20 June 1965
- Karadje, Niger, July 2006
- Léopold Sédar Senghor International Airport, Senegal, c. 18 November 2014 – c. 13 February 2015

=== Aircraft ===
- Consolidated B-24 Liberator, 1943–1945
- Boeing B-29 Superfortress, 1945
- McDonnell F-4 Phantom, 1965
- Lockheed C-130J Hercules

=== Awards and campaigns ===
Award streamer	Award	Dates	Notes
	Air Force Meritorious Unit Award	1 January 2015-31 December 2015	787th Air Expeditionary Squadron

Campaign Streamer	Campaign	Dates	Notes
	Air Offensive, Europe	8 March 1944 – 5 June 1944	787th Bombardment Squadron
	Air Combat, EAME Theater	8 March 1944 – 11 May 1945	787th Bombardment Squadron
	Normandy	6 June 1944 – 24 July 1944	787th Bombardment Squadron
	Northern France	25 July 1944 – 14 September 1944	787th Bombardment Squadron
	Rhineland	15 September 1944 – 21 March 1945	787th Bombardment Squadron
	Ardennes-Alsace	16 December 1944 – 25 January 1945	787th Bombardment Squadron
	Central Europe	22 March 1944 – 21 May 1945	787th Bombardment Squadron

== See also ==
- List of C-130 Hercules operators
- List of F-4 Phantom II operators
- List of B-29 Superfortress operators
- B-24 Liberator units of the United States Army Air Forces
