= 467th Bombardment Group =

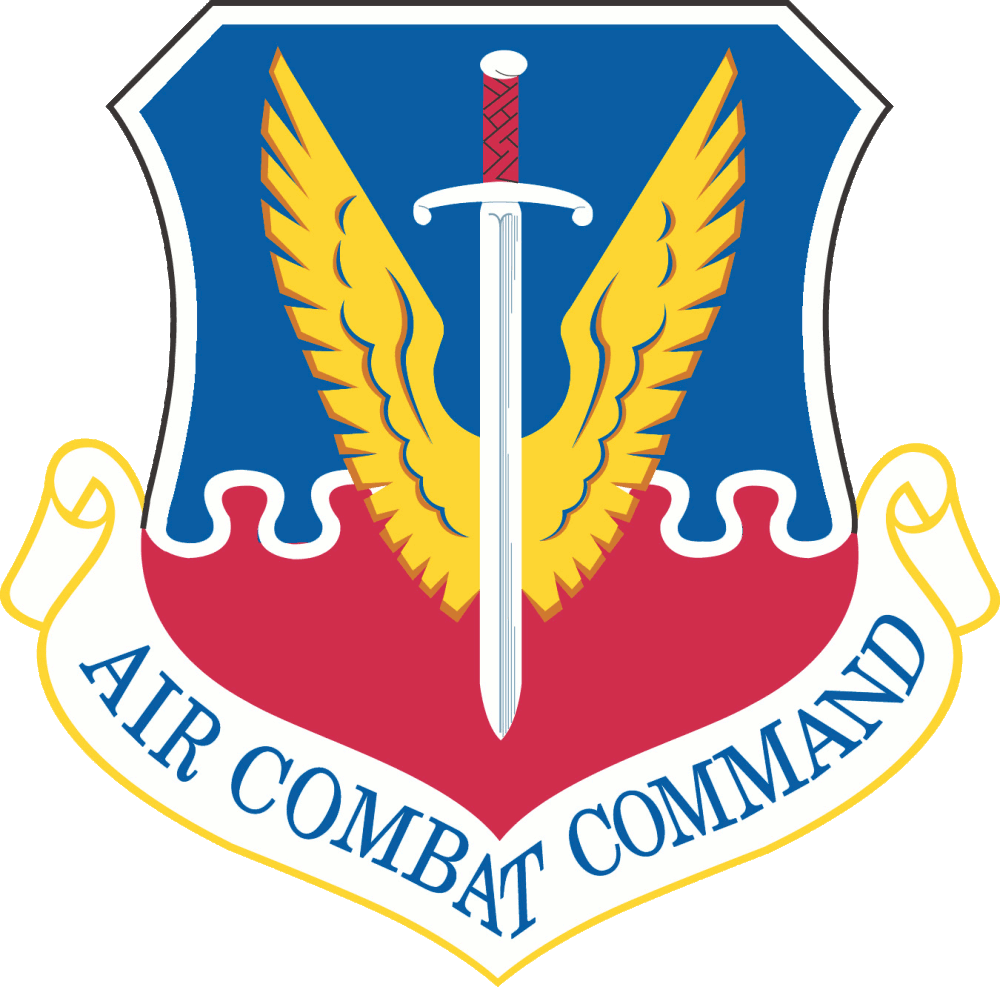
467th Bombardment Group (later 467th Air Expeditionary Group)

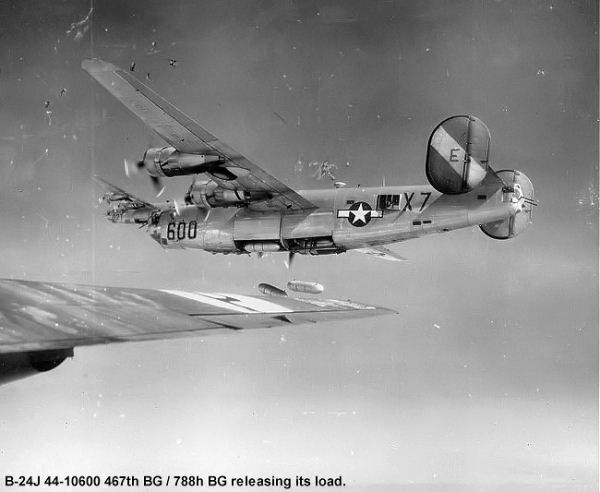
- 788th Bombardment Squadron B-24 Liberator (Note: Aircraft is Consolidated B-24J-65-CF Liberator, serial 44-10600 of the 788th Bomb Squadron.)
- Active: 1943–1946, 2010–unknown
- Country: United States
- Branch: United States Air Force
- Role: Heavy bomber, support of expeditionary forces
- Part of: Air Combat Command
- Nickname: Rackheath Aggies (World War II)
- Motto: Liberamus (Latin for 'We Liberate')

Insignia
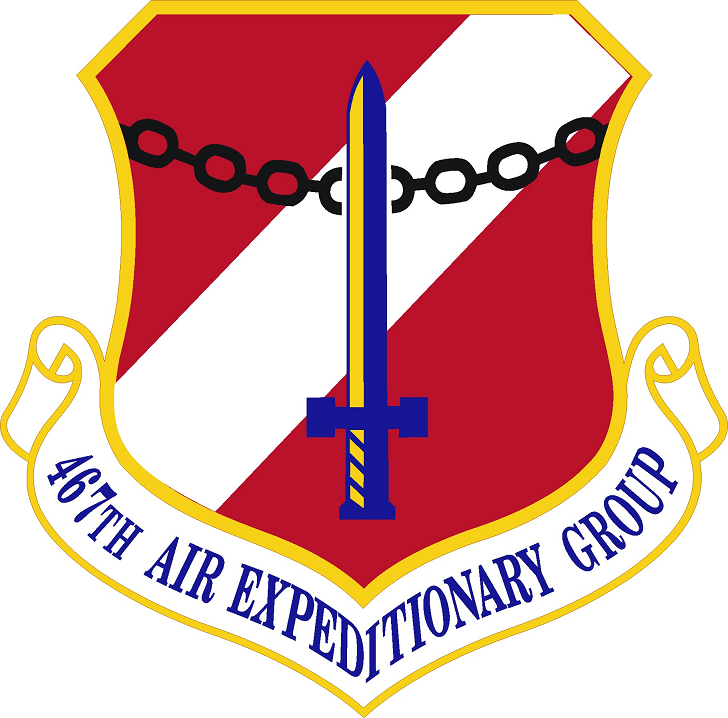
- 467th Air Expeditionary Group emblem

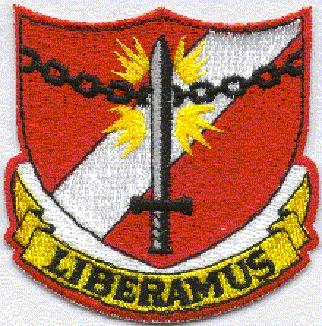
- 467th Bombardment Group emblem

[ The 467th Bombardment Group is an inactive United States Army Air Forces unit. Its last assignment was to the Strategic Air Command, at Clovis Army Air Field, New Mexico, where it was inactivated on 4 August 1946.

During World War II, the group was an Eighth Air Force Consolidated B-24 Liberator unit in England stationed at RAF Rackheath. The group set unsurpassed record for bombing accuracy on 15 April 1945, holding the record for bombing accuracy in the Eighth Air Force. They destroyed a German battery at Pointe de Grave, on the west coast of France and scored a 100 per cent strike. The group commander, Colonel Albert J. Shower, was the only group commander to stay with the same group from beginning to the end of the war. Returned to the United States in July 1945, converted to B-29 Superfortresses and trained for deployment to the Pacific Theater. Deployment to Okinawa cancelled with the end of the Pacific War in August 1945.

After training completed, moved to Clovis AAF, New Mexico and was one of the original ten USAAF bombardment groups assigned to Strategic Air Command on 21 March 1946. The group was inactivated on 4 August 1946 due to the Air Force's policy of retaining only low-numbered groups on active duty after the war, and its B-29 aircraft, personnel and equipment were reassigned to the senior 301st Bombardment Group at Smoky Hill Army Air Field, Kansas.

In 2010, the group was converted to provisional status as the 467th Air Expeditionary Group and activated to support airmen deployed throughout the country.

== History ==
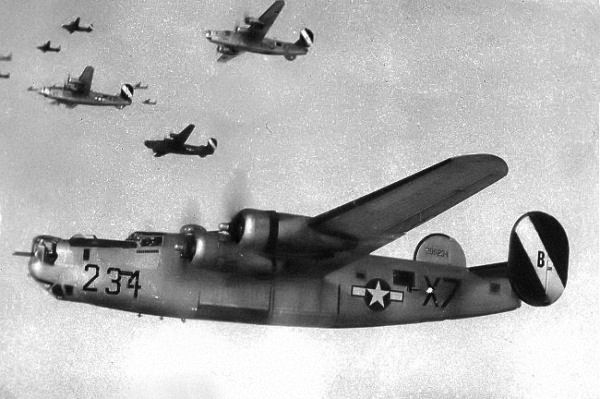
B-24H Liberator of the 788th Bomb Squadron (Note: Aircraft is Ford Motors built Consolidated B-24H-25-FO Liberator, serial 42-95234 Weiser Witch. This aircraft crash landed at RAF Bungay on 5 May 1945 after fire in the nose.)

Established as a Consolidated B-24 Liberator heavy bombardment group in mid-1943 at Mountain Home Army Air Field, Idaho, and activated on 8 September. Transferred to Kearns Center, Utah for personnel assignment and organization then sent to Wendover Field, Utah for combat training on 1 November.

In January the group received deployment orders for the European Theater of Operations (ETO). On 12 February 1944 the ground unit went by train to Camp Shanks, New York. They sailed on the USAT Frederick Lykes on 28 February 1944 and arrived in Clyde on 10 March 1944. The aircraft left Wendover on 12 February 1944 and took the southern Atlantic ferry route. One B-24 was lost with all the crew over the Atlas mountains. Moved to RAF Rackheath, Norfolk in England, February–March 1944, and was assigned to the VIII Bomber Command. The group was assigned to the 96th Combat Bombardment Wing, and the group tail code was a "Circle-P".

The mission of the 467th was to engage in very long range strategic bombardment operations over Occupied Europe and Nazi Germany. The group began operations on 10 April 1944 with an attack by thirty aircraft on an airfield at Bourges in central France. In combat, the unit served chiefly as a strategic bombardment organization, attacking the harbor at Kiel, chemical plants at Bonn, textile factories at Stuttgart, power plants at Hamm, steel works at Osnabrück, the aircraft industry at Brunswick, and other objectives.

In addition to strategic operations, engaged occasionally in support and interdictory missions. Bombed shore installations and bridges near Cherbourg Naval Base on D-Day, 6 June 1944. Struck enemy troop and supply concentrations near Montreuil on 25 July 1944 to assist the Allied drive across France.

In September, over two weeks the bombers flew gasoline from Rackheath to Clastres Airfield (A-71) France for use by the US mechanized forces. Attacked German communications and fortifications during the Battle of the Bulge, December 1944 – January 1945. Hit enemy transportation to assist the Allied assault across the Rhine in March 1945.

After the German Capitulation in May 1945, the group was ordered back to the United States for B-29 transition and redeployment to the Pacific Theater of Operations. Redeployed to the US June/July 1945. The air echelon departed Rackheath on 12 June 1945. The ground units sailed from Greenock on the RMS Queen Mary on 6 July 1945. They arrived in New York on 11 July 1945. Upon arrival, most of the group was demobilized due to their combat service in Europe; a cadre of officers and men was formed at Sioux Falls Army Air Field, South Dakota on 25 August.

At Sioux Falls, the unit was redesignated as the 467th Bombardment Group, Very Heavy in August and was reformed with newly trained pilots, aircrews and ground personnel. The reformed group was sent to Harvard Army Air Field, Nebraska for initial Second Air Force training then on to Phase II training at Alamogordo Army Air Field, New Mexico where the group trained on worn II Bomber Command B-17s and some pre-production YB-29s used for aircrew training. The Japanese Capitulation in early August canceled the planned deployment to the Pacific, however the group continued to train

Due to the advanced training state of the unit, it move to Harvard Army Air Field, Nebraska, where the group received new Boeing B-29 Superfortresses and completed training. In December 1945 was assigned to a permanent base at Clovis Army Air Field, New Mexico as part of Continental Air Forces.

Engaged in strategic bombardment training operations on a reduced scale upon arrival at Clovis, as many personnel were being demobilized. On 21 March 1946, was assigned as one of the initial units of the new Strategic Air Command. The unit, however was inactivated on 4 August due to personnel shortages and funding reductions in the immediate postwar Air Force. The equipment and remaining personnel were reassigned to other SAC units, primarily the 301st Bombardment Group at Smoky Hill Army Air Field, Kansas.

=== Expeditionary operations ===
The group was redesignated the 467th Air Expeditionary Group and assigned to Air Combat Command to activate and inactivate as needed. It was activated at Balad Air Base, Iraq in November 2010. The group assumed the mission, equipment and personnel of the 732nd Air Expeditionary Group, which was simultaneously inactivated. The group provided administrative and operational control of "Joint Expeditionary Tasked Airmen" and to "Individual Augmentee Airmen." It was inactivated on an unknown date.

=== Lineage ===
- Constituted as the 467th Bombardment Group (Heavy) on 19 May 1943

Activated on 1 August 1943
Redesignated 467th Bombardment Group (Very Heavy) in August 1945
Inactivated on 4 August 1946
Converted to provisional status and redesignated 467th Air Expeditionary Group on 25 February 2010
Activated c. 12 November 2010
Inactivated unknown

=== Assignments ===
- II Bomber Command, 1 August 1943
- Second Air Force, 6 October 1943 – 12 February 1944
- 96th Combat Bombardment Wing, 7 March 1944 – 12 June 1945
- Second Air Force, 15 July 1945
- Strategic Air Command, 21 March – 4 August 1946
- Air Combat Command, 25 February 2010

Air Component Coordination Element-Iraq, c. 12 November 2010 – unknown

=== Components ===
- 788th Bombardment Squadron, 1 August 1943 – 4 August 1946
- 789th Bombardment Squadron, 1 August 1943 – 4 August 1946
- 790th Bombardment Squadron, 1 August 1943 – 4 August 1946
- 791st Bombardment Squadron, 1 August 1943 – 4 August 1946

=== Stations ===
- Wendover Field, Utah, 1 August 1943 – 8 September 1943
- Mountain Home Army Air Field, Idaho, 8 September 1943 – 17 October 1943
- Kearns Army Air Field, Utah 17 October 1943 – 1 November 1943
- Wendover Field, Utah, 1 November 1943 – 12 February 1944
- RAF Rackheath (AAF-145), England, 11 March 1944 – 12 June 1945
- Sioux Falls Army Air Field, South Dakota, 15 July 1945
- Fairmont Army Air Field, Nebraska, 25 July 1945
- Alamogordo Army Air Field

Elements trained at Albuquerque Army Air Base, New Mexico, 22 August 1945

- Harvard Army Air Field, Nebraska, 8 September 1945 – December 1945
- Clovis Army Air Field, New Mexico, December 1945 – 4 August 1946
- Balad Air Base, Iraq, c. 12 November 2010 – unknown

=== Aircraft ===
- Consolidated B-24 Liberator, 1943–1945
- B-17 Flying Fortress, 1945–1946
- Boeing B-29 Superfortress, 1946
