= Montreuil, Eure-et-Loir =

Montreuil
- Commune
- Location of Montreuil
- Location within France Location within Centre-Val de Loire
- Coordinates: 48°46′38″N 1°22′03″E
- Country: France
- Region: Centre-Val de Loire
- Department: Eure-et-Loir
- Arrondissement: Dreux
- Canton: Anet
- Intercommunality: CA Pays de Dreux

Government
  - Mayor (2020–2026): Denis Chéron
- Area^{1}: 6.21 km^{2} (2.40 sq mi)
- Elevation: 78 m (256 ft)
- Highest elevation: 135 m (443 ft)
- Lowest elevation: 68 m (223 ft)
- Population (2023): 538
  - Density: 86.6/km^{2} (224/sq mi)
- Time zone: UTC+01:00 (CET)
  - Summer (DST): UTC+02:00 (CEST)
- INSEE/Postal code: 28267 /28500
- ^{1} French Land Register data, which excludes lakes, ponds, glaciers > 1 km^{2} (0.386 sq mi or 247 acres) and river estuaries.

Montreuil (French pronunciation: [mɔ̃tʁœj]) is a commune in the Eure-et-Loir department in northern France.

== World War II ==
After the liberation of the area by Allied Forces in 1944, engineers of the Ninth Air Force IX Engineering Command began construction of a combat Advanced Landing Ground outside of the town. Declared operational on 4 September, the airfield was designated as "A-38", it was used by the 363d Tactical Reconnaissance Group which flew photo-recon aircraft from the airfield until early October when the unit moved into Central France. Afterward, the airfield was closed.

== Population ==
Historical population
Year	Pop.	±% p.a.
1968	250	—
1975	255	+0.28%
1982	513	+10.50%
1990	513	+0.00%
1999	490	−0.51%
2007	510	+0.50%
2012	502	−0.32%
2017	508	+0.24%
2023	538	+0.96%
Source: INSEE

== See also ==
- Communes of the Eure-et-Loir department
