= 708th Bombardment Squadron =

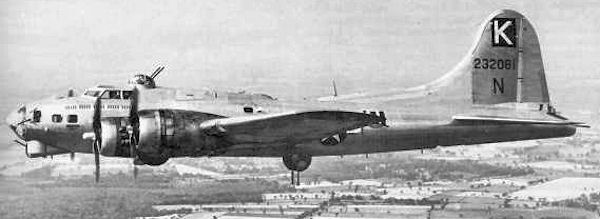
- 708th Squadron B-17G Flying Fortress (Note: Aircraft is Boeing B-17G-35-BO Flying Fortress, serial 42-32081, Yellow Cab, CQ-N. It was hit by flak on 4 November 1944 and crashed into the English Channel killing all nine on board. Baugher, Joe (10 April 2023). "1942 USAF Serial Numbers". Joe Baugher. Missing Air Crew Report 10162.)
- Active: 1943–1945; 1947–1951
- Country: United States
- Branch: United States Air Force
- Role: Heavy bomber
- Colors: Yellow (World Waar II)
- Engagements: European Theater of Operations

Insignia
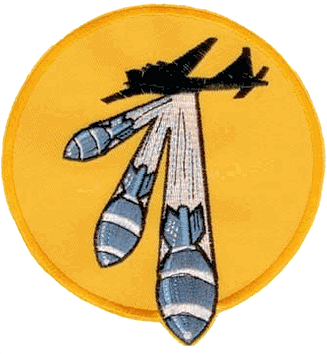
- 708th Bombardment Squadron Emblem (Note: Approved 6 September 1943. Description: Over and through a yellow-orange disc, a black silhouette four-motor aircraft in sinister chief, dropping a stick of three blue violet aerial bombs to foreground and leaving air stream to rear shaded light blue violet.)
- Fuselage Code: CQ
- 447th Bombardment Group tail marking: Square K

The 708th Bombardment Squadron is an inactive United States Air Force unit. It was last assigned to the 447th Bombardment Group at Castle Air Force Base, California, where it was inactivated on 16 June 1951.

The squadron was established as a heavy bomber squadron in 1943. After training in the United States with Boeing B-17 Flying Fortresses, it deployed to the European Theater of Operations, where it engaged in the strategic bombing campaign against Germany. After V-E Day, the squadron returned to the United States and was inactivated. It was reactivated in the reserve in 1947 and served until it was called to active duty in 1951 as a result of the Korean War and its personnel used as fillers for other units.

== History ==
=== World War II ===
==== Training in the United States ====
The squadron was first activated on 1 May 1943 at Ephrata Army Air Base, Washington as the 708th Bombardment Squadron, one of the four original squadrons of the 447th Bombardment Group.

The original mission of the squadron was to be an Operational Training Unit. However, by the time the 447th Group reached full strength in October, it had been identified for overseas deployment and its key personnel were sent to the Army Air Forces School of Applied Tactics at Orlando Army Air Base, Florida for advanced tactical training. The cadre trained at Brooksville Army Air Field with the 1st Bombardment Squadron, engaging in simulated attacks against Mobile, Alabama, Charleston, South Carolina and New Orleans, Louisiana. The squadron then trained at Rapid City Army Air Base, South Dakota with the 17th Bombardment Training Wing. In June 1943 the group moved to Harvard Army Air Field, Nebraska for Phase I training. The squadron's B-17s began to move from the United States to the European theater of operations in November 1943. The ground echelon departed for the port of embarkation on 11 November 1943 and sailed for England on the RMS Queen Mary on 23 November.

==== Combat in the European Theater ====
The squadron was stationed at RAF Rattlesden, England, from December 1943 to August 1945. It flew its first combat mission on 24 December 1943 against a V-1 flying bomb launch site near Saint-Omer in Northern France.

From December 1943 to May 1944, the squadron helped prepare for the invasion of the European continent by attacking submarine pens, naval installations, and cities in Germany; missile sites and ports in France; and airfields and marshaling yards in France, Belgium and Germany. The squadron conducted heavy bombardment missions against German aircraft industry during Big Week, 20 to 25 February 1944.

The unit supported Operation Overlord, the invasion of Normandy in June 1944 by bombing airfields and other targets. On D-Day the squadron bombed the beachhead area using pathfinder aircraft.

The squadron aided in Operation Cobra, the breakthrough at Saint Lo, France, and the effort to take Brest, France, from July to September 1944. It bombed strategic targets from October to December 1944, concentrating on sources of oil production. It assaulted marshalling yards, railroad bridges and communication centers during the Battle of the Bulge from December 1944 to January 1945. One of the squadron’s most notable aircraft was the B-17G Fuddy Duddy. On 30 December 1944, while en route to bomb Mannheim, Germany, Fuddy Duddy was lost after colliding with another B-17 in the formation. ln March 1945 the group bombed an airfield in support of Operation Varsity, the airborne assault across the Rhine. The unit flew its last combat mission on 21 April 1945 against a marshalling yard at Ingolstadt, Germany.

The 708th redeployed to the United States during the summer 1945. The air echelon ferried their aircraft and personnel back to the United States, leaving on 29 and 30 June 1945. The squadron ground echelon, along with the group headquarters and 710th Squadron sailed on the SS Joseph T. Robinson on 1 August 1945, from Liverpool. Most personnel were discharged at Camp Myles Standish after arrival at the port of Boston. A small cadre proceeded to Drew Field, Florida and the squadron inactivated on 7 November 1945.

=== Reserve operations ===
The 707th Bombardment Squadron was activated again under Air Defense Command (ADC) in the reserves on 10 November 1947 at Bergstrom Field, Texas. In July 1948, Continental Air Command (ConAC) assumed reserve training responsibility for reserve and Air National Guard units from ADC. It was nominally a Boeing B-29 Superfortress very heavy bombardment squadron, although it is not certain that it was equipped or fully manned.

The May 1949 Air Force Reserve program called for a new type of unit, the Corollary Unit, which was a reserve unit integrated with an active duty unit. The plan was viewed as the best method to train reservists by mixing them with an existing regular unit to perform duties alongside the regular unit. The squadron moved to Castle Air Force Base, California in June 1949, where it became a "Medium" unit in June 1949 and a corollary of the 93d Bombardment Wing, which was the regular combat wing at Castle. In May 1951, the squadron was mobilized for the Korean War, as were all reserve corollary units, and its personnel were used as fillers for other units, while the squadron was inactivated on 16 June.

== Lineage ==
- Constituted as the 708th Bombardment Squadron (Heavy) on 6 April 1943

Activated on 1 May 1943
Redesignated 708th Bombardment Squadron, Heavy on 20 August 1943
Inactivated on 7 November 1945

- Redesignated 708th Bombardment Squadron, Very Heavy on 24 October 1947

Activated in the reserve on 10 November 1947
Redesignated 708th Bombardment Squadron, Medium on 27 June 1949
Ordered to active service on 1 May 1951
Inactivated on 16 June 1951

=== Assignments ===
- 447th Bombardment Group, 1 May 1943 – 7 November 1945
- 447th Bombardment Group, 10 November 1947 – 16 June 1951

=== Stations ===
- Ephrata Army Air Base, Washington, 1 May 1943
- Rapid City Army Air Field, South Dakota, 13 June 1943
- Harvard Army Air Field, Nebraska, 1 August 1943 – 11 November 1943
- RAF Rattlesden (AAF-126), England, 1 December 1943 – c. 1 August 1945
- Drew Field, Florida, 14 August 1945 – 7 November 1945
- Bergstrom Field (later Bergstrom Air Force Base), Texas, 10 November 1947
- Castle Air Force Base, California, 27 June 1949 – 16 June 1951

=== Aircraft ===
- Boeing B-17 Flying Fortress, 1943–1945
- Boeing B-29 Superfortress, 1949–1950
- Boeing B-50 Superfortress, 1949–1950

=== Campaigns ===
Campaign Streamer	Campaign	Dates	Notes
	American Theater	1 May 1943 – 11 November 1943	
	Air Offensive, Europe	29 November 1943 – 5 June 1944	
	Normandy	6 June 1944 – 24 July 1944	
	Northern France	25 July 1944 – 14 September 1944	
	Rhineland	15 September 1944 – 21 March 1945	
	Ardennes-Alsace	16 December 1944 – 25 January 1945	
	Central Europe	22 March 1944 – 21 May 1945	

== See also ==
- List of B-29 Superfortress operators
