= RAF Rattlesden =

Former Royal Air Force station in Suffolk, England

RAF Rattlesden USAAF Station 126
- Located Near Bury St Edmunds, Suffolk, United Kingdom
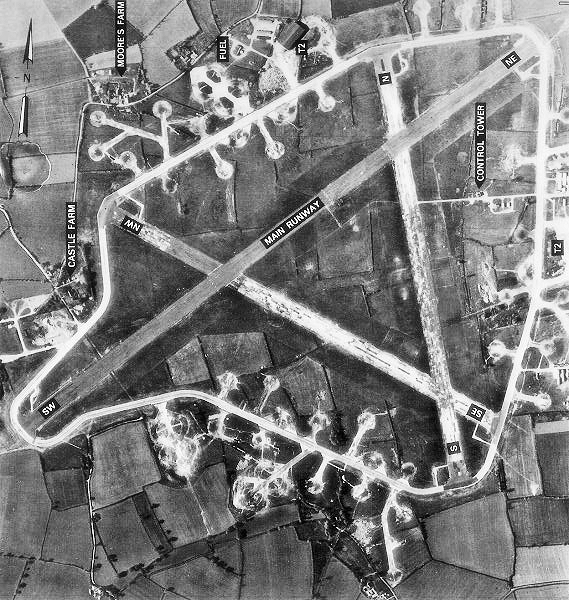
- Rattlesden Airfield - 7 May 1946

Site information
- Type: Royal Air Force station
- Code: RS
- Owner: Air Ministry
- Controlled by: Royal Air Force; United States Army Air Forces

Location
- Location in Suffolk
- Coordinates: 52°10′03″N 000°51′52″E

Site history
- Built: 1942
- In use: 1942-1946
- Battles/wars: European Theatre of World War II; Air Offensive, Europe July 1942 - May 1945

Garrison information
- Garrison: Eighth Air Force; RAF Technical Training Command
- Occupants: 322nd Bombardment Group; 447th Bombardment Group

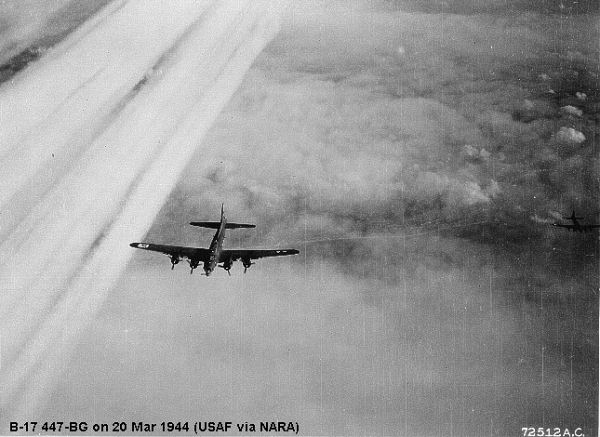
B-17 of the 447th Bomb Group inflight en route to attack a Propeller plant at Frankfurt, Germany - 20 March 1944.

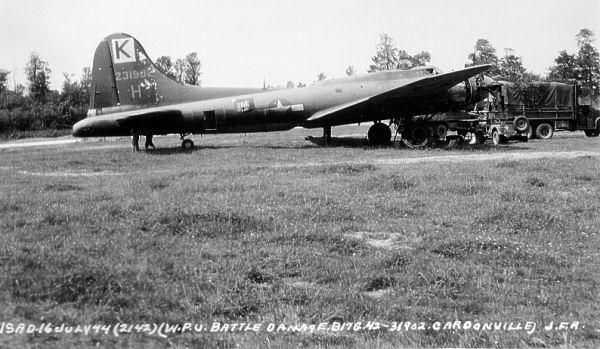
Battle damaged Boeing B-17G-30-BO Fortress Serial 42-31902 of the 447th Bomb Group at Rattlesden after a mission whose operational objective was a jet engine plant in Stuttgart, Germany, July 1944.

The Royal Air Force Rattlesden or more simply RAF Rattlesden is a former Royal Air Force station located 9 miles (14 km) south east of Bury St Edmunds, Suffolk, England.

== History ==
=== USAAF use ===
The Rattlesden airfield was built in 1942 as a Class A bomber airfield. The airfield had three intersecting concrete runways, perimeter track and, for USAAF use, hardstands for fifty aircraft and two dispersed, black-painted T-2 hangars. Living and messing sites were on the east side of the field. It is situated four miles south of the A14 highway between Stowmarket and Bury St. Edmunds

The airfield was opened in 1942 and was used by the United States Army Air Forces Eighth Air Force. Rattlesden was given USAAF designation Station 126 (RS).

==== 322d Bombardment Group (Medium) ====
Rattlesden was originally designated as a satellite for RAF Bury St. Edmunds with both airfields being assigned to the 3rd Bomb Wing which controlled most of the USAAF assigned airfields in Suffolk. The mission of the 3d Bomb Wing was medium bombardment and Rattlesden was destined to receive Martin B-26 Marauders when, in December 1942, the ground personnel of two squadrons of the 322d Bombardment Group (Medium) arrived from Drew AAF, Florida in April 1943. The squadrons were moved to RAF Bury St. Edmunds after a decision to establish one group per airfield.

==== 447th Bombardment Group (Heavy) ====
In June 1943, it was decided that the B-26 groups would be better placed to conduct operations from airfields further south and an exchange of bases with the B-17-equipped 4th Bombardment Wing in Essex was arranged. Rattlesden, however, remained without a combat unit until the 447th Bombardment Group (Heavy) arrived from Harvard AAF Nebraska on 29 November 1943. The 447th was assigned a group tail code "Square-K". Its operational squadrons were:

- 708th Bombardment Squadron (CQ)
- 709th Bombardment Squadron (IE)
- 710th Bombardment Squadron (IJ)
- 711th Bombardment Squadron (IR)

The group flew the Boeing B-17 Flying Fortress as part of the Eighth Air Force's strategic bombing campaign and served chiefly as a strategic bombardment organization. The 447th's first mission from Rattlesden was despatched on the Christmas Eve and, during the course of hostilities, another 256 missions were flown from the base.

The group helped prepare for the invasion of the Continent by attacking submarine pens, naval installations and cities in Germany; ports and missile sites in France, and airfields and marshalling yards in France, Belgium and Germany. During Big Week, 20–25 February 1944, the 447th took part in the intensive campaign of heavy bombers against the German aircraft industry. It supported the invasion of Normandy in June 1944 by bombing airfields and other targets near the beachhead. Aided the breakthrough at Saint-Lô in July and the effort to take Brest in September. Pounded enemy positions to assist the airborne invasion of the Netherlands in September. Also dropped supplies to Free French Forces during the summer of 1944.

The 447th turned to strategic targets in Germany in October 1944, placing emphasis on sources of oil production until mid-December. 2nd Lt Robert Edward Femoyer, navigator, won the Medal of Honor for action on 2 November 1944. While on a mission over Germany, his B-17 was damaged by flak and Femoyer was severely wounded by shell fragments. Determined to navigate the plane out of danger and save the crew, he refused a sedative and, for more than two hours, directed the navigation of the bomber so effectively that it returned to base without further damage. Femoyer died shortly after being removed from the plane.

During the Battle of the Bulge, December 1944-January 1945, the group assaulted marshalling yards, railroad bridges, and communications centers in the combat zone. Then resumed operations against targets in Germany, attacking oil, transportation, communications, and other objectives until the war ended. During this period, also supported the airborne assault across the Rhine in March.

The group returned to Drew AAF Florida in August 1945, its personnel relieved from active duty and aircraft sent to storage. At Drew AAF the 447th was redesignated as the "447th Bombardment Group (Very Heavy)" and allocated to Strategic Air Command w/o/p/e as a reserve unit.

=== Postwar Governmental use ===
After the war, the field was transferred to the RAF on 10 October 1945. For a short while it was used by the RAF for basic training and then as a Ministry of Food buffer depot but was finally inactivated on 15 August 1946. In the 1960s part of the site was used for RAF Bristol Bloodhound surface to air missiles but when this was abandoned the whole airfield was sold during 1967/68.

== Current use ==
With the end of military control the land was returned to agricultural use.

Today there is not much left of the living and mess sites of the airfield, only part of the main runway and the south & eastern part of the perimeter track still exist plus a few of the hardstands. The most complete area of the airfield today is the Technical No. 1, east of the airfield which still has around 20 buildings left including the large T-2 hangar. The Rattlesden Gliding Group uses the southwest end of the former main runway, with one lane of the former southwest perimeter track being used as a taxiway. The control tower is their club house.

== See also ==
- List of former Royal Air Force stations
