= 710th Airlift Squadron =

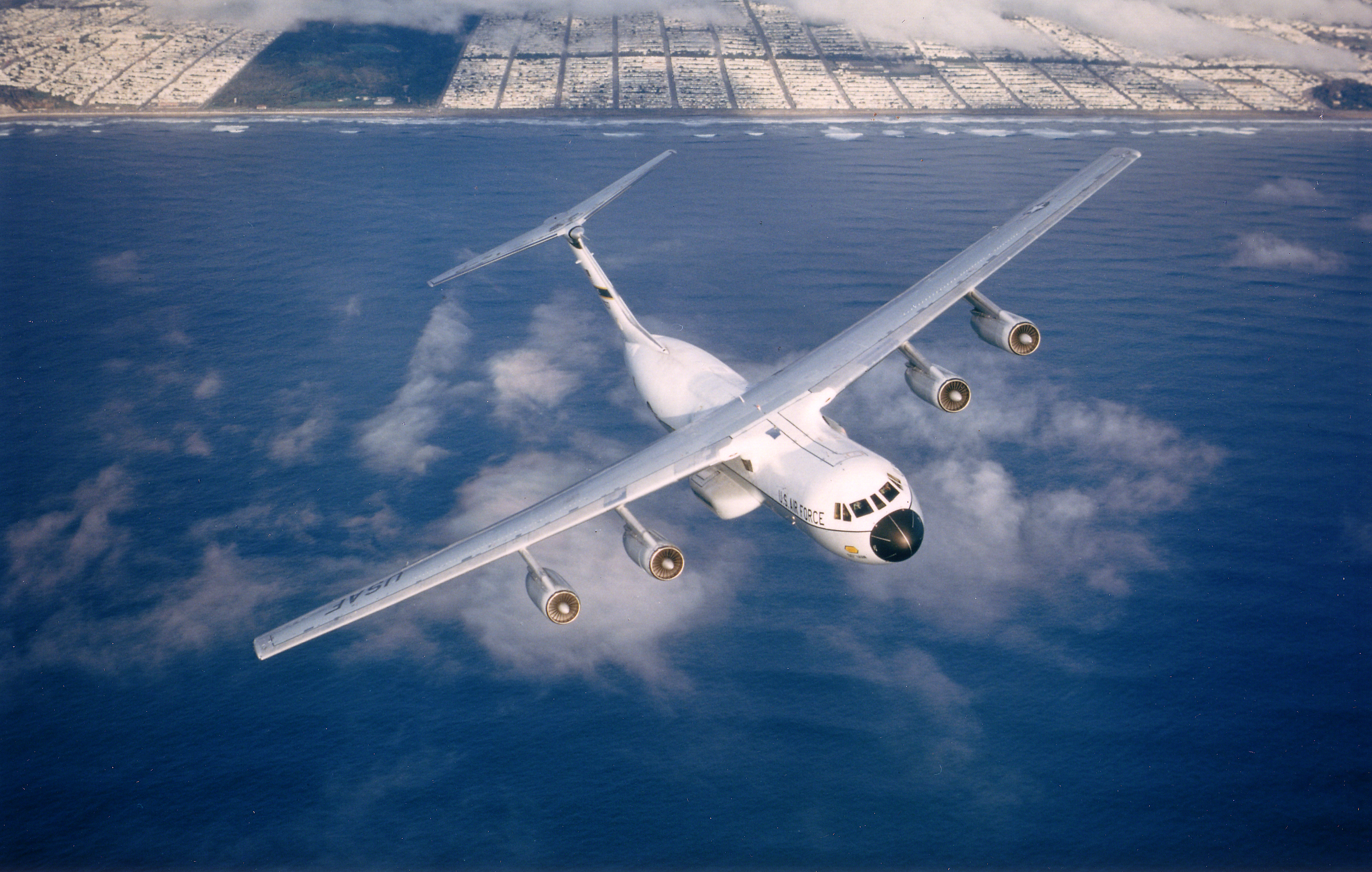
- A Lockheed C-141A Starlifter flown by the 710th Military Airlift Squadron over the Pacific Ocean near San Francisco
- Active: 1943–1945; 1973–1998
- Country: United States
- Branch: United States Air Force
- Role: Air Operations
- Colors: Red (World War II)
- Engagements: European Theater of Operations
- Decorations: Air Force Outstanding Unit Award

Insignia
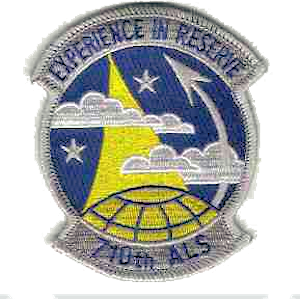
- Patch showing 710th Airlift Squadron emblem

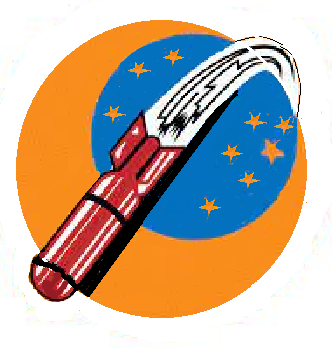
- 710th Bombardment Squadron emblem (Note: Approved 6 September 1943. Description: Over and through a disc formed by a decrescent moon yellow orange, imposed on a field of light blue, flecked with eleven yellow stars, a red comet aerial bomb banded black, leaving trail white to rear, and casting dark, wide drop shadow.)
- ETO Fuselage Code: IF
- 447th Bombardment Group tail marking: Square K

The 710th Airlift Squadron is an inactive United States Air Force Unit. It was last active in the reserves in 1998.

The squadron was established as the 710th Bombardment Squadron, a heavy bomber squadron. After training in the United States, it deployed to the European Theatre of Operations, where it participated in the strategic bombing campaign against Germany. It returned to the United States and was inactivated in November 1945.

The 710th Airlift Squadron was reactivated and redesignated in 1968. It was an associate airlift squadron of the 60th Air Mobility Wing, assigned to the 349th Operations Group at Travis Air Force Base, California, where it was inactivated on 1 January 1998.

== History ==
=== World War II ===
==== Training in the United States ====
The squadron was first activated on 1 May 1943 at Ephrata Army Air Base, Washington as the 710th Bombardment Squadron, one of the four original squadrons of the 447th Bombardment Group.

The original mission of the squadron was to be an Operational Training Unit. However, by the time the 447th Group reached full strength in October it had been identified for overseas deployment and its key personnel were sent to the Army Air Forces School of Applied Tactics at Orlando Army Air Base, Florida for advanced tactical training. The cadre trained at Brooksville Army Air Field with the 1st Bombardment Squadron, engaging in simulated attacks against Mobile, Alabama, Charleston, South Carolina and New Orleans. The squadron then trained at Rapid City Army Air Base, South Dakota with the 17th Bombardment Training Wing. In June 1943 the unit moved to Harvard Army Air Field, Nebraska for Phase I training. The unit sailed on the RMS Queen Elizabeth on 23 November 1943 and arrived at the Firth of Clyde on 29 November 1943. The squadron's B-17s began to move from the United States to the European theater of operations in November 1943.

==== Combat in the European Theater ====
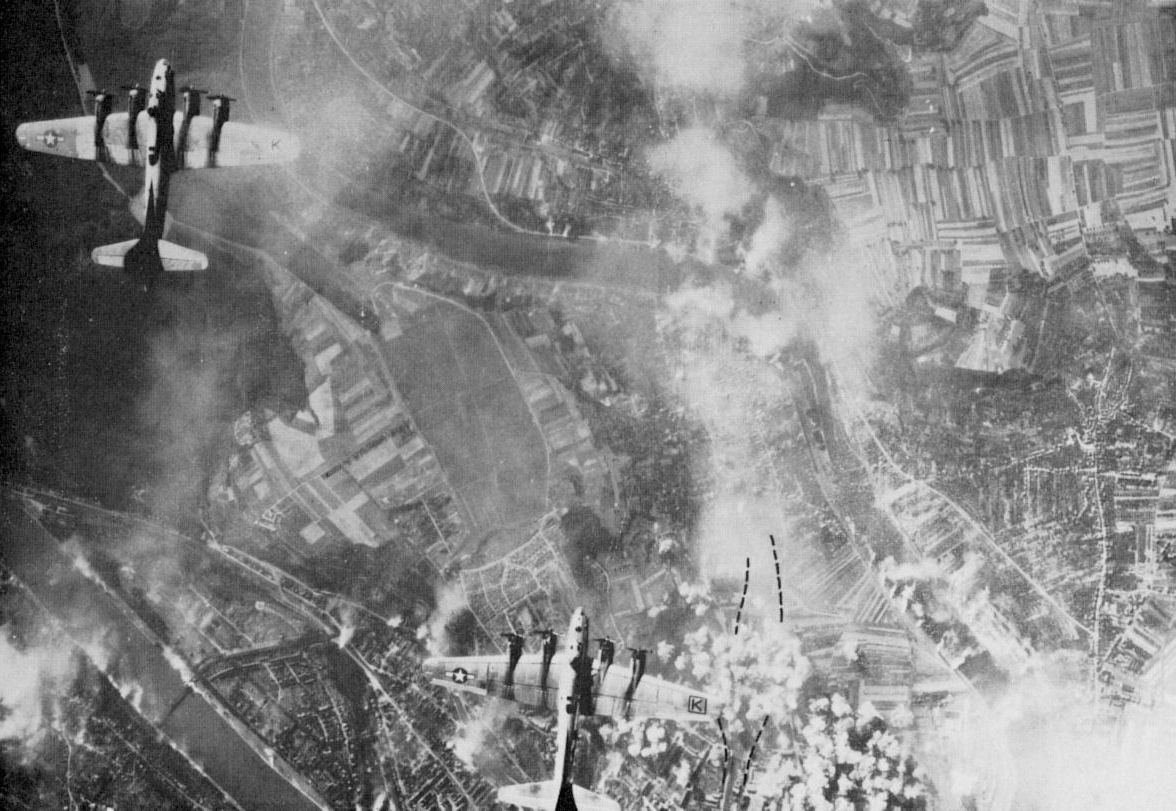
B-17s of the 447th Bombardment Group attacking Koblenz 19 September 1944

The squadron was stationed at RAF Rattlesden, England, from December 1943 to August 1945. It flew its first combat mission on 24 December 1943 against a V-1 flying bomb launch site near Saint-Omer in Northern France.

From December 1943 to May 1944, the squadron helped prepare for the invasion of the European continent by attacking submarine pens, naval installations, and cities in Germany; missile sites and ports in France; and airfields and marshaling yards in France, Belgium and Germany. The squadron conducted heavy bombardment missions against German aircraft industry during Big Week, 20 to 25 February 1944.

The unit supported Operation Overlord, the invasion of Normandy in June 1944 by bombing airfields and other targets. On D-Day the squadron bombed the beachhead area using pathfinder aircraft.

The squadron aided in Operation Cobra, the breakthrough at Saint Lo, France, and the effort to take Brest, France, from July to September 1944. It bombed strategic targets from October to December 1944, concentrating on sources of oil production. It assaulted marshalling yards, railroad bridges and communication centers during the Battle of the Bulge from December 1944 to January 1945. In March 1945 the group bombed an airfield in support of Operation Varsity, the airborne assault across the Rhine. The unit flew its last combat mission on 21 April 1945 against a marshalling yard at Ingolstadt, Germany.

The 710th redeployed to the United States during the summer 1945. The air echelon ferried their aircraft and personnel back to the United States, leaving on 29 and 30 June 1945. The squadron ground echelon, along with the group headquarters and 708th squadron sailed on the SS Joseph T. Robinson on 1 August 1945, from Liverpool. Most personnel were discharged at Camp Myles Standish after arrival at the port of Boston. A small cadre proceeded to Drew Field, Florida and the squadron inactivated on 7 November 1945.

=== Reserve airlift operations ===
By 1968, the Air Force Reserve formed associate units. In this program, reserve units flew and maintained aircraft owned by an associated regular unit. The squadron was redesignated the 710th Military Airlift Squadron and activated under the 349th Military Airlift Wing as an associate of Military Airlift Command's 60th Military Airlift Wing at Travis Air Force Base, California in the spring of 1973. The squadron flew the 60th Wing's Lockheed C-141 Starlifters on worldwide transport missions. The squadron provided support to the State of California during the 1992 Los Angeles riots. The squadron was inactivated in 1998 as part of phaseout of C-141s.

== Lineage ==
- Constituted as the 710th Bombardment Squadron (Heavy) on 6 April 1943

Activated on 1 May 1943

- Redesignated 710th Bombardment Squadron, Heavy on 20 August 1943

Inactivated on 7 November 1945

- Redesignated 710th Military Airlift Squadron (Associate) on 19 June 1973

Activated in the reserve on 1 July 1973
Redesignated 710th Airlift Squadron (Associate) on 1 February 1992
Redesignated 710th Airlift Squadron on 1 October 1994
Inactivated on 1 January 1998

=== Assignments ===
- 447th Bombardment Group, 1 May 1943 – 7 November 1945
- 349th Military Airlift Wing (later 349th Airlift Wing), 1 July 1973
- 349th Operations Group, 1 August 1992 – 1 January 1998

=== Stations ===
- Ephrata Army Air Base, Washington, 1 May 1943
- Rapid City Army Air Base, South Dakota, 13 June 1943
- Harvard Army Air Field, Nebraska, 1 August 1943 – 11 November 1943
- RAF Rattlesden (AAF-126), England, 1 December 1943-c. 1 August 1945
- Drew Field, Florida, 14 August-7 November 1945
- Travis Air Force Base, California, 1 July 1973 – 15 November 1997

=== Aircraft ===
- Boeing B-17 Flying Fortress, 1943–1945
- Lockheed C-141 Starlifter, 1973–1997

=== Awards and campaigns ===
Award streamer	Award	Dates	Notes
	Air Force Outstanding Unit Award	1 July 1974-30 June 1975	710th Military Airlift Squadron
	Air Force Outstanding Unit Award	1 July 1975-30 June 1977	710th Military Airlift Squadron
	Air Force Outstanding Unit Award	1 July 1992-30 June 1994	710th Airlift Squadron
	Air Force Outstanding Unit Award	1 July 1994-15 August 1996	710th Airlift Squadron

Campaign Streamer	Campaign	Dates	Notes
	American Theater	1 May 1943 – 11 November 1943	710th Bombardment Squadron
	Air Offensive, Europe	29 November 1943 – 5 June 1944	710th Bombardment Squadron
	Normandy	6 June 1944 – 24 July 1944	710th Bombardment Squadron
	Northern France	25 July 1944 – 14 September 1944	710th Bombardment Squadron
	Rhineland	15 September 1944 – 21 March 1945	710th Bombardment Squadron
	Ardennes-Alsace	16 December 1944 – 25 January 1945	710th Bombardment Squadron
	Central Europe	22 March 1944 – 21 May 1945	710th Bombardment Squadron
