= 709th Airlift Squadron =

709th Airlift Squadron

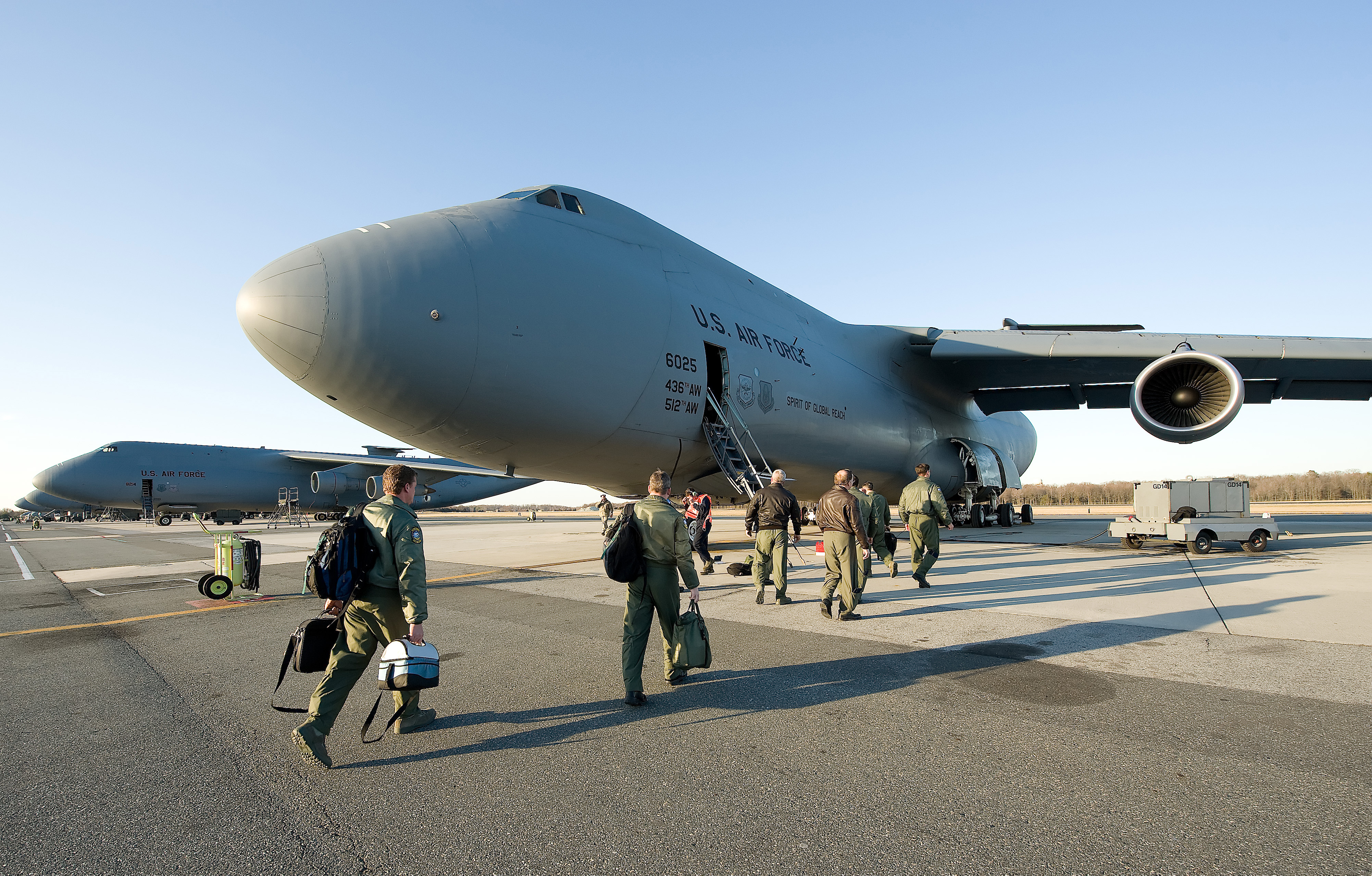
- A crew from the 709th prepares for a training flight on the first C-5M at Dover Air Force Base (Note: Aircraft is Lockheed C-5M-LO Super Galaxy, Spirit of Global Reach.)
- Active: 1943–1945; 1947–1949; 1973–present
- Country: United States
- Branch: United States Air Force
- Role: Airlift
- Part of: Air Force Reserve Command
- Garrison/HQ: Dover Air Force Base, Delaware
- Motto: Global Airlift
- Colors: White (World War II)
- Engagements: European Theater of Operations; Operation Just Cause
- Decorations: Air Force Outstanding Unit Award

Insignia
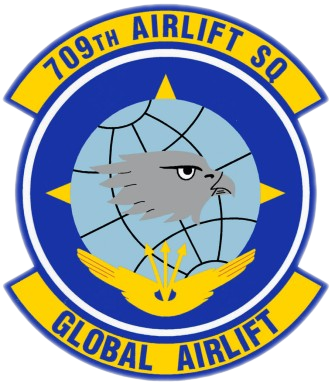
- 709th Airlift Squadron emblem (Note: Approved 29 September 1980.)

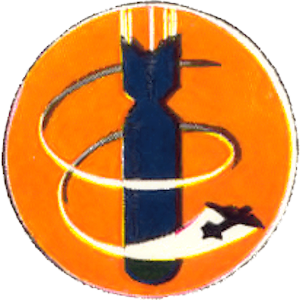
- 709th Bombardment Squadron emblem (Note: Approved 6 September 1943. Description: On an orange disc, bordure white, edged black, a large black aerial bomb, palewise, point to base, enclosed in spiral white reversed light gray, trailing as wake behind black four-motor silhouette aircraft in sinister base.)
- ETO Fuselage Code: IE
- 447th Bombardment Group tail marking: Square K

The 709th Airlift Squadron is part of the 512th Airlift Wing at Dover Air Force Base, Delaware.

The squadron was first activated during World War II as the 709th Bombardment Squadron. After training in the United States, it deployed to the European Theater, where it engaged in the strategic bombing campaign against Germany. After V-E Day, it returned to the United States, where it was inactivated in the fall of 1945.

The squadron was briefly activated in the reserves from 1947 to 1949. In 1973, the squadron was redesignated the 709th Military Airlift Squadron and activated at Dover as a reserve associate unit of the 436th Military Airlift Wing. Its reservists operated the 436th's C-5s alongside members of the regular Air Force.

== Mission ==
Since 1973 the squadron has trained for and flown airlift missions with the Lockheed C-5 Galaxy, It also participates in military exercises and global humanitarian and contingency operations.

== History ==
=== World War II ===
==== Training in the United States ====
The squadron was first activated on 1 May 1943 at Ephrata Army Air Base, Washington as the 709th Bombardment Squadron, one of the four squadrons of the 447th Bombardment Group.

The original mission of the squadron was to be an Operational Training Unit. However, by the time the 447th Group reached full strength in October it had been identified for overseas deployment and its key personnel were sent to the Army Air Forces School of Applied Tactics at Orlando Army Air Base, Florida for advanced tactical training. The cadre trained at Brooksville Army Air Field with the 1st Bombardment Squadron, engaging in simulated attacks against Mobile, Alabama, Charleston, South Carolina and New Orleans. The squadron then trained at Rapid City Army Air Base, South Dakota with the 17th Bombardment Training Wing. In June 1943 the group moved to Harvard Army Air Field, Nebraska for Phase I training. The unit sailed on the RMS Queen Elizabeth on 23 November 1943 and arrived at the Firth of Clyde on 29 November 1943. The squadron's B-17s began to move from the United States to the European theater of operations in November 1943.

==== Combat in the European Theater ====
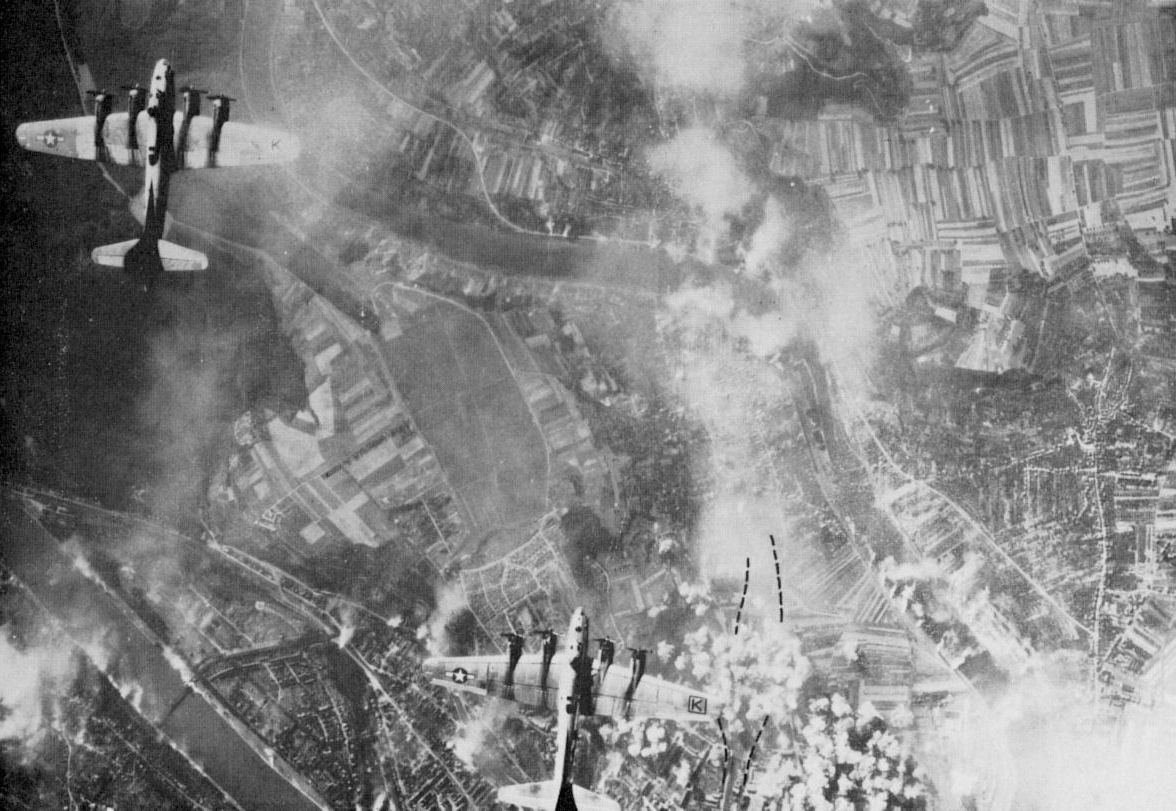
B-17s of the 447th Bombardment Group attacking Koblenz 19 September 1944

The squadron was stationed at RAF Rattlesden, England, from December 1943 to August 1945. It flew its first combat mission on 24 December 1943 against a V-1 flying bomb launch site near Saint-Omer in Northern France.

From December 1943 to May 1944, the squadron helped prepare for the invasion of the European continent by attacking submarine pens, naval installations, and cities in Germany; missile sites and ports in France; and airfields and marshaling yards in France, Belgium and Germany. The squadron conducted heavy bombardment missions against German aircraft industry during Big Week, 20 to 25 February 1944.

The unit supported Operation Overlord, the invasion of Normandy in June 1944 by bombing airfields and other targets. On D-Day the squadron bombed the beachhead area using pathfinder aircraft.

The squadron aided in Operation Cobra, the breakthrough at Saint Lo, France, and the effort to take Brest, France, from July to September 1944. It bombed strategic targets from October to December 1944, concentrating on sources of oil production. It assaulted marshalling yards, railroad bridges and communication centers during the Battle of the Bulge from December 1944 to January 1945. In March 1945 the group bombed an airfield in support of Operation Varsity, the airborne assault across the Rhine. The unit flew its last combat mission on 21 April 1945 against a marshalling yard at Ingolstadt, Germany.

The 709th redeployed to the United States during the summer 1945. The air echelon ferried their aircraft and personnel back to the United States, leaving on 29 and 30 June 1945. The squadron ground echelon, along with the 711th squadron sailed 3 August 1945 on the SS Benjamin R. Milam, from Liverpool. Most personnel were discharged at Camp Myles Standish after arrival at the port of Boston. A small cadre proceeded to Drew Field, Florida and the squadron inactivated on 7 November 1945.

=== Pre-Korean War reserve operations ===
Two years later, on 25 July 1947, the 709th was redesignated the 709th Bombardment Squadron, Very Heavy. It was activated under Air Defense Command (ADC) in the reserves on 10 November 1947, at Bergstrom Field Texas, although it does not appear that the squadron was fully manned or equipped with tactical aircraft. In July 1948, Continental Air Command (ConAC) assumed reserve training responsibility from ADC. President Truman's reduced 1949 defense budget required reductions in the number of units in the Air Force. As a result, the squadron was inactivated in June 1949 when its parent group moved to Castle Air Force Base, California and became a corollary unit of the 93d Bombardment Group.

=== Reserve associate operations ===
The squadron was redesignated the 709th Military Airlift Squadron and activated as a Military Airlift Command reserve associate C-5 Galaxy squadron in 1973 and was associated with the 436th Military Airlift Wing. The associate program meshes active-duty and reserve units using the active-duty host aircraft and equipment for training.

Since 1973 the 709th has trained for and flown airlift missions, participating in exercises and global humanitarian and contingency operations.

In December 1989 through January 1990, the 709th participated in Operation Just Cause, which removed Manuel Noriega from power in Panama. Later that year, the squadron was called to active duty to support Operations Desert Shield and Desert Storm. In 2004 and 2005 reserve crews from Dover supported humanitarian relief operations following the tsunami in Indonesia and Hurricane Katrina.

== Lineage ==
- Constituted as the 709th Bombardment Squadron (Heavy) on 6 April 1943

Activated on 1 May 1943
Redesignated 709th Bombardment Squadron, Heavy on 20 August 1943
Inactivated on 7 November 1945
Redesignated 709th Bombardment Squadron, Very Heavy on 24 October 1947
Activated in the reserve on 10 November 1947
Inactivated on 27 June 1949

- Redesignated 709 Military Airlift Squadron (Associate) on 19 June 1973

Activated in the Reserve on 1 October 1973
Redesignated 709th Airlift Squadron (Associate) on 1 February 1992
Redesignated 709th Airlift Squadron on 1 October 1994

=== Assignments ===
- 447th Bombardment Group, 1 May 1943 – 7 November 1945
- 447th Bombardment Group, 10 November 1947 – 27 June 1949
- 512th Military Airlift Wing (later 512 Airlift Wing), 1 October 1973
- 512th Operations Group, 1 August 1992 – present

=== Stations ===
- Ephrata Army Air Base, Washington, 1 May 1943
- Rapid City Army Air Base, South Dakota, 13 June 1943
- Harvard Army Airfield, Nebraska, 1 August 1943 – 11 November 1943
- RAF Rattlesden (AAF-126), England, 1 December 1943 – c. 3 August 1945
- Drew Field, Florida, 18 August 1945 – 7 November 1945
- Bergstrom Field (later Bergstrom Air Force Base), Texas, 10 November 1947 – 27 June 1949
- Dover Air Force Base, Delaware, 1 October 1973 – present

=== Aircraft ===
- Boeing B-17 Flying Fortress, 1943–1945
- Lockheed C-5 Galaxy, 1973–present

=== Awards and campaigns ===
Award streamer	Award	Dates	Notes
	Air Force Outstanding Unit Award	13 October 1973 – 14 November 1973	709th Military Airlift Squadron
	Air Force Outstanding Unit Award	1 January 1974 – 30 April 1975	709th Military Airlift Squadron
	Air Force Outstanding Unit Award	1 May 1975 – 31 May 1976	709th Military Airlift Squadron
	Air Force Outstanding Unit Award	1 June 1976 – 31 May 1978	709th Military Airlift Squadron
	Air Force Outstanding Unit Award	1 June 1978 – 31 May 1979	709th Military Airlift Squadron
	Air Force Outstanding Unit Award	1 January 1988 – 30 June 1989	709th Military Airlift Squadron
	Air Force Outstanding Unit Award	1 July 1993 – 30 June 1995	709th Airlift Squadron
	Air Force Outstanding Unit Award	1 September 1996 – 31 August 1998	709th Airlift Squadron

Campaign Streamer	Campaign	Dates	Notes
	American Theater	1 May 1943 – 11 November 1943	709th Bombardment Squadron
	Air Offensive, Europe	29 November 1943 – 5 June 1944	709th Bombardment Squadron
	Normandy	6 June 1944 – 24 July 1944	709th Bombardment Squadron
	Northern France	25 July 1944 – 14 September 1944	709th Bombardment Squadron
	Rhineland	15 September 1944 – 21 March 1945	709th Bombardment Squadron
	Ardennes-Alsace	16 December 1944 – 25 January 1945	709th Bombardment Squadron
	Central Europe	22 March 1944 – 21 May 1945	709th Bombardment Squadron
	Just Cause	20 December 1989 – 31 January 1990	709th Military Airlift Squadron, Panama

== See also ==
- List of Boeing B-17 Flying Fortress operators
