= 711th Special Operations Squadron =

711th Special Operations Squadron

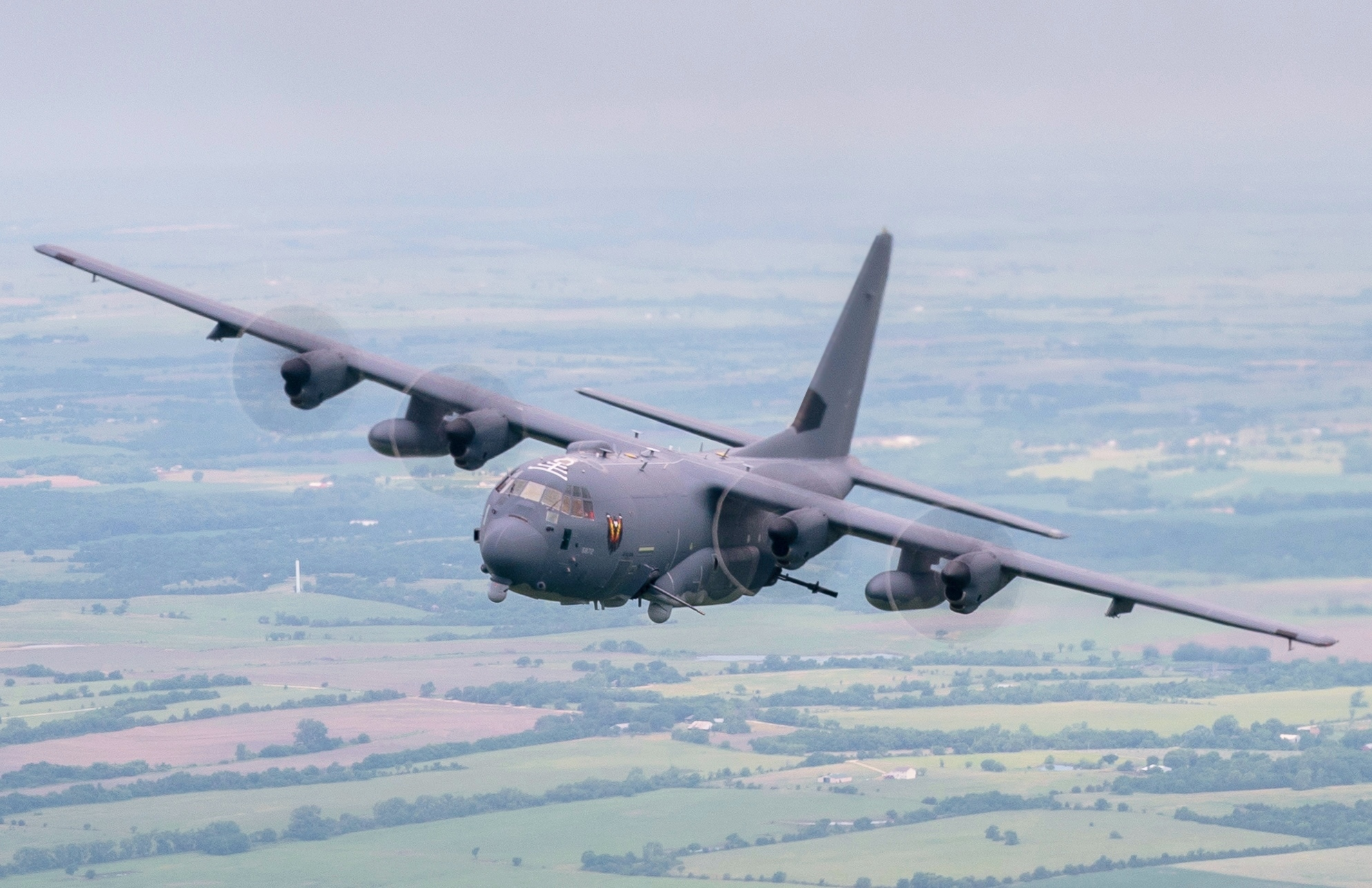
- AC-130J Ghostrider
- Active: 1943–1945; 1949–1951; 1955–1957; 1971–present
- Country: United States
- Branch: United States Air Force
- Role: Special operations, Close Air Support, Interdiction, Armed Reconnaissance
- Part of: Air Force Reserve Command
- Garrison/HQ: Hurlburt Field, Florida
- Colors: Blue (World War II) Brown (beret color, 2013-2022)
- Engagements: European Theater of Operations; Operation Just Cause; Operation Desert Storm
- Decorations: Gallant Unit Citation; Air Force Outstanding Unit Award with Combat "V" Device; Air Force Outstanding Unit Award

Commanders
- Notable commanders: Major General Richard S. Haddad

Insignia
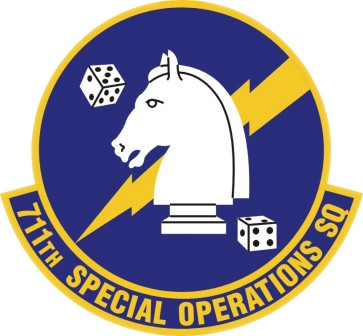
- 711th Special Operations Squadron Emblem (Note: Approved c. 1977)

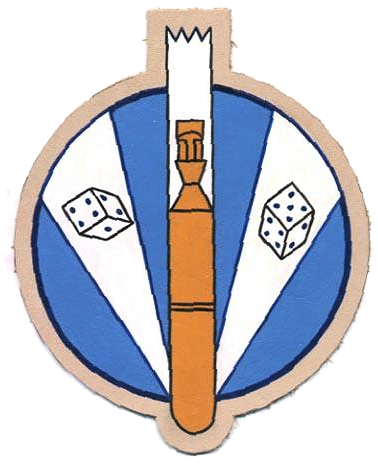
- 711th Bombardment Squadron emblem (Note: Approved 6 September 1943. Description: Over and through a light blue disc, outlined dark blue, a yellow orange aerial bomb on white speed segment, piercing lower rim of disc, and deflecting a pair of dice to top and bottom of disc on white impact rays, dark blue spots 6, 5, and 4, showing on upper die and 1, 2, and 3, on lower die, with the spots 5 and 2 on the top of the dice.)
- World War II fuselage code: IP
- 447th Bombardment Group tail marking: Square K
- Combat Aviation Advisor Beret with Combat Aviation Advisor Beret Flash (2018-2022)

The 711th Special Operations Squadron is an active reserve squadron of the United States Air Force, part of the 919th Special Operations Wing and stationed at Hurlburt Field, Florida. The unit is operationally gained by Air Force Special Operations Command if called to active duty. As of February 2025 the squadron is being stood up to operate the Lockheed AC-130J Ghostrider from Hurlburt Field, Florida.

The squadron was first activated during World War II as the 711th Bombardment Squadron. After training in the United States, it deployed to the European Theatre of Operations, where it engaged in the strategic bombing campaign against Germany. 2d Lieutenant Robert E. Femoyer, of the 711th Bombardment Squadron, was awarded the Medal of Honor for his heroic actions during a mission over Merseburg, Germany, on 2 November 1944. The squadron returned to the United States following the war and was inactivated.

The squadron was activated in the reserves as a light bomber unit in 1949 and served until it was called to active duty in 1951 as a result of the Korean War and its personnel used as fillers for other units. In 1955, the squadron was again activated in the reserves as the 711th Fighter-Bomber Squadron. It trained with Lockheed F-80 Shooting Stars and North American F-86 Sabres until being replaced by the 69th Troop Carrier Squadron in 1957.

The squadron activated in 1971 as the 711th Tactical Airlift Squadron at Duke Field, Florida with the mission of intratheater airlift, using Lockheed C-130 Hercules Aircraft. Three years later, it converted to the AC-130 gunship model of the Hercules and became the 711th Special Operations Squadron. In 1995 it converted to a third type of C-130 when it began to fly the MC-130 Combat Talon model. In 2013 it re-equipped with PZL C-145A Skytrucks and its mission became one of providing training and support for friendly nations. The Squadron was inactive between 2022 and 2025 after the retirement of the MC-145. In February 2025 the air force announced the squadron would begin operating the AC-130J out of Hurlburt Field, Florida.

== History ==
=== World War II ===
==== Training in the United States ====
The squadron was first activated on 1 May 1943 at Ephrata Army Air Base, Washington as the 711th Bombardment Squadron, one of the four squadrons of the 447th Bombardment Group.

The original mission of the squadron was to be an Operational Training Unit. However, by the time the 447th group reached full strength in October it had been identified for overseas deployment and its key personnel were sent to the Army Air Forces School of Applied Tactics at Orlando Army Air Base, Florida for advanced tactical training. The cadre trained at Brooksville Army Air Field with the 1st Bombardment Squadron, engaging in simulated attacks against Mobile, Alabama, Charleston, South Carolina and New Orleans. The squadron then trained at Rapid City Army Air Base, South Dakota with the 17th Bombardment Training Wing. In June 1943 the group moved to Harvard Army Air Field, Nebraska for Phase I training. The unit sailed on the RMS Queen Elizabeth on 23 November 1943 and arrived at the Firth of Clyde on 29 November 1943. The squadron's B-17s began to move from the United States to the European theater of operations in November 1943.

==== Combat in the European Theater ====
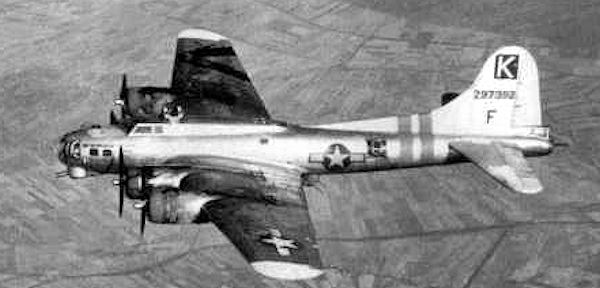
Squadron B-17G Flying Fortress (Note: Aircraft is Boeing B-17G-45-BO Flying Fortress, serial 42-97392, Ramblin' Wreck. This plane survived the war and was sent to storage at Kingman AAF, AZ on 20 December 1945. It was sold for scrap in July 1946. Baugher, Joe (6 May 2023). "1942 USAF Serial Numbers". Joe Baugher.)

The squadron was stationed at RAF Rattlesden, England, from December 1943 to August 1945. It flew its first combat mission on 24 December 1943 against a V-1 flying bomb launch site near Saint-Omer in Northern France.

From December 1943 to May 1944, the squadron helped prepare for the invasion of the European continent by attacking submarine pens, naval installations, and cities in Germany; missile sites and ports in France; and airfields and marshaling yards in France, Belgium and Germany. The squadron conducted heavy bombardment missions against German aircraft industry during Big Week, 20 to 25 February 1944.

The unit supported Operation Overlord, the invasion of Normandy in June 1944 by bombing airfields and other targets. On D-Day the squadron bombed the beachhead area using pathfinder aircraft.

The squadron aided in Operation Cobra, the breakthrough at Saint Lo, France, and the effort to take Brest, France, from July to September 1944. It bombed strategic targets from October to December 1944, concentrating on sources of oil production. It assaulted marshalling yards, railroad bridges and communication centers during the Battle of the Bulge from December 1944 to January 1945. In March 1945 the group bombed an airfield in support of Operation Varsity, the airborne assault across the Rhine. The unit flew its last combat mission on 21 April 1945 against a marshalling yard at Ingolstadt, Germany.

On 2 November 1944, 2d Lieutenant Robert E. Femoyer, a navigator with the squadron, was flying a mission to Merseburg, Germany. His B-17 was damaged by flak and Lt. Femoyer was severely injured in his back and side. He refused morphine to relieve the pain of his injuries in order to keep his mind alert to navigate the plane out of the danger from heavily defended flak areas and then to a place of safety for his crew. Because he was too weak to climb back in his seat, he asked other crew members to prop him up so he could read his charts and instruments. For more than two hours he directed the navigation of his plane back to its home station with no further damage. Shortly after being removed from his plane, Lt. Femoyer died of his injuries.

The 711th redeployed to the United States during the summer 1945. The air echelon ferried their aircraft and personnel back to the United States, leaving on 29 and 30 June 1945. The squadron ground echelon, along with the 709th squadron sailed 3 August 1945 on the SS Benjamin R. Milam, from Liverpool. Most personnel were discharged at Camp Myles Standish after arrival at the port of Boston. A small cadre proceeded to Drew Field, Florida and the squadron inactivated on 7 November 1945.

=== Pre-Korean War reserve operations ===
The squadron was redesignated as a light bomber unit and activated in the reserve at Long Beach Municipal Airport, when the 448th Bombardment Group was authorized a fourth squadron. However, the unit was only authorized manning of 25% of normal strength. It had no tactical aircraft assigned, but flew twin engine trainers under the supervision of the 2347th Air Force Reserve Training Center. In August 1950, the 448th Bombardment Wing's companion reserve unit at Long Beach, the 452d Bombardment Wing, was mobilized for Korean War service. In order to bring the 452d Wing to combat strength, skilled reservists and reservists who required 60 or fewer days training to qualify them as fully skilled assigned to the 448th Wing were transferred to the 452d Wing. The 711th Squadron itself was called to active duty in the second wave of mobilization in March 1951 and its personnel who had not been transferred to the 452d Wing were used as fillers for other Air Force organizations, while the squadron was inactivated a few days later.

=== Reserve fighter operations ===
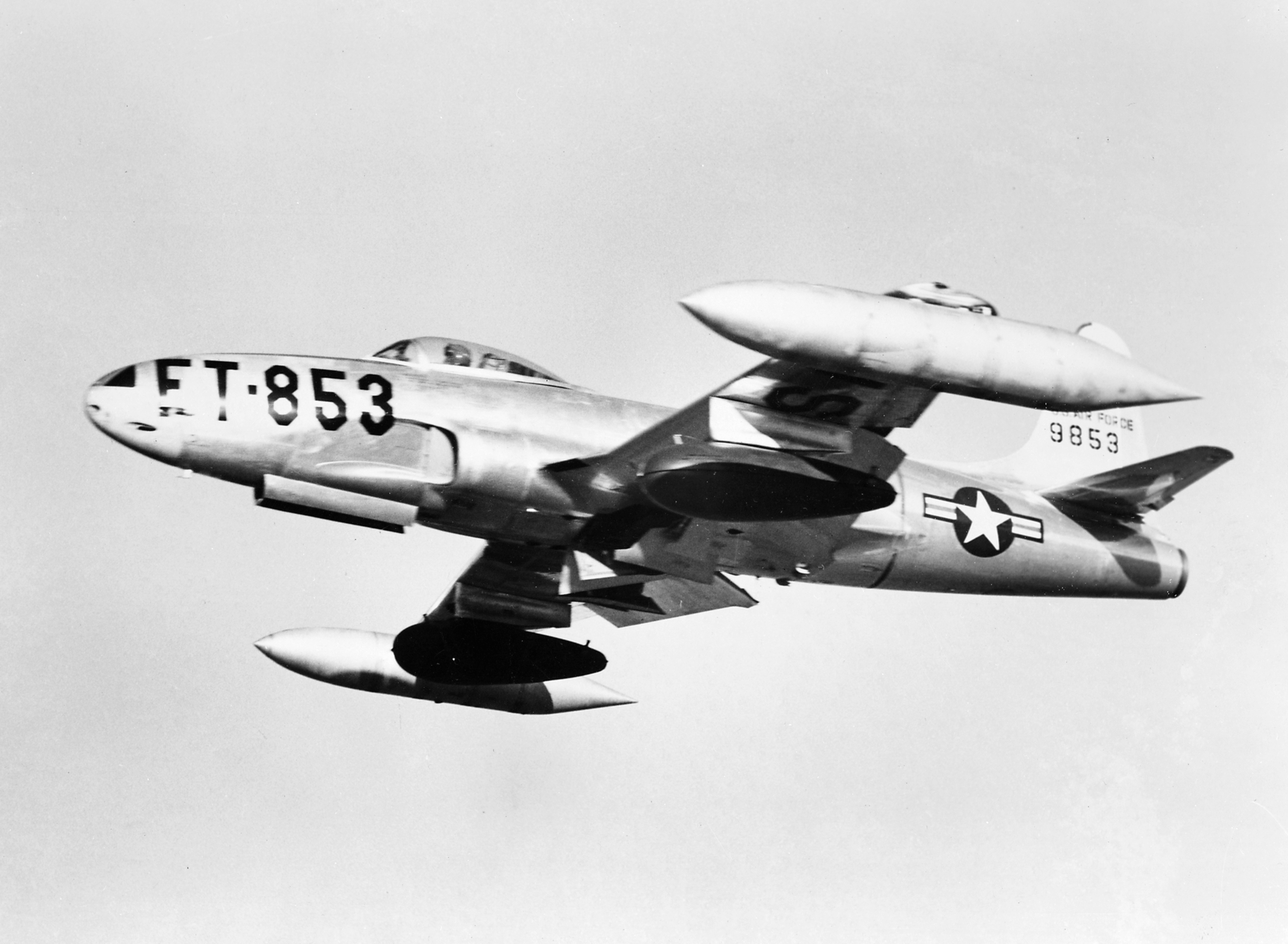
F-80C as flown by the squadron

The reserve mobilization for the Korean War left it without aircraft, and the reserve did not again receive aircraft until July 1952. When aircraft were assigned, six reserve pilot training wings were activated. However, the Air Force desired that all reserve units be designed to augment the regular forces in the event of a national emergency. Because the pilot training wings had no mobilization mission they were discontinued on 18 May 1955, and replaced by fighter-bomber and troop carrier wings. The squadron was redesignated the 711th Fighter-Bomber Squadron and again activated as a reserve unit at Hensley Field, Texas when the 448th Fighter-Bomber Wing replaced the 8709th Pilot Training Wing. The squadron took over the North American T-28 Trojan aircraft of the 8709th, but soon re-equipped with Lockheed F-80 Shooting Stars.

Despite its fighter bomber designation, the squadron was gained by Air Defense Command (ADC) upon mobilization. ADC required the squadron be designed to augment active duty squadrons capable of performing air defense missions for an indefinite period after mobilization independently of its parent wing. The squadron flew the F-80 until 1957, when it began converting to the North American F-86 Sabre.

However, the Joint Chiefs of Staff were pressuring the Air Force to provide more wartime airlift. At the same time, about 150 Fairchild C-119 Flying Boxcars became available from the active force. Consequently, in November 1956 the Air Force directed Continental Air Command to convert three reserve fighter bomber wings to the troop carrier mission by September 1957. In addition, within the Air Staff was a recommendation that the reserve fighter mission given to the Air National Guard and replaced by the troop carrier mission. As a consequence in November 1957, the 711th and the remainder of the 448th Wing were inactivated when reserve operations at Hensley converted to the airlift mission and the 69th Troop Carrier Squadron moved to Hensley from Tinker Air Force Base, Oklahoma.

=== Reserve special operations ===
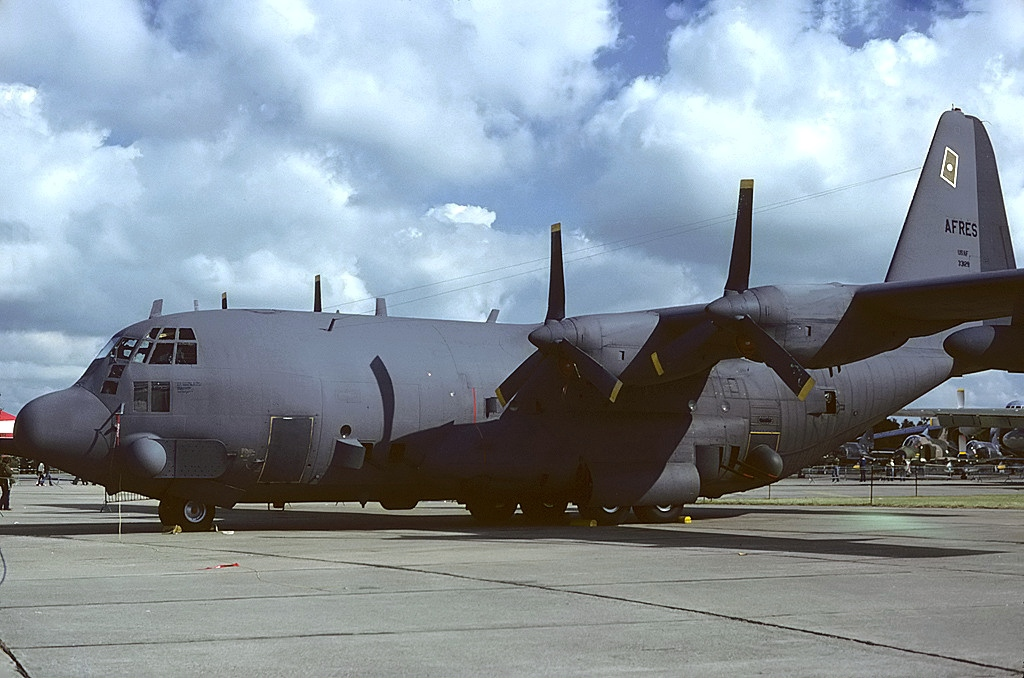
711th AC-130A Spectre (Note: Aircraft is Lockheed AC-130A-LM, serial 53-3129. First Lady. This aircraft was built as a C-130A Hercules. It was converted to JC-130A configuration in September 1959 and to AC-130A Spectre on 2 December 1968. It is now on display at Eglin AFB. It is the first Hercules built. Baugher, Joe (8 April 2023). "1953 USAF Serial Numbers". Joe Baugher.)

The unit reactivated in 1971 at Duke Field, Florida as the 711th Tactical Airlift Squadron, a reserve intratheater airlift squadron equipped with the Lockheed C-130A Hercules. Its mission was the airlift of personnel and cargo as well as airdrop support for Army paratroopers during exercises.

In late 1974, the squadron began transitioning to the AC-130A Spectre aircraft and when transition to gunships was complete the squadron was redesignated as the 711th Special Operations Squadron in the summer of the following year. Close air support of conventional and special operations ground forces became the unit's primary duty, but additional capabilities included the ability to perform armed interdiction, reconnaissance, and escort, forward air control and combat search and rescue in conventional or unconventional warfare settings.

Because the Spectres' advanced sensors were useful in range reconnaissance and range clearing tasks, the 711th also provided missile range support to the Air Force's Eastern Range at Cape Canaveral Air Force Station from 1979 to 1989 and Space Shuttle support to National Aeronautics and Space Administration at Kennedy Space Center from 1981 to 1988.

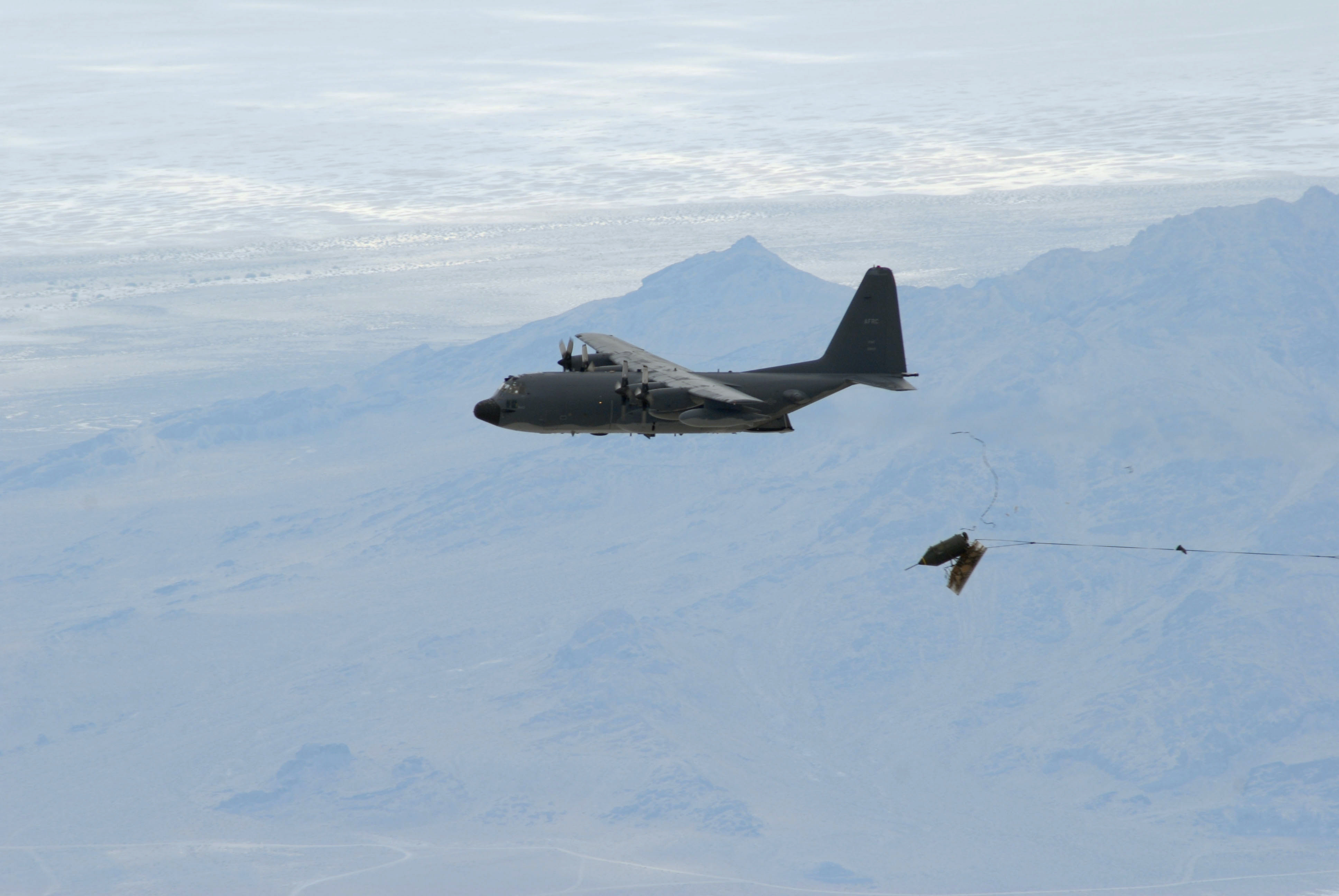
A squadron MC-130E drops the last BLU-82 (Note: The drop of the 15,000 pounds (6,800 kg) bomb was made at the Utah Test and Training Range on 15 July 2008.)

The 711th flew pre-strike reconnaissance, fire support, escort, and air base defense sorties during Operation Just Cause, the United States intervention in Panama from 8 December 1989 to 7 January 1990, for which it earned an Air Force Outstanding Unit Award.

The 711th again flew combat missions during Operation Desert Storm in Southwest Asia from February through March 1991. The squadron deployed five aircraft and eight aircrews to King Fahd International Airport, near Dhahran, Saudi Arabia, arriving on 7 February and flying its first sortie two days later. On 26 February three of the squadron's AC-130As attacked the Jahra to Basra road, which was being used by fleeing Iraqi troops. Fighter aircraft had struck the road, and numerous vehicles were backed up on the road, struggling to make their way north. Ghost 10 was the first squadron aircraft to attack, but it had to depart the area after destroying five vehicles due to its low fuel situation. It was replaced by Ghost 06 and Ghost 07, which destroyed an additional 29 vehicles, including four armored personnel carriers. The squadron flew 59 sorties during the war, and performed airlift as well as gunship missions. It departed the theater on 12 March and arrived at Duke on 19 March.

The squadron's primary mission changed in late 1995 as the unit transitioned to the MC-130E Combat Talon I aircraft. In its new role, the squadron provided long-range clandestine delivery of special operations forces and equipment. It periodically deployed personnel and aircraft to support special operations contingency operations worldwide, as well as numerous humanitarian missions. Beginning on 1 October 1997, the 711th also provided the flight portion of MC-130E Combat Talon I training for both Air Force Special Operations Command and Air Force Reserve Command.

After September 2001, the 711th frequently deployed aircraft and personnel to Iraq and Afghanistan in support of Operation Iraqi Freedom and Operation Enduring Freedom.

The squadron ended forty-two years of operating with the Hercules in 2013, when it transitioned into the PZL C-145 Skytruck short takeoff and landing aircraft. The unit's new mission is aviation foreign internal defense. Aviation foreign internal defense is a special operations forces mission employing airmen as combat aviation advisors to assess, train, advise and assist foreign nations in aviation. It supports friendly nations to assist the United States in achieving strategic political and military goals. In this mission, the squadron is a reserve associate unit operating and maintaining aircraft of the 6th Special Operations Squadron a colocated regular unit.

In 2015, the 711th SOS shares a building, flightline, aircraft and mission with the active-duty 6th Special Operations Squadron at Duke Field. The 6th moved from Hurlburt Field to Duke Field in 2012, as the 711th transitioned from the MC-130E to the foreign internal defense role, the two units jointly assuming the new mission. "As the only two Air Force operational squadrons performing this mission, their deployment tempo is best described as continuous averaging around one deployment a month."

On 15 December 2022, the squadron retired the C-145A from active service. According to two 2022 articles in Task & Purpose, the 711th was programmed to be inactivated. However the 711th was still shown on the 919th Special Operations Wing's af.mil website at the time as an active squadron.

On 28 February 2025 the Air Force announced the 711th would be stationed at Hurlburt Field and operate the Lockheed AC-130J Ghostrider.

== Lineage ==
- Constituted as the 711th Bombardment Squadron (Heavy) on 6 April 1943

Activated on 1 May 1943
Redesignated 711th Bombardment Squadron, Heavy on 20 August 1943
Inactivated on 7 November 1945

- Redesignated 711th Bombardment Squadron, Light on 10 May 1949

Activated in the reserve on 27 June 1949
Ordered to active service on 17 March 1951
Inactivated on 21 March 1951

- Redesignated 711th Fighter-Bomber Squadron on 12 April 1955

Activated in the reserve on 18 May 1955
Inactivated on 16 November 1957.

- Redesignated 711 Tactical Airlift Squadron on 17 June 1971

Activated in the Reserve on 30 July 1971
Redesignated 711 Special Operations Squadron on 1 July 1975

=== Assignments ===
- 447th Bombardment Group, 1 May 1943 – 7 November 1945
- 448th Bombardment Group, 27 June 1949 – 21 March 1951
- 448th Fighter-Bomber Group, 18 May 1955 – 16 November 1957
- 919th Tactical Airlift Group (later 919 Special Operations Group), 30 July 1971
- 919th Operations Group (later 919th Special Operations Group), (Note: This 919th Special Operations Group is not the same unit that the squadron was assigned to from 1971 to 1993. That unit is now the 919th Special Operations Wing. Robertson, Factsheet 919 Special Operations Wing (AFRC).) 1 August 1992 – present

=== Stations ===
- Ephrata Army Air Base, Washington, 1 May 1943
- Rapid City Army Air Base, South Dakota, 13 June 1943
- Harvard Army Air Field, Nebraska, 1 August-11 November 1943
- RAF Rattlesden (AAF-126), England, 1 December 1943-c. 1 August 1945
- Drew Field, Florida, 14 August-7 November 1945
- Long Beach Municipal Airport, California, 27 June 1949 – 21 March 1951
- Naval Air Station Dallas / Hensley Field, Texas, 18 May 1955 – 16 November 1957
- Duke Field (Eglin Air Force Base Auxiliary Field No. 3), Florida, 30 June 1971 – 2025
- Hurlburt Field, Florida, 2025–present

=== Aircraft ===
- Boeing B-17G Flying Fortress, 1943–1945
- Beechcraft AT-7 Navigator, 1949–1951
- Beechcraft AT-11 Kansan, 1949–1951
- North American T-28 Trojan 1955
- Lockheed F-80 Shooting Star, 1955–1957
- Lockheed T-33A Shooting Star, 1955–1957
- North American F-86 Sabre, 1957-1957
- Lockheed C-130A Hercules, 1971–1975
- Lockheed AC-130A Spectre, 1975–1995
- Lockheed MC-130E Combat Talon I, 1995–2013
- PZL C-145A Skytruck, 2013–2022
- Lockheed Martin AC-130J Ghostrider II, 2025-present

=== Awards and campaigns ===
Award streamer	Award	Dates	Notes
	Gallant Unit Citation	6 October 2001-1 July 2003	711th Special Operations Squadron
	Air Force Outstanding Unit Award with Combat "V" Device	1 February 2001–31 January 2003	711th Special Operations Squadron
	Air Force Outstanding Unit Award	30 July 1971-31 March 1973	711th Tactical Airlift Squadron
	Air Force Outstanding Unit Award	1 July 1975-31 January 1977	711th Special Operations Squadron
	Air Force Outstanding Unit Award	1 October 1983-1 June 1985	711th Special Operations Squadron
	Air Force Outstanding Unit Award	1 June 1987-31 May 1989	711th Special Operations Squadron
	Air Force Outstanding Unit Award	8 December 1989-7 January 1990	711th Special Operations Squadron
	Air Force Outstanding Unit Award	1 June 1990-31 May 1992	711th Special Operations Squadron
	Air Force Outstanding Unit Award	1 June 1992-31 May 1994	711th Special Operations Squadron
	Air Force Outstanding Unit Award	1 June 1994-31 May 1996	711th Special Operations Squadron
	Air Force Outstanding Unit Award	1 June 1996-31 May 1998	711th Special Operations Squadron
	Air Force Outstanding Unit Award	1 June 1998-31 May 2000	711th Special Operations Squadron
	Air Force Outstanding Unit Award	1 February 2003–30 September 2003	711th Special Operations Squadron
	Air Force Outstanding Unit Award	1 October 2003–31 December 2004	711th Special Operations Squadron
	Air Force Outstanding Unit Award	1 January 2005–31 December 2005	711th Special Operations Squadron
	Air Force Outstanding Unit Award	1 January 2006–31 December 2006	711th Special Operations Squadron
	Air Force Outstanding Unit Award	1 January 2007–30 April 2007	711th Special Operations Squadron
	Air Force Outstanding Unit Award	1 October 2008–30 July 2010	711th Special Operations Squadron

Campaign Streamer	Campaign	Dates	Notes
	American Theater	1 May 1943 – 11 November 1943	711th Bombardment Squadron
	Air Offensive, Europe	29 November 1943 – 5 June 1944	711th Bombardment Squadron
	Normandy	6 June 1944 – 24 July 1944	711th Bombardment Squadron
	Northern France	25 July 1944 – 14 September 1944	711th Bombardment Squadron
	Rhineland	15 September 1944 – 21 March 1945	711th Bombardment Squadron
	Ardennes-Alsace	16 December 1944 – 25 January 1945	711th Bombardment Squadron
	Central Europe	22 March 1944 – 21 May 1945	711th Bombardment Squadron
	Just Cause	20 December 1989 – 31 January 1990	711th Special Operations Squadron, Panama
	Defense of Saudi Arabia	(Note: The 711th received credit for this campaign. However unit histories show that the squadron did not deploy until the campaign ended. Dollman, Factsheet 711 Special Operations Squadron.)	711th Special Operations Squadron
	Liberation and Defense of Kuwait	9 February 1991 – 19 March 1991	711th Special Operations Squadron
	Air Campaign		711th Special Operations Squadron
	Consolidation II	1 November 2006 – 30 November 2006	711th Special Operations Squadron
	Transition of Iraq	2 May 2003 – 28 June 2004	711th Special Operations Squadron
	National Resolution	16 December 2005 – 9 January 2007	711th Special Operations Squadron
	Iraqi Sovereignty	1 January 2009 – 31 August 2010	711th Special Operations Squadron
	New Dawn	1 September 2010 – 31 December 2011	711th Special Operations Squadron
