= 447th Air Expeditionary Group =

447th Air Expeditionary Group

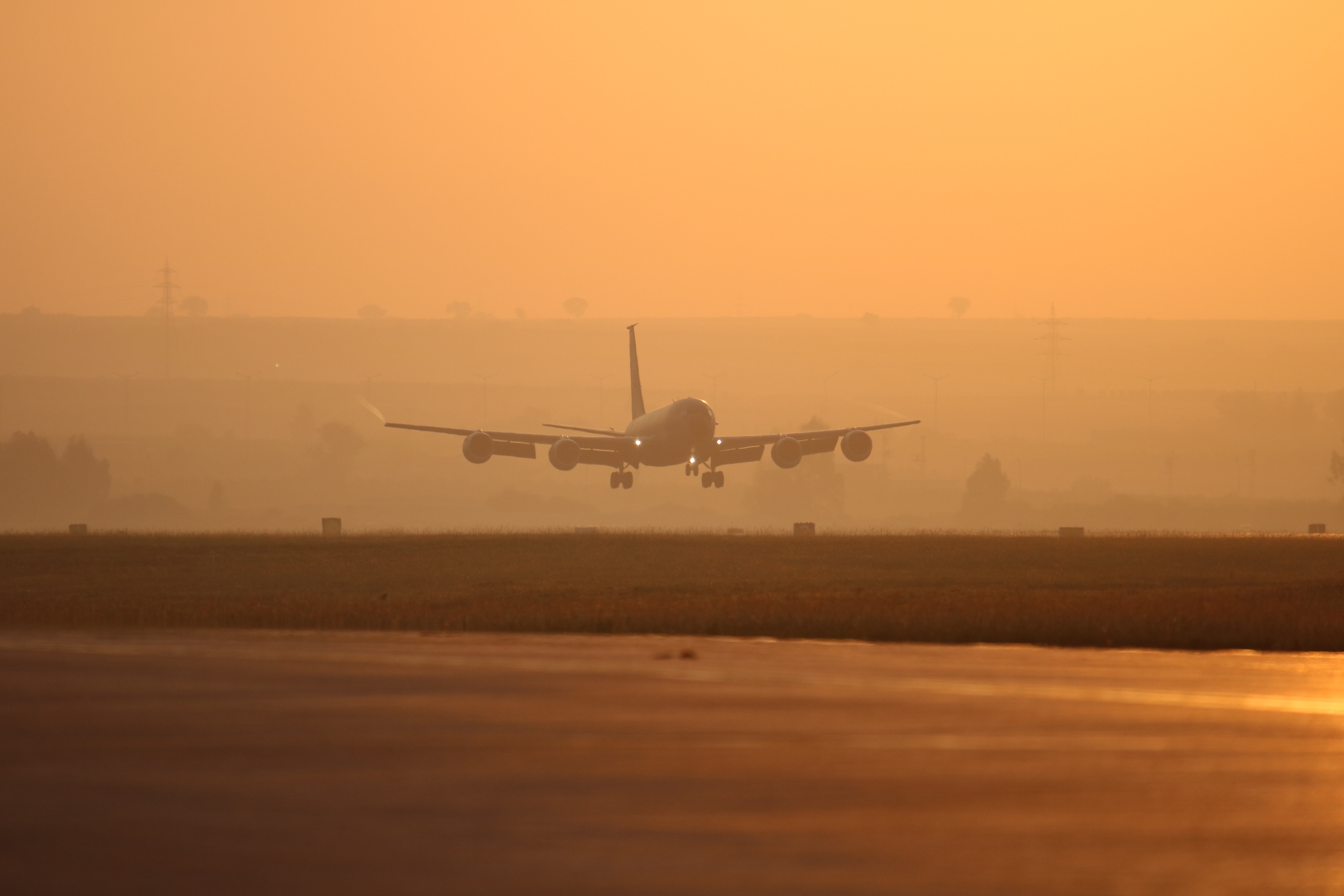
- A KC-135 lands at Incirlik Air Base on 2 July 2016.
- Active: 1943–1945; 1947–1951; 2003–c. 2011; 2015–present
- Country: United States
- Branch: United States Air Force
- Part of: United States Air Forces in Europe
- Garrison/HQ: Incirlik Air Base, Turkey
- Nickname: The Ramblers
- Motto: Fiat justitia ruat coelum (Latin for 'Let Justice be Done Though the Heavens Fall')
- Engagements: European Theater of World War II Iraq Campaign
- Decorations: Air Force Meritorious Unit Award

Commanders
- Notable commanders: Hunter Harris, Jr.

Insignia
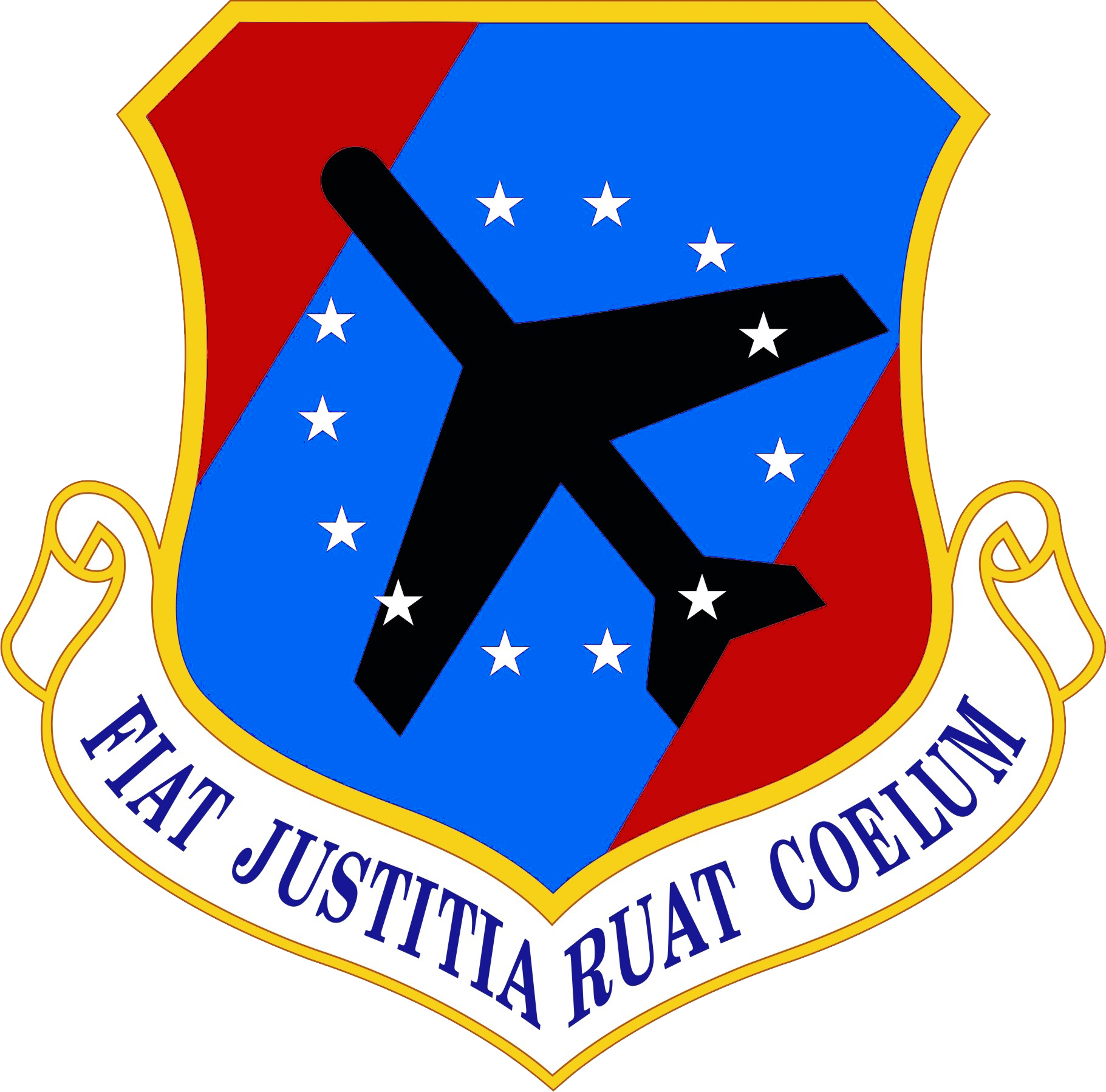
- 447th Air Expeditionary Group emblem

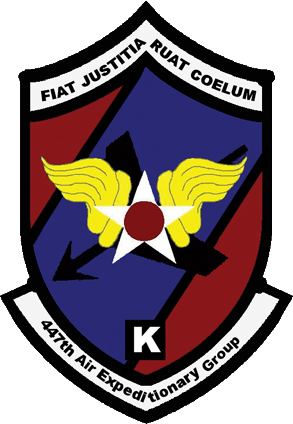
- 447th Air Expeditionary Group heritage emblem based on unofficial World War II emblem
- World War II Tail Marking: Square K

The 447th Air Expeditionary Group is a provisional United States Air Force unit assigned to the Air Combat Command and United States Air Forces Europe. The unit is currently stationed at Incirlik Air Base, Turkey in support of Operation Inherent Resolve.

The group was first active during World War II as the 447th Bombardment Group (Heavy). It participated in combat in the European Theater of Operations with B-17 Flying Fortress at RAF Rattlesden as part of Eighth Air Force. During Big Week, 20–25 February 1944, the 447th took part in the intensive campaign of heavy bombers against the German aircraft industry.

2d Lieutenant Robert E. Femoyer, of the 711th Bombardment Squadron, was awarded the Medal of Honor for his heroic actions during a mission over Merseburg, Germany, on 2 November 1944. The group returned to the United States following the war and was inactivated.

The group was activated again in 1947 in the Air Force Reserve. It moved to Castle Air Force Base, California in 1949, where it became a corollary unit of the active duty 93d Bombardment Group. It was called to active service in 1951 and was inactivated shortly thereafter while its members were used as fillers for other units.

In 2003, as the 447th Air Expeditionary Group, the unit was converted to provisional status and assigned to Air Combat Command to activate as needed. From April 2003 to December 2011, the group served at Sather Air Base, Iraq in support of Operation Iraqi Freedom and Operation New Dawn.

== History ==
=== World War II ===
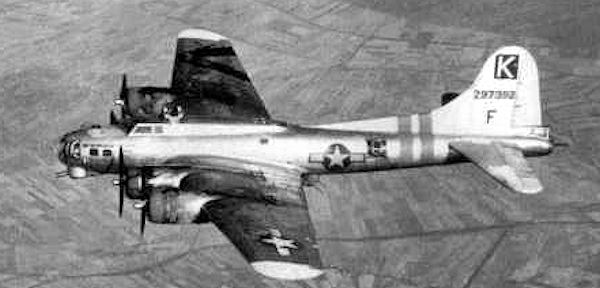
711th Bomb Squadron B-17G Flying Fprtress (Note: Aircraft is Boeing B-17G Flying Fortress, serial 42-97392, Ramblin Wreck (IR-F).)

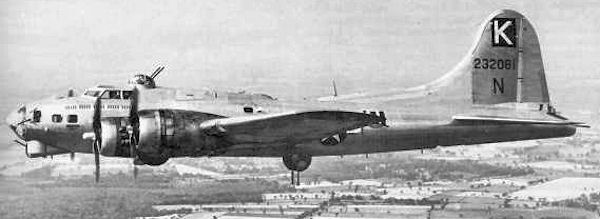
708th Bomb Squadron B-17G Flying Fortress (Note: Aircraft is Boeing B-17G Flying Fortress, serial 42–32081, Yellow Cab. It was hHit by flak and crashed into the North Sea killing all nine on board.)

==== Training in the United States ====
The group was first activated on 1 May 1943 at Ephrata Army Air Base, Washington as the 447th Bombardment Group. The group's original squadrons were the 708th, 709th, 710th and 711th Bombardment Squadrons.

The original mission of the 447th was to be an Operational Training Unit. However, by the time the group had reached full strength in October it had been identified for overseas deployment and its key personnel were assigned to the Army Air Forces School of Applied Tactics at Orlando Army Air Base, Florida for advanced tactical training. The cadre trained at Brooksville Army Air Field with the 1st Bombardment Squadron, engaging in simulated attacks against Mobile, Charleston and New Orleans. The squadron then trained at Rapid City Army Air Base, South Dakota with the 17th Bombardment Training Wing. In June 1943 the group moved to Harvard Army Air Field, Nebraska for Phase I training. The group lost three planes during training, two due to a mid-air collision in August 1943, and one to adverse weather in October.

The first 42 of the group's B-17s began to move from the United States to the European theater of operations in November 1943. The unit sailed on the RMS Queen Elizabeth on 23 November 1943 and arrived at the Firth of Clyde on 29 November 1943. The air echelon moved overseas via southern ferry route in early November 1943.

==== Combat in the European Theater ====
The group was stationed at RAF Rattlesden, England from 25 November 1943 to 1 August 1945. The group flew its first combat mission on 24 December 1943 against a V-1 missile site near Saint-Omer in northern France. Until May 1944 the 447th helped prepare for the invasion of the European continent by attacking submarine pens, naval installations, and cities in Germany; missile sites and ports in France; and airfields and marshaling yards in France, Belgium and Germany. The group conducted heavy bombardment missions against German aircraft industry during Big Week, 20 to 25 February 1944. The group lost 21 B-17s during April 1944. Only the 100th Bombardment Group lost more bombers in a single month. Heavy losses continued the following month. In an attack on Zwickau the composite wing in which the group was flying was attacked by over 200 Luftwaffe fighters, and the 447th lost seven Forts.

The group supported the invasion of Normandy in June 1944 by bombing airfields and other targets. On D-Day the group bombed the beachhead area using pathfinder aircraft.

The group aided in Operation Cobra, the breakthrough at St. Lo, France, and the effort to take Brest, France, from July to September 1944. It bombed strategic targets from October to December 1944, concentrating on sources of oil production. It assaulted marshalling yards, railroad bridges and communication centers during the Battle of the Bulge from December 1944 to January 1945. In March 1945 the group bombed an airfield in support of airborne assault across the Rhine.

On 2 November 1944, 2d Lieutenant Robert E. Femoyer, a navigator with the group, was flying a mission to Merseburg, Germany. His B-17 was damaged by flak and Lt. Femoyer was severely injured in his back and side. He refused morphine to relieve the pain of his injuries in order to keep his mind alert to navigate the plane out of the danger from heavily defended flak areas and then to a place of safety for his crew. Because he was too weak to climb back in his seat, he asked other crew members to prop him up so he could read his charts and instruments. For more than two hours he directed the navigation of his plane back to its home station with no further damage. Shortly after being removed from his plane, Lt. Femoyer died of his injuries.

The group flew its last combat mission on 21 April 1945 against a marshalling yard at Ingolstadt, Germany. Two days earlier, it lost a B-17 to an attack by a Messerschmitt Me 262 jet fighter. The six bombers lost by Eighth Air Force that day were its last losses of the war.

From 24 December 1943 to 21 April 1945 the group flew 258 combat missions; for a total of 8086 sorties, of which 6867 attacked their targets. Overall, the 447th dropped a total of 112,828 bombs, weighing 17,099 tons, on enemy targets during World War II. One of the group's planes, named Milk Wagon flew 129 missions without turning back, (Note: The crew of Milk Wagon marked missions by painting milk bottles on the aircraft nose, rather than the traditional bombs. Freeman, p. 232.) a record for the 3d Air Division.

The group redeployed to the United States during the summer 1945. The air echelon ferried their aircraft and personnel back to the United States, leaving on 29 and 30 June 1945. The group ground echelon, along with the 708th and 710th squadrons sailed on the SS Joseph T. Robinson on 1 August 1945, while the 709th and 711th squadrons departed on 3 August 1945 on the SS Benjamin R. Milam from Liverpool. Most personnel were discharged at Camp Myles Standish after arrival at the port of Boston. A small cadre proceeded to Drew Field, Florida and the group inactivated on 7 November 1945.

=== Reserves and Korean War ===
Two years later, on 25 July 1947, the 447th was redesignated the 447th Bombardment Group, Very Heavy. It was activated in the Air Force Reserve on 12 August 1947, at Bergstrom Field Texas, and equipped with Boeing B-29 Superfortresses. The group was redesignated as the 447th Bombardment Group, Medium when the B-29 was classified as a medium bomber and reassigned to Castle Air Force Base, California, where it became a corollary unit of the active duty 93d Bombardment Group. The 447th was ordered to active service in May 1951 as a result of the Korean War, with personnel and equipment reassigned to other units. It was inactivated as a "paper unit" on 16 June 1951.

=== Expeditionary service in Iraq ===
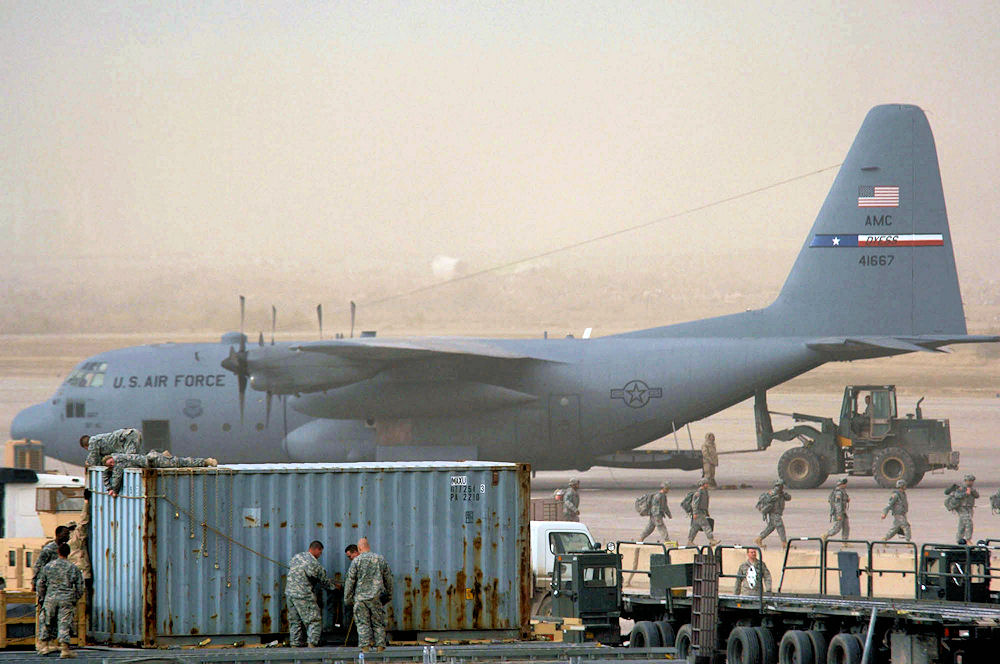
Lockheed C-130H Hercules 74-1667 of the 317th Airlift Group being unloaded despite a dust storm at Sather Air Base

The group was redesignated the 447th Air Expeditionary Group and converted to provisional status on 28 January 2003. The 447th was activated at Baghdad International Airport in April 2003, after elements of the 3rd Infantry Division captured the airport 4 April of the same year. The base was named Sather Air Base on 8 April 2005 in honor of Air Force Staff Sergeant Scott D. Sather, who was killed two years prior in combat during the 2003 invasion of Iraq. As of 2008, Sather was one of the busiest airports in Iraq, leading in number of passengers handled, and placing second in the amount of cargo.

The group provided aerial port, military runway control, aerial control, base operating support, combat airmen and combat medical support. The group also supported United States and Coalition forces with airlift, supplies and delivery of forces and materials within the Baghdad area. Air Force aerial port airmen worked next to United States Army soldiers. The airfield was a joint civilian-military airport, with a military ramp on the west side and a civilian runway and terminal on the other used for international civil flights.

=== Expeditionary service in Turkey ===
The 447th was reactivated in October 2015 at Incirlik Air Base with a complement of Fairchild Republic A-10C Thunderbolt IIs and Boeing KC-135R Stratotanker aerial refueling aircraft as part of Operation Inherent Resolve.when the Turkish government lifted its ban on Americans flying strike missions from Incirlik.

== Lineage ==
- Constituted as 447th Bombardment Group (Heavy) on 6 April 1943

Activated on 1 May 1943
Inactivated on 7 November 1945.

- Redesignated 447th Bombardment Group, Very Heavy and activated in the reserve on 12 August 1947

Redesignated 447th Bombardment Group, Medium on 27 June 1949
Ordered to active duty on 1 May 1951
Inactivated on 16 June 1951

- Redesignated 447th Air Expeditionary Group and converted to provisional status on 28 January 2003

Activated in April 2003
Inactivated c. 19 December 2011
Activated October 2015

=== Assignments ===
- II Bomber Command, 1 May 1943 (attached to 17th Bombardment Training Wing)
- Second Air Force, 6 October 1943 – 11 November 1943
- 4th Combat Bombardment Wing, 29 November 1943
- 14th Bombardment Wing, 18 June 1945 – 1 August 1945
- Third Air Force, 14 August 1945 – 7 November 1945
- 44th Bombardment Wing (later 44th Air Division), 12 August 1947
- Strategic Air Command, 27 June 1949 – 15 June 1951 (attached to 93d Bombardment Group until 10 February 1951, then to 93d Bombardment Wing)
- Air Combat Command to activate or inactivate at any time after 28 January 2003

332d Air Expeditionary Wing, April 2003 – April 2010
321st Air Expeditionary Wing, c. 28 April 2010 – c. 19 December 2011
332d Air Expeditionary Wing, September 2015 – present

=== Components ===
Bombardment Squadrons

- 708th Bombardment Squadron: 1 May 1943 – 7 November 1945; 12 August 1947 – 15 June 1951
- 709th Bombardment Squadron: 1 May 1943 – 7 November 1945; 10 November 1947 – 27 June 1949
- 710th Bombardment Squadron: 1 May 1943 – 7 November 1945
- 711th Bombardment Squadron: 1 May 1943 – 7 November 1945

Support Squadrons

- 447th Expeditionary Communications Squadron
- 447th Expeditionary Civil Engineering Squadron
- 447th Expeditionary Services Squadron (later Expeditionary Force Support Squadron)
- 447th Expeditionary Logistics Readiness Squadron
- 447th Expeditionary Medical Squadron
- 447th Expeditionary Operations Support Squadron
- 447th Expeditionary Security Forces Squadron (Note: The dates of squadron activations and inactivations, if different than the group, have not been publicly disclosed.)

=== Stations ===
- Ephrata Army Air Base, Washington, 1 May 1943
- Rapid City Army Air Base, South Dakota, C. 1 July 1943
- Harvard Army Air Field, Nebraska, August 1943 – 11 November 1943
- RAF Rattlesden (Station 126), England, c. 29 November 1943 – c. 1 August 1945
- Drew Field, Florida, c. 14 August- 7 November 1945
- Bergstrom Field (later Bergstrom Air Force Base), Texas, 12 August 1947
- Castle Air Force Base, California, 26 June 1949 – 16 June 1951
- Sather Air Base, Iraq, April 2003 – c. 19 December 2011
- Incirlik Air Base, Turkey, October 2015 – present

=== Aircraft ===
- Boeing B-17G Flying Fortress, 1943–1945
- Boeing B-29 Superfortress, 1947–1951
- Fairchild Republic A-10 Thunderbolt II, 2015–present
- Boeing KC-135 Stratotanker, 2015–present

=== Awards and campaigns ===
Award streamer	Award	Dates	Notes
	Air Force Meritorious Unit Award	10 September 2003–30 April 2004	447th Air Expeditionary Group
	Air Force Meritorious Unit Award	1 May 2004–30 April 2005	447th Air Expeditionary Group
	Air Force Meritorious Unit Award	1 June 2009–31 May 2010	447th Air Expeditionary Group
	Air Force Meritorious Unit Award	1 June 2011–19 December 2011	447th Air Expeditionary Group
	Air Force Meritorious Unit Award	20 November 2015-2 May 2016	447th Air Expeditionary Group

Campaign Streamer	Campaign	Dates	Notes
	American Theater	1 May 1943 – 11 November 1943	447th Bombardment Group
	Air Offensive, Europe	29 November 1943 – 5 June 1944	447th Bombardment Group
	Normandy	6 June 1944 – 24 July 1944	447th Bombardment Group
	Northern France	25 July 1944 – 14 September 1944	447th Bombardment Group
	Rhineland	15 September 1944 – 21 March 1945	447th Bombardment Group
	Ardennes-Alsace	16 December 1944 – 25 January 1945	447th Bombardment Group
	Central Europe	22 March 1944 – 21 May 1945	447th Bombardment Group
	Liberation of Iraq	April 2003-1 May 2003	447th Air Expeditionary Group
	Transition of Iraq	2 May 2003 -28 June 2004	447th Air Expeditionary Group
	Iraqi Governance	29 June 2004 – 15 December 2005	447th Air Expeditionary Group
	National Resolution	16 December 2005 – 9 January 2007	447th Air Expeditionary Group
	Iraqi Surge	10 January 2007 – 31 December 2008	447th Air Expeditionary Group
	Iraqi Sovereignty	1 January 2009 – 31 August 2010	447th Air Expeditionary Group
	New Dawn	1 September 2010-c. 19 December 2011	447th Air Expeditionary Group

== See also ==
List of B-29 units of the United States Air Force
