= KBKV =

KBKV may refer to:

- Brooksville–Tampa Bay Regional Airport (ICAO code KBKV)
- KBKV (FM), a radio station (88.7 FM) licensed to serve Breckenridge, Colorado, United States
- KBKV-LD, a defunct low-power television station (channel 29) formerly licensed to serve Columbia, Missouri, United States
