= Hunter Harris Jr. =

United States Air Force general

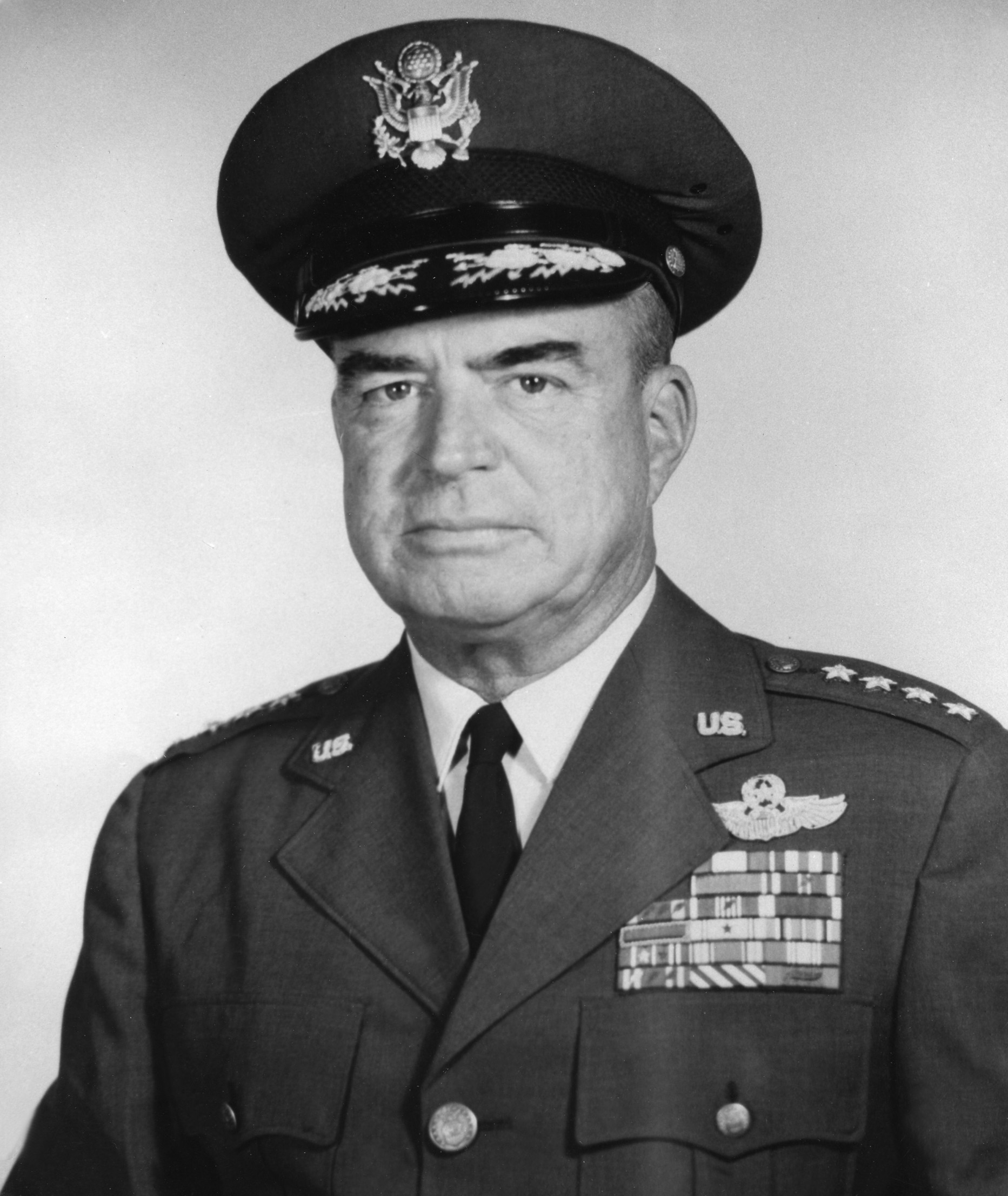
- General Hunter Harris Jr.
- Born: November 27, 1909; Fort Sam Houston, Texas
- Died: March 5, 1987 (aged 77); Honolulu, Hawaii
- Military career
- Allegiance: United States of America
- Branch: United States Air Force
- Service years: 1932–1967
- Rank: General
- Commands: Pacific Air Forces; Eighth Air Force; 47th Air Division
- Conflicts: World War II
- Awards: Silver Star; Legion of Merit; United States Distinguished Flying Cross (2); United Kingdom Distinguished Flying Cross; Air Medal (5)

Hunter Harris Jr. (November 27, 1909 – March 5, 1987) was a United States Air Force four-star general who served as Commander in Chief, Pacific Air Forces (CINCPACAF) from 1964 to 1967.

== Biography ==
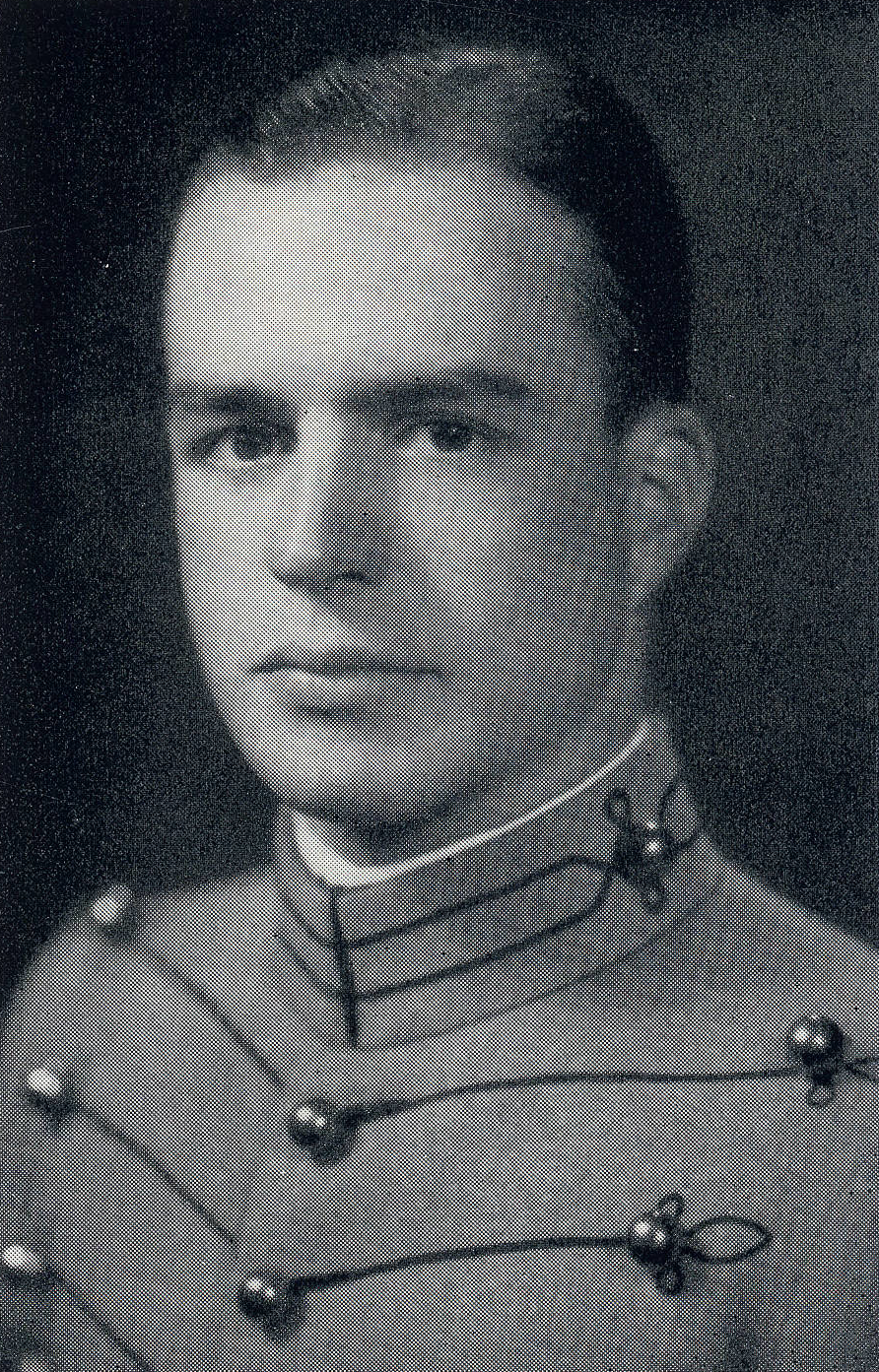
Harris as a West Point cadet c. 1932

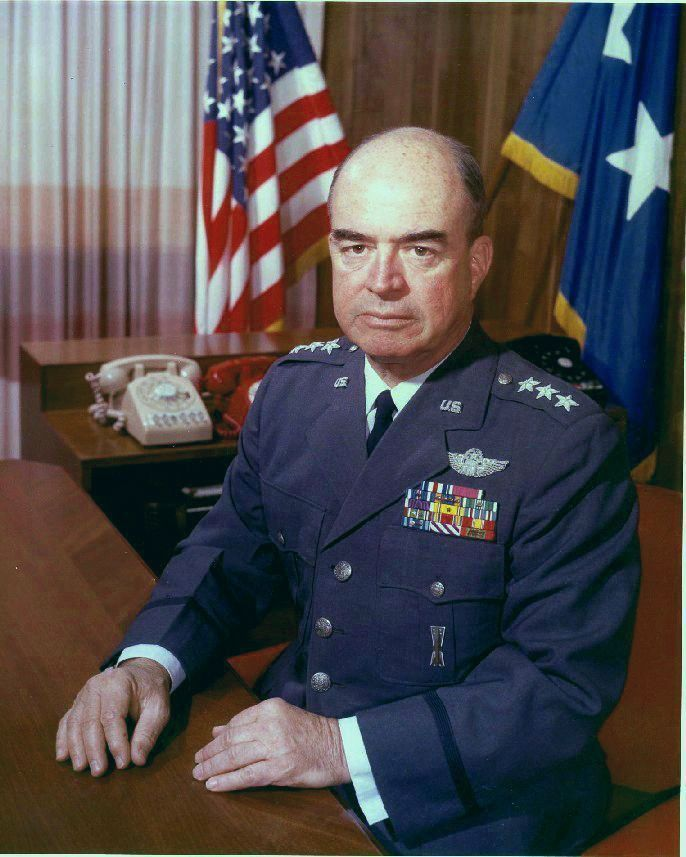
Lt. Gen. Hunter Harris Jr, Vice Commander-in-Chief of Strategic Air Command

Harris was born in Fort Sam Houston, Texas, in 1909, the son of Lula Allen Harris and Hunter Harris, an army officer. He attended the Virginia Military Institute, the University of Georgia, and graduated from the United States Military Academy as a second lieutenant of Infantry on June 10, 1932 and was detailed to the Army Air Corps for pilot flight training at Randolph Field and Kelly Field, Texas. He became a rated pilot in October 1933 and was assigned to the Army Air Corps February 16, 1934, and was stationed at March Field, California, where he held various group and squadron positions.

In March 1937, Harris went to Nichols Field, the Philippines, for duty with the 28th Bomb Squadron, and later served at Clark Field. In March 1940 he was assigned to Bolling Field, and in December 1941 became assistant operations officer with the Air Force Combat Command Headquarters at Bolling Field.

Harris was assigned to the War Department General Staff in March 1942 and in October assumed command of a B-17 Provisional Group and later became commander of the 447th Bomb Group. In the fall of 1943 he took the 447th Group to England. General Harris assumed command of the 13th Combat Bomb Wing of the Eighth Air Force in September 1944, and then was assigned as deputy chief of staff for operations of the Third Bomber Division of the Eighth Air Force in the European Theater in December 1944. During this service in Europe, he flew 25 combat missions in B-17s totaling 200 hours, followed by a few P-51 missions.

After returning to the United States in June 1945, he was assigned as deputy chief, Military Personnel Division, in charge of officer personnel, Headquarters Army Air Force, Washington, D.C. In August 1947, he entered the Air War College at Maxwell Field, Alabama, graduating in June 1948. His next assignment was as Air Force deputy commander, Armed Forces Special Weapons Project, Sandia Base, New Mexico. Harris assumed command of the 509th Bomb Wing, Eighth Air Force, at Walker Air Force Base, New Mexico in January 1950 and was appointed commanding general, 47th Air Division at Walker in January 1951. His next assignment in February 1952 was as chief of the War Plans Division, Deputy Chief of Staff/Operations, Headquarters U.S. Air Force, Washington, D.C. In November 1953, he was designated deputy director of plans at Headquarters U.S. Air Force and the Air Force member of the Joint Strategic Plans Committee of the Joint Chiefs of Staff.

Harris became deputy for operations in May 1955, at Headquarters Far East Air Forces and was later assigned to the staff of the commander in chief Pacific, as deputy chief of staff for plans and operations. In November 1958 he became deputy commander, Eighth Air Force, Strategic Air Command, Westover Air Force Base, Massachusetts, and in October 1961 he became commander.

On October 1, 1962, General Harris became vice commander in chief of the Strategic Air Command at Offutt Air Force Base, Nebraska, and August 1, 1964, assumed his assignment as commander of the Pacific Air Forces, Hickam Air Force Base, Hawaii. He retired from the Air Force on February 1, 1967, and died on March 5, 1987.

== Awards and decorations ==
He was a rated command pilot and technical observer. Harris' awards include:

- Air Force Distinguished Service Medal;
- Silver Star;
- Legion of Merit;
- Distinguished Flying Cross with oak leaf cluster;
- Air Medal with four oak leaf clusters;
- Commendation Medal with oak leaf cluster;
- Purple Heart;
- Distinguished Unit Citation;
- French Croix de Guerre with Palm;
- British Distinguished Flying Cross;
- Thai Order of the White Elephant 2nd class
- Chinese Order of the Cloud and Banner; 4th and 1st
- Korean Order of National Security Merit 1st type 1st Class as awarded from 1957 - 1964
- Korean Order of Military Merit, Taeguk Cordon.
