= Robert Edward Femoyer =

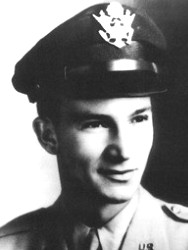
- Born: October 31, 1921; Huntington, West Virginia
- Died: November 2, 1944 (aged 23); England (Died of wounds)
- Burial place: Greenlawn Cemetery, Jacksonville, Florida
- Military career
- Allegiance: United States of America
- Branch: United States Army Air Forces
- Service years: 1942–1944
- Rank: Second Lieutenant
- Units: 711th Bombardment Squadron, 447th Bombardment Group (Heavy)
- Conflicts: World War II
- Awards: Medal of Honor; Purple Heart; Air Medal

Robert Edward Femoyer (October 31, 1921 – November 2, 1944) was a United States Army Air Forces officer, and is the only navigator to be awarded the Medal of Honor. He is also one of only eleven known Eagle Scouts to receive the Medal of Honor; the others are Aquilla J. Dyess, Eugene B. Fluckey, Thomas R. Norris, Arlo L. Olson, Mitchell Paige, Ben L. Salomon, Britt Slabinski, Leo K. Thorsness, Walter Joseph Marm Jr. and Jay Zeamer, Jr.

== Biography ==
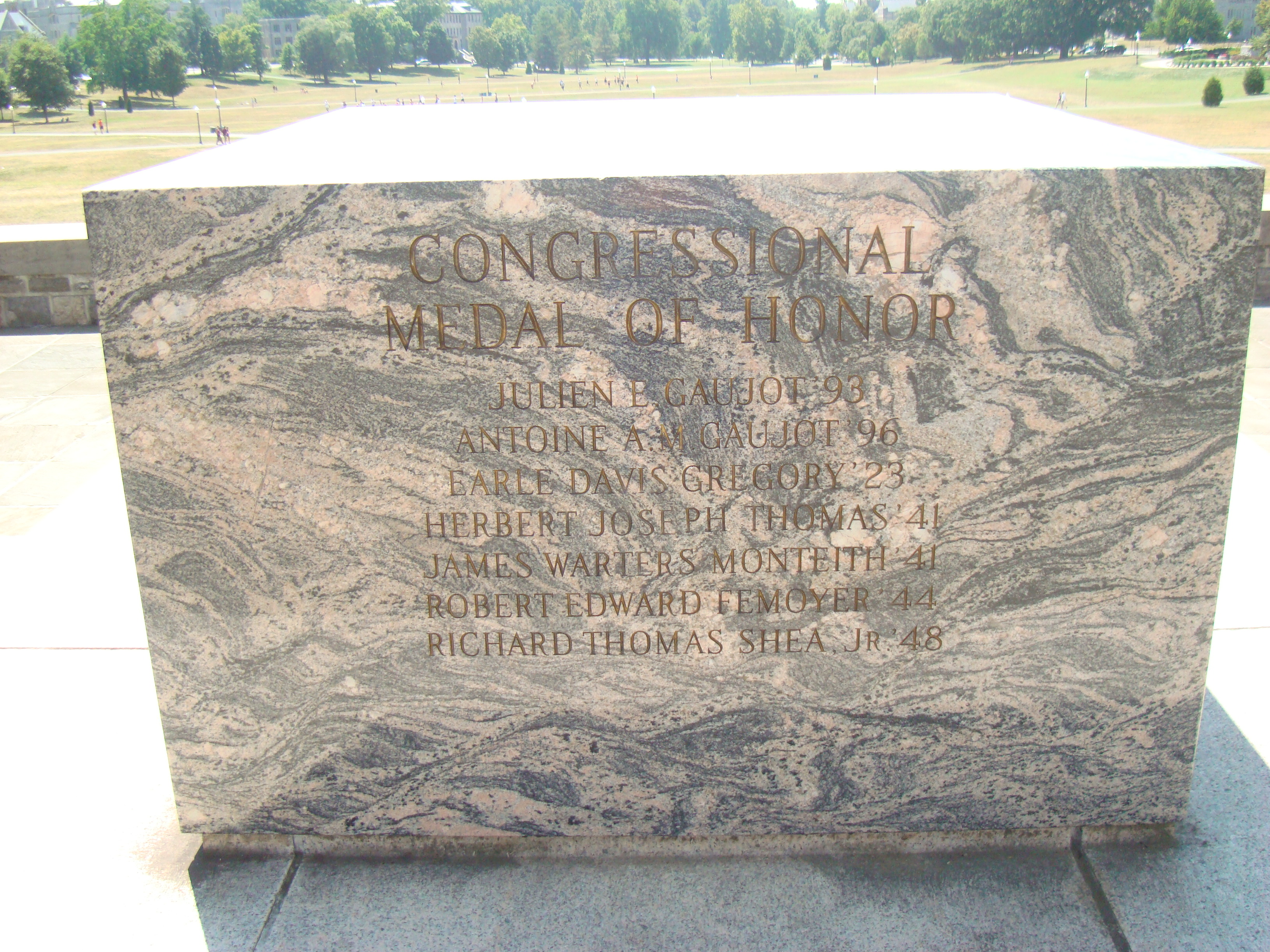
Femoyer's name on the Virginia Tech's MOH memorial stone.

Femoyer was from Huntington, West Virginia, an Eagle Scout, he attended Virginia Tech, from 1940 to 1943. A building at Virginia Tech was named in his honor from 1949 until 2021 when it was demolished. In 2023, Upper Quad Hall North was opened in its former site.

Femoyer joined the Enlisted Reserve Corps on November 11, 1942, and was called to active duty in February 1943. He took basic training at Miami Beach, Florida, aircrew training at the University of Pittsburgh, and became an aviation cadet at the Mississippi Institute of Aeronautics in Jackson but failed his pilot training. In 1944, he graduated from the Army Air Force (AAF) Flexible Gunnery School at Fort Myers, Florida, and the AAF Navigation School at Selman Field, Louisiana. From his training assignments, he went to the European Theater in September 1944, as a second lieutenant and was assigned to the 447th Bomb Group's 711th Bombardment Squadron.

Six weeks later, on November 2, 1944, he was the navigator of a B-17 Flying Fortress on a bombing mission over Merseburg, Germany, his bomber was struck by three antiaircraft shells and he was wounded. He was in pain and had significant blood loss, but refused morphine in order to keep his head clear while he continued to navigate the bomber for two and a half hours, changing course six times to avoid enemy antiaircraft fire. He remained alert though his pain was described as "almost beyond the realm of human endurance". Once the airplane was in safe airspace over the English Channel, Femoyer finally agreed to an injection of morphine; but thirty minutes after landing he died of wounds. His actions saved the lives of the entire crew. For his actions during this mission, he posthumously received the Medal of Honor. His body rests in Jacksonville, Florida.

== Military awards and other honors ==
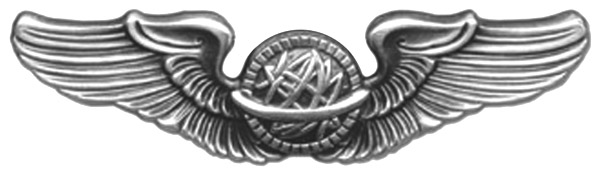

USAAF Navigator badge
Medal of Honor
Purple Heart	Air Medal	Army Good Conduct Medal
American Campaign Medal	European–African–Middle Eastern Campaign Medal with three bronze campaign stars	World War II Victory Medal

=== Medal of Honor citation ===
General Orders: War Department, General Orders No. 35, May 9, 1945

"The President of the United States in the name of The Congress takes pleasure in presenting the Medal of Honor (Posthumously) to

SECOND LIEUTENANT ROBERT EDWARD FEMOYER
UNITED STATES ARMY AIR FORCES

for service as set forth in the following CITATION:

For conspicuous gallantry and intrepidity at the risk of his life above and beyond the call of duty near Merseburg, Germany, on 2 November 1944. While on a mission, the bomber, of which 2d Lt. Femoyer was the navigator, was struck by 3 enemy antiaircraft shells. The plane suffered serious damage and 2d Lt. Femoyer was severely wounded in the side and back by shell fragments which penetrated his body. In spite of extreme pain and great loss of blood he refused an offered injection of morphine. He was determined to keep his mental faculties clear in order that he might direct his plane out of danger and so save his comrades. Not being able to arise from the floor, he asked to be propped up in order to enable him to see his charts and instruments. He successfully directed the navigation of his lone bomber for 2 1/2 hours so well it avoided enemy flak and returned to the field without further damage. Only when the plane had arrived in the safe area over the English Channel did he feel that he had accomplished his objective; then, and only then, he permitted an injection of a sedative. He died shortly after being removed from the plane. The heroism and self-sacrifice of 2d Lt. Femoyer are in keeping with the highest traditions of the U.S. Army.

/S/ HARRY S. TRUMAN"

=== Femoyer Hall ===
Virginia Tech's Femoyer Hall is named for Second Lieutenant Femoyer, a member of the Class of 1944. Femoyer Hall was originally built as a residence hall in 1949, and then served as an academic building, housing the Naval ROTC unit at Virginia Tech as well as the Student Success Center. In October 2021 it was demolished due to an overwhelming maintenance backlog, and will be replaced by a new dorm housing the Corps of Cadets.

== See also ==
- List of Medal of Honor recipients
- List of Medal of Honor recipients for World War II
