= Harvard State Airport =

Harvard State Airport Harvard Army Airfield
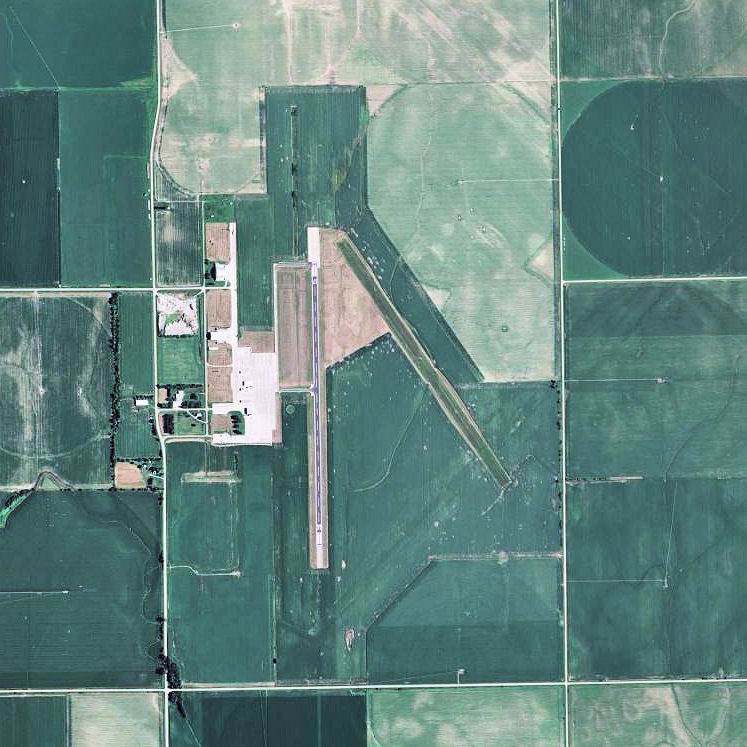
- 1999 USGS Photo
- IATA: none; ICAO: none; FAA LID: 08K

Summary
- Airport type: Public
- Owner: Nebraska Department of Aeronautics
- Serves: Harvard, Nebraska
- Location: Harvard Township, Clay County, near Harvard, Nebraska
- Elevation AMSL: 1,815 ft (553 m)
- Coordinates: 40°39′05″N 098°04′47″W

Map
- Location in Nebraska

Runways
Direction	Length		Surface
Direction	ft	m	Surface
14/32	3,900	1,189	Turf
17/35	3,745	1,141	Asphalt

Statistics (2008)
- Aircraft operations: 1,570
- Source: Federal Aviation Administration

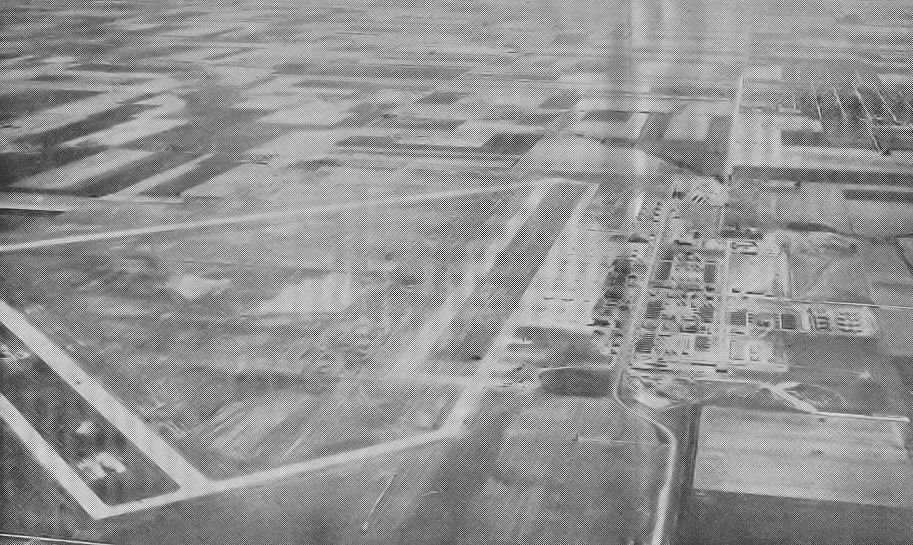
Harvard Army Airfield 1945, looking south

Harvard State Airport (FAA LID: 08K) (Harvard State Airfield) is two miles northeast of Harvard, in Clay County, Nebraska. It has no airline flights.

== History ==
Harvard Army Airfield was built in 1942 as a United States Army Air Forces training airfield. It is in a farming area, and covered 1,704 acres (6.90 km^{2}). It was one of eleven training airfields in Nebraska during World War II.

On 2 September 1942, an announcement was made to the community that a satellite Army Airfield would be built just northeast of Harvard. By September 17 construction began, farmers were removed from their properties, and by November 19, the work was nearly completed with 277 buildings and structures were built. It was a major World War II training center for bomber crews of the 2nd Air Force. Complete engine and air-frame repairs were available for B-17, B-24 and B-29 bombers at the five hangars on the field. Between August 1943 and December 1945, twenty six bombardment squadrons received proficiency training at Harvard AAF

The airfield was under the command of Second Air Force Headquarters, Colorado Springs, Colorado. The 521st Army Air Force Base Unit commanded the support elements at Harvard as part of Air Technical Service Command. The 521st was assigned to the 15th Bombardment Training Wing (September 1943 – March 1944), then transferred to the 17th Bombardment Training Wing in March 1944 for B-29 training.

The airfield was opened as a satellite base for Kearney AAF, but was soon scheduled for full-time operation as independent USAAF airfield. By early 1943, the base was on a 24-hour program of training Boeing B-17 Flying Fortress and Consolidated B-24 Liberator and crews for the European theater against the German Luftwaffe.

In March 1944, the Boeing B-29 Superfortress made its way to Harvard Airfield for training. From mid-1944 until May 1946, Super Fortresses from the airfield trained aircrews over Nebraska's countryside before they were sent to the Pacific theater.

At its peak about 6,000 officers and enlisted men were stationed at the base for training purposes, and many civilian workers from Harvard and surrounding communities worked at the base in support of this gigantic undertaking.

Known groups which trained at Harvard were:

- 447th Bombardment Group (August – 11 November 1943) (B-17 Flying Fortress)

708th, 709th, 710th and 711th Bombardment Squadrons
Deployed to Eighth Air Force in England.

- 484th Bombardment Group (20 September 1943 – 2 March 1944) (B-24 Liberator)

824th, 825th, 826th and 827th Bombardment Squadrons
Deployed to Fifteenth Air Force in Italy.

- 505th Bombardment Group (1 April – November 1944) (B-29 Superfortress)

482nd, 483rd and 484th Bombardment Squadrons
Deployed to Twentieth Air Force at Tinian.

- 501st Bombardment Group (22 August 1944 – 7 March 1945) (B-29 Superfortress)

21st, 41st and 485th Bombardment Squadrons
Deployed to Twentieth Air Force at Guam.

- 376th Bombardment Group (8 May – 25 June 1945) Retrained with (B-29 Superfortress)

512th, 513th, 514th, and 515th Bombardment Squadrons
Inactivated November 1945

- 450th Bombardment Group (26 July – 15 October 1945) Retrained with (B-29 Superfortress)

720th, 721st, 722nd, and 723rd Bombardment Squadrons
Inactivated 15 October 1945

- 467th Bombardment Group (8 September – December 1945) Retrained with (B-29 Superfortress)

788th, 789th, 790th and 791st Bombardment Squadrons
Inactivated 4 October 1946

Even after the surrender of the Japanese in September 1945, the Harvard base remained active for a period, until the base was declared surplus property on 21 May 1946 and turned over to the State. All Army material was packed and shipped out. Other than the four hangars, most of the buildings, including barracks, gymnasium, picture show, Service Club, chapel, weather station, post exchange and many other building were moved away or dismantled and sold for the lumber.

Most of the area that was once the Harvard Army Airfield has reverted to agriculture and the hangars are used for grain storage. In 1983, three of the hangars were destroyed by fire, which was started by careless use of a cutting torch by a pair of teenagers who were dismantling the first hangar for salvage. A handful of wartime buildings still exist on the former military airfield.

The housing erected by the federal government on the northeast edge of Harvard for personnel stationed at the base, most commonly referred to by Harvardites as "The Courts" or "Courts Addition," has been a residential village for the citizens of Harvard for many years.

== Facilities ==
Harvard State Airport covers 1,102 acres (446 ha) at an elevation of 1,815 feet (553 m). It has two runways: 17/35 is 3,745 by 60 feet (1,141 x 18 m) asphalt; 14/32 is 3,900 by 150 feet (1,189 x 46 m) turf. In the year ending July 24, 2008 the airport had 1,570 aircraft operations, 99% general aviation and 1% military.

== See also ==
- List of airports in Nebraska
- Nebraska World War II army airfields
