= Brooksville–Tampa Bay Regional Airport =

Brooksville–Tampa Bay Regional Airport Brooksville Army Airfield
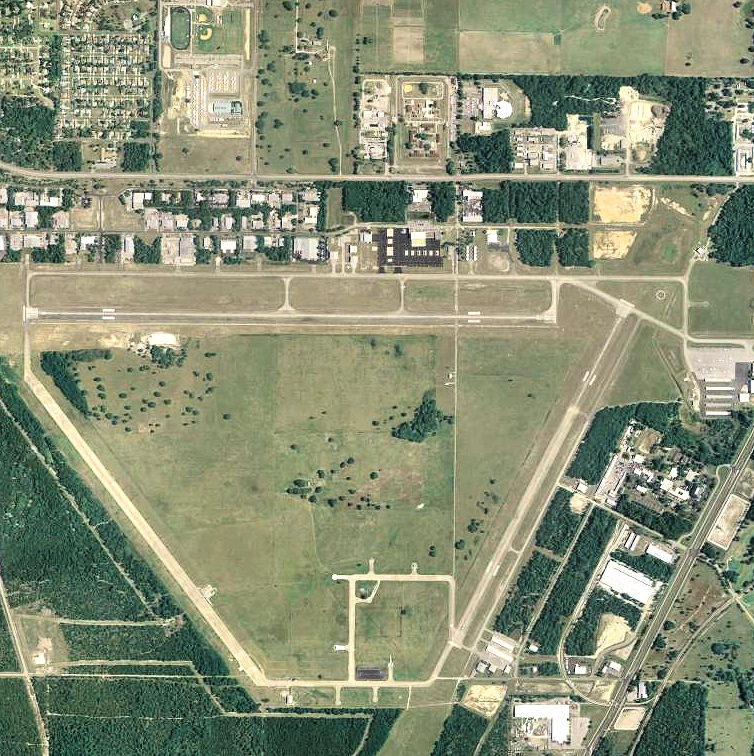
- 2006 USGS airphoto
- IATA: QSK; ICAO: KBKV; FAA LID: BKV

Summary
- Airport type: Public
- Owner: Hernando County
- Location: Hernando County, near Brooksville, Florida
- Elevation AMSL: 76 ft (23 m)
- Coordinates: 28°28′25″N 082°27′20″W
- Website: FlyBKV.com

Map
- Location of Hernando County Airport KBKV (the United States)

Runways
Direction	Length		Surface
Direction	ft	m	Surface
3/21	5,014	1,528	Concrete
9/27	7,001	2,134	Concrete

Statistics (2017)
- Aircraft operations (year ending 12/15/2017): 78,000
- Based aircraft: 181
- Source: Federal Aviation Administration

Brooksville–Tampa Bay Regional Airport (IATA: QSK, ICAO: KBKV, FAA LID: BKV), formerly known as Hernando County Airport, is a joint civil-military public airport located 6 nautical miles (11 km) southwest of the central business district of Brooksville, a city in Hernando County, Florida, United States. It is owned by Hernando County and is 45 miles (72 km) north of Tampa. While having consistent growth in its traffic rate, it does not yet serve the public through commercial airlines, but it does have charter and executive service.

This airport is assigned a three-letter location identifier of BKV by the Federal Aviation Administration, and its International Air Transport Association (IATA) airport code QSK .

== Facilities and aircraft ==
Brooksville–Tampa Bay Regional Airport covers an area of 2,402 acres (972 ha) which contains two concrete paved runways: 9/27 measuring 7,001 x 150 ft (2,134 x 46 m) and 3/21 measuring 5,014 x 150 ft (1,528 x 46 m). On October 15, 2012, the airport opened a Level I FAA contractor operated air traffic control tower, the first time the airport had had an operational control tower since it was Brooksville Army Airfield during World War II.

For the 12-month period ending December 15, 2017, the airport had 78,000 aircraft operations, an average of 214 per day: 93% general aviation, 6% military and <1% air taxi. There were at the time 181 aircraft based at this airport: 120 single engine, 24 multi-engine, 5 helicopters, 3 gliders, 11 military, 2 ultralights, and 16 jet aircraft.

== History ==
Hernando County Airport was opened in November 1942 by the United States Army Air Forces. Known as Brooksville Army Airfield, it was used as part of the Army Air Forces School of Applied Tactics (AAFSAT) tactical combat simulation school in Central and Northern Florida.

Headquartered at Orlando Army Air Base, AAFSAT's mission was to develop tactics and techniques of aerial warfare and to establish technical and tactical proficiency requirements for combat units to effectively engage and defeat enemy air forces. This was done with a wide variety of aircraft, including heavy strategic bombers, tactical fighters, medium and light bombers, reconnaissance aircraft and dive bombers, based at different airfields of the school.

AAFSAT used Brooksville as a heavy and medium bomber training base, assigning the following squadrons to the airfield:

- 1st Bombardment Squadron, December 15, 1942 – February 25, 1944 (Boeing B-17 Flying Fortress)
- 5th Bombardment Squadron, January 6-February 25, 1944, (B-24 Liberator), (North American B-25 Mitchell)
- 99th Bombardment Squadron, January 5-February 25, 1944 (B-25 Mitchell), (Martin B-26 Marauder)
- 430th Bombardment Squadron, January 6-February 25, 1944 (B-24 Liberator), (B-25 Mitchell), (B-26 Marauder)

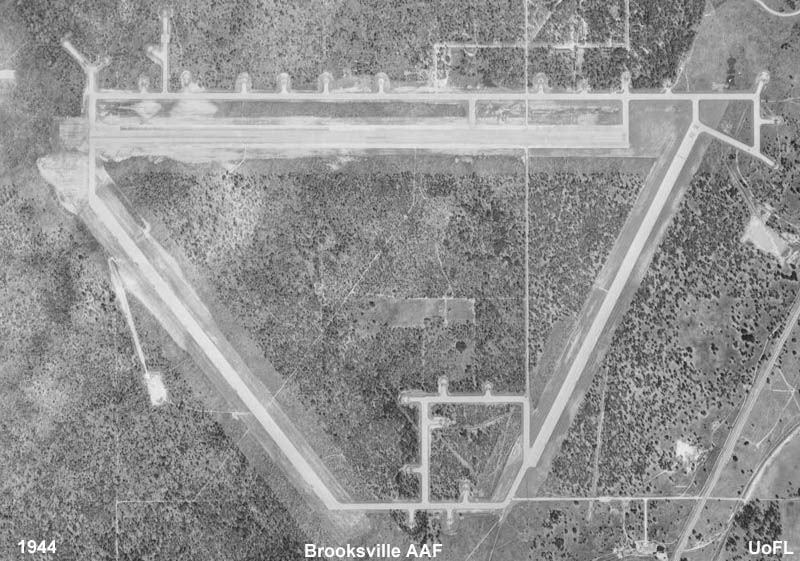
Aerial view of Brooksville Army Airfield in 1944

In March 1944, Brooksville was reassigned to Third Air Force and it became an auxiliary airfield of MacDill Army Airfield (now MacDill AFB) and Drew Army Airfield (now Tampa International Airport). The airfield came under the jurisdiction of the 377th Army Air Forces Base Unit, Squadron "A" becoming the operational unit. Under Third Air Force, Brooksville became a B-17 Flying Fortress heavy bomber replacement training base. Bomber crews assigned to the main base used the airfield as an overflow training base and as an emergency landing airfield, if necessary.

With the imminent end of the war in Europe, Brooksville AAF was notified on April 1, 1945, of its pending inactivation on June 30. With B-17s being used almost exclusively in Europe, the need for replacement personnel by Eighth and Fifteenth Air Force was ended.

In late 1945, the field was reported to the War Assets Administration (WAA) as being in surplus and between April 1946 and June 1947, the WAA sold or moved the on-site equipment to military locations where it could be better utilized. The land and left-over facilities were sold to the city of Brooksville by a General Services Administration (GSA) quitclaim deeds which contained clauses that limited the property to be used for a public airport only. Some of these clauses have since been modified by the Federal Aviation Administration.

Within a few years, the city of Brooksville transferred the property to Hernando County, which remains the current owner. Two small sections of the land have been sold to private interests and the rest is currently used by the county for an airport, 155-acre (0.63 km^{2}) industrial park, prison, land rentals, and tree farming.

In October 2012, the Hernando County Commission voted to change the name of the airport to Brooksville–Tampa Regional Airport, part of a county-wide re-branding effort of major facilities and infrastructure. This action remains controversial, with objections from the Hillsborough County Aviation Authority, the governmental entity overseeing Tampa International Airport and three general aviation airports in neighboring Hillsborough County. Following several months legal challenges by both governmental entities in Hernando County and Hillsborough County, mediation in late February/early March 2013 resulted in the airport being renamed again as Brooksville–Tampa Bay Regional Airport, a name change acceptable to both the Hernando County Commission and the Hillsborough County Aviation Authority.

== Army National Guard ==
Since 2000, the airport has been a joint civil-military airfield, home to the Florida Army National Guard's Army Aviation Support Facility #2 and Company B, 1st Battalion, 171st Aviation Regiment (B/1-171 AVN) and Detachment 1, Company H, 1st Battalion, 171st Aviation Regiment (Det 1 H/1-171 AVN), which relocated from their previous facility at Lakeland Linder International Airport, occupying newly constructed facilities adjacent to an existing Florida Army National Guard Armory that previously housed the 856th Quartermaster Battalion and continues to house Detachment 1 of C Company, 3rd Battalion, 20th Special Forces Group. The armory facility also provides additional administrative space for AASF #2. The units at FL ARNG AASF #2 currently fly the UH-60L Black Hawk helicopter, with ten UH-60L aircraft assigned. Det 1 previously flew the C-23B Sherpa fixed-wing cargo aircraft until the C-23 was retired from Army National Guard service in 2014.

== See also ==
- Army Air Force School of Applied Tactics
- Florida World War II Army Airfields
- List of airports in Florida
- List of airports in the Tampa Bay area
