= VIII Air Force Composite Command =

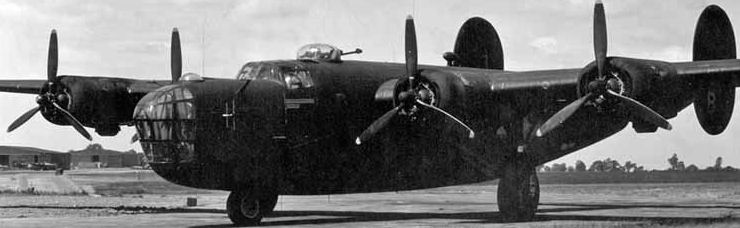
- B-24 Liberator 858th Squadron B-24D marked for Carpetbagger operations (Note: Aircraft is Consolidated B-24D-65-CO Liberator, serial 42-40509 "Cookie", Lost on 7 October 1943.)
- Active: 1942–1945
- Disbanded: 8 October 1948
- Country: United States
- Branch: United States Air Force
- Role: Training and Special Operations
- Engagements: European Theater of Operations

The VIII Air Force Composite Command was a subordinate command of Eighth Air Force. It was originally responsible for combat training of aircrews arriving from the United States, a mission it continued until near the end of the war, when the air divisions began the training. Starting in late winter of 1944, the command took over special operations missions, including night leaflet dropping, infiltration of agents behind enemy lines and supplying resistance forces in occupied countries. As Allied forces advanced across Europe, most of its personnel were used to form provisional disarmament units. The command was disbanded in October 1948, when the United States Air Force decided it would have no future need for a level of command between major commands and air divisions.

== Lineage ==
- Established as 8th Air Force Composite Command (Note: The unit was constituted and activated with an arabic number in its name. The use of roman numerals to designate Army Air Forces combat commands did not begin until September 1942. "Air Force Historical Research Agency Organizational Reconds: Types of USAF Organizations". Air Force History Index. 9 January 2008.)

Activated c. 4 July 1942
Redesignated VIII Air Force Composite Command on 18 September 1942
Inactivated c. 31 May 1945
Disbanded 8 October 1948

=== Assignments ===
- Eighth Air Force, c. 4 July 1942 (Note: In February 1944, the original Eighth Air Force was redesignated United States Strategic Air Forces. Maurer, Combat Units, pp. 463-464.)
- Eighth Air Force, 22 February 1944 (Note: In February 1944, VIII Bomber Command was redesignated Eighth Air Force. Maurer, Combat Units, pp. 471-472.)
- Ninth Air Force, February 1945 – c. 31 May 1945

=== Components ===
Groups

- 1st Combat Crew Replacement Center Group (Bombardment, Heavy, Special), 12 November 1943 – c. 31 May 1945
- 2d Combat Crew Replacement Center Group (Bombardment, Heavy, Special), 12 November 1943 – c. 31 May 1945
- 3d Combat Crew Replacement Center Group (Bombardment or Fighter, Special), 21 November 1943 – c. 23 September 1944, 10 October 1944 – 1 February 1945 (attached to Air Disarmament Command [Provisional])
- 4th Combat Crew Replacement Center Group (Bombardment or Fighter, Special), 21 November 1943 – c. 31 May 1945
- 5th Combat Crew Replacement Center Group, 3 November 1943 – c. 31 May 1945
- 328th Service Group, 26 February 1944–c. August 1944
- 482d Bombardment Group, 14 February – 1 October 1944
- 492d Bombardment Group, c. 10 August – 1 October 1944
- 495th Fighter Training Group, 26 October – December 1943, February 1944–September 1944
- 496th Fighter Training Group, 11 December – December 1943; February – September 1944
- 801st Bombardment Group (Provisional) 28 March – 4 August 1944
- 2900th Combat Crew Replacement Center Group (Provisional), 16 August – 14 November 1943
- 2901st Combat Crew Replacement Center Group (Provisional), 20 August – 12 November 1943
- 2902d Combat Crew Replacement Center Group (Provisional), 23 August – 21 November 1943
- 2915th Combat Crew Replacement Center Group (Provisional), 16 August – 12 November 1943

Squadrons

- 36th Bombardment Squadron, 26 February – 1 October 1944 (attached to 328th Service Group, 27 February 1944; 801st Bombardment Group (Provisional), 28 March 1944 – 4 August 1944)
- 406th Bombardment Squadron, 26 February – 1 October 1944 (attached to 328th Service Group, 27 February 1944; 801st Bombardment Group (Provisional), 28 March 1944 – 4 August 1944)
- 788th Bombardment Squadron, 11 May – 10 August 1944 (attached to 801st Bombardment Group (Provisional))
- 850th Bombardment Squadron, 11 May – 10 August 1944 (attached to 801st Bombardment Group (Provisional))
- 858th Bombardment Squadron, 19 June – 5 August 1944

=== Stations ===
- Bolling Field, District of Columbia, c. 4 July 1942
- RAF Long Kesh (Station 232), Northern Ireland, 12 September 1942 – November 1942
- Kirkassock House (Station 231), Northern Ireland, November 1942 -February 1944
- RAF Cheddington (Station 113), England, 22 February 1944
- RAF Watford (Station 341), England, c. 1 October 1944
- Creil Airfield (see fr:Base aérienne 110 Creil, A-81), France, February 1945
- Luxemburg Luxemburg, c. 30 April 1945–c. 31 May 1945
