= 856th Bombardment Squadron =

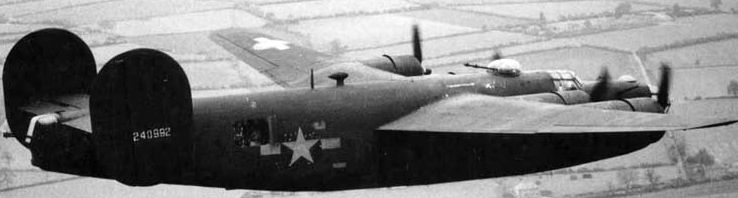
- 856th Bomb Squadron B-24D (Note: Aircraft is Consolidated B-24D-120-CO Liberator, serial 42-40992, Red Ball Express. This plane has been identified as assigned to the squadron, but the squadron flew B-24H and B-24J models. Freeman, p. 262.)
- Active: 1943–1945
- Country: United States
- Branch: United States Air Force
- Role: Special operations
- Engagements: European Theater of Operations
- Decorations: Distinguished Unit Citation; French Croix de Guerre with Palm

Insignia
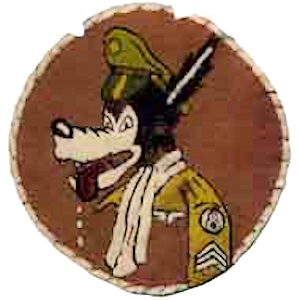
- 856th Bombardment Squadron emblem

The 856th Bombardment Squadron was a United States Army Air Forces unit. it was first activated in October 1943 as one of the original Consolidated B-24 Liberator squadrons of the 492d Bombardment Group. After deploying to England, the 492d entered the strategic bombing campaign against Germany, but in three months of combat, the 492d Group suffered the most severe losses of an Eighth Air Force bomber group. The 492d Group was withdrawn from combat in August 1944, and the 856th moved on paper to replace the 36th Bombardment Squadron, which was engaged in Operation Carpetbagger, dropping agents and supplies behind German lines, primarily in France. As American forces advanced in France, this special operations mission diminished. The squadron briefly transported fuel to mechanized units in France, then returned to special operations in Scandinavia and Germany under the operational control of Eighth Air Force until the end of hostilities in Europe. It returned to the United States for conversion to Boeing B-29 Superfortresses, but was inactivated in October 1945.

== History ==
=== Training and strategic bombing ===
The squadron was first organized in October 1943 at Alamogordo Army Air Field, New Mexico, as one of the original squadrons of the 492d Bombardment Group. Its cadre was drawn from the 859th Bombardment Squadron, a former antisubmarine unit whose mission had transferred to the Navy. By January 1944, most of the ground echelon of the squadron had been used to form other bomber units. 2d Bombardment Division, which controlled VIII Bomber Command's Liberator units in England, began to form a new ground echelon for the squadron from personnel of bomber units already in England, while the air echelon of the 856th continued training with Consolidated B-24 Liberators at Alamogordo. The air echelon began to depart Alamogordo on 1 April 1944, following the southern ferry route, while the few remaining members of the ground echelon departed on 11 April, sailing on the RMS Queen Elizabeth on 20 April.

On 14 April, the ground echelon that had been formed in England arrived at RAF North Pickenham. (Note: Although North Pickenham had been the squadron's nominal station since 1 January, it was actually being assembled at other 2d Bombardment Division stations. Freeman, p. 262.) The air echelon began arriving on 18 April. The squadron flew its first combat mission on 11 May 1944, joining the strategic bombing campaign with attacks primarily on targets in central Germany. During the first week in June, the squadron was diverted from strategic targets to support Operation Overlord by attacking airfields and V-1 flying bomb and V-2 rocket launch sites. It bombed coastal defenses and lines of communication to support Operation Overlord, the invasion of France. After the D-Day landings, it continued interdiction attacks until the middle of the month.

After supporting Operation Cobra, the breakout at Saint Lo, the squadron resumed bombardment of strategic targets in Germany. However, during its three months of strategic operations the 492d Group suffered the heaviest losses of any Eighth Air Force group. The group's heavy losses had begun with one of the group's earliest missions, an attack on Braunschweig, in which it lost eight Liberators to enemy interceptors. When the 492d Group returned to strategic operation, on 20 June Luftwaffe fighters, primarily Messerschmitt Bf 110s, using air to air rockets shot down fourteen of the 492d Group's B-24s. Heavy losses, this time to fighters from Jagdgeschwader 3, were again suffered on 29 June. (Note: Superstitious persons speculated that the hard luck group reputation had passed from the 44th Bombardment Group to the 392d Bombardment Group and it was now resting on the 492d Group. Freeman, p. 160. Others speculated that the Luftwaffe was concentrating on the 492d Group because it was the first Liberator group to arrive in the theater with uncamouflaged B-24s. However, other groups were receiving uncamouflaged planes to replace their losses. Postwar review of Luftwaffe records does not support the theory that the Luftwaffe singled out any unit for particular attention. However, Luftwaffe fighter controllers, naturally, directed fighters to what they perceived as the most vulnerable portions of the American bomber formations, a position that the 492d Group seems to have occupied a disproportionate number of times. Freeman, p. 172.) On 5 August, the decision was made to withdraw the 492d Group from combat.

=== Special operations ===
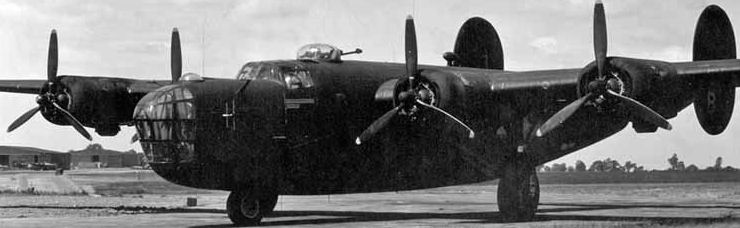
B-24D marked for Carpetbagger operations (Note: Aircraft is Consolidated B-24D-65-CO Liberator, serial 42-40509 "Cookie", Lost on 7 October 1943.)

The 856th Squadron moved to RAF Harrington in August, where it assumed the Operation Carpetbagger missions and most of the personnel and equipment of the 36th Bombardment Squadron. With the 492d Group, the squadron flew 198 Operation Carpetbagger missions by the middle of September. With black-painted aircraft configured with engine flame dampeners and optimized for night operations, the group operated chiefly over France with B-24s and Douglas C-47 Skytrains, transporting agents, supplies, and propaganda leaflets to Resistance fighters. As Allied forces moved forward through northern France and into Belgium, the need for Carpetbagger missions decreased and operations ended on 16 September 1944. The squadron's support for the French Resistance earned it the French Croix de Guerre with Palm. With the drawdown of the Carpetbagger mission, the squadron concentrated on hauling gasoline to advancing mechanized forces in France and Belgium. After December 1944, the squadron began limited night bombing operations.

Although the reduced level of Carpetbagger operations diverted the majority of the 492d Group to other missions, the 856th Squadron resumed the missions in October 1944, when it received all of the 492d Group C-47s. Now missions were flown to the Netherlands, Norway and Denmark, with a total of 41 missions flown in the winter of 1944–1945. These missions were flown under the direct control of Eighth Air Force under the direction of the Office of Strategic Services. Norwegian missions continued to the end of the war, although the majority of missions flown to support Norwegian operations were flown by a secret operation in Kallax Airfield, Sweden under the direction of Colonel Bernt Balchen. Some of the squadron's crews were also detached to the 406th Bombardment Squadron for Nickling, or leaflet dropping missions. The squadron returned to the control of the 492d Group in March 1945, when some of its crews began operations from Dijon Airfield, France, flying agents into Germany under the names Operation Red Stocking and Operation Skywave. These operations continued until 26 April 1945.

The squadron left England for the United States in early August 1945. In August 1945 it began to reform at Kirtland Field, New Mexico as a Boeing B-29 Superfortress very heavy bomber squadron, however it became unnecessary when the Pacific War ended and it was inactivated on 17 October 1945.

== Lineage ==
- Constituted as the 856th Bombardment Squadron, Heavy on 14 September 1943

Activated on 1 October 1943
Redesignated 856th Bombardment Squadron, Very Heavy on 5 August 1945
Inactivated on 17 October 1945

=== Assignments ===
- 492d Bombardment Group, 1 October 1943 – 17 October 1945

=== Stations ===
- Alamogordo Army Air Field, New Mexico, 1 October 1943
- RAF North Pickenham (AAF-143), England, 1 January 1944
- RAF Harrington (AAF-179), England, 10 August 1944
- Sioux Falls Army Air Field, South Dakota, 14 August 1945
- Kirtland Field, New Mexico, 17 August – 17 October 1945

=== Aircraft ===
- Consolidated B-24 Liberator, 1943–1945
- Douglas C-47 Skytrain, 1944–1945
- Douglas A-26 Invader, 1945
- de Havilland Mosquito, 1945

=== Awards and campaigns ===
Award streamer	Award	Dates	Notes
	Distinguished Unit Citation	20 March 1945–25 April 1945	(German Occupied Territory)
	French Croix de Guerre with Palm	6 August 1944–16 September 1944	

Campaign Streamer	Campaign	Dates	Notes
	Air Offensive, Europe	1 January 1944 – 5 June 1944	
	Air Combat, EAME Theater	1 January 1944 – 11 May 1945	
	Central Europe	22 March 1944 – 21 May 1945	
	Normandy	6 June 1944 – 24 July 1944	
	Northern France	25 July 1944 – 14 September 1944	
	Southern France	15 August 1944 – 14 September 1944	
	Rhineland	15 September 1944 – 21 March 1945	
