= 857th Bombardment Squadron =

857th Bombardment Squadron (Later 557th Tactical Air Support Squadron )
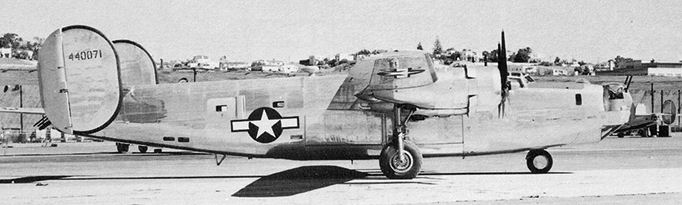
- 857th Squadron B-24 Liberator just after delivery to the unit. (Note: Aircraft is Consolidated B-24J-145-CO Liberator, serial 44-40071. It was later transferred to the 66th Bombardment Squadron.)
- Active: 1943-1945; 1958–1962
- Country: United States
- Branch: United States Air Force
- Role: Bombardment
- Motto: Nihil Nisi Optimus (Latin for 'Nothing but the Best')
- Engagements: European Theater of Operations
- Decorations: French Croix de Guerre with Palm

Insignia
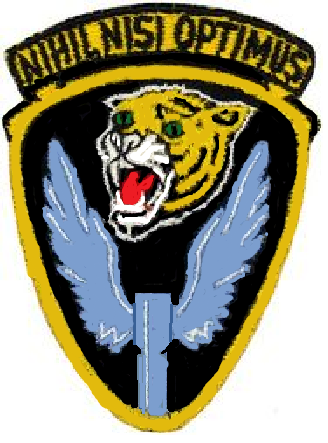
- 657th Bombardment Squadron emblem

The 857th Bombardment Squadron is one of the two predecessors of the 557th Tactical Air Support Squadron, an inactive United States Air Force unit, formed in 1985 by the consolidation of the 857th with another inactive bombardment squadron. It has never been active under its most recent designation.

The 857th was a United States Army Air Forces unit. it was first activated in October 1943 as one of the original Consolidated B-24 Liberator squadrons of the 492d Bombardment Group. After deploying to England, the 492d entered the strategic bombing campaign against Germany, but in three months of combat, the 492d Group suffered the most severe losses of an Eighth Air Force bomber group. The 492d Group was withdrawn from combat in August 1944, and the 857th moved on paper to replace the 850th Bombardment Squadron, which was engaged in Operation Carpetbagger, dropping agents and supplies behind German lines, primarily in France. As American forces advanced in France, this special operations mission diminished. The squadron transported fuel to mechanized units in France, then participated in night bombing. It was inactivated in October 1945.

The other predecessor of the squadron was the 657th Bombardment Squadron, a Strategic Air Command unit that flew Boeing B-47 Stratojets from 1958 until 1962.

== History ==
=== World War II ===
==== Training and strategic bombing ====
The squadron was first organized in October 1943 at Alamogordo Army Air Field, New Mexico, as one of the original squadrons of the 492d Bombardment Group. Its cadre was drawn from the 859th Bombardment Squadron, a former antisubmarine unit whose mission had transferred to the Navy. By January 1944, most of the ground echelon of the squadron had been used to form other bomber units. 2d Bombardment Division, which controlled VIII Bomber Command's Liberator units in England, began to form a new ground echelon for the squadron from personnel of bomber units already in England, while the air echelon of the 857th continued training with Consolidated B-24 Liberators at Alamogordo. The air echelon began to depart Alamogordo on 1 April 1944, following the southern ferry route, while the few remaining members of the ground echelon departed on 11 April, sailing on the RMS Queen Elizabeth on 20 April.

On 14 April, the ground echelon that had been formed in England arrived at RAF North Pickenham (Note: Although North Pickenham had been the squadron's nominal station since 1 January, it was actually being assembled at other 2d Bombardment Division stations. Freeman, p. 262.) The air echelon began arriving on 18 April. The squadron flew its first combat mission on 11 May 1944, joining the strategic bombing campaign with attacks primarily on targets in central Germany. During the first week in June, the squadron was diverted from strategic targets to support Operation Overlord by attacking airfields and V-1 flying bomb and V-2 rocket launch sites. It bombed coastal defenses in Normandy on D-Day, 6 June 1944, and continued interdiction attacks until the middle of the month.

Except for support of Operation Cobra, the breakout at Saint Lo, the squadron then resumed bombardment of strategic targets in Germany. However, during its three months of strategic operations the 492d Group suffered the heaviest losses of any Eighth Air Force group. On 5 August, the decision was made to withdraw the 492d Group from combat. The group's heavy losses had begun with one of the group's earliest missions, an attack on Braunschweig, in which it lost eight Liberators to enemy interceptors. When the 492d Group returned to strategic operation, on 20 June Luftwaffe fighters, primarily Messerschmitt Bf 110s, using air to air rockets shot down fourteen of the 492d Group's B-24s. Heavy losses, this time to fighters from Jagdgeschwader 3, were again suffered on 29 June. (Note: Superstitious persons speculated that the hard luck group reputation had passed from the 44th Bombardment Group to the 392d Bombardment Group and it was now resting on the 492d Group. Freeman, p. 160. Others speculated that the Luftwaffe was concentrating on the 492d Group because it was the first Liberator group to arrive in the theater with uncamouflaged B-24s. However, other groups were receiving uncamouflaged planes to replace their losses. Postwar review of Luftwaffe records does not support the theory that the Luftwaffe singled out any unit for particular attention. However, Luftwaffe fighter controllers, naturally, directed fighters to what they perceived as the most vulnerable portions of the American bomber formations, a position that the 492d Group seems to have occupied a disproportionate number of times. Freeman, p. 172.)

==== Special operations ====
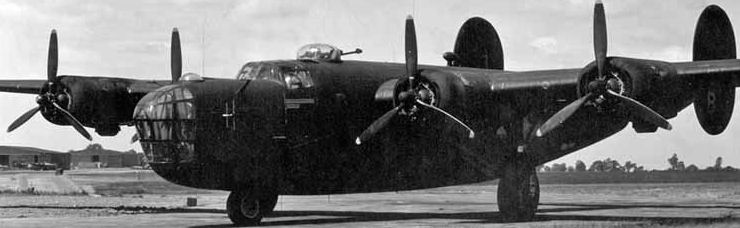
858th Squadron B-24D marked for Carpetbagger operations (Note: Aircraft is Consolidated B-24D-65-CO Liberator, serial 42-40509 "Cookie", Lost on 7 October 1943.)

The 857th Squadron moved to RAF Harrington in August, where it assumed the Operation Carpetbagger missions and most of the personnel and equipment of the 850th Bombardment Squadron. With the 492d Group, the squadron flew 185 Operation Carpetbagger missions by the middle of September. With black-painted aircraft configured with engine flame dampeners and optimized for night operations, the group operated chiefly over France with B-24s and C-47s, transporting agents, supplies, and propaganda leaflets to patriots. As Allied forces moved forward through northern France and into Belgium, the need for Carpetbagger missions decreased and operations ended on 16 September 1944. The squadron's support for the French Resistance earned it the French Croix de Guerre with Palm. With the drawdown of the Carpetbagger mission, the squadron concentrated on hauling gasoline to advancing mechanized forces in France and Belgium. After December 1944, the squadron began limited night bombing operations.

In March 1945, the squadron's crews and planes were assigned to other units, while it moved on paper to RAF Bassingbourn, where it took over the fighters of the former 1st Scouting Force and came under the control of the 1st Air Division. The scouting force had been organized in July 1944 to precede bomber formations attacking Europe and provide them with information to avoid weather, and in some cases, enemy interceptors. The squadron continued this mission until the end of hostilities. The squadron left England for the United States in early August 1945. In August 1945 it began to reform at Kirtland Field, New Mexico as a Boeing B-29 Superfortress very heavy bomber squadron, however it became unnecessary when the Pacific War ended and it was inactivated on 17 October 1945.

=== Strategic Air Command ===
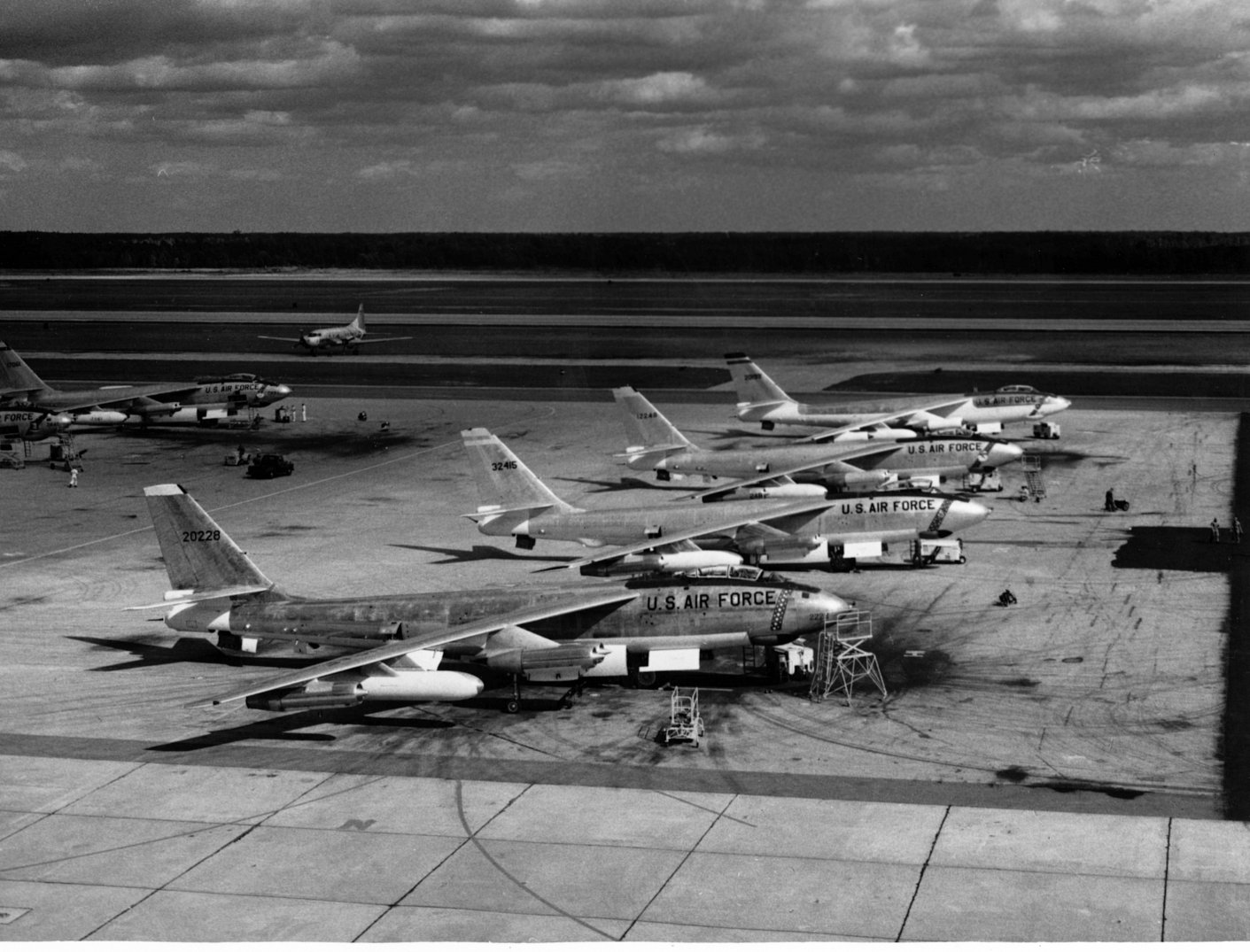
B-47s of Strategic Air Command

Starting in 1958, the Boeing B-47 Stratojet wings of Strategic Air Command (SAC) began to assume an alert posture at their home bases, reducing the amount of time spent on alert at overseas bases. The SAC alert cycle divided itself into four parts: planning, flying, alert and rest to meet General Thomas S. Power’s initial goal of maintaining one third of SAC’s planes on fifteen minute ground alert, fully fueled and ready for combat to reduce vulnerability to a Soviet missile strike. To implement this new system, B-47 wings reorganized from three to four squadrons. The 657th Bombardment Squadron was activated at Lake Charles Air Force Base as the fourth squadron of the 68th Bombardment Wing. The SAC alert commitment was increased to half the wing's aircraft in 1962 and the four squadron pattern no longer met the alert cycle commitment, so the squadron became non-operational on 1 October 1961 and was inactivated on 1 January 1962.

In September 1985, the 857th Bombardment Squadron and the 657th Bombardment Squadron were consolidated as the 557th Tactical Air Support Squadron, but the consolidated squadron has never been active.

== Lineage ==
857th Bombardment Squadron

- Constituted as the 857th Bombardment Squadron, Heavy on 14 September 1943

Activated on 1 October 1943
Redesignated as: 857th Bombardment Squadron, Very Heavy on 5 August 1945
Inactivated on 17 October 1945
Consolidated with the 657th Bombardment Squadron as the 557th Tactical Air Support Squadron on 15 September 1985

657th Bombardment Squadron

- Constituted as the 657th Bombardment Squadron, Medium on 20 August 1958

Activated on 1 December 1958
Inactivated on 1 January 1962
Consolidated with the 857th Bombardment Squadron as the 557th Tactical Air Support Squadron on 15 September 1985

=== Assignments ===
- 492d Bombardment Group, 1 October 1943 – 17 October 1945 (attached to 1st Air Division, 10 March-14 August 1945)
- 68th Bombardment Wing, 1 December 1958 – 1 January 1962 (not operational after 1 October 1961)

=== Stations ===
- Alamogordo Army Air Field, New Mexico, 1 October 1943
- RAF North Pickenham (Station 143), England, 1 January 1944
- RAF Harrington (Station 179), England, 10 August 1944
- RAF Bassingbourn (Station 121), England, 10 March 1945
- RAF Alconbury (Station 102), England, 11 June–6 August 1944
- Sioux Falls Army Air Field, South Dakota, 14 August 1945
- Kirtland Field, New Mexico, 17 August–17 October 1945
- Lake Charles Air Force Base (later Chennault Air Force Base), Louisiana, 1 December 1958 – 1 January 1962

=== Aircraft ===
- Consolidated B-24 Liberator, 1943–1945
- Douglas C-47 Skytrain, 1944–1945
- North American P-51 Mustang, 1945
- Douglas A-26 Invader, 1945
- Boeing B-17 Flying Fortress, 1945
- Boeing B-47 Stratojet, 1958–1962

=== Awards and campaigns ===
Award streamer	Award	Dates	Notes
	French Croix de Guerre with Palm	6 August 1944-16 September 1944	857th Bombardment Squadron

Campaign Streamer	Campaign	Dates	Notes
	Air Offensive, Europe	1 January 1944 – 5 June 1944	857th Bombardment Squadron
	Air Combat, EAME Theater	1 January 1944 – 11 May 1945	857th Bombardment Squadron (Note: Not listed in Maurer, but unit meets award standards.)
	Central Europe	22 March 1944 – 21 May 1945	857th Bombardment Squadron
	Normandy	6 June 1944 – 24 July 1944	857th Bombardment Squadron
	Northern France	25 July 1944 – 14 September 1944	857th Bombardment Squadron
	Southern France	15 August 1944 – 14 September 1944	857th Bombardment Squadron
	Rhineland	15 September 1944 – 21 March 1945	857th Bombardment Squadron
