= 2641st Special Group =

2641st Special Group (Provisional)
- Active: 1944-1945
- Country: United States
- Branch: United States Army Air Forces
- Role: Special Operations

The 2641st Special Group (Provisional) was a United States Army Air Forces unit. Its last assignment was with Fifteenth Air Force, based at Rosignano Airfield, Italy. It was inactivated on 20 May 1945.

== Overview ==
Thus the primary mission of the Special Group was insertion and supply of Office of Strategic Services (OSS) agents behind enemy lines in Italy and the Balkans and the supply of resistance and partisan forces operating in these areas. The bulk of the operation was in support of the 2677th Regiment OSS (Provisional) at Bari Airfield, Italy. Later targets would include Austria as OSS efforts concentrated on the rumored construction of a "National Redoubt" in the Austrian Alps from which a last-ditch defense of Nazism was anticipated.

== History ==
Engaged in special operations in the Mediterranean Theater of Operations, December 1944-May 1945. The 885th Bomb Squadron operated primarily in Italy. The 859th Bomb Squadron operated primarily in the Balkans. When weather conditions made it advisable to operate in one area or the other, both squadrons were employed in the same area.

The squadrons of the Special Group operated specially modified B-17 Flying Fortresses and B-24 Liberators painted all black with very limited identification markings. The 885th operated both types of aircraft while the 859th operated only Liberators. The aircrews were trained in low-altitude night operations in which the pilot, navigator, and bombardier worked together to guide the aircraft to the drop zone (DZ). This often necessitated traversing mountainous terrain followed by descent into deep valleys, in darkness, guided in the final approach by the eyes of the bombardier and the hands of the pilot. Final approach to the DZ was at an altitude of a few hundred feet at near stall speeds.

Several Distinguished Unit Citations and numerous commendations were awarded to the two squadrons and to the 2641st Special Group (Prov) as a result of their efforts. The 859th received the French Croix de Guerre with Palm for support of the French Resistance during Operation Carpetbagger in the summer of 1944. At the time the 859th was based at RAF Harrington, England with the 801st/492d Bombardment Group, Eighth Air Force.

The 885th was also awarded the Croix de Guerre with Palm for operations in support of the French Resistance and a Distinguished Unit Citation for operations on the night of 12/13 August 1944. On that date the 885th, while based at Blida Airport, Algeria, delivered a total of 18 agents and 67,000 pounds of war material to the Resistance in the south of France.

The 2641st Special Group (Prov) received a Unit Citation for operations in Italy's Po Valley on the night of 17/18 February 1945 in which both the 885th and 859th squadrons participated. Again, the Special Group was designated the 15th Special Group (Prov) at the time of this operation but by the time the Unit Citation was issued it had been designated the 2641st Special Group (Prov) and, according to Col. MacCloskey, the Unit Citation carried that designation.

At the peak of its operations in February 1945, the Special Group delivered thirty-four agents and over two million pounds of weapons and supplies while operating twenty-six out of twenty-eight days and flying approximately one-half million miles. Three hundred and fifty-four successful sorties (nearly 14 per day on average) were flown out of four hundred and eighty-six attempts. The vast majority of unsuccessful sorties were the result of "no reception" at the target drop zones. This feat was accomplished by forty-eight aircrews, thirty-four aircraft, and their ground support personnel.

These efforts were not without cost. During its brief five-month period of operation (January - May), the Special Group lost to flak, fighters and the hazards of special operations a total of seven aircraft with thirty-five crewman killed in action. These losses were on top of previous losses suffered by the two component squadrons in their prior assignments. In addition, as a result of these losses, several crewmen of the Special Group spent time in German prisoner of war camps during the last days of the war in Europe.

=== Lineage ===
- Established by General Orders (GO) Number 284 issued by Headquarters Fifteenth Air Force (HQ 15th AAF) on 18 January 1945, which authorized organization of the 15th Special Group (Provisional) as of 0001 hours, 20 January 1945.

Group had actually formed on 17 December 1944

Redesignated as: 2641st Special Group (Provisional) on 6 March 1945.
Inactivated on: 20 May 1945

=== Assignments ===
- Fifteenth Air Force, 18 January-20 May 1945

=== Stations ===
- Brindisi Airfield, Italy, 17 December 1944
- Rosignano Airfield, Italy, 24 March-20 May 1945

=== Aircraft ===
- B-17 Flying Fortress, 1944–1945
- B-24 Liberator, 1944–1945
- Other aircraft types were used as needed

=== Components ===
- 885th Bombardment Squadron (Attached), 17 December 1944 – 20 May 1945
- 859th Bombardment Squadron (Attached), 17 December 1944 – 20 May 1945
