= 36th Electronic Warfare Squadron =

36th Electronic Warfare Squadron

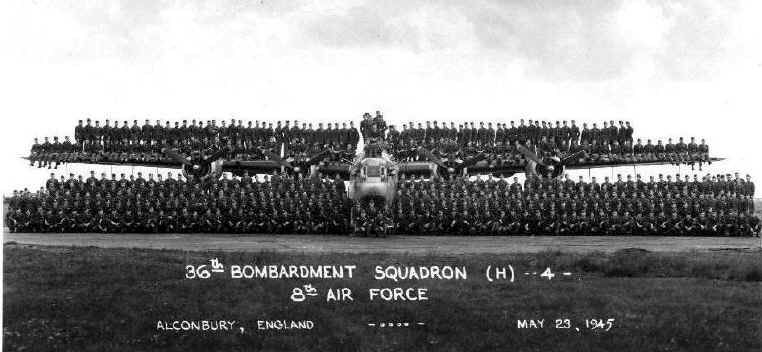
- Group photo of the 36th Bombardment Squadron, Alconbury Airfield, England, May 1945
- Active: 1940-1945; 1993-present
- Country: United States
- Branch: United States Air Force
- Role: Bombardment; Special operations; Electronic warfare
- Part of: Air Combat Command
- Garrison/HQ: Eglin AFB
- Engagements: World War II: Aleutian Islands Campaign (1942-1943); European Theater of Operations

- Decorations: Distinguished Unit Citation; Air Force Outstanding Unit Award

Insignia
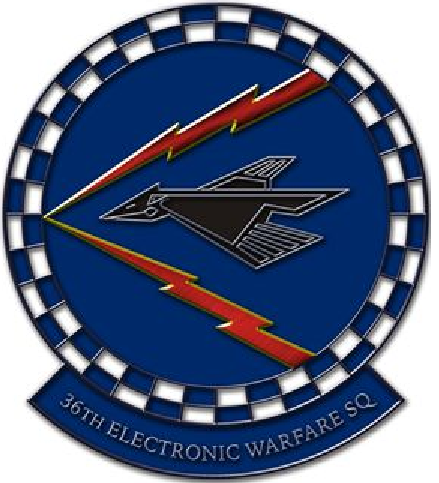
- 36th Electronic Warfare Squadron emblem

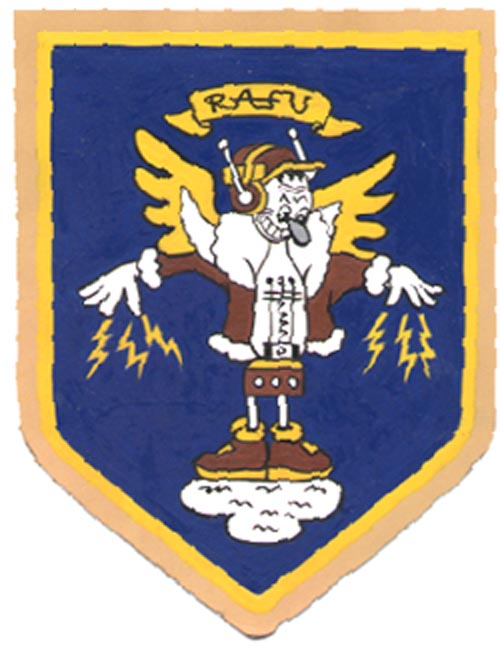
- 36th Bombardment Squadron emblem
- World War II fuselage code: R5

The 36th Electronic Warfare Squadron is an active United States Air Force unit. It is stationed at Eglin Air Force Base, Florida, where it is assigned to the 350th Spectrum Warfare Wing.

During World War II, as the 36th Bombardment Squadron the squadron conducted special operations and electronic warfare missions over Europe from 1943 until the end of the war.

== History ==
1940-1941 Reconnaissance and photo-mapping of Bering Sea and Alaska using B-18 Bolos.

=== December 1941 – August 1943 Combat in the Northern Pacific ===
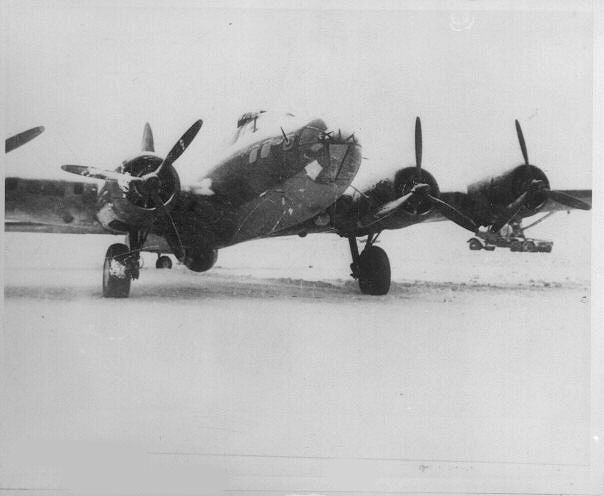
30th Bombardment Squadron B-17E at Amchatka Army Airfield, Alaska

Assigned to Alaska where served to defend the territory after Japan attacked the United States at the end of 1941. The unit helped force the withdrawal of Japanese ships that attacked Dutch Harbor in June 1942, flew missions against occupied Kiska until the Japanese evacuated that island in August 1943,

=== December 1943— August 1944 Carpetbagger Operations ===
In November 1943, a unit was formed to clandestinely deliver agents and supplies into Nazi-occupied Europe for the Office of Strategic Services (O.S.S.). To address this mission, the 36th Bombardment Squadron with specially modified B-24 Liberators were formed and activated at RAF Alconbury, England. It was attached to the 482nd Bombardment Group. This was the beginning of Operation Carpetbagger.

The purpose of the Carpetbagger project was to fly special operations missions which entailed delivering supplies to resistance groups in enemy occupied countries.

Owing to lack of sufficient facilities at Alconbury, in mid-December the squadron was reassigned to the Eighth Air Force Composite Command (Special Operations Group), (remaining attached to the 482d Bomb Group) and moved to RAF Watton (Station 376), near Thetford in Norfolk. The move to RAF Watton did not prove to be fortuitous. The heavy B-24s were incompatible with the grass runways and muddy hard standings there and were forced to move back to Alconbury in January 1944.

A new airfield under construction in the depths of rural Northamptonshire, RAF Harrington (Station 179) proved ideal for Carpetbagger operations. The advanced echelon of the squadrons moved into Harrington on 25 March 1944. On 1 April the squadron was assigned to the 801st Bombardment Group (Provisional).

In August 1944, the 801st Bombardment Group was absorbed by the 492d Bombardment Group (Heavy). The 492d was a "hard luck" B-24 group which had lost 52 aircraft to enemy action in only 89 days, suffering 588 men killed or missing. Rather than try to rebuild the shattered group, the group was stood down and the surviving members were reassigned to other units in theater. The operational squadrons of the 801st were stood down and redesignated as the squadrons assigned to the 492d. The 36th Squadron's personnel and equipment were reassigned to the 856th Bombardment Squadron, and the 36th was reassigned to VIII Fighter Command as an unattached unit without equipment or personnel.

=== August 1944— April 1945 Electronic—countermeasures operations ===
The redesignation of the Carpetbagger squadrons made the designation of "36th Bomb Squadron" available again and it was assigned to the 803d Bomb Squadron, a provisional squadron then located at RAF Cheddington.

The 36th Bomb Squadron was the Eighth Air Force's only electronic warfare squadron using specially equipped B-24s to jam German VHF communications during large Eighth Air Force daylight raids. In addition, the 36th BS flew night missions with the Royal Air Force Bomber Command's 100 Group which controlled the British electronic warfare and countermeasures squadrons.

The radar countermeasure effort came under RAF Bomber Command where they performed a variety of special operations activities. The missions included Window (Chaff), Jostle, Carpet, Mandrel, and other ramifications. Many of the jamming systems were developed and tested by Allied scientists associated with the Telecommunications Research Establishment, namely the American-British Laboratory Division 15 (ABL-15) located at Great Malvern. RCM operations were designed to deny the Germans effective utilization of radar and radio equipment.

The 36th BS's missions involved trickery, ingenious deception, spoofs, and tank communications jamming. The squadron flew on bad weather days during the Battle of the Bulge as well, when the rest of the Eighth Air Force stood down.

Along with these electronic warfare missions, the 36th BS also flew regular sorties which set out to discover the frequencies being used by the enemy for their radio and radar devices. For this they operated a number of Lockheed P-38 Lightning twin boomed fighters from Alconbury as well as their B-24s.

All operations ceased by 30 April 1945.

=== Test activities ===
The squadron was redesignated the 36th Engineering and Test Squadron and activated as a test organization at Eglin Air Force Base in 1993. Redesignated the 36th Electronic Warfare Squadron in 1999, it has continued to test electronic equipment since then.

== Lineage ==
- Constituted as the 36th Bombardment Squadron (Heavy) on 1 February 1940.

Redesignated 36th Bombardment Squadron Heavy on 20 August 1943
Inactivated on 15 December 1945

- Redesignated 36th Engineering and Test Squadron on 9 April 1993

Activated on 15 April 1993

- Redesignated 36th Electronic Warfare Squadron on 13 September 1999

=== Assignments ===
- 28th Composite Group, 1 February 1940
- Fourth Air Force, 19 October 1943
- Eighth Air Force, 2 November 1943
- 1st Bombardment Division, 21 November 1943 (attached to 482d Bombardment Group after 4 December 1943)
- VIII Air Force Composite Command, 27 February 1944 (attached to 328th Service Group until c. 27 March 1944, 801st Bombardment Group [Provisional], March – 5 August 1944)
- VIII Fighter Command, 1 October 1944
- 1st Air Division, 1 January 1945 (attached to 482d Bombardment Group, 27 February – c. 15 May 1945)
- 3d Air Division, 12 August 1945
- 1st Air Division, 1 September 1945
- United States Air Forces in Europe, October – 15 December 1945
- 68th Electronic Combat Group (later 53d Electronic Warfare Group), 15 April 1993
- 350th Spectrum Warfare Group 25 June 2021 – present

=== Stations ===
- March Field, California, 1 February 1940
- Lowry Field, Colorado, 9 August 1940 – 23 March 1941
- Elmendorf Field, Alaska, 31 March 1941
- Fort Greely, Alaska, c. 9 February 1942 – 28 May 1943

Operated from various airfields in Alaska, including Umnak, Kodiak, Adak, and Amchitka, during period 4 June 1942 to 1 May 1943

- Amchitka Army Airfield, Alaska, 4 May-13 September 1943

Operated from Adak Army Airfield, Alaska, 1 June-4 August 1943

- McChord Field, Washington, 30 September— October 1943
- RAF Alconbury (AAF-102), England, c. 6 November 1943
- RAF Watton (AAF-378), England, 15 December 1943 (operated from RAF Alconbury)
- RAF Harrington (AAF-179), England, 28 March 1944
- RAF Cheddington (AAF-113), England, 14 August 1944
- RAF Alconbury (AAF-102), England, 28 February 1945
- RAF Grove (AAF-519), England, 15 October C. 9 December 1945
- Camp Kilmer, New Jersey, 14 – 15 December 1945
- Eglin Air Force Base, 15 April 1993 – present

=== Aircraft ===
- Douglas B-18 Bolo, 1940–1942
- Boeing B-17 Flying Fortress, 1942–1943
- Consolidated LB-30 (B-24A) Liberator, 1942
- Consolidated B-24H/J Liberator, 1942–1945

== See also ==
- Radar jamming and deception
- List of World War II electronic warfare equipment
