= 906th Air Refueling Squadron =

906th Air Refueling Squadron

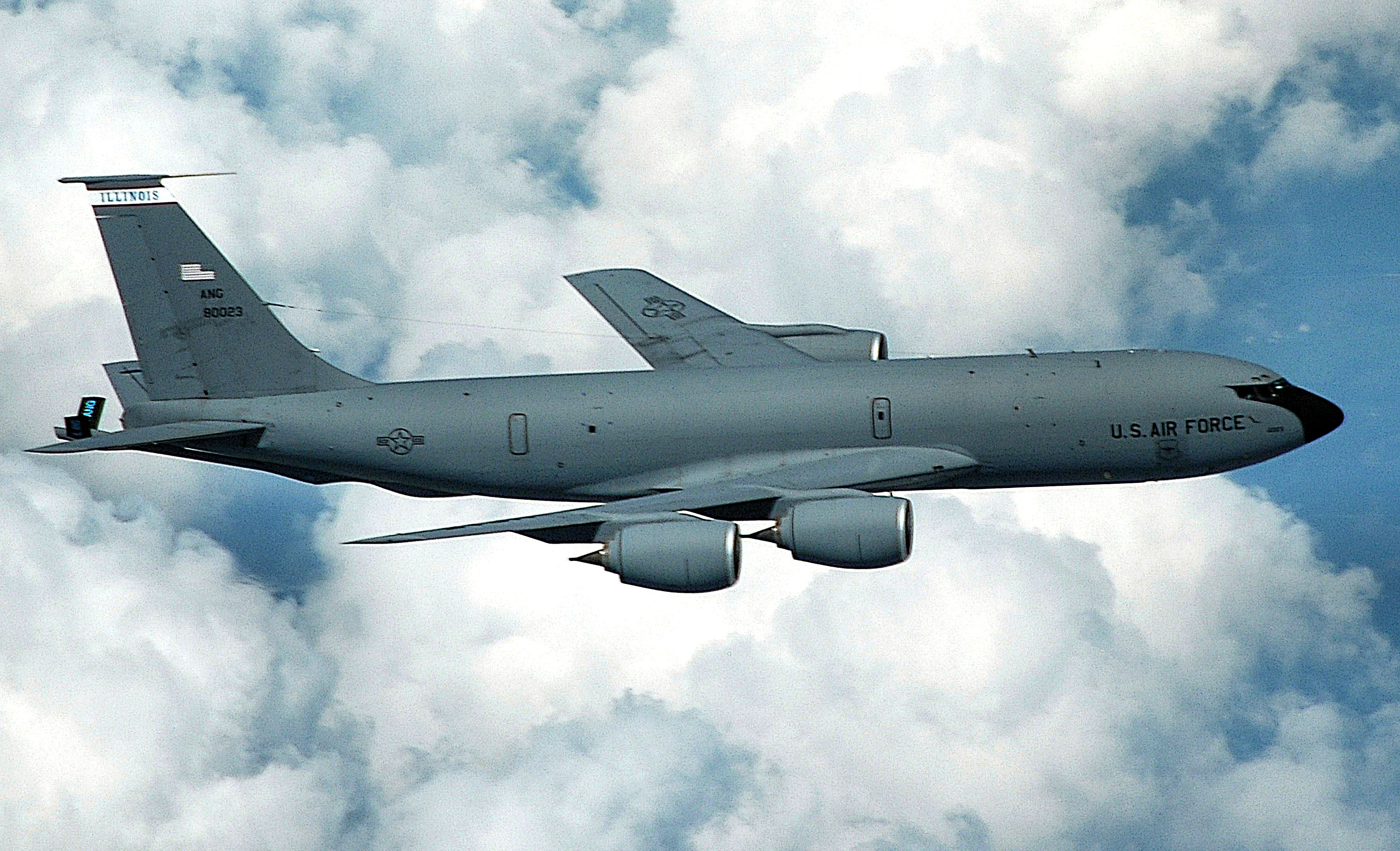
- A KC-135R Stratotanker of the 108th Air Refueling Squadron (Note: The 906th is an Active Associate of the 108th.)
- Active: 1941–1945; 1959–present
- Country: United States
- Branch: United States Air Force
- Role: Air Refueling
- Part of: Air Mobility Command
- Garrison/HQ: Scott Air Force Base, Illinois
- Motto: Global Refueling
- Engagements: Aleutian Islands Campaign; Operation Carpetbagger
- Decorations: Air Force Outstanding Unit Award; French Croix de Guerre with Palm

Insignia
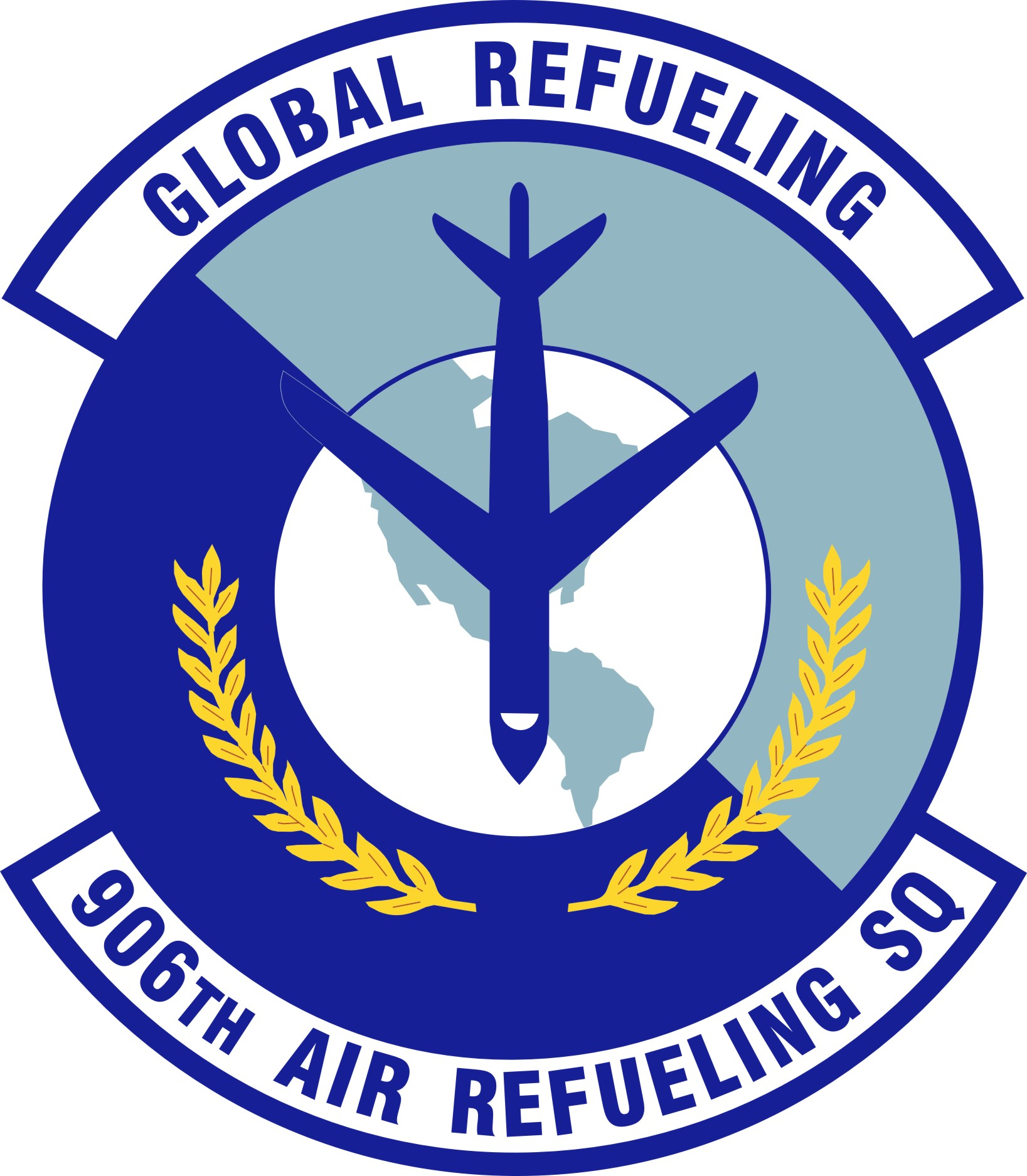
- 906th Air Refueling Squadron emblem (Note: Approved 10 July 1961. Description: On a disc per bend Light Blue and Air Force Blue within an Air Force Golden Yellow border, a White globe displaying the continents of North and South America, Light Blue outlined Air Force Blue, above two (2) Air Force Golden Yellow olive branches, details Golden Brown, originating in base and arched, one to dexter (right) and one to sinister (left); over all in downward flight palewise, a silhouetted stylized aircraft, Air Force Blue.)

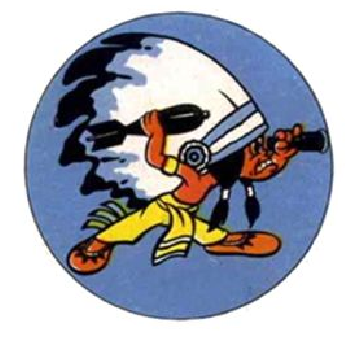
- 406th Bombardment Squadron emblem (Note: Approved 12 July 1942. Description: On a light blue disc "Indian Boy" red, wearing a large feather headdress, white, red, and black banded at the head light blue and yellow, yellow trousers, white sash about the waist trimmed red and yellow, red moccasins, trimmed black, white, and blue, peering through telescope held in left hand and throwing a black aerial bomb held aloft in right hand.)

The 906th Air Refueling Squadron is an active United States Air Force unit. It is an active associate squadron and part of the 375th Air Mobility Wing at Scott Air Force Base, Illinois.

The squadron was first activated in United States military buildup just before World War II as the 16th Reconnaissance Squadron. After the attack on Pearl Harbor, the squadron participated in the Antisubmarine Campaign of the American Theater of Operations. As the 406th Bombardment Squadron it also served in the Aleutian Islands Campaign of the Pacific Theater of Operations and several campaigns in the European Theater of Operations. The squadron was unusual in that it received campaign credit in three different theaters of operation.

The 906th Air Refueling Squadron was activated as part of Strategic Air Command's nuclear deterrent force. It maintained aircraft on alert throughout the Cold War. The squadron deployed aircrews and aircraft to support combat operations in Southeast Asia from the mid 1960s through the early 1970s. It also supported numerous contingency operations from its bases in the northern United States and forward operating locations until moving to Scott in 2009 and becoming an active associate unit of the Illinois Air National Guard.

== Mission ==
The 906th operates the Boeing KC-135R Stratotanker aircraft conducting air refueling missions. It is an active associate unit and the airmen of the 906th operate and maintain the aircraft of the 126th Air Refueling Wing and fly with the 108th Air Refueling Squadron of the Illinois Air National Guard.

== History ==
=== World War II ===
The first predecessor of the 906th Air Refueling Squadron was established as the 16th Reconnaissance Squadron. It was assigned to the 3d Bombardment Wing, but was under the operational control of the 42d Bombardment Group, to which it was assigned the following year. Since a reorganization of General Headquarters Air Force in September 1936, each bombardment group of the Army Air Forces (AAF) had an attached reconnaissance squadron, which operated the same aircraft as that group's assigned bombardment squadrons. That arrangement continued for units like the 39th that were designated as medium bombardment units. The squadron drew its cadre from the 88th Reconnaissance Squadron and was equipped with a mixture of Douglas B-18 Bolos, Lockheed A-29 Hudsons, and a few Martin B-26 Marauder medium bombers. After the Japanese attack on Pearl Harbor, the squadron flew antisubmarine patrols over the Pacific until early May 1942.

==== Aleutian Campaign ====
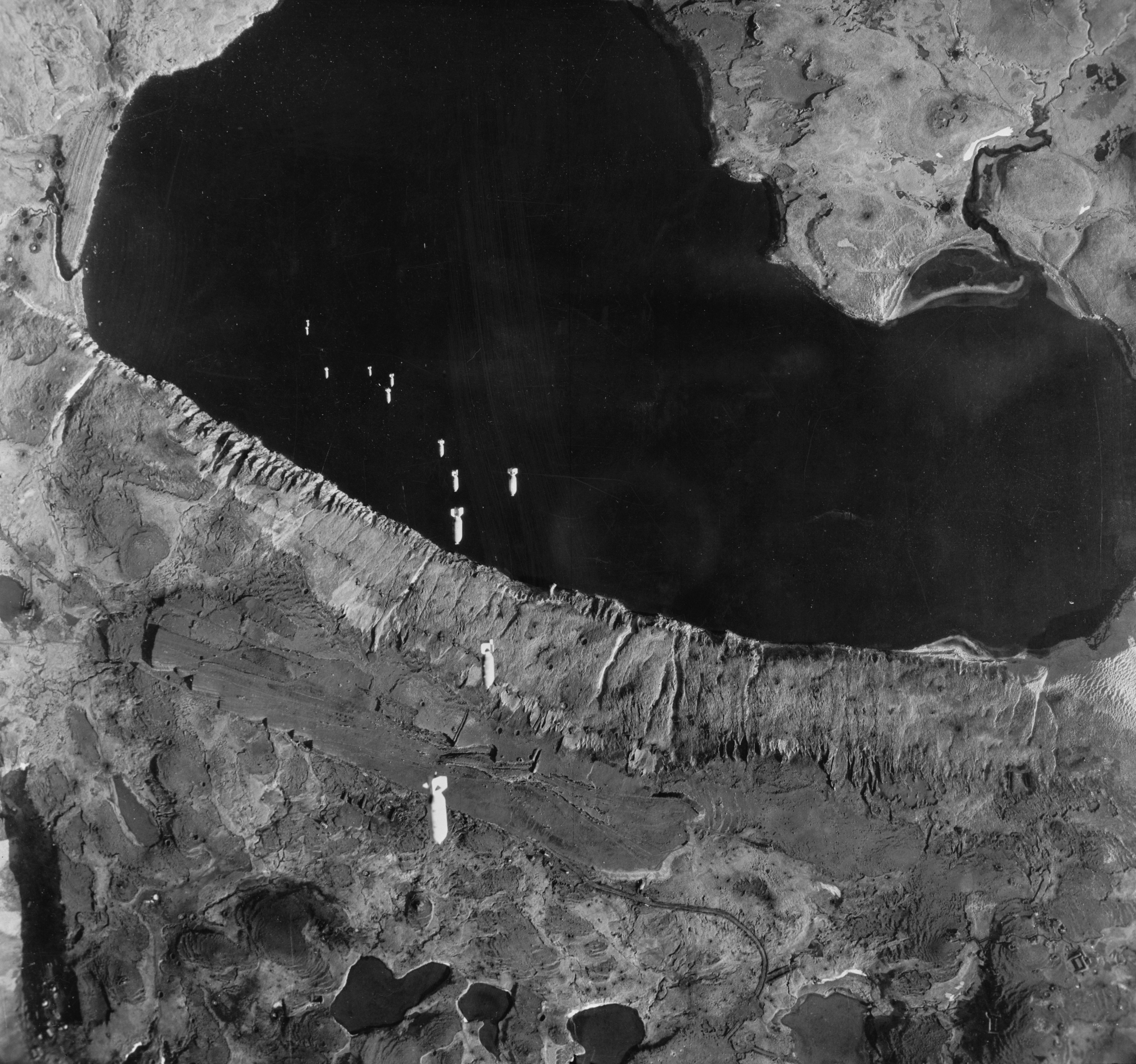
Bombing attack on Kiska Island

Following Pearl Harbor, military planning called for Alaska to be defended by units based in the Zone of the Interior, which would deploy only their air echelons, which would move forward to Alaska as they were needed. The 42d Bombardment Group was tabbed as one of the units to deploy combat elements to Alaska. The Japanese invasion of the Aleutian Islands showed that permanent units were necessary for Alaskan defense. However, because of other demands, only the 406th and the 77th Bombardment Squadrons of the group deployed to Alaska, where they were attached to the 28th Composite Group. The squadron continued antisubmarine operations in the Gulf of Alaska and detachments of the squadron flew combat missions during the Aleutian Campaign from forward bases on Adak and Amchitka with North American B-25 Mitchells, attacking enemy targets on Dutch Harbor that helped force the withdrawal of enemy ships and on Kiska until the Japanese withdrew from the island. The squadron returned to the Continental United States in late 1943 and was briefly assigned to Fourth Air Force.

==== Combat in Europe ====
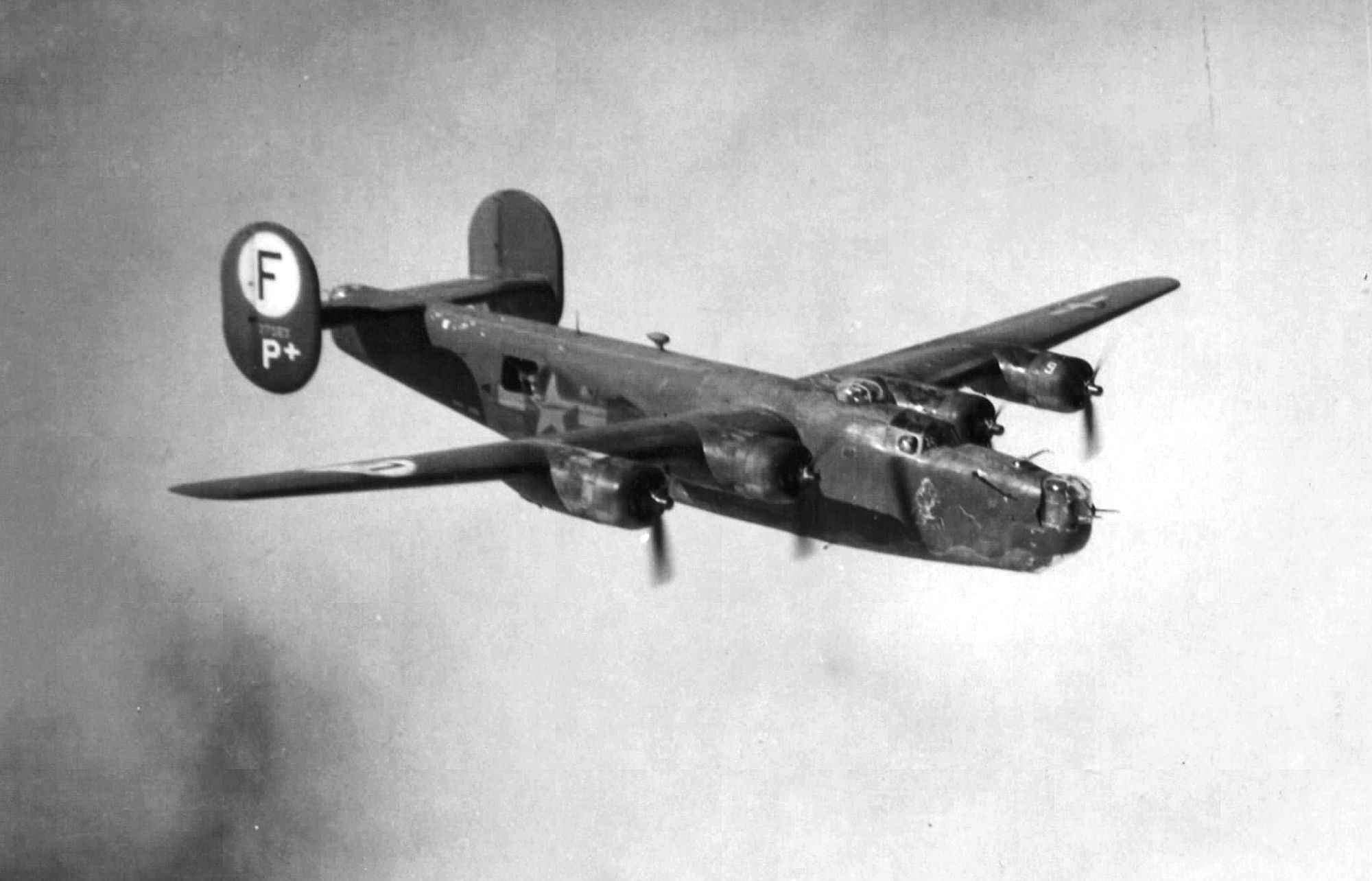
B-24 Liberator equipped for Carpetbagger missions

The squadron moved on paper to the European Theater of Operations in November where it was organized from crews and aircraft formerly assigned to the 479th Antisubmarine Group. The 406th received its cadre at RAF Alconbury from the ground echelon of the 4th Antisubmarine Squadron and the air echelon of the 22d Antisubmarine Squadron, which had been disbanded at RAF Podington. The squadron was equipped with modified B-24Ds that had been stripped of armament except for the tail turret. The aircraft were painted gloss black overall and the openings left by the removal of the gun turrets from their bellies were used by agents being dropped by parachute. In addition, plexiglass bubbles were added to the cockpit side windows to improve visibility for the pilots.

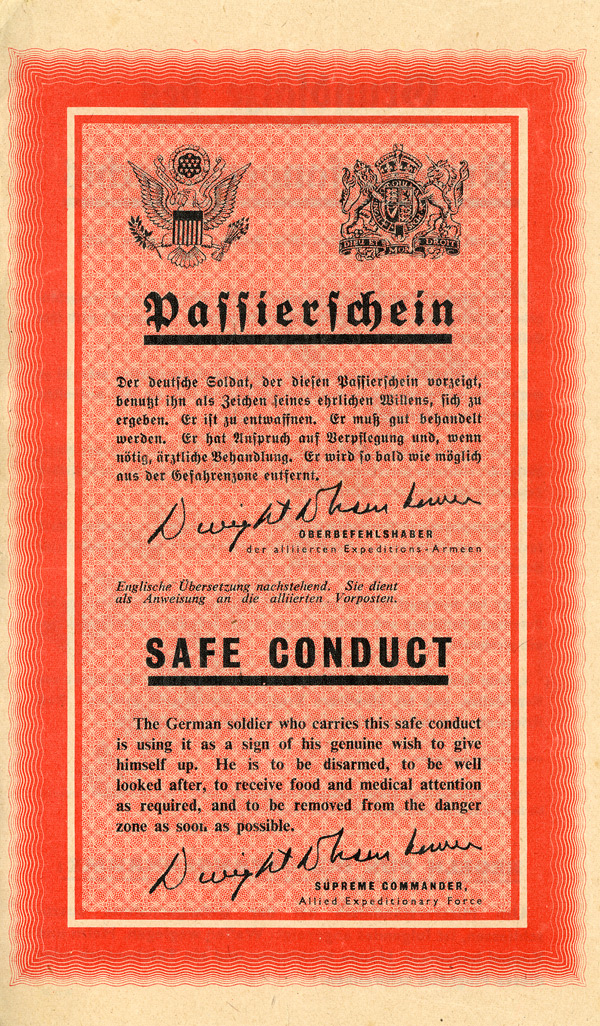
Safe conduct pass, probably the most successful Allied propaganda leaflet of the war

The unit flew its first Carpetbagger mission to drop supplies to members of the Resistance in Occupied Europe under the guidance of the Royal Air Force (RAF) in early January. In April the squadron moved to RAF Harrington, which was near RAF Tempsford, where the RAF was engaged in similar activities. Carpetbagger missions also began to include the infiltration of agents with most missions flown over occupied France and the low countries. In August 1944 the squadron transferred its personnel and equipment to the 858th Bombardment Squadron of the 492d Bombardment Group, which assumed the Carpetbagger mission.

When the 492d took over the Carpetbagger mission, its 858th Bombardment Squadron, which was engaged in psychological warfare against Nazi Germany, joined it at RAF Harrington. The 406th moved on paper to RAF Cheddington and took over the dozen Boeing B-17 Flying Fortresses of the 858th. These aircraft used laminated paper leaflet bombs that burst at one to two thousand feet above the ground and could accurately deliver 80,000 leaflets. As the squadron assumed its new mission in August 1944, the pace of missions accelerated to about eight per night. Squadron strength expanded to 24 aircraft and the B-17s were replaced by B-24s by the end of the year. The squadron flew these missions over France, Germany, Norway and the low countries. After the surrender of Germany in May 1945, the squadron continued flying missions for the Office of Strategic Services. Just under two billion leaflets were delivered by the night leaflet unit.

In July 1945, the unit returned to the United States, where it was redesignated as a very heavy bombardment squadron. The war in the Pacific Theater ended and the squadron was inactivated in October 1945.

=== Strategic Air Command ===
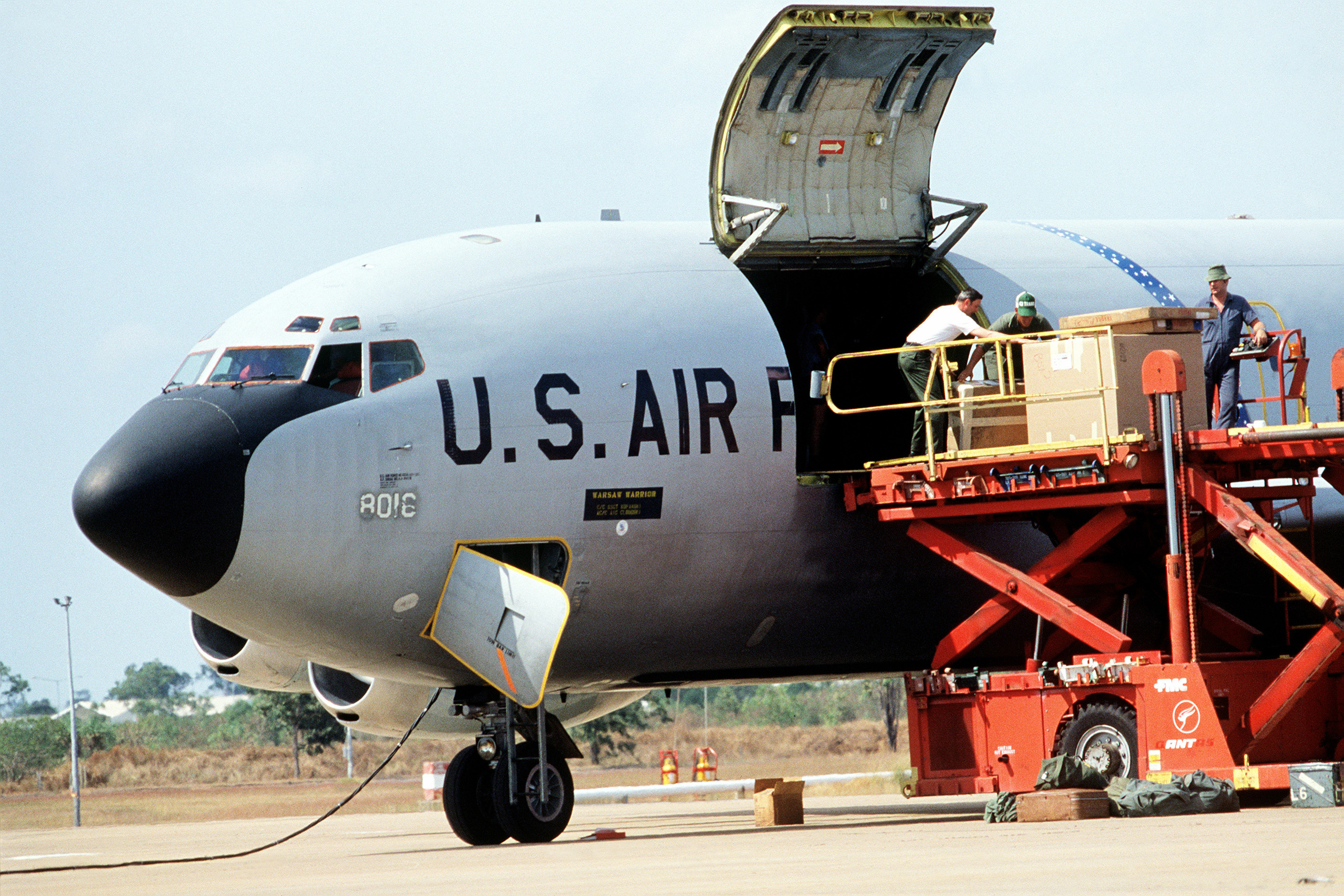
906th Air Refueling Squadron KC-135A on deployment to the Pacific in 1982

In 1959 the Air Force assigned the 906th Air Refueling Squadron to Strategic Air Command (SAC), which organized it at Minot Air Force Base, North Dakota in June, where it was assigned to the 4136th Strategic Wing. The 4136th wing was established by SAC in a program to disperse its Boeing B-52 Stratofortress bombers over a larger number of bases, thus making it more difficult for the Soviet Union to knock out the entire fleet with a surprise first strike. The squadron received its first Boeing KC-135 Stratotanker on 23 September 1959 and was judged to be combat ready on 31 October. Starting in 1960, one third of the squadron's aircraft were maintained on fifteen-minute alert, fully fueled and ready for combat to reduce vulnerability to a Soviet missile strike. This was increased to half the squadron's aircraft in 1962. The 4136th (and later the 450th and 5th wings) continued to maintain an alert commitment until the end of the Cold War. The 906th refueled B-52s participating in Operation Chrome Dome, the airborne component of SAC's alert force, until Chrome Dome was terminated in 1968. The squadron's ground alert commitment was increased in the fall of 1962 during the Cuban Missile Crisis, when all available aircraft assumed an alert status.

In February 1963, The 450th Bombardment Wing assumed the aircraft, personnel and equipment of the discontinued 4136th wing. The 4136th was a Major Command controlled (MAJCON) wing, which could not carry a permanent history or lineage, and SAC wanted to replace it with a permanent unit. The 906th was assigned to the newly activated 450th wing. In 1966 the squadron was awarded the Saunders Trophy for outstanding refueling operations.

In 1962, SAC organized four Post-Attack Command and Control System (PACCS) squadrons and equipped them with Boeing EB-47 Stratojets. The establishment of Boeing EC-135 airborne command post aircraft at SAC headquarters and at each of its Numbered Air Forces resulted in the inactivation of the less capable B-47 units by 1965. The communications relay mission of the B-47 units was assumed by the 906th and 28th Air Refueling Squadrons, which received a variety of EC-135s for this mission. By the mid-1960s, improved accuracy of Soviet ballistic missiles made underground Minuteman missile launch control centers more vulnerable, so the Airborne Launch Control System (ALCS) was created to provide a survivable launch capability. The ALCS was eventually installed aboard all PACCS aircraft assigned to the 906th. Launch crews came from the 91st Strategic Missile Wing. In April 1970, the squadron's ALCS aircraft were transferred to the new 4th Airborne Command and Control Squadron at Ellsworth Air Force Base.

The squadron deployed aircrews and aircraft to support the Spanish, Great Lakes and Alaskan Tanker Task Forces. It engaged in worldwide operations supporting combat operations in Southeast Asia from 1968 through 1975 through participation in Operation Young Tiger and support for Operation Arc Light. Afterwards it continued to support forward based tanker task forces. Due to normally supporting the European Tanker Task Force (ETTF) and Pacific Tanker Task Force (PTTF) simultaneously along with home operations, it adopted the slogan "The sun never sets on the 906th". It supported combat operations in Southwest Asia from 1990 through 1991.

=== Air Mobility Command ===
In 1992 the air force reorganized its major commands. As a result, the 906th's parent 5th Operations Group was reassigned to Air Combat Command as a bomber unit, while the 906th became an element of Air Mobility Command (AMC) and was assigned as a geographically separated unit to the 43d Operations Group at Malmstrom Air Force Base. During this time, the squadron included not just the normal operations personnel, but also maintenance and other support personnel. For 1992 and 1993, the squadron maintainers were recognized as the Best AMU (Aircraft Maintenance Unit) in all of AMC. In December of 1992, they received a no-notice tasking to deploy to Lajes Field, Azores, Portugal, and departed organically (no other airlift support) within 24 hours. At Lajes they were the lead unit along with KC-135As from K.I. Sawyer AFB, MI. They were part of Operation Restore Hope supporting humanitarian efforts in Somalia, enabling US-based airlifters to deliver supplies more efficiently. During 1993, they converted operations from the KC-135A to the KC-135R. From January to March 1994, they deployed to Riyadh, Saudi Arabia in support of Operation Southern Watch. While deployed, the squadron flag was reassigned and they became Detachment 1, 43d Operations Group until transfer of all personnel and aircraft out of Minot later in 1994. The squadron was assigned to the 319th Air Refueling Wing one of three "super tanker wings" at Grand Forks Air Force Base, North Dakota, where it became the second of four tanker squadrons assigned to the wing's 319th Operations Group.

Under AMC control, the unit supported Operation Deny Flight, the United Nations no-fly zone over Bosnia and Herzegovina in 1994 and 1995 from Pisa Airport, Italy and Istres Air Base, France. It supported Operation Uphold Democracy, the United Nations action to remove the military junta and restore the elected president of Haiti in 1995. In 1996 the squadron deployed planes and crews to Riyadh Air Base, Saudi Arabia for Operation Southern Watch, the Southwest Asia Task Force operation to monitor and control airspace in southern Iraq. It also deployed for the sister operation patrolling northern Iraq, Operation Northern Watch.

For three months in the summer of 2000, the squadron was forced to operate from MacDill Air Force Base, Florida as the Grand Forks runways underwent a nine million dollar renovation. For the first time in ten years, following the 9/11 attacks, the squadron once again placed aircraft on alert as part of Operation Noble Eagle and also began support for Operation Enduring Freedom in Afghanistan. Toward the end of the following year, the squadron began to deploy forward in what became Operation Iraqi Freedom, the war in Iraq.

AMC began to prepare for the end of air refueling operations at Grand Forks in preparation for the arrival of Global Hawk unmanned aircraft. As a result, it began to inactivate or transfer the tanker squadrons stationed there. On 2 October 2009 the 906th moved without personnel or equipment from Grand Forks Air Force Base to Scott Air Force Base, Illinois, where it was assigned to the 375th Air Mobility Wing as an active associate unit with the 126th Air Refueling Wing of the Illinois Air National Guard. The 375th maintains administrative control of the squadron, while the 126th has operational control. The airmen of the 906th operate and maintain the aircraft of the 126th wing's 108th Air Refueling Squadron.

== Lineage ==
406th Bombardment Squadron

- Constituted as the 16th Reconnaissance Squadron (Medium) on 20 November 1940

Activated on 15 January 1941
Redesignated 406th Bombardment Squadron (Medium) on 22 April 1942
Redesignated 406th Bombardment Squadron, Medium on 1 June 1943
Redesignated 406th Bombardment Squadron (Heavy) on 2 November 1943
Redesignated 406th Bombardment Squadron, Heavy on 20 August 1943
Redesignated 406th Bombardment Squadron, Very Heavy on 5 August 1945

- Inactivated on 17 October 1945
- Consolidated with the 906th Air Refueling Squadron on 19 September 1985 as the 906th Air Refueling Squadron

906th Air Refueling Squadron

- Constituted as the 906th Air Refueling Squadron, Heavy on 9 March 1959

Activated on 1 June 1959

- Consolidated with the 406th Bombardment Squadron on 19 September 1985

Redesignated 906th Air Refueling Squadron on 1 September 1991

=== Assignments ===
- 3d Bombardment Wing, 15 January 1941 (attached to 42d Bombardment Group)
- 42d Bombardment Group, 25 February 1942 (attached to 28th Composite Group after c. 6 June 1942)
- 41st Bombardment Group, 12 February 1943 (remained attached to 28th Composite Group)
- Fourth Air Force, 11 October 1943
- Eighth Air Force, 2 November 1943
- 1st Bombardment Division, 21 November 1943 (attached to 482d Bombardment Group, 4 December 1943 – 21 February 1944)
- VIII Air Force Composite Command, 26 February 1944 (attached to 328th Service Group 27 February 1944 – 28 March 1944, then to 801st Bombardment Group (Provisional), until 5 August 1944)
- VIII Fighter Command, 1 October 1944
- 1st Air Division, 30 December 1944
- 492d Bombardment Group, 5 August 1945 – 17 October 1945
- 4136th Strategic Wing, 1 June 1959
- 450th Bombardment Wing, 1 February 1963
- 5th Bombardment Wing, 25 July 1968
- 5th Operations Group, 1 September 1991
- 43d Operations Group, 1 June 1992
- 319th Operations Group, 30 January 1994
- 375th Operations Group, 2 October 2009 – Present

=== Stations ===
- Fort Douglas, Utah, 15 January 1941
- Gowen Field, Idaho, 4 June 1941

Air echelon operated from Paine Field, Washington, from 8 December 1941

- Paine Field, Washington, 21 January 1942
- Portland Army Air Base, Oregon, 20 July 1942 – 1 November 1942

Air echelon operated from Elmendorf Field, Alaska Territory, from 7 June 1942

- Elmendorf Field, Alaska Territory, 15 November 1942 – 18 October 1943

Operated from Adak Army Air Field, Aleutians, Alaska Territory 25 July 1943
Operated from Amchitka Army Airfield, Metlakatla, Annette Island, Alaska Territory, 13 August – c. October 1943

- Portland Army Air Base, Oregon, 23 October 1943 – 2 November 1943
- RAF Alconbury (Station 102), England, 11 November 1943
- RAF Watton (Station 376), England, 7 February 1944
- RAF Harrington (Station 113), England, 1 April 1944
- RAF Cheddington (Station 113), England, 10 August 1944
- RAF Harrington, England (Station 179), 16 March 1945 – 6 August 1945
- Sioux Falls Army Air Field, South Dakota, 14 August 1945
- Kirtland Field, New Mexico, 17 August 1945 – 17 October 1945
- Minot Air Force Base, North Dakota, 1 June 1959
- Grand Forks Air Force Base, North Dakota, 30 January 1994
- Scott Air Force Base, Illinois, 1 October 2009 – present

=== Aircraft ===
- Douglas B-18 Bolo (1941–1943)
- Martin B-26 Marauder (1941–1942)
- Lockheed A-29 Hudson (1942–1943)
- North American B-25 Mitchell (1943)
- Consolidated B-24 Liberator (1943–1945)
- Boeing B-17 Flying Fortress (1944–1945)
- Boeing KC-135A Stratotanker (1959–1993)
- Boeing EC-135 (c. 1966–1970)
- Boeing KC-135R Stratotanker (1993–present)

=== Awards and campaigns ===
Award streamer	Award	Dates	Notes
	Air Force Outstanding Unit Award	1 July 1977 – 30 June 1979	906th Air Refueling Squadron
	Air Force Outstanding Unit Award	1 July 1983 – 30 June 1984	906th Air Refueling Squadron
	Air Force Outstanding Unit Award	1 July 1984 – 30 June 1985	906th Air Refueling Squadron
	Air Force Outstanding Unit Award	1 July 1985 – 30 June 1986	906th Air Refueling Squadron
	Air Force Outstanding Unit Award	1 July 1991 – 31 May 1992	906th Air Refueling Squadron
	Air Force Outstanding Unit Award	1 June 1992 – 30 June 1993	906th Air Refueling Squadron
	Air Force Outstanding Unit Award	1 October 1993 – 30 June 1995	906th Air Refueling Squadron
	Air Force Outstanding Unit Award	1 July 1995 – 30 June 1997	906th Air Refueling Squadron
	Air Force Outstanding Unit Award	1 July 2000 – 30 June 2002	906th Air Refueling Squadron
	Air Force Outstanding Unit Award	1 July 2002 – 30 June 2004	906th Air Refueling Squadron
	Air Force Outstanding Unit Award	1 July 2004 – 30 June 2005	906th Air Refueling Squadron
	Air Force Outstanding Unit Award	1 July 2005 – 30 June 2006	906th Air Refueling Squadron
	Air Force Outstanding Unit Award	1 July 2006 – 30 June 2007	906th Air Refueling Squadron
	Air Force Outstanding Unit Award	1 July 2007 – 19 June 2009	906th Air Refueling Squadron
	Air Force Outstanding Unit Award	1 October 2009 – 31 August 2011	906th Air Refueling Squadron
	French Croix de Guerre with Palm	none given	406th Bombardment Squadron

Campaign Streamer	Campaign	Dates	Notes
	Antisubmarine	7 December 1941 – 6 May 1942	16th Reconnaissance Squadron (later 406th Bombardment Squadron
	Aleutian Islands	7 June 1942 – 24 August 1943	406th Bombardment Squadron
	Air Combat, Asiatic-Pacific Theater	7 June 1942 – October 1943	406th Bombardment Squadron
	Air Offensive, Europe	11 November 1943 – 5 June 1944	406th Bombardment Squadron
	Normandy	6 June 1944 – 24 July 1944	406th Bombardment Squadron
	Northern France	25 July 1944 – 14 September 1944	406th Bombardment Squadron
	Rhineland	15 September 1944 – 21 March 1945	406th Bombardment Squadron
	Central Europe	22 March 1944 – 21 May 1945	406th Bombardment Squadron

== See also ==
- List of United States Air Force air refueling squadrons
- List of Martin B-26 Marauder operators
- B-17 Flying Fortress units of the United States Army Air Forces
- B-24 Liberator units of the United States Army Air Forces
