= Operation Carpetbagger =

1944–45 US air supply of European resistance fighters in WWII

801 BG emblem.

Operation Carpetbagger was a World War II operation to provide aerial supply of weapons and other matériel to resistance fighters in France, Italy and the Low Countries by the U.S. Army Air Forces that began on 4 January 1944.

== History ==
In late 1943, the 22d Antisubmarine Squadron of the Eighth Air Force was disbanded at RAF Alconbury and its aircraft used to form the 36th and 406th Bombardment Squadrons under the 482nd bomb group. After some shuffling of commands, these two squadrons were placed under the provisional 801st Bomb Group at RAF Tempsford at the beginning of 1944 and the first "Carpetbagger" missions were carried out at 5 January by this unit under the control of General "Wild Bill" Donovan's Office of Strategic Services (OSS). The last Tempsford sortie is registered as of 15 March 1944.

In 5 April 1944, the group was moved to RAF Harrington (Station 179), (and the first 17 sorties done) a more secluded and thus more secure airbase. A month later, in advance of the expected invasion of Europe, it was expanded to four squadrons to increase its capabilities and to pick up workload from RAF Bomber Command; the two new squadrons were the 788th and 850th Bombardment Squadrons.

The Group had already adopted the nickname of "Carpetbaggers" from its original operational codename. In August 1944, the group dropped the "Provisional" status and absorbed the names of the 492d Bombardment Group from RAF North Pickenham, which had stood down after severe losses in its initial operations but stayed at Harrington; its squadrons became the 856th, 857th, 858th and 859th Bomb Squadrons. From January 1944 to the end of the war, the Group, in liaison with the British Special Operations Executive and later the Special Forces Headquarters (SFHQ) in London, dropped spies and supplies to the resistance forces of France, Belgium, the Netherlands, Denmark and Norway.

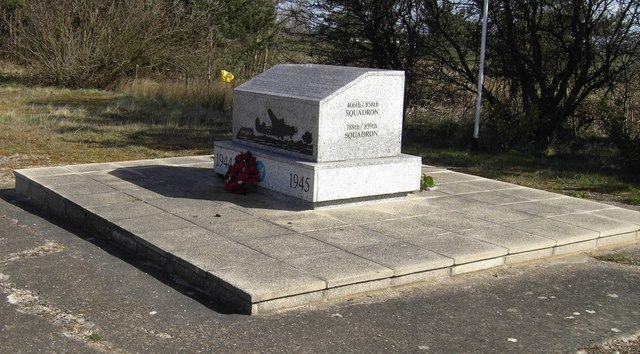
Carpetbaggers Memorial at RAF Harrington

During a hiatus in operations from mid-September 1944 to the end of 1944, the Group ferried gasoline to depots on the Continent for two weeks to supply advancing Allied armies, then three squadrons went into training for night bombing operations, whilst the 856th participated in the return of Allied airmen on the Continent who had either evaded capture or had walked out of Switzerland after that country relaxed its internment practices. This exercise was carried out mostly in Douglas C-47 Skytrains assigned to the group originally for insertion operations during the previous summer.

In December 1944, the 859th was sent on Detached Service with the Fifteenth Air Force in the Mediterranean Theater of Operations with the 2641st Special Group (Provisional) at Brindisi, Italy. The 856th Bomb Squadron, after completing the personnel recovery mission, resumed Carpetbagger operations on a limited basis during the bad weather of the winter of 1945, while the remaining two squadrons (the 857th and 858th) participated in medium altitude bombing from late December 1944 through March 1945.

In the spring of 1945, Carpetbagger operations resumed but not to the extent of the previous year. The 857th was detached and sent to RAF Bassingbourn (91st Bomb Group) at the end of March 1945, while the 856th and 858th dropped small numbers of agents and sabotage teams into the Netherlands, Denmark, Norway and Germany. Operations came to an end at Harrington at the end of April 1945, though a few special OSS missions, such as returning dignitaries to formerly occupied countries, carried on until the Group disbanded and returned to the United States in early July 1945.

== Operations ==
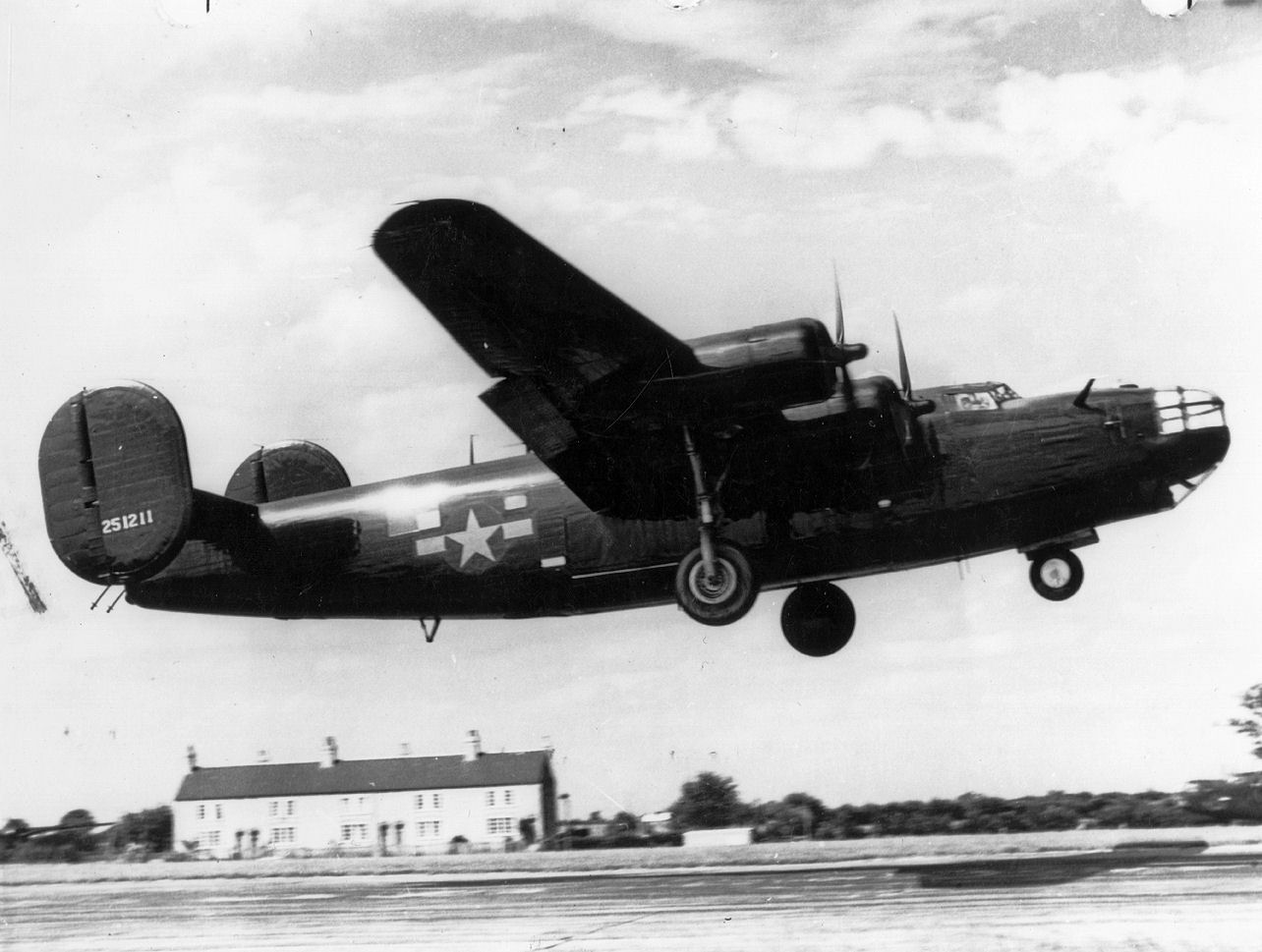
A 492d Bombardment Group B-24 in black livery.

The B-24 Liberator bombers used for the flights were modified by removing the belly turret, nose guns and any equipment unnecessary for the mission, such as oxygen equipment, in order to lighten them and provide more cargo space and speed. The rear guns were kept as protection from night fighters. Agents and crated supplies were dropped by parachute through the opening left by removal of the belly turret. In addition, supplies were loaded into containers designed to fit inside the bomb-bay and released from there by the existing equipment. Targets were given by exact longitudes and latitudes, thus making precise navigation imperative.

All flights were made on moonlit nights so that visual navigation could be made by using rivers, lakes, railroad tracks, and towns as check points. The pilot, copilot, and bombardier all had maps to aid them in keeping track of their location, whilst the navigator kept position by dead reckoning, with all four of these officers staying in close interphone contact.

All flights were individual, each navigator choosing his route in consultation with the pilot. On flights to French targets the aircraft crossed the coast at around 6,000 feet (1,800 m) to avoid light anti-aircraft fire, dropping to 500 feet (150 m) or so to avoid night fighters once inland and to make it possible to verify location, assuring that checkpoints on the ground corresponded exactly to the area being looked at in the cockpit and nose of the aircraft. Limited visibility at higher altitude would make this more difficult if not impossible. Since drops were made at 400–500 feet (120–150 m) at the pilot's discretion, being already at such a height made the drops more efficient.

When only a few miles from the target area, all available eyes began searching for the drop area, which would usually be identified by three high-powered flashlights placed in a row, with a fourth at a 90-degree angle to indicate the direction of the drop. Coming towards the target, the aircraft slowed to between 120–125 miles per hour (190–200 km/h) and dropped to an altitude of 400 feet (120 m), higher in hilly country: agents were dropped first, with supplies on a second drop. Often, pilots had to fly several miles farther into enemy territory after completing their drops to disguise the actual drop location should any enemy observers recognize the aircraft's turning point as the drop location. In some cases multiple drops in isolated areas were made at different intervals and bonfires would be used as drop indicators instead of flashlights. In rare cases air-to-ground oral radio contact would be made, these being of great importance.

== After the war ==
The group has been generally recognized as the ancestor of today's Air Force Special Operations.
