= 492nd Special Operations Wing =

492nd Special Operations Wing

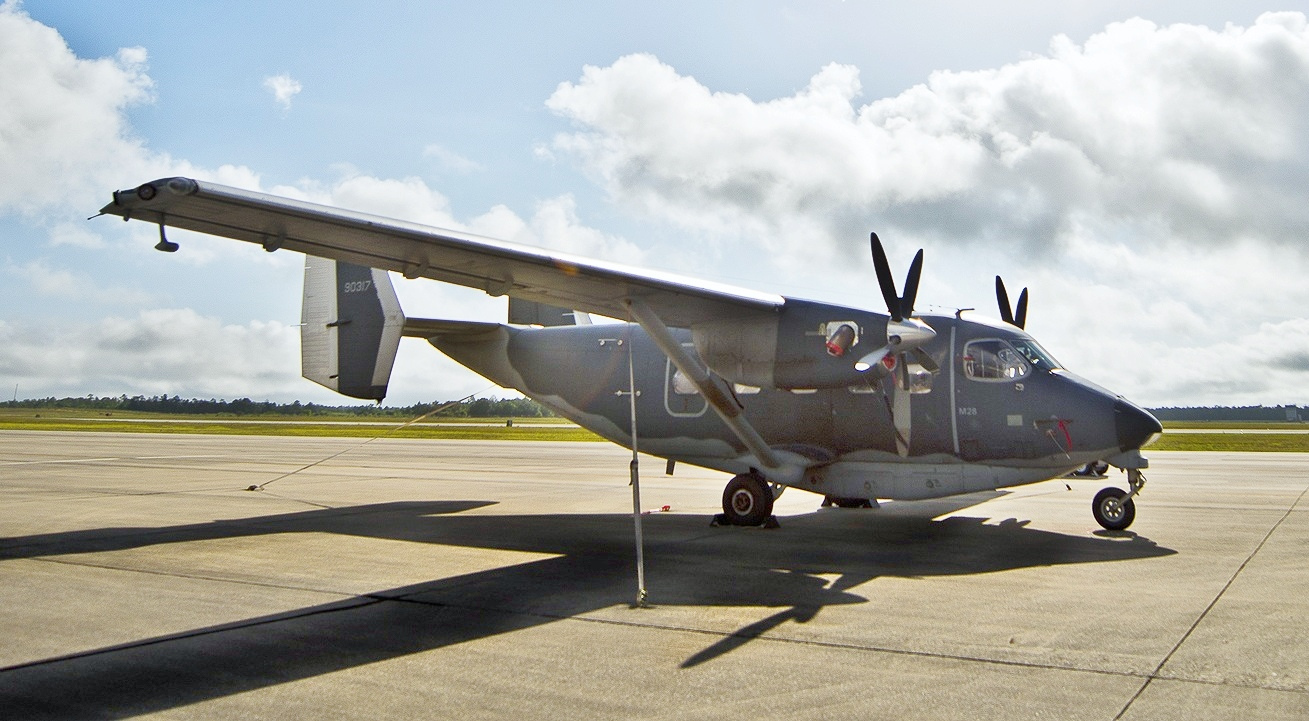
- PZL C-145A flown by the 6th Special Operations Squadron
- Active: 1943–1945; 2003; 2017–present
- Country: United States
- Branch: United States Air Force
- Role: Special operations
- Engagements: European Theater of Operations
- Decorations: Distinguished Unit Citation; French Croix de Guerre with Palm

Commanders
- Wing Commander: Col. Zach Blom
- Deputy wing commander: Col. Patrick J. DuBe
- Command Chief: Command Chief Master Sergeant Thomas J. Gunnell

Insignia
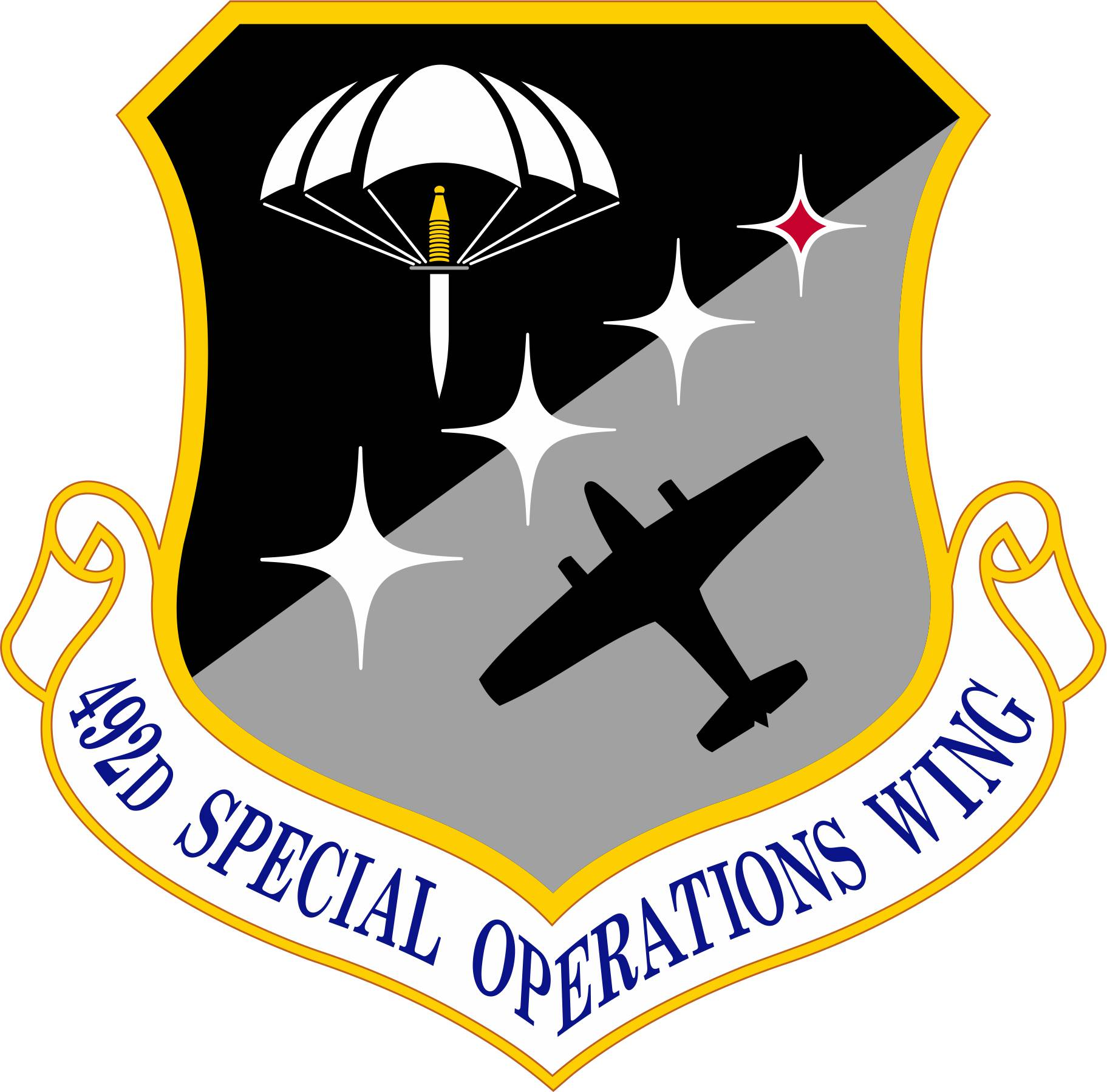
- 492nd Special Operations Wing emblem (Note: Approved 13 July 2017.)

The 492nd Special Operations Wing is a United States Air Forces unit stationed at Hurlburt Field, Florida. It was activated in May 2017 to replace the Air Force Special Operations Air Warfare Center.

During World War II the unit entered combat in May 1944, and sustained the heaviest losses of any Consolidated B-24 Liberator group for a three-month period. The group was withdrawn from combat with its personnel and equipment being reassigned to other units. The 801st Bombardment Group (Provisional) was replaced by the 492nd Bombardment Group, and the group performed special operations missions throughout the remainder of the war in Europe. It was inactivated on 17 October 1945.

In June 2017 official USAF descriptions said that the wing organized, trained and equipped forces to conduct special operations missions. It led Major Command irregular warfare activities and executes special operations test and evaluation programs. It also developed doctrine, tactics, techniques and procedures for United States Air Force special operations forces.

== History ==
=== World War II ===
==== Bombardment training ====
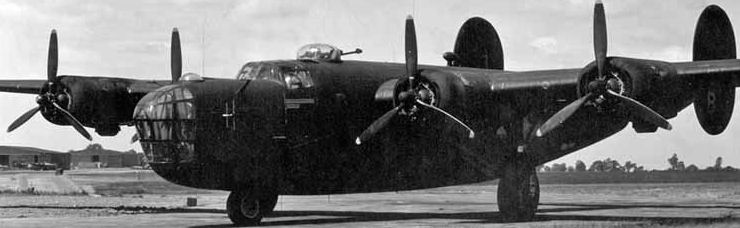
858th Squadron B-24D Liberator used during training (Note: Aircraft is Consolidated B-24D-65-CO Liberator serial 42-40509, nicknamed Cookie. This airplane was lost in an accident on 7 October 1943.)

The group was established in October 1943 at Alamogordo Army Air Field, New Mexico (Note: Freeman says the group was organized at Clovis Army Air Field, New Mexico and did not move to Alamogordo until November. Freeman, p. 262. Maurer and Haulman both give Alamogordo as the organization station.) as a Consolidated B-24 Liberator heavy bomber unit, drawing its cadre from the 859th Bombardment Squadron, a former antisubmarine squadron located at Blythe Army Air Base, California. Its other original squadrons were the 856th, 857th and 858th Bombardment Squadrons. In December, the 859th moved from Blythe to join group headquarters and the other three squadrons. The 492nd was one of seven heavy bombardment groups (Note: The others were the 488th, 489th, 491st, 493rd and 494th Bombardment Groups.) activated in the autumn of 1943. These were to be the last Army Air Forces heavy bomb groups established.

The group air echelon trained for combat at Alamogordo until April 1944, although the ground echelons of its four squadrons were withdrawn to form other bomber units. New ground elements were organized from other groups of the 2nd Bombardment Division already in theater. The group's air echelon departed for England on 1 April, flying the South Atlantic ferrying route through South America and Africa. Only about 120 members of the group's ground echelon shipped overseas, however, leaving New Mexico on 11 April and sailing on the RMS Queen Elizabeth on 20 April.

==== Bombardment operations ====
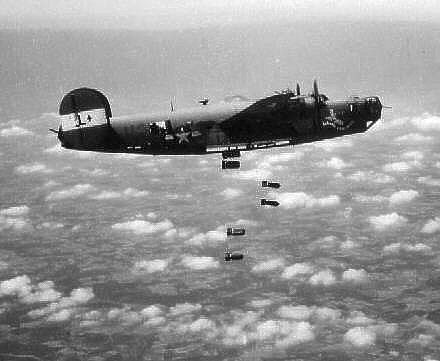
Group B-24 on a mission over Nazi Occupied Europe.

The group was the first in VIII Bomber Command group to arrive with aircraft in natural metal finish on all their aircraft. On 14 April, the ground echelon that had been formed in England arrived at RAF North Pickenham (Note: Although North Pickenham had been the squadrons' nominal station since 1 January, it was actually being assembled at other 2nd Bombardment Division stations. Freeman, p. 262.) The air echelon began arriving on 18 April.

The 492nd entered combat on 11 May 1944, operating primarily against industrial targets in central Germany. During the first week in June, the group was diverted from strategic targets to support Operation Overlord, the invasion of Normandy by attacking airfields and V-weapon launching sites in France. On D-Day it bombed coastal defenses in Normandy and attacked bridges, railroads, and other interdiction targets in France until the middle of the month. The group resumed bombardment of strategic targets in Germany and, except for support of the infantry during Operation Cobra the Saint-Lô breakthrough on 25 July 1944, and continued these operations until August 1944. However, during its three months of strategic operations the 492nd Group suffered the heaviest losses of any Eighth Air Force group. The group's heavy losses had begun with one of the group's earliest missions, an attack on Braunschweig, in which it lost eight Liberators to enemy interceptors. When the 492nd Group returned to strategic operation, on 20 June Luftwaffe fighters, primarily Messerschmitt Bf 110s, using air to air rockets shot down fourteen of the 492nd Group's B-24s, the equivalent of losing an entire squadron on one raid. Heavy losses, this time to fighters from Jagdgeschwader 3, were again suffered on 29 June. (Note: Superstitious persons speculated that the hard luck group reputation had passed from the 44th Bombardment Group to the 392nd Bombardment Group and it was now resting on the 492nd Group. Freeman, p. 160. Others speculated that the Luftwaffe was concentrating on the 492nd Group because it was the first Liberator group to arrive in the theater with uncamouflaged B-24s. However, other groups were receiving uncamouflaged planes to replace their losses. Postwar review of Luftwaffe records does not support the theory that the Luftwaffe singled out any unit for particular attention. However, Luftwaffe fighter controllers, naturally, directed fighters to what they perceived as the most vulnerable portions of the American bomber formations, a position that the 492nd Group seems to have occupied a disproportionate number of times. Freeman, p. 172.) After only 89 days of combat, the 492nd had lost 52 aircraft to enemy action, with 588 men killed or missing. In the words of one veteran, "the whole group was wiped out". On 5 August, the decision was made to withdraw the 492nd Group from combat. Rather than try to rebuild the shattered group, the group was stood down and the surviving members were reassigned to other units in theater.

==== Special operations (Operation Carpetbagger) ====
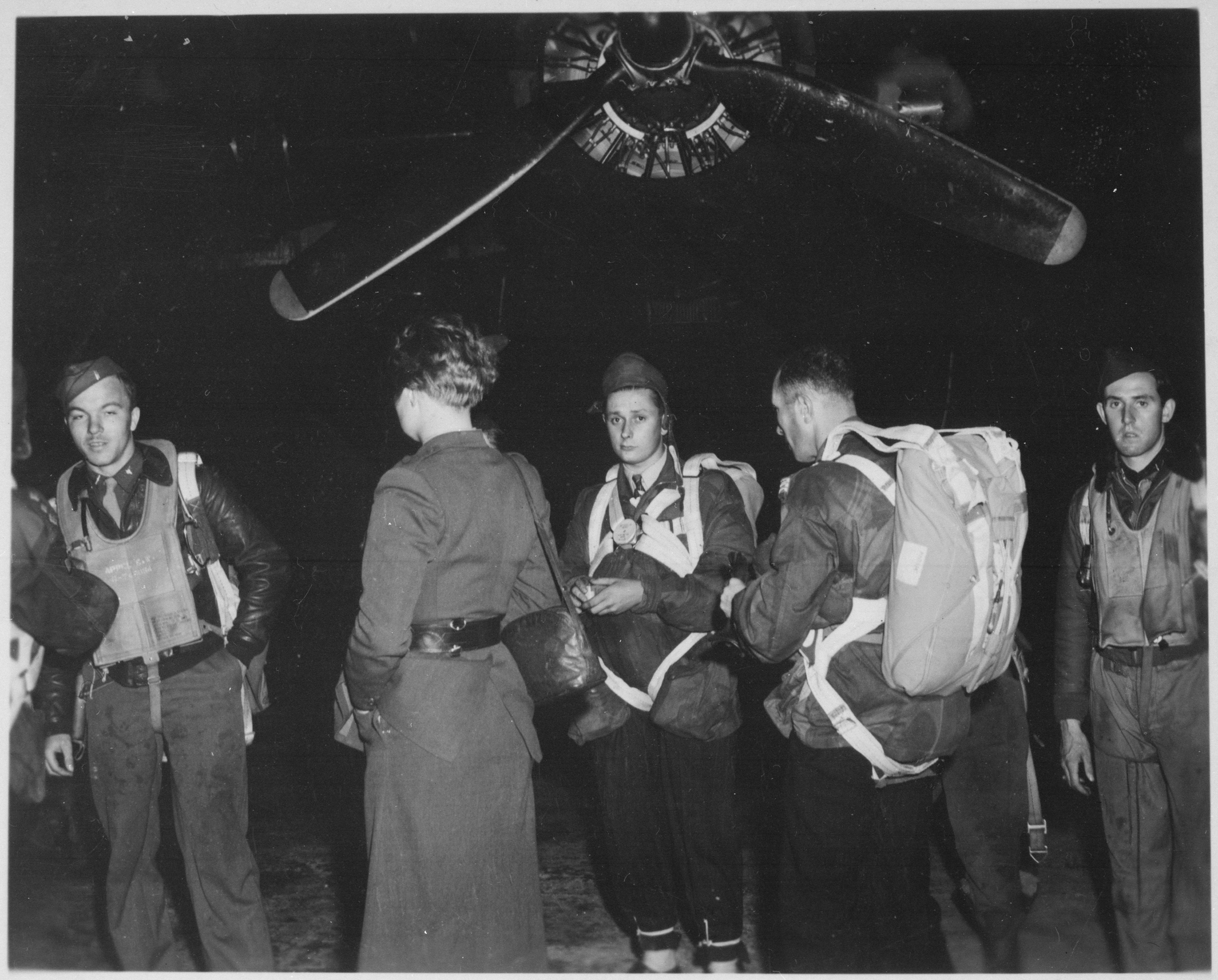
Jedburghs in front of a B-24 before takeoff from Harrington.)

Subsequently, the 492nd was transferred without personnel or equipment, to RAF Harrington on 5 August 1944 and assumed the personnel, equipment, and the Carpetbagger special operations mission of the 801st Bombardment Group (Provisional) that was discontinued. With black-painted aircraft configured with engine flame dampers and optimized for night operations, the group operated chiefly over southern France with B-24's and C-47's, transporting agents, supplies, and propaganda leaflets to patriots. The liberation of most of France and Belgium brought an effective end to these missions on 16 September 1944.<ref.Warren, p. 63/> The group's aircraft were used to transport fuel and other supplies to the US Third Army in France, whose advance had outpaced its supply base. This operation resulted in the aircraft carrying 80 octane fuel in their wing fuel tanks, and having it pumped out to waiting storage tanks and tanker trucks at the advanced airfields in France. Unfortunately, the 80 octane fuel resulted in the wing tanks being chemically degraded so that they could no longer carry aviation fuel. This drastically decreased the range of the aircraft. It being too expensive to change out the wing tanks, the aircraft were flown to a depot area and the entire group was issued new B-24 aircraft. In December 1944, the 859th Squadron was detached to the Mediterranean Theater of Operations, where it supported guerilla operations.

Throughout 1944 the group's missions intermittently included attacks on airfields, oil refineries, seaports, and other targets in France, the Netherlands and Germany. These operations continued until February 1945. In addition, in October 1944 the group began training for night bombardment operations. These operations concentrated on marshaling yards and goods depots in Germany, which the group undertook from February through March 1945. In September 1944 until mid winter 1945 a small detachment of men from the group, mainly from the 856th Bombardment squadron, was sent on a personnel recovery mission in Southeast France near the Swiss border to recover USAAF crews who had been interned in Switzerland that had started coming across the border into France to the American Lines during the Invasion of Southern France.

Two of the Squadrons continued night bombardment missions into 1945. The main OSS/Carpetbagger operations over Germany and German-occupied territory had been handed over to the 856th Bombardment Squadron from the 25th Bombardment Group, which used B-24, A-26, and British Mosquito aircraft for "Red Stocking" missions to drop leaflets, demolition equipment, and agents. The 856th Squadron received a Distinguished Unit Citation for operations during March and April 1945, performed at night despite adverse weather and vigorous opposition from enemy ground forces. It was also cited by the French government for similar operations over France in 1944. It flew its last Carpetbagger mission in April 1945 and then ferried personnel and equipment to and from the Continent until July.

The group left England in July 1945 and was stationed at Kirtland Field, New Mexico in August. The group became a very heavy bomb group on arrival at Kirtland. The 492nd was programmed for Boeing B-29 Superfortress operations in the Pacific, but apparently was not equipped when Japan surrendered. It was inactivated on 17 October 1945.

=== Expeditionary unit ===
In June 2002, the group was converted to provisional status as the 492nd Air Expeditionary Group and assigned to Air Mobility Command (AMC) to activate or inactivate as needed for contingency operations. AMC activated the unit once, at Lajes Field in the Azores from March through May 2003 during the 2003 invasion of Iraq.

=== Return to special operations ===
In May 2017, the group was withdrawn from provisional status and returned to its old designation for one day. It became the 492nd Special Operations Wing and was activated on 17 May at Hurlburt Field, Florida, where it replaced the Air Force Special Operations Air Warfare Center.

In addition to its assigned units, the wing is responsible for the training of two Air National Guard squadrons, the 209th Special Operations Civil Engineer Squadron and the 280th Combat Communications Squadron.

== Lineage ==
- Constituted as the 492nd Bombardment Group (Heavy) on 14 September 1943

Activated on 1 October 1943

- Redesignated 492nd Bombardment Group, Heavy on 20 August 1944

Redesignated 492nd Bombardment Group, Very Heavy on 17 August 1945
Inactivated on 17 October 1945

- Redesignated 492nd Air Expeditionary Group and converted to provisional status on 12 June 2002

Activated on 1 March 2003
Inactivated on 27 May 2003

- Withdrawn from provisional status and redesignated 492nd Bombardment Group, Very Heavy on 3 May 2017
- Redesignated 492nd Special Operations Wing on 4 May 2017

Activated on 10 May 2017

=== Assignments ===
- Second Air Force, 1 October 1943
- Eighth Air Force, April 1944
- VIII Bomber Command, April 1944
- 2nd Bombardment Division, April 1944
- VIII Air Force Composite Command, c. 10 August 1944
- VIII Fighter Command, 1 October 1944
- 1st Bombardment Division (later 1st Air Division), c. 22 October 1944
- Second Air Force, c. 14 August–17 October 1945
- Air Mobility Command 12 June 2002 – 3 May 2017

Attached to Twenty-First Air Force, 1 March–27 May 2003

- Air Force Special Operations Command, 17 May 2017 – present

=== Components ===
==== Groups ====
- 492nd Special Operations Group, 17 May 2017 – present
- 492nd Special Operations Training Group, 17 May 2017 – present

==== Squadrons ====
- 6th Special Operations Squadron: 10 May 2017 – October 2022.
- 17th Special Operations Squadron, c. 2023 – present, at Will Rogers Field
- 18th Special Operations Test and Evaluation Squadron ?? - present
- 19th Special Operations Squadron: unknown – present
- 406th Bombardment Squadron: 5 August – 17 October 1945
- 524th Special Operations Squadron
- 551st Special Operations Squadron: unknown - present
- 856th Bombardment Squadron: 1 October 1943 – 17 October 1945
- 857th Bombardment Squadron: 1 October 1943 – 17 October 1945 (attached to 1st Air Division 10 March–c. August 1945)
- 858th Bombardment Squadron: 1 October 1943 – 19 June 1944; 5 August 1944 – 17 October 1945
- 859th Bombardment Squadron: 1 October 1943 – 14 August 1945 (attached to 15th Special Group (Provisional) (later 2641st Special Group [Provisional]) after 17 December 1944)
- 6th Special Operations Aircraft Maintenance Squadron: 8 July 2024 - 16 August 2025

=== Stations ===
- Alamogordo Army Air Field, New Mexico, 1 October 1943 – April 1944
- RAF North Pickenham (AAF-143), England, 18 April 1944 (air echelon), 28 April 1944 (ground echelon)
- RAF Harrington (AAF-179), England, c. 10 August 1944 – July 1945
- Sioux Falls Army Air Field, South Dakota, 14 August 1945
- Kirtland Field, New Mexico, 17 August–17 October 1945
- Lajes Field, Azores, 1 March–27 May 2003
- Hurlburt Field, Florida, 10 May 2017 – present

=== Aircraft ===
- Consolidated B-24 Liberator, 1943–1945
- Douglas C-47 Skytrain, 1944–1945
- Douglas A-26 Invader, 1945
- de Havilland Mosquito, 1945
- Lockheed Martin MC-130J Commando II, 2024-present
