= RAF Harrington =

Former Royal Air Force station

RAF Harrington USAAF Station 179
- Kettering, Northamptonshire in England
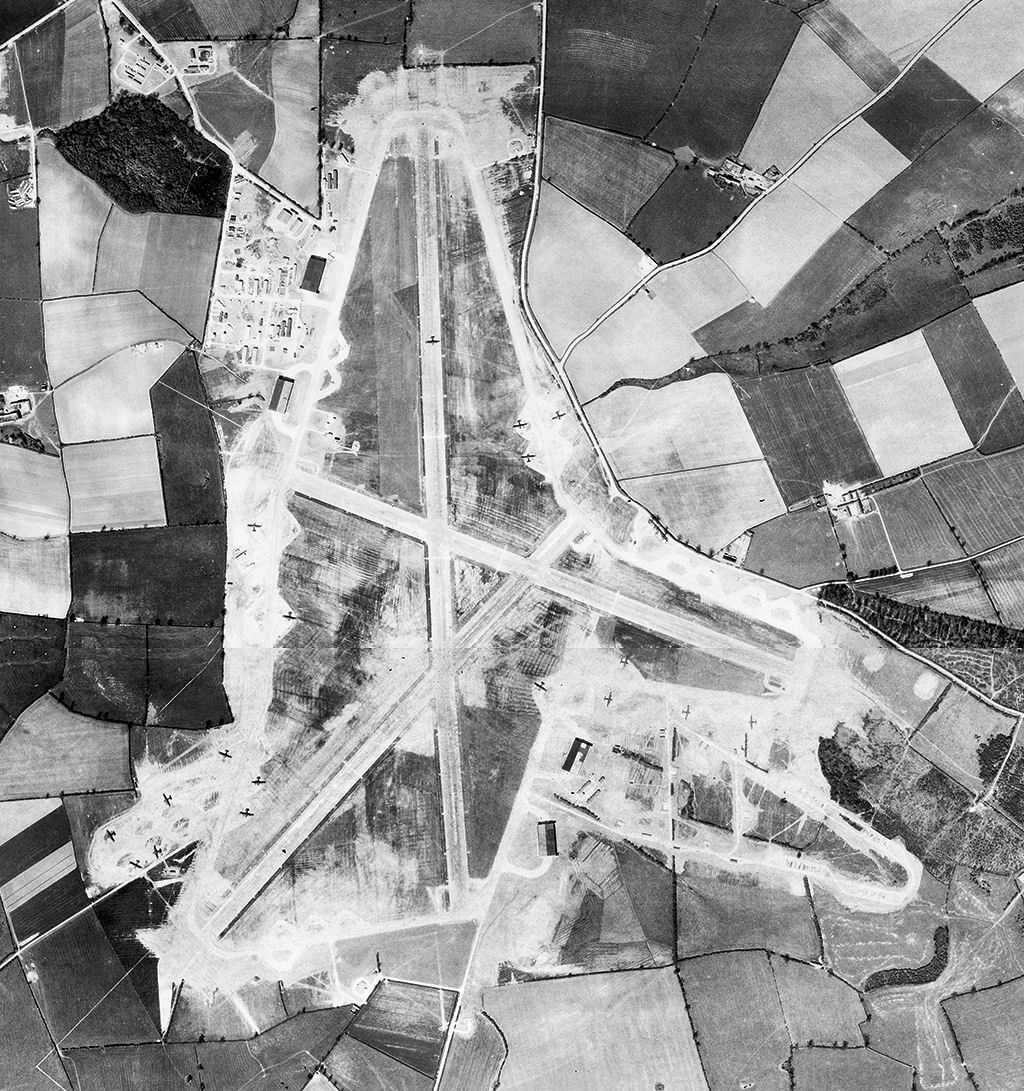
- Aerial photograph of Harrington airfield looking north, the main runway runs vertically, 22 April 1944. Note the many aircraft of the 801st Bombardment Group on the various hardstands, also one appearing to be taking off on the main runway.

Site information
- Type: Royal Air Force station
- Code: HR
- Owner: Ministry of Defence
- Operator: Royal Air Force; United States Army Air Forces
- Controlled by: RAF Bomber Command * No. 92 (OTU) Group RAF; Eighth Air Force

Location
- Shown within Northamptonshire RAF Harrington (the United Kingdom)
- Coordinates: 52°23′34″N 000°51′43″W

Site history
- Built: 1943
- Built by: 826th & 852nd Engineer Battalions, US Army
- In use: 9 November 1943 – 1945, 1958 – 23 January 1963
- Battles/wars: European theatre of World War II; Cold War

Airfield information
- Elevation: 158 metres (518 ft) AMSL
Runways
Direction	Length and surface
00/18	1,830 metres (6,004 ft) Concrete
05/23	1,280 metres (4,199 ft) Concrete
12/30	1,280 metres (4,199 ft) Concrete

Royal Air Force Harrington or more simply RAF Harrington is a former Royal Air Force station in England about 5.6 miles (9.0 km) west of Kettering in Northamptonshire south of the village of Harrington off the A14 road. During the early Cold War it was a Thor missile site, designed to deliver atomic warheads to the Soviet Union. The nuclear missile site is now protected as a Grade II listed building as an example of Cold War architecture.

== History ==
=== United States Army Air Forces use ===
The airfield was opened in September 1943 and was originally planned as a satellite for No. 84 Operational Training Unit RAF at RAF Desborough. The airfield, intended for heavy bomber use, was built by 826th and 852nd Engineer Battalions of the US Army and was completed in the spring of 1944.

Harrington was allocated to the United States Army Air Forces Eighth Air Force and assigned USAAF designation Station 179.

USAAF Station Units assigned to RAF Harrington were:

- 328th Service Group

347th Service Squadron; HHS 328th Service Group

- 39th Service Group

352d and 364th Service Squadron; HHS 39th Service Group

- 18th Weather Squadron
- 35th Station Complement Squadron

Regular Army Station Units included:

- Headquarters (844th Engineer Aviation Battalion)
- 844th Engineer Aviation Battalion
- 1077th Signal Company
- 1139th Military Police Company
- 1220th Quartermaster Company
- 2132nd Engineer Fire Fighting Platoon

==== 801st Bombardment Group (Provisional) ====
The first United States Army Air Forces Eighth Air Force Group to use Harrington was the 801st Bombardment Group (Provisional), arriving from RAF Alconbury on 25 March 1944.

Its initial operational squadrons were:

- 36th Bombardment Squadron
- 406th Bombardment Squadron

Both were equipped with Consolidated B-24 Liberators.

In May, two additional B-24 Liberator squadrons were attached to the group, those being:

- 850th Bombardment Squadron

Attached from: 490th Bombardment Group (RAF Eye)

- 788th Bombardment Squadron

Attached from: 467th Bombardment Group (RAF Rackheath)

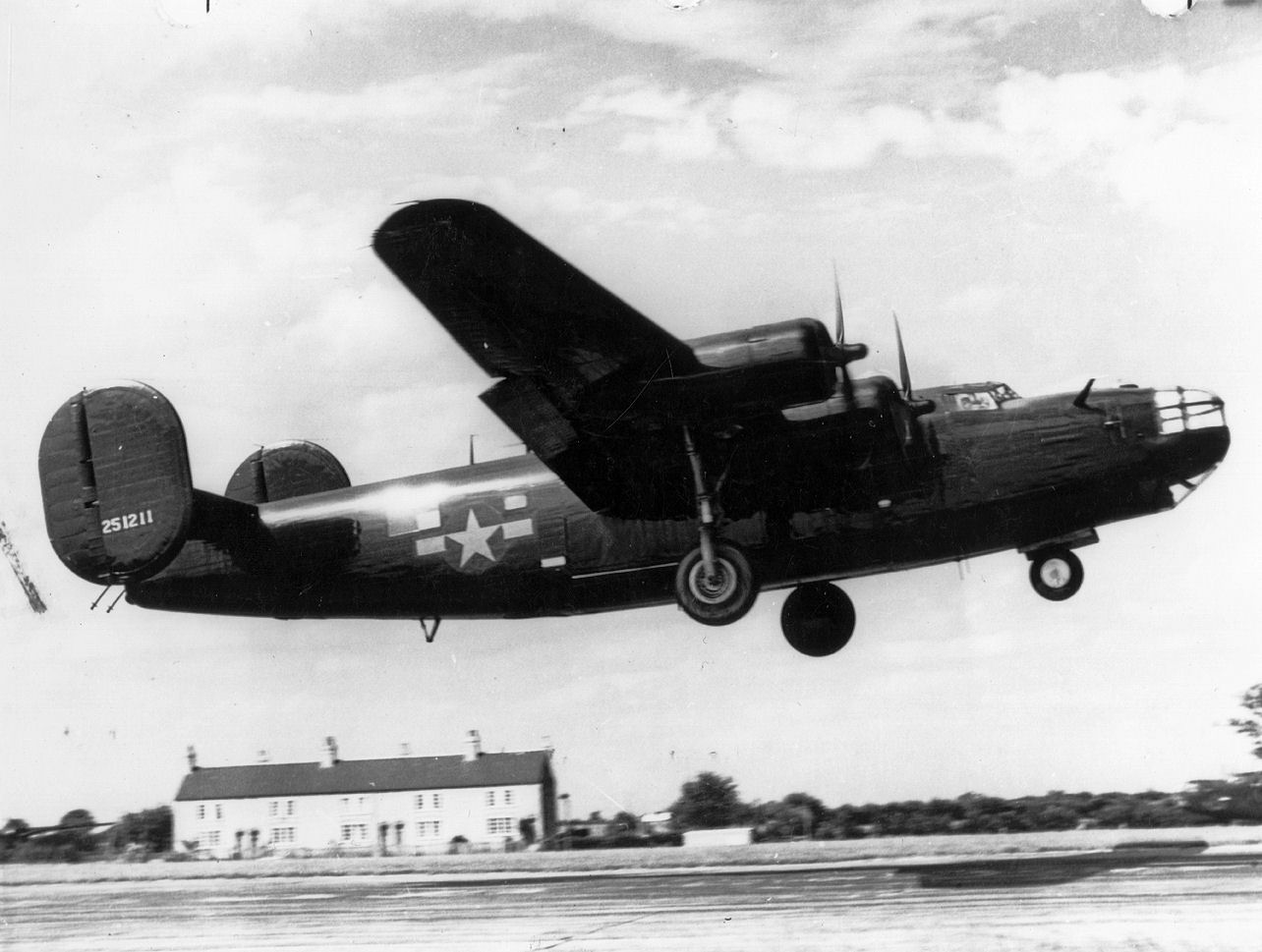
A B-24 Liberator (serial number 42-51211) nicknamed "Miss Fitts" takes off from Harrington

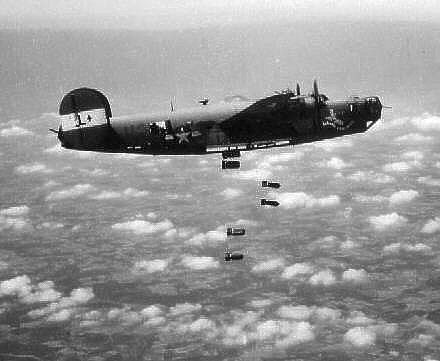
Black Painted B-24 Liberator, on a mission over Nazi-occupied Europe

The 801st Bomb Group became best known as the Carpetbaggers. The mission of the Carpetbaggers was to fly Special Operations missions which entailed delivering supplies to resistance groups in enemy-occupied countries.

The squadrons flew agents and supplies into southern France with B-24 Liberators that had all armament removed except in the top and tail turrets. In addition, the standard bomb shackles were removed from the bomb bay and British shackles were installed to accommodate special supply canisters. All unneeded radio gear was removed, as were the oxygen bottles.

Flash suppressors were installed on the guns, flame dampeners were installed on the turbo-superchargers, and blackout curtains were installed over the waist gun windows. Light bulbs were painted red to spare night vision and special radio gear was added to assist in navigation and homing in on drop zones. The undersides of the aircraft were painted black to avoid detection by enemy searchlights. Combat with the enemy was avoided as it only endangered the success of the mission.

Drops were also made using radio-navigation equipment. Supplies were also released in containers designed to be dropped from the existing equipment in the bomb bay. Pilots often flew several miles farther into enemy territory after completing the drop to disguise the actual drop zone in case enemy observers were tracking the plane's movement.

The Boeing B-17 Flying Fortresses flown by the 788th and 850th Bombardment Squadrons were employed to drop leaflets over Norway, Denmark, the Netherlands, Belgium, Italy, France, Germany, Poland, Greece, and the Balkans. Some leaflets informed the citizens in occupied Europe of war news and Axis losses. Others urged German troops to surrender and offered safe passage through Allied lines. Seventy-seven percent of the German troops captured in France either had one of these leaflets or had seen one.

The leaflets were a trusted source of news for the oppressed citizens of occupied Europe. They were widely read and sometimes carried for months and hidden in false pockets, hats, and shoes. Possession of one of the leaflets meant an automatic death sentence if caught by the Nazis.

==== 492d Bombardment Group (Heavy) ====
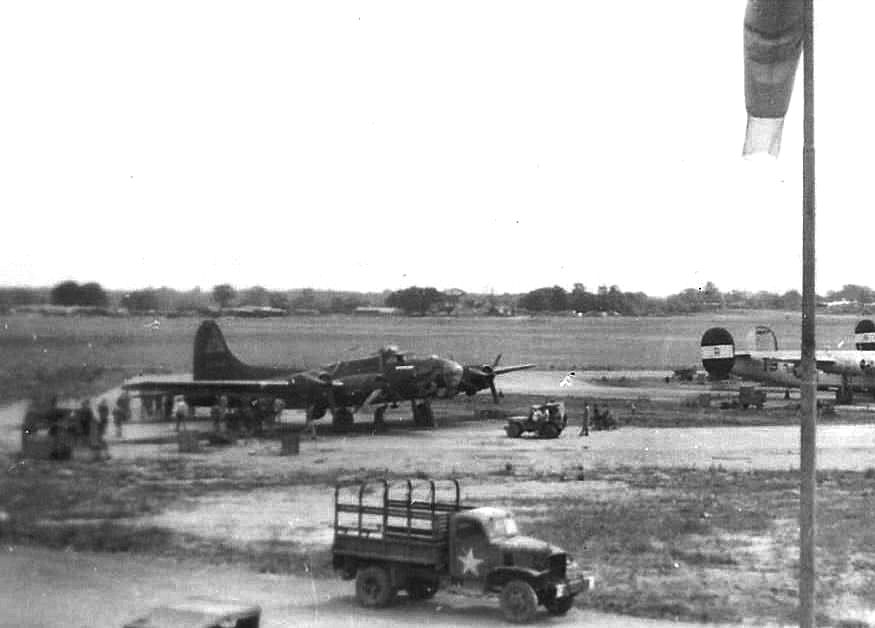
Black-painted B-17G Flying Fortress 43-37516 "Tondelayo" used for night leaflet missions

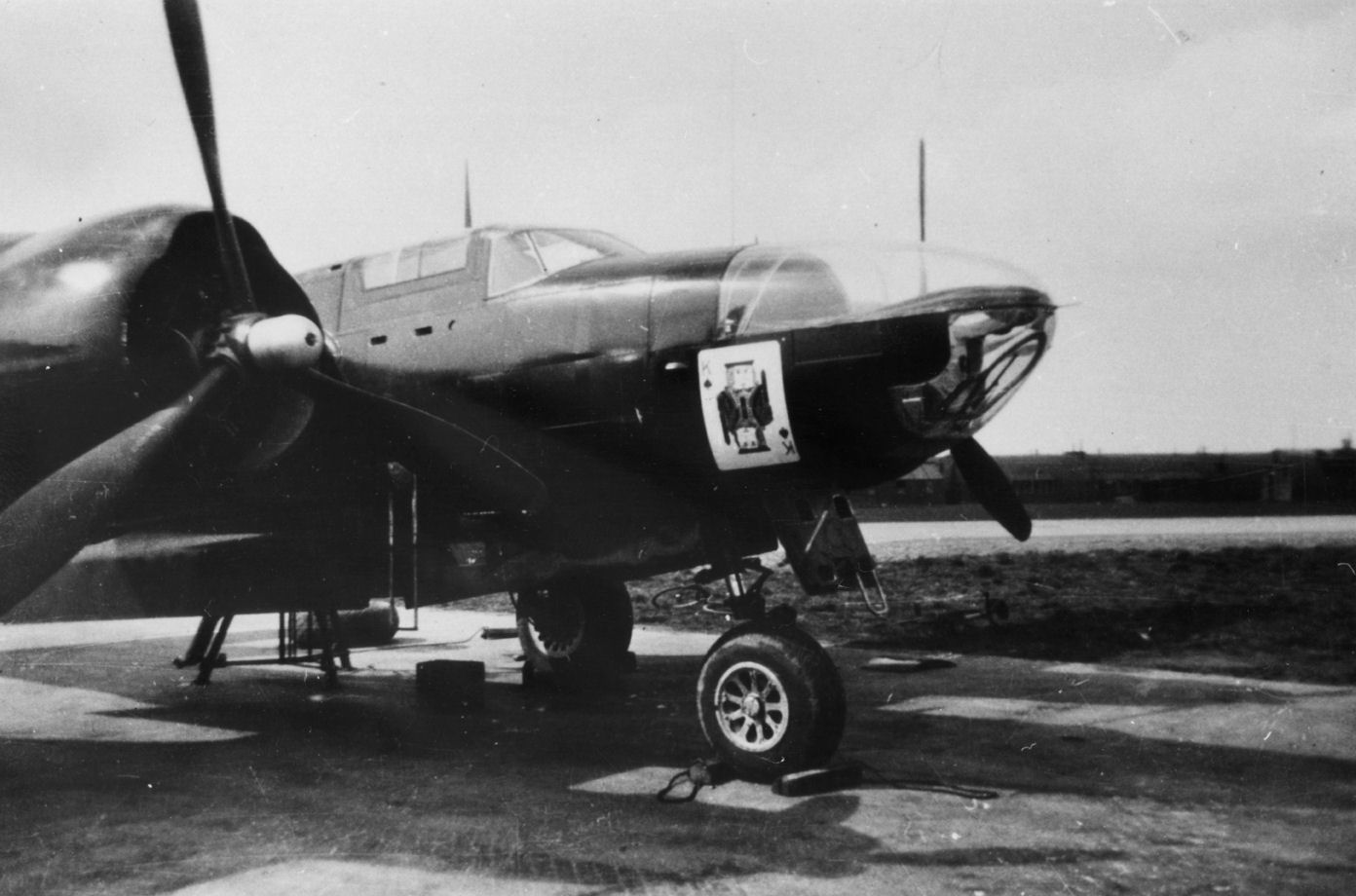
An A-26 Invader of the 492nd Bomb Group at Harrington

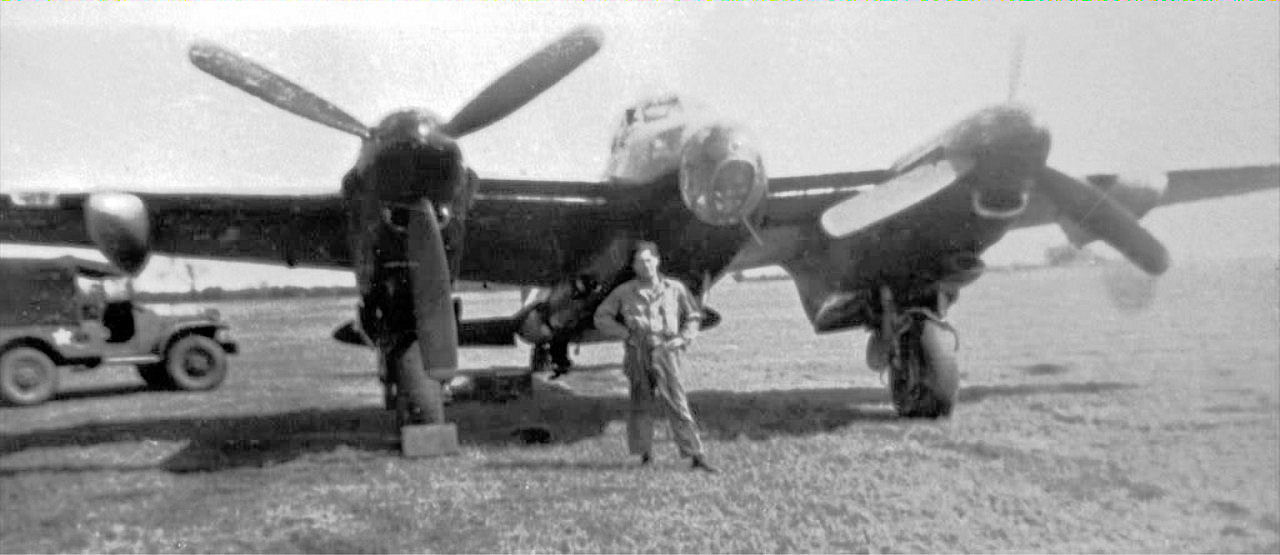
de Havilland DH98 Mosquito of the "Carpetbaggers". Equipped with special Joan – Eleanor radio receivers, and used to collect transmissions from OSS agents in enemy territory on missions nicknamed "Red Stocking".

In August 1944, the 801st Bombardment Group was absorbed by the 492d Bombardment Group (Heavy). The 492d was a "hard luck" B-24 group which had lost 52 aircraft to enemy action in only 89 days, suffering 588 men killed or missing. Rather than try to rebuild the shattered group, the group was stood down and the surviving members were reassigned to other units in theater.

When assigned to Harrington, the 801st Bombardment Group (Provisional) was inactivated in a name-only manner. Headquarters and the ground echelon of the 801st were stood up as the 492d. The operational squadrons of the 801st were stood down and redesignated as the squadrons assigned to the 492d. These were:

- 36th Bombardment Squadron → 856th Bombardment Squadron (B-24) (5Z)
- 406th Bombardment Squadron → 858th Bombardment Squadron (B-24) (9H)
- 850th Bombardment Squadron → 857th Bombardment Squadron (B-17) (9A)
- 788th Bombardment Squadron → 859th Bombardment Squadron (B-17) (X4)

After the units were redesignated, the squadrons attached to the 801st were returned to their previous units without personnel or equipment.

The Group ceased Carpetbagger missions on 16 September 1944 to haul gasoline to advancing mechanized forces in France and Belgium, along with attacking airfields, oil refineries, seaports, and other targets in France, the Low Countries, and Germany until February 1945. In October three of the 492d's squadrons, the 857th, 858th, and 859th, transitioned to night bombing operations. This proved to be a difficult transition, since the aircraft had been modified by the removal of the original bomb shackles and the oxygen systems. By mid-November, Headquarters, Eighth Air Force decided that the Carpetbagger aircraft just were not suitable and finally allocated oxygen-equipped B-24s for the new mission. The night bombing force of the 492nd became known as the "Black Liberators."

On 17 December, the 859th was deployed to the Mediterranean Theater of Operations to perform special operations missions with Fifteenth Air Force. The squadron remained attached to a provisional group in Italy for the balance of the war.

The 492d returned to clandestine "Carpetbagger" operations over Germany and German-occupied territory, using B-24, A-26, and British Mosquito aircraft in March 1945 to drop leaflets, demolition equipment, and agents. The Group received a Distinguished Unit Citation for these operations, performed at night despite adverse weather and vigorous opposition from enemy ground forces. The 492d was also cited by the French government for similar operations over France in 1944.

The unit flew its last Carpetbagger mission in April 1945 and then ferried personnel and equipment to and from the Continent until July. It returned to Sioux Falls AAFld, South Dakota during July and August 1945, and was redesignated as a Boeing B-29 Superfortress (Very Heavy) group to be used over Japan. However, the Japanese surrender cancelled those plans and the Group was inactivated in October.

=== RAF Bomber Command Thor missile use ===
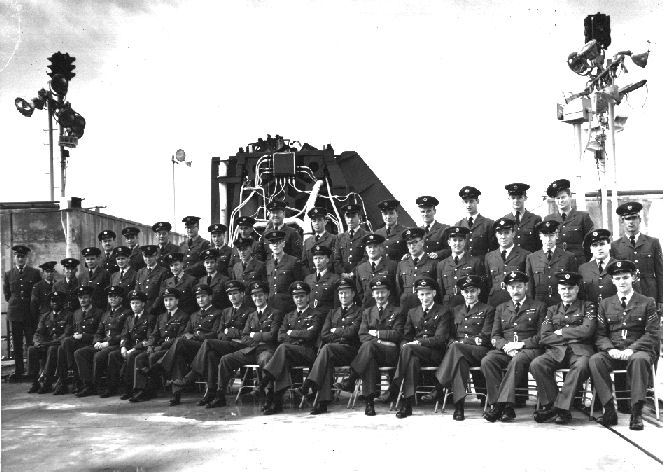
RAF No. 218(SM) Squadron group photo, taken at Vandenberg AFB, California, 1959

After the war, Harrington gradually fell into disuse returning to farmland. However, the base received a new lease of life when it was selected to become one of the RAF's Thor missile sites in 1958. Three rocket launch pads were constructed together with ancillary buildings, the whole area being declared top security, fenced off and floodlighted.

The IRBM WS-315A missile system had a range of 1,500 nautical miles (2,780 km) and was developed by the Douglas Aircraft Corporation during 1955-56. Deployment with RAF Bomber Command began in December 1958 before being phased out with the advent of crewed V-bombers in 1963.

In 2011, just ahead of the 50th anniversary of the Cuban Missile Crisis, the Thor missile site at Harrington was given Grade II listed status as an example of Cold War architecture. As part of the announcement, the Chief Executive of English Heritage, Dr Simon Thurley, said: "The remains of the Cold War are fading from view faster than those of the World Wars. Our Cold War heritage is a complicated and not always easily loved collection of concrete bunkers and silos. But they are the castles and forts of the second half of the 20th century and we want to ensure that the best examples survive."

== Current use ==
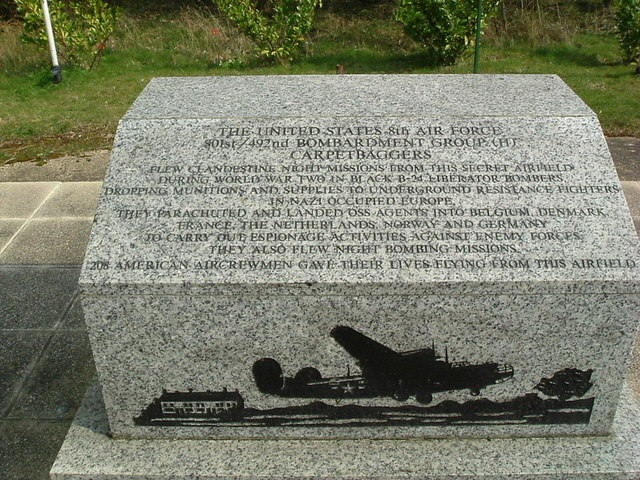
USAF Memorial

With the deactivation of the Thor missiles, Harrington was returned to agriculture. Almost all of the concreted areas of the airfield were removed for hardcore. Today, with the exception of some single-tracked agricultural roads that outline the former perimeter track, there is very little left of Harrington airfield, although the three Thor Missile launch pads are still clearly visible.

=== Carpetbagger Aviation Museum ===
Founded in 1993, the Carpetbagger Aviation Museum is dedicated to the history of RAF Harrington and the 801st Bombardment Group (Provisional). Other displays include the secret work of the Special Operations Executive at RAF Tempsford, the Cold War use of Thor missiles at RAF Harrington, and the Royal Observer Corps.

The museum also includes the Northants Aviation Society Museum, which features remains of recovered World War II aircraft, life on the home front, military equipment and memorabilia.

Also on the site of the museum is the local Kettering and District Amateur Radio Society callsign G5KN and GB2HAM.

=== Wind park ===
During 2010 Nuon now known as Vattenfall United Kingdom was considering building a wind park at this airfield, consisting of seven two-megawatt turbines, in total producing 14 megawatts. However permission was denied due to the significance of the sites Cold War history.

== See also ==
- List of former Royal Air Force stations
