= 551st Special Operations Squadron =

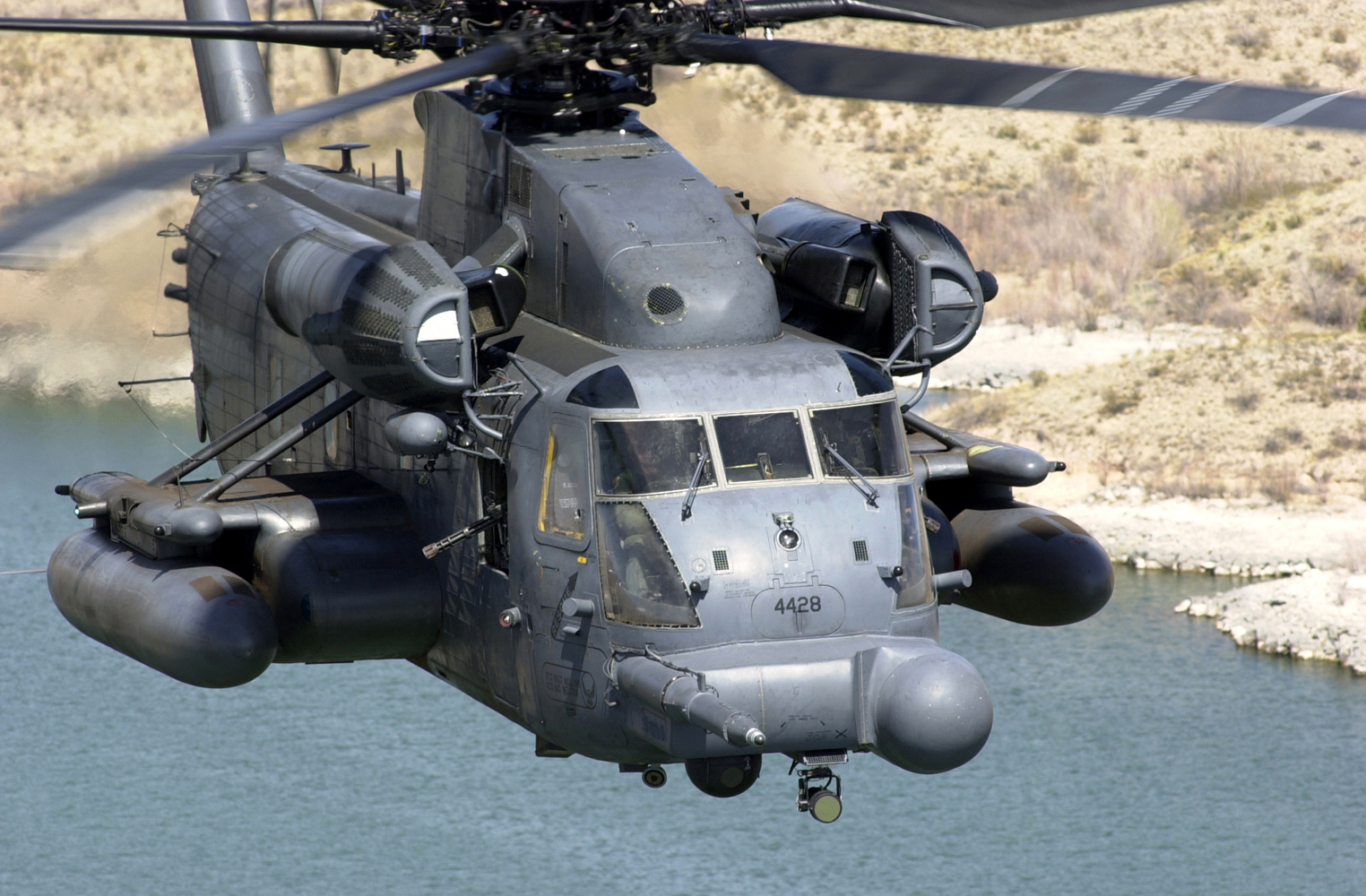
- Squadron MH-53J Pave Low IIIE during training mission
- Active: 1971–2007; 2009–2021
- Country: United States
- Branch: United States Air Force
- Role: Special Operations Training
- Motto(s): The Best Teach the Rest
- Mascot(s): Owl
- Decorations: Air Force Outstanding Unit Award

Insignia
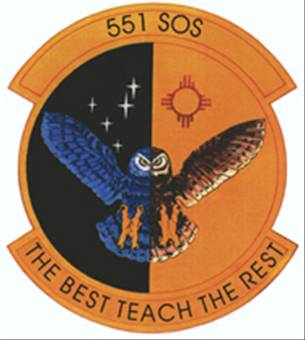
- 551st Special Operations Squadron emblem (Note: Approved 9 October 1992.)

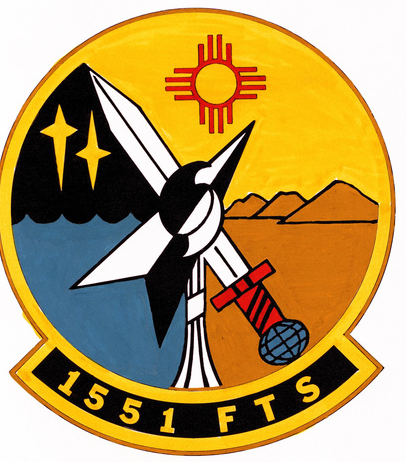
- 1551st Flying Training Squadron emblem (Note: Approved 9 October 1986.)

The 551st Special Operations Squadron was a special operations squadron of the United States Air Force, assigned to the Air Force Special Operations Air Warfare Center until 2017 and then assigned to the 492nd Special Operations Wing. It was based at Cannon Air Force Base, New Mexico. The 551st had previously been stationed at Kirtland Air Force Base, New Mexico as an Air Education and Training Command unit within the 58th Special Operations Wing from 15 March 1976 until its inactivation on 10 May 2007.

The squadron was reactivated in 2009 and assigned to Air Force Special Operations Command to train aircrews on the Lockheed MC-130 and Lockheed AC-130. It was inactivated again on 15 Jun 2021.

== History ==
The 551st was originally designated the 1551st Flying Training Squadron and was assigned to the 1550th Aircrew Training and Test Wing (later the 1550th Combat Crew Training Wing). In 1994, it was redesignated the 551st Special Operations Squadron, and was reassigned to the 58th Operations Group.

The 551st conducted helicopter training until it was inactivated in 2007. It is also responsible for special operations contingencies, exercises, and humanitarian rescue missions. The squadron conducted training on the Pave Low helicopter but suspended these operations due to the looming retirement of the helicopter.

== Lineage ==
- Designated as the 1551st Flying Training Squadron on 1 April 1971 and activated
- Redesignated 551st Flying Training Squadron on 1 October 1991
- Redesignated 551st Special Operations Squadron on 1 April 1994
- Inactivated on 10 May 2007
- Activated on 25 July 2009
- Inactivated on 15 Jun 2021

=== Assignments ===
- 1550th Aircrew Training and Test Wing (later 1550th Combat Crew Training Wing), 1 April 1971
- 542d Operations Group, 1 October 1991
- 58th Operations Group, 1 Apr 1994 – 10 May 2007
- Air Force Special Operations Training Center, 25 July 2009
- Air Force Special Operations Air Warfare Center, 11 February 2013
- 492d Special Operations Training Group, 17 May 2017 – 15 Jun 2021

=== Stations ===
- Hill Air Force Base, Utah, 1 April 1972
- Kirtland Air Force Base, New Mexico, 15 March 1976 – 10 May 2007
- Cannon Air Force Base, New Mexico, 25 July 2009 – 15 Jun 2021

=== Aircraft ===
- Sikorsky HH-3 Jolly Green Giant, 1971-1992
- Kaman HH-43 Huskie, 1971-1975
- Sikorsky HH-53 Super Jolly Green Giant, 1971-1987
- Sikorsky MH-53J Pave Low III,
- Lockheed HC-130 Hercules, 1973-1987
- Bell UH-1 Huey, 1987-2007
- HH-60 Pave Hawk, 1990-2007
- Lockheed MC-130W Combat Spear, 2009-2021
- Lockheed AC-130H Spectre, 2009-2015
- General Atomics MQ-1 Predator, 2009-2021
- Lockheed AC-130W Stinger II, 2009-2021
- Lockheed MC-130J Combat Shadow II, 2009-2021
- General Atomics MQ-9 Reaper, 2009-2021
- Dornier C-146 Wolfhound, 2009-2021
- Pilatus U-28, 2009-2021
- PZL C-145 Skytruck, 2009-2021

== Decorations ==
=== Air Force Outstanding Unit Award ===
- 1 April 1974 – 31 May 1976
- 1 April 1976 – 31 March 1978
- 1 July 1985 – 30 June 1987
- 1 July 1987 – 30 June 1989
- 1 January 1993 – 30 June 1994
- 1 July 1994 – 31 December 1995
- 1 July 1996 – 30 June 1998
- 1 July 1998 – 30 June 2000
- 1 July 2001 – 30 June 2002
- 1 July 2002 – 30 June 2003
- 1 July 2009 – 23 May 2011
