= 6th Special Operations Squadron =

United States Air Force combat aviation advisory unit

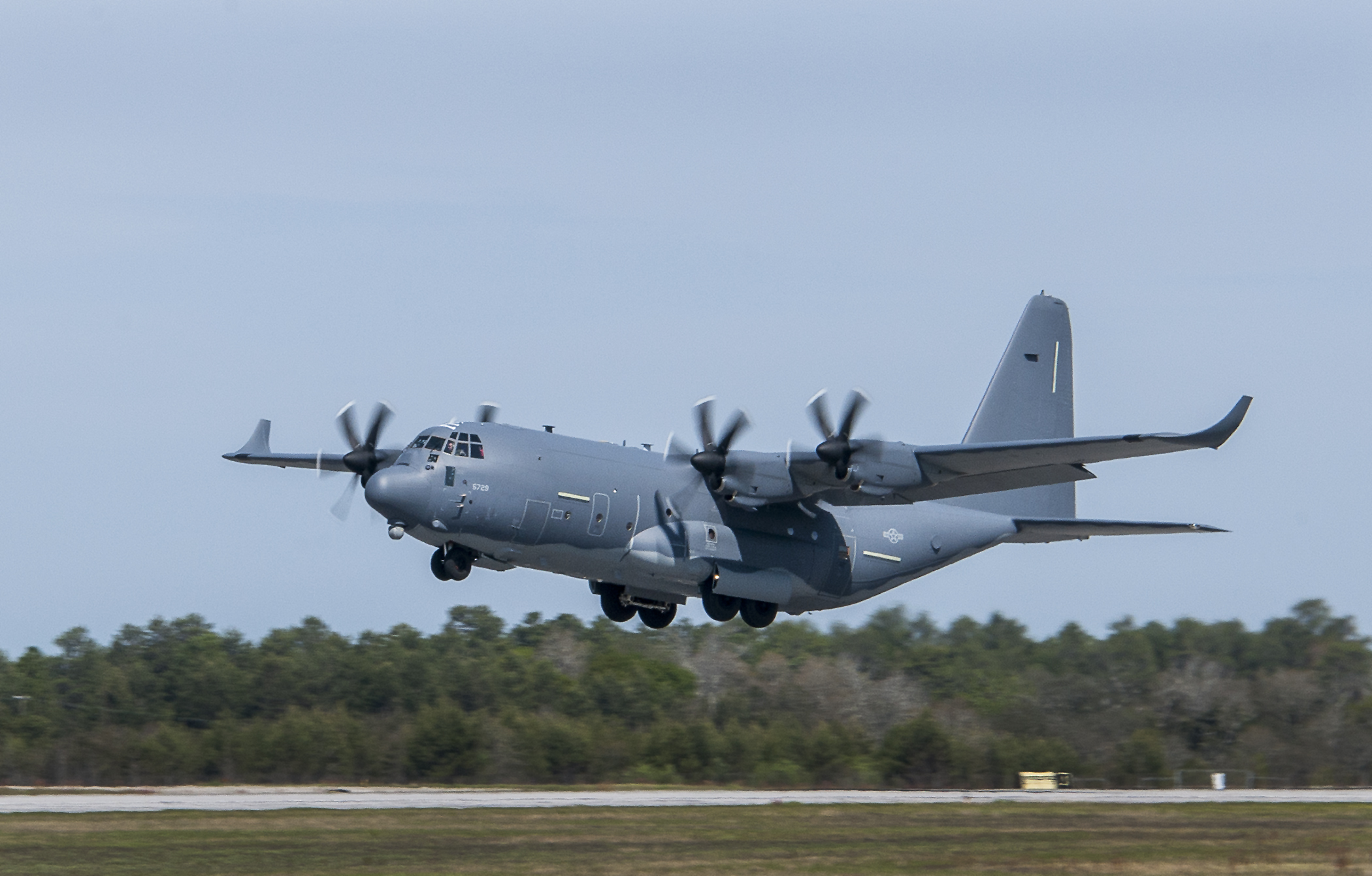
- Lockheed Martin MC-130J Commando II
- Active: 1944–1945; 1962–1969; 1994–2022
- Country: United States
- Branch: United States Air Force
- Role: Special Operations
- Part of: Air Force Special Operations Command
- Garrison/HQ: Cannon Air Force Base
- Decorations: Presidential Unit Citation; Gallant Unit Citation; Air Force Meritorious Unit Award; Air Force Outstanding Unit Award with Combat "V" Device; Air Force Outstanding Unit Award; Republic of Vietnam Gallantry Cross with Palm

Insignia
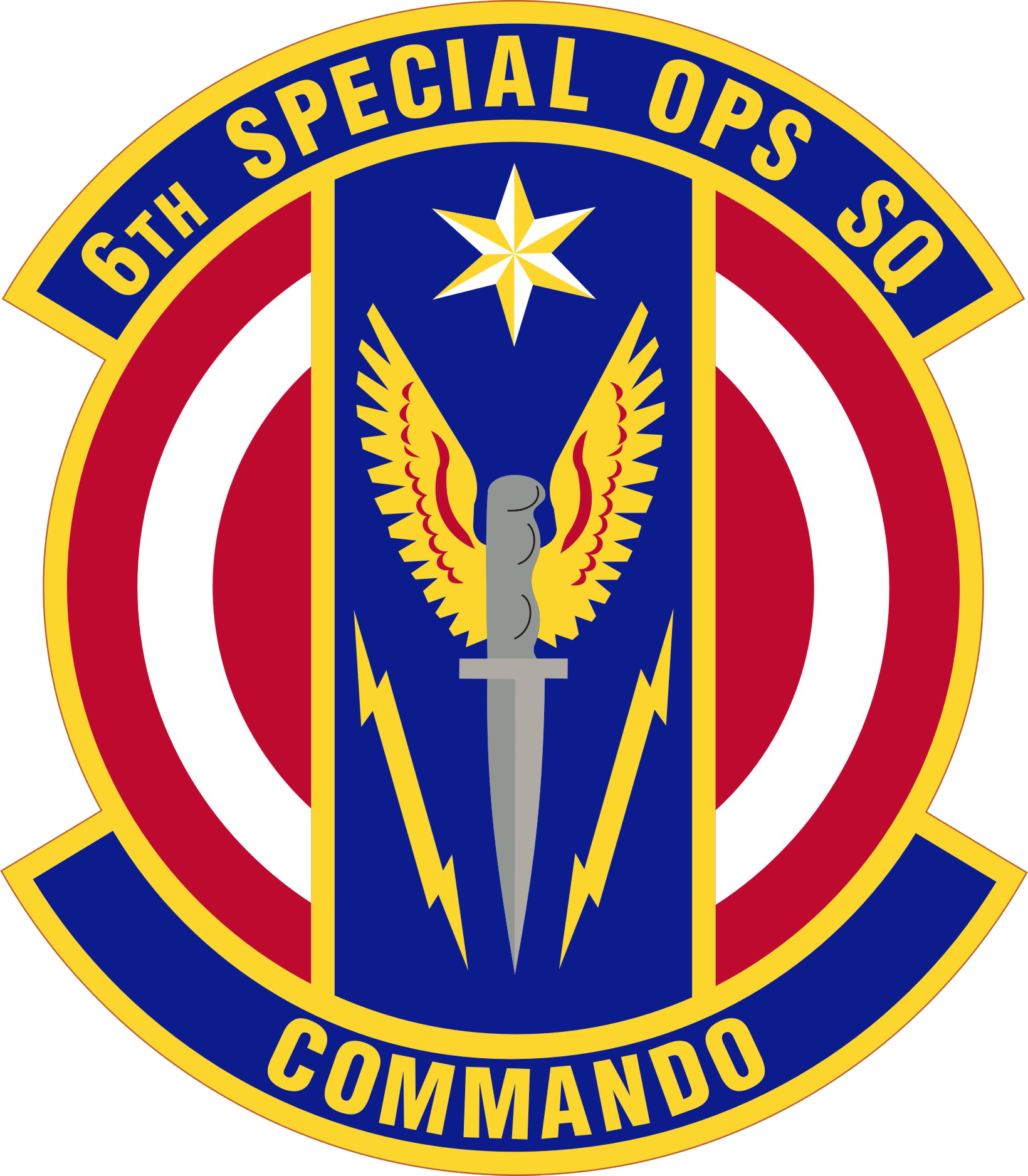
- 6th Special Operations Squadron emblem (Note: Approved 22 March 1966.) (Note: This emblem was revised on 5 September 1997 to reverse the position of the tabs. Bailey. The image depicts the 1997 modification.)

The 6th Special Operations Squadron is part of the 27th Special Operations Wing (27 SOW) at Cannon Air Force Base, New Mexico. The squadron operates MC-130J Commando II aircraft in support of special operations. The 6th SOS specializes in the use of night vision goggles and formation tactics to refuel large helicopter and tilt-rotor formations.

The squadron was first activated in India during World War II as the 6th Fighter Squadron, Commando. The squadron served in combat in the China-Burma-India Theater until May 1945. It was activated again in 1962. In 1968, the squadron deployed to Vietnam, where it again flew combat missions, earning a Presidential Unit Citation, and two Air Force Outstanding Unit Awards with Combat "V" Device before inactivating in 1969. From 1970 to 1974, as the 6th Special Operations Training Squadron, it trained aircrews for special operations, primarily in Southeast Asia.

== History ==
=== World War II ===
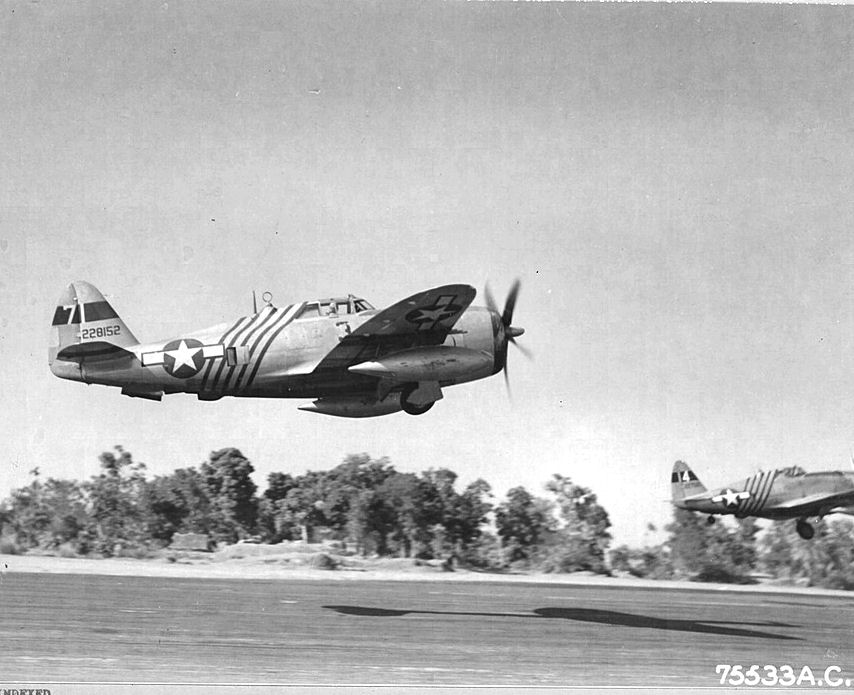
1st Air Commando Group P-47 Thunderbolts

The squadron was first activated at Asansol Airfield, India in September 1944 as the 6th Fighter Squadron, Commando and equipped with Republic P-47 Thunderbolts. In its first months of operation, it flew from several stations in what are now India and Bangladesh, maintaining detachments at Cox's Bazar from 15 to 21 October 1944, 2 to 8 November 1944 and 11 to 18 January 1945, and from Fenny Airfield from 1 to 24 December 1944. The 6th flew combat missions in the China-Burma-India Theater of World War II starting on 17 October 1944. In 1945, the 6th converted to the North American P-51 Mustang, continuing to fly missions until 8 May 1945. The squadron left India in October 1945 and was inactivated upon arriving at the port of embarkation in November. In 1948, the Air Force disbanded the squadron along with its other fighter commando squadrons.

=== Vietnam War ===
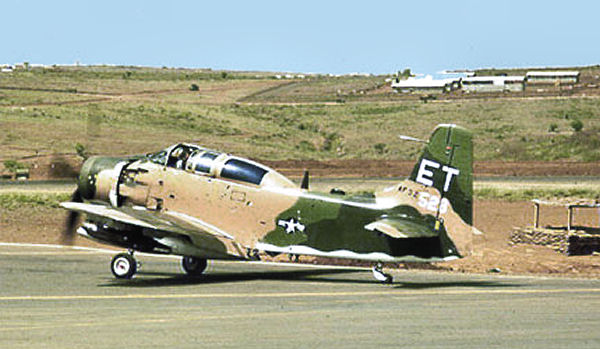
A 6th SOS A-1E Skyraider at Pleiku in 1968–69.

In 1962, the squadron was reconstituted and activated at Eglin Air Force Base Auxiliary Airfield No. 9, Florida, where it was equipped with Douglas B-26 Invaders and North American T-28 Trojans. The 6th trained crews in counterinsurgency and unconventional warfare. It also flew demonstration flights for those tactics. Squadron personnel deployed to South Vietnam, where they served as advisors to Republic of Vietnam Air Force personnel at Bien Hoa Air Base. They also trained airmen from Latin America at Howard Air Force Base, Panama Canal Zone in counterinsurgency tactics.

The squadron reduced to an all T-28 unit in 1963. Many of the 6th's personnel formed cadres for new special operations units being formed. By March 1964, the squadron manning had recovered to the point where it could deploy to Udorn Royal Thai Air Force Base, Thailand, to train air and ground crews in counterinsurgency operations. In 1966, the squadron was redesignated the 6th Air Commando Squadron, Fighter and moved to England Air Force Base along with its parent 1st Air Commando Wing. At England the squadron began to receive Douglas A-1 Skyraider aircraft to replace its T-28s. By December 1967, the last of the T-28s had been transferred.

The unit deployed to Pleiku Air Base, South Vietnam, in February 1968, where it was briefly assigned to the 14th Air Commando Wing until the Air Force formed the 633d Special Operations Wing at Pleiku in July, the same day the unit was renamed the 6th Special Operations Squadron. It began flying combat missions on 1 March 1968, including close air support for ground forces, air cover for transports flying Operation Ranch Hand missions, day and night interdiction missions, combat search and rescue support, armed reconnaissance, and forward air control missions. The unit was awarded a Presidential Unit Citation, and two Air Force Outstanding Unit Awards with Combat "V" Device during its 21 month tour in Vietnam.

It was inactivated in the first reduction in USAF combat forces as ceilings on forces in South Vietnam were reduced. It continued to fly combat until it was inactivated and its A-1s were transferred to the 56th Special Operations Wing, stationed in Thailand.

The squadron returned to England Air Force Base on 8 January 1970 and equipped with Cessna A-37 Dragonfly light attack aircraft. Its mission was replacement training of US Air Force and allied air force pilots on the A-37. The squadron's training mission was reflected in a name change to the 6th Special Operations Training Squadron in August 1972. At England, the 6th was initially assigned to the 4410th Combat Crew Training Wing. As US activity in Southeast Asia drew down, so did the need to train pilots for the war. The 4410th was reduced to a group, and finally inactivated in July 1973, when the squadron returned to the control of the 1st Special Operations Wing, which had left England for Hurlburt Field in 1969. In January 1974, the squadron was assigned to the host wing at England, the 23d Tactical Fighter Wing until it was inactivated in July.

=== Combat Aviation Advisors ===
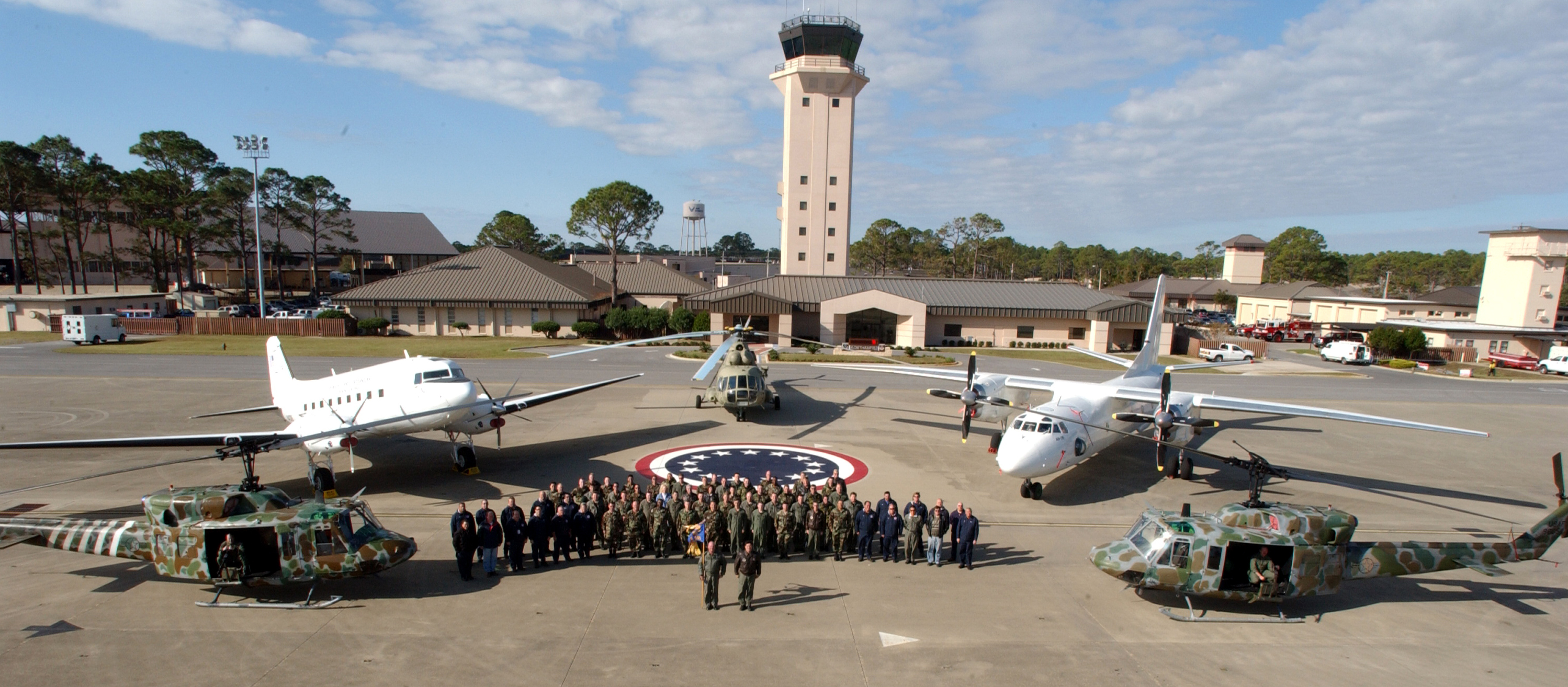
6th Special Operations Squadron and aircraft in 2005

The squadron was redesignated the 6th Special Operations Flight and activated at Hurlburt Field on 1 April 1994, when it absorbed the personnel of Detachment 7, Special Operations Combat Operations Staff, which had been organized in August 1993 to provide an aviation related foreign internal defense capability. Detachment 7, had just made its first major foreign internal defense deployment the preceding month, to Ecuador. By October 1994, the unit had grown and was renamed the 6th Special Operations Squadron once again. Two years later, on 11 October 1996, the squadron became a flying outfit when it received two Bell UH-1N Hueys. Since that time, the squadron has operated a number of US and foreign aircraft in its advisory role. Since 1994 the squadron has sent advisers to help US-allied forces employ and sustain their own airpower resources and, when necessary, integrate those resources into joint and multi-national operations. Until the activation of the 370th Air Expeditionary Advisory Squadron in Iraq in 2007, it was the "sole USAF unit whose primary mission encompassed the training-advising of host nation air forces." This mission often merged with counterinsurgency and foreign internal defense missions in host countries.

The unit moved from Hurlburt Field to Duke Field in 2012, when the 711th Special Operations Squadron transitioned from the Lockheed MC-130E Combat Talon to the foreign internal defense role, the two units jointly assuming the new mission. "As the only two Air Force operational squadrons performing this mission, their deployment tempo is best described as continuous averaging around one deployment a month."

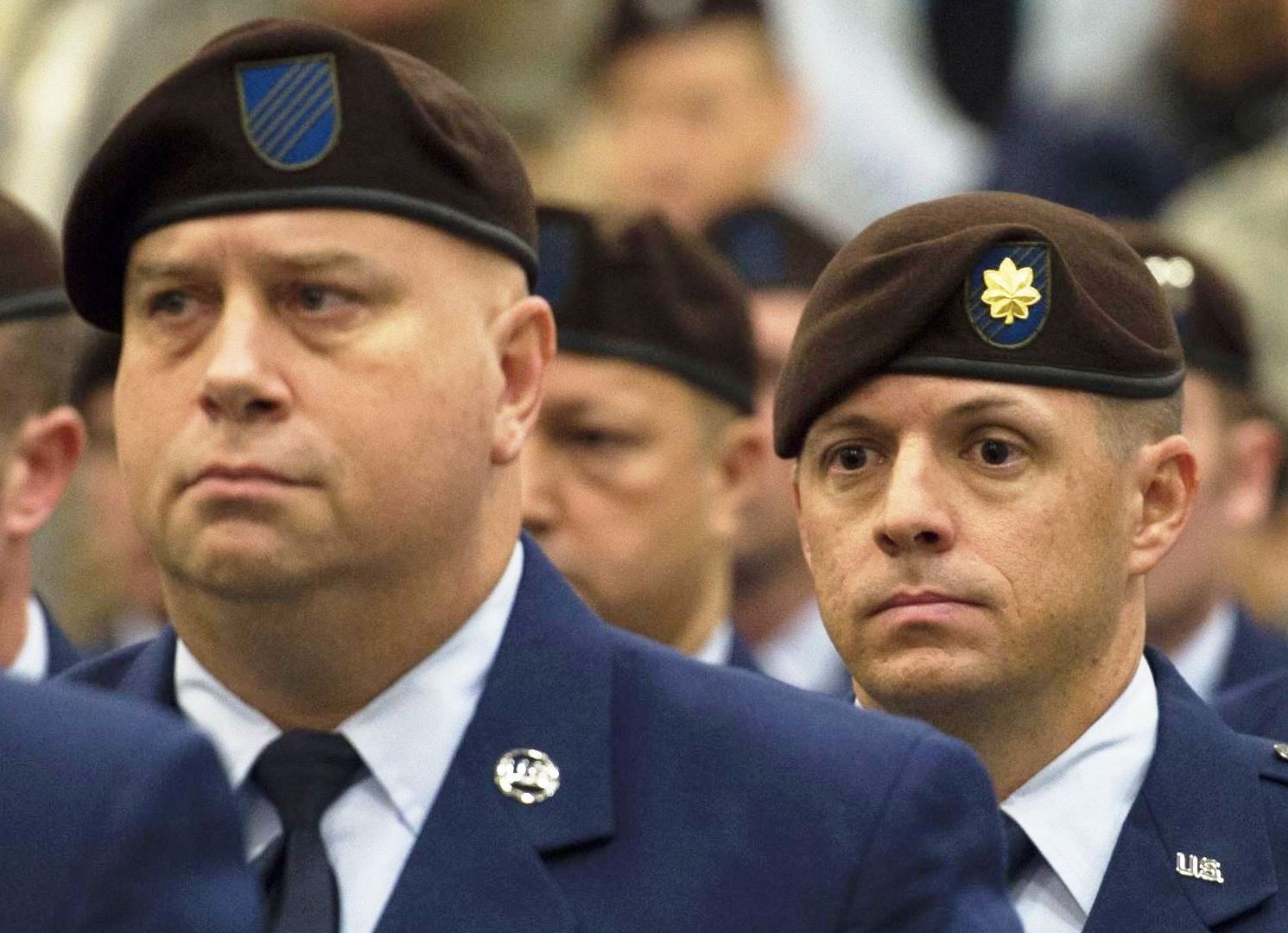
Members of the 6th and 711th Special Operations Squadrons don their brown berets at a special ceremony at Duke Field in 2018

The squadron was composed of Combat Aviation Advisors (CAA), who were specially trained for the conduct of special operations activities by, with, and through foreign aviation forces. CAAs deployed to more than 45 nations, flying more than 40 different types of aircraft to carry out their mission. CAAs supported operations in multiple theater commands around the globe. Just over 900 airmen of the squadron earned the title of CAA over the last 30 years. They were authorized to wear special-colored beret signifying the unique skills CAAs possess to others throughout the military. On 6 January 2018, Lt. Gen. Brad Webb, then AFSOC commander, presented members of the 6th SOS with the brown beret. The brown color represents a CAA's ability to see fertile soil where others see barren land. With the transition of the 6th's air advising capabilities to meet future requirements, CAAs will no longer wear the brown beret.

== Lineage ==
- Constituted as the 6th Fighter Squadron, Commando on 22 September 1944

Activated on 30 September 1944
Inactivated on 3 November 1945

- Disbanded on 8 October 1948
- Reconstituted and activated on 18 April 1962 (not organized)

Organized on 27 April 1962

- Redesignated 6th Air Commando Squadron, Fighter on 15 June 1966
- Redesignated 6th Special Operations Squadron on 15 July 1968

Inactivated on 15 November 1969
Activated on 8 January 1970

- Redesignated 6th Special Operations Training Squadron on 31 August 1972

Inactivated on 15 September 1974

- Redesignated 6th Special Operations Flight on 25 March 1994

Activated on 1 April 1994

- Redesignated 6th Special Operations Squadron on 1 October 1994

Inactivated c. 6 October 2022

=== Assignments ===
- 1st Air Commando Group, 30 September 1944 – 3 November 1945 (attached to 1st Provisional Fighter Group 7 February – 8 May 1945, 2d Air Commando Group, 23 May – 20 June 1945)
- Tactical Air Command, 18 April 1962 (not organized)
- 1st Air Commando Group (later 1st Air Commando Wing), 27 April 1962
- 14th Air Commando Wing, 29 February 1968
- 633d Special Operations Wing, 15 July 1968 – 15 November 1969
- 4410th Combat Crew Training Wing (later 4410th Special Operations Training Group), 8 January 1970
- 1st Special Operations Wing, 31 July 1973
- 23d Tactical Fighter Wing, 1 January 1974 – 15 September 1974
- 16th Operations Group, (later 1st Special Operations Group), 1 April 1994
- Air Force Special Operations Training Center, 1 October 2012
- Air Force Special Operations Air Warfare Center, 11 February 2013
- 492d Special Operations Wing, 10 May 2017 – c. 6 October 2022

=== Stations ===
- Asansol Airfield, India, 30 September 1944
- Hay, India, 7 February 1945
- Asansol Airfield, India, 9 May 1945
- Kalaikunda Airfield, India, 23 May 1945
- Asansol Airfield, India, 22 June – 6 October 1945
- Camp Kilmer, New Jersey, 1–3 November 1945
- Eglin Air Force Base Auxiliary Airfield 9, Florida, 27 April 1962
- England Air Force Base, Louisiana, 15 January 1966 – 17 February 1968
- Pleiku Air Base, South Vietnam, 19 February 1968 – 15 November 1969

Detachment at Da Nang Air Base, South Vietnam, 1 April 1968 – 1 September 1969

- England Air Force Base, Louisiana, 8 January 1970 – 15 September 1974
- Hurlburt Field, Florida, 1 April 1994
- Duke Field, Florida, 2012 – c. 6 October 2022

• Cannon AFB, New Mexico, 2022 - Present

=== Aircraft ===
- Republic P-47 Thunderbolt (1944–1945)
- North American P-51 Mustang (1945)
- Douglas B-26 Invader (1962–1963)
- Douglas RB-26 Invader (1962–1963)
- Helio L-28 (later Helio U-10 Courier) (1962–1963)
- North American T-28 Trojan (1962–1967)
- Douglas A-1 Skyraider (1963, 1966; 1967–1969)
- Cessna A-37 Dragonfly (1970–1974)
- Bell UH-1N Huey (1996–2012)
- CASA C-212 Aviocar (1998-unknown)
- Bell UH-1H Huey (1996–2012)
- Lockheed C-130 Hercules (1996–2012)
- Mil Mi-8 (2002–2012)
- Cessna 208 Caravan
- Beechcraft King Air 350
- Eurocopter AS332 Super Puma
- Basler BT-67 (2002–2008)
- Mil Mi-17 (2002–2012)
- de Havilland Canada DHC-6 Twin Otter (2010–2012)
- Antonov An-26 (2003–2007)
- PZL C-145 Skytruck (2012–2022)
- Lockheed Martin MC-130J Commando II (2022-Present)
