= 13th Airlift Squadron (Polish Air Force) =

- Active: 1963 – present
- Country: Poland
- Allegiance: Polish Air Force
- Type: Airlift Squadron
- Role: Transport
- Base: 8th Airlift Air Base

Commanders
- Squadron Leader: col. pil. Leszek Leśniak

Aircraft flown
- Transport: CASA C-295M, PZL M-28

13th Airlift Squadron – also referred to as 13.ELTR - 13 Eskadra Lotnictwa Transportowego in Poland – is an airlift squadron of the Polish Air Force, established in 1963 in Kraków, Poland. The squadron is stationed in the 8th Air Base.

== Equipment ==
Aircraft	Origin	Type
CASA C-295M	Spain	Transport Aircraft
PZL M-28B Bryza	Poland	Small Transport Aircraft

=== Retired aircraft ===
- Antonov An-26
- Antonov An-12
- Antonov An-2
- Iliushin Il-14
