= 2016 Indonesian Police PZL M28 Skytruck crash =

2016 air crash in Riau Islands, Indonesia

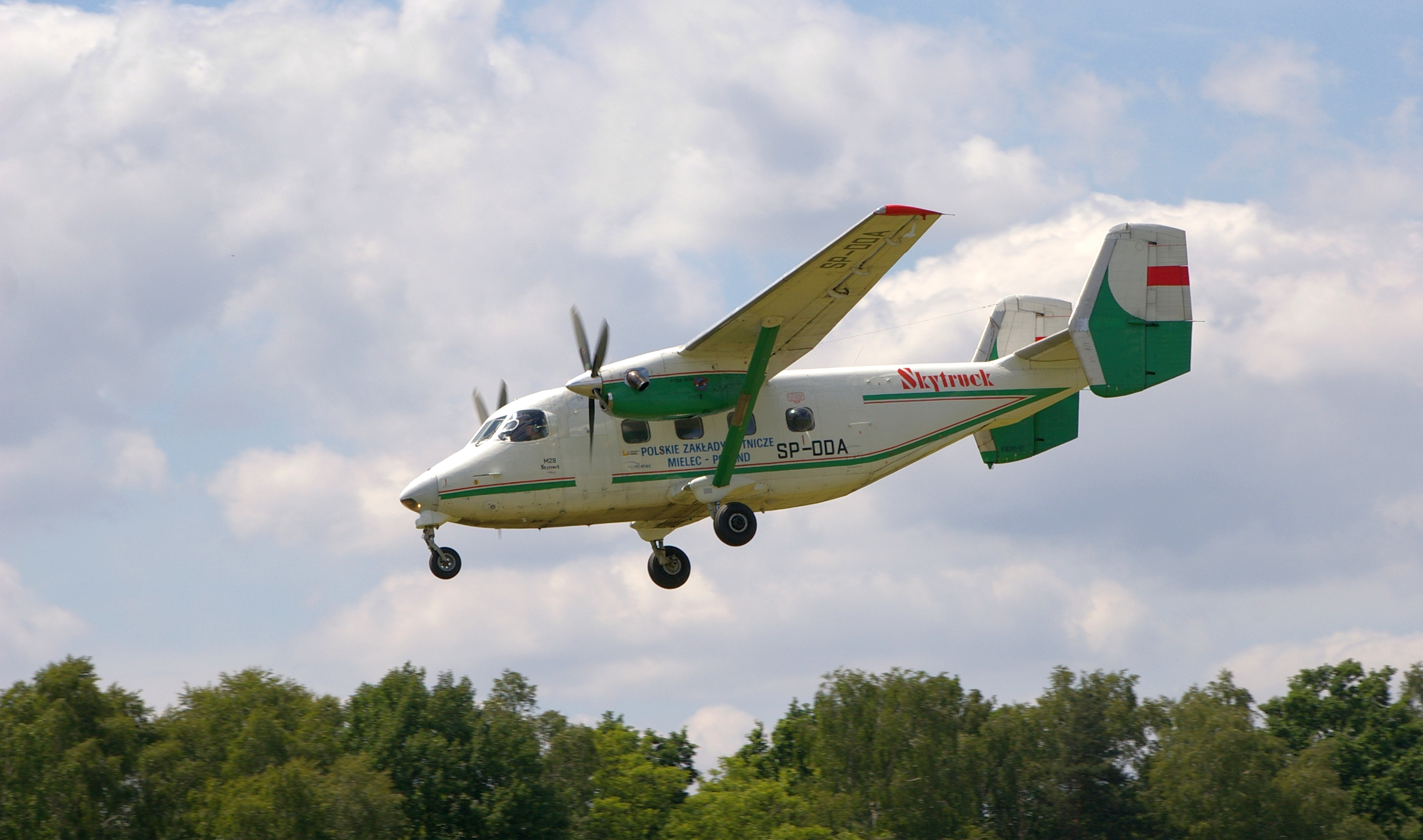
- A PZL M28 Skytruck of Poland, similar to the crashed aircraft.

Accident
- Date: 3 December 2016
- Summary: Possible engine failure
- Site: Near Dabo Singkep, Lingga regency, Riau Islands, Indonesia; 00°17′24″N 104°50′26″E

Aircraft
- Aircraft type: PZL M28 Skytruck
- Operator: Indonesian National Police
- Registration: P-4201
- Flight origin: Depati Amir Airport, Pangkal Pinang, Indonesia
- Destination: Hang Nadim Airport, Batam, Indonesia
- Occupants: 13
- Passengers: 10
- Crew: 3
- Fatalities: 13
- Survivors: 0

On 3 December 2016, a PZL M28 Skytruck of the Indonesian National Police disappeared above the South China Sea while approaching Hang Nadim Airport in Riau Islands. The aircraft was conducting a flight from Depati Amir Airport in Pangkal Pinang, the capital of Bangka Belitung province. The aircraft was carrying three pilots and ten passengers with no survivors on the aircraft. A search and rescue team was assembled by the Indonesian National Search and Rescue Agency with assistance from Singapore.

== Aircraft and crew ==
The aircraft involved was a PZL M28 Skytruck, registered in Indonesia as P-4201 and was manufactured in 2004. It had accumulated just over 2,500 flying hours.

According to officials, the crew members were experienced with more than 2,000 hours flying time.

== Accident ==
The aircraft was transporting 13 people consisting of 10 passengers and 3 crew. All of them were members of the Indonesian National Police.

The aircraft took off from Depati Amir Airport at 09:24 local time and was en route to Hang Nadim Airport in Batam, Riau Islands. The aircraft was expected to land in Batam at 10:58 local time. While flying above the Senayang Sea, a technical issue occurred. Smoke was seen emitting from the aircraft's engine. Local fishermen who saw the crash stated that shortly after the first smoke came out from the engine, the aircraft nose-dived and plunged onto the sea.

== Search and rescue ==
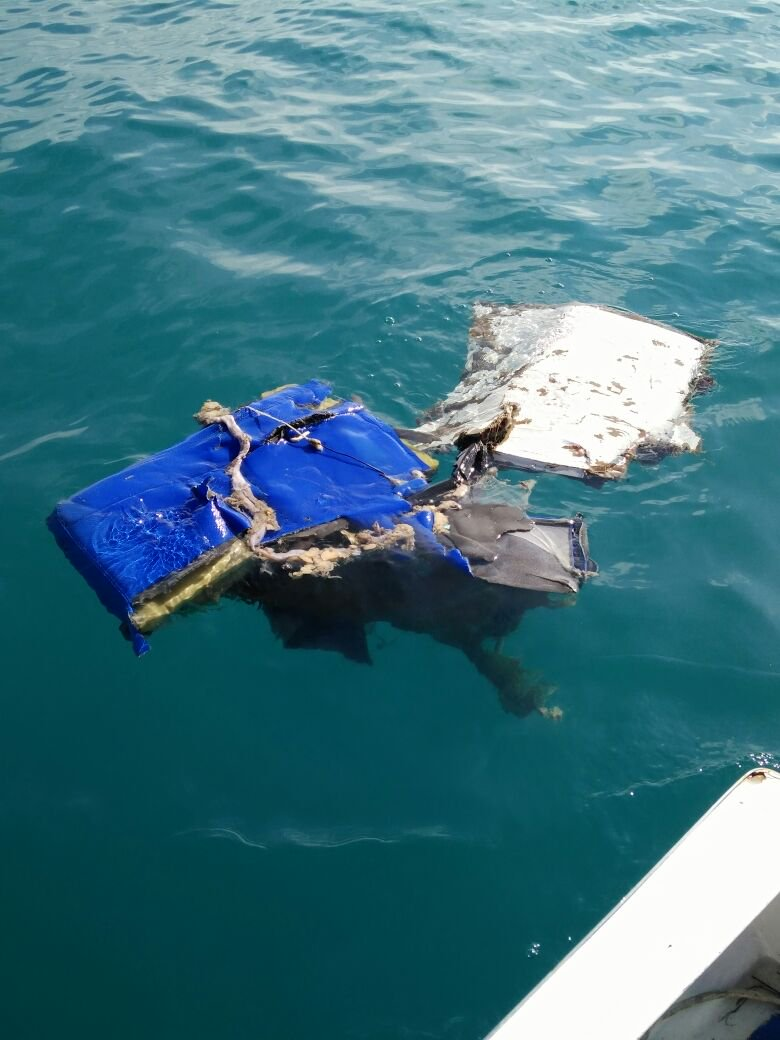
Debris found by the search and rescue team during the operation

Immediately after the crash, debris began to float to the surface. At 12:30 local time, fishermen from Kijang recovered a blue piece of debris suspected from the aircraft. They also recovered several seats and personal belongings. Body parts were also found. The fishermen stated that they found the debris around 40 nautical miles (46 mi; 74 km) from Kijang, the seat capital of Tanjung Pinang.

A search and rescue team was immediately assembled by the National Search and Rescue Agency.

Tanjung Pinang's SAR team deployed two of its boats to search for the wreckage of the aircraft. The search was led by the Head of Riau Islands Regional Police. Police had also deployed four boats in response to the crash. The Indonesian Navy also sent its ships in response to the crash, the KRI Cucut and the KRI Pattimura. Search team members stated that they had only found several personal belongings from the victims, including photos of the passengers of the aircraft. The search and rescue effort was hampered by bad weather. The head of the operation Sam Budigusdian stated that the operation was stalled as no aircraft was allowed to fly due to the inclement weather. In addition, communications in the area were limited.

Mutilated bodies and a full body were found near the crash site at 17:55 local time along with an oil slick at a depth of 24 metres (79 ft). The following day another three ships, from the Indonesian customs service, joined the operation. The search and rescue operation became an international effort, as Singapore joined the operation with an aircraft and a helicopter. Investigators from National Transportation Safety Committee (NTSC) also joined the search. According to the head of the National Search and Rescue Agency, at least 300 personnel and 15 ships were involved in the search and rescue operation.

The search area was widened to 200 square nautical miles (260 sq mi; 690 km^{2}). Officials stated that the search area was focused around Mantang and Kijang. The location of the detected oil slick on 3 December was pinpointed by officials. An analysis by officials revealed that the sea where the aircraft had crashed was shallow, at a depth of 23–32 metres (75–105 ft). Divers were deployed to join the operation. According to eyewitnesses, the aircraft dived and struck the water nose-first. Based on analysis on the debris, most debris found by the search and rescue team were parts of the front section of the aircraft. Officials stated that the front part of the aircraft may have been shattered during the impact. Officials added that they suspect that most bodies were trapped inside the submerged wreckage.

Governor of Riau Islands Nurdin Basirun and high ranking commander Fahri joined the search and rescue operation. Governor Nurdin Basirun later ordered fishermen to join the search and rescue effort, stating that "their eyes are more accurate". He asked fishermen to report to local authorities if they found any personal belongings or wreckage from the sea.

The area that was focused during the search and rescue operation was an area between four islands, which were Pulau Pintar, Pulau Sebangka, Pulau Senayang and Pulau Menasak. Officials stated that the bodies of the missing passengers and the debris of the aircraft couldn't have been swept far away from the main wreckage as sea current and wind force around the area was not strong enough to swept the wreckage. However, according to Soelistyo, the head of the National Search and Rescue Agency, though the main wreckage was located in Indonesia, the flight recorders could have been swept away to the Singaporean territory. He then asked the Singaporean Government for their cooperation in finding the recorders.

The search was continued on 5 December 2016. By then four bodies had been found. Commissioner Erlangga stated that the aircraft's tail was planned to be raised from the sea at 10:00 local time. The 3-metre-long (9.8 ft) piece of wreckage was found at a depth of 24 metres (79 ft) and was located at a coordinates of 0 17' 321" N 104 50' 518" E. The search area was also widened and added for an additional 5 kilometres (3.1 mi; 2.7 nmi), as the retrieved bodies had moved around 5 kilometres (3.1 mi; 2.7 nmi) from the main wreckage.

Due to the discovery of several pieces of wreckage on 5 December, the Search and Rescue Agency focused on the salvage operation of the wreckage the following day. During the search, another body part was found by the searchers. On the same day, the Disaster Victims Identification (DVI) team sent 7 DNA samples to Jakarta for further examination.

On 12 December 2016, the search and rescue operation was officially ended, with rescuers managing to recover 50% of the aircraft's wreckage.

== Investigation ==
Eyewitnesses claimed that the aircraft's engine was emitting smoke or fire. The aircraft later nose-dived and exploded as it plunged onto the sea. According to local fishermen, the aircraft went down at 10:22. While the aircraft was nose-diving, eyewitnesses noted that the engine made an unusual sound. There was no explosion until the aircraft struck the water. According to officials, the aircraft was airworthy and was in good condition at the time of the accident. The aircraft had been checked before the flight. Commissioner Rikwanto stated that the aircraft was not equipped with flight recorders as it was not mandated to fit them, contrary to earlier reports in which the aircraft was equipped with recorders. Investigators would examine the air traffic control recordings from Singapore, Jakarta and Batam.

== Aftermath ==
A public outcry followed immediately after the crash, with social media users asking the President to immediately review every government-operated aircraft. Indonesian National Police said that an evaluation of the PZL M28 aircraft in its fleet would take place, as it had lost three aircraft of the same type.

On December 16 2016, following the crash of an Indonesian Air Force Lockheed C-130 Hercules in Wamena which killed 13 people, the head of the People's Representative Council announced that the government would review every government-operated aircraft.

== See also ==
- List of accidents and incidents involving airliners in Indonesia
