= Air Force Special Operations Air Warfare Center =

- AFSOAWC
- Purpose: To train forces to conduct special operations missions
- Headquarters: Hurlburt Field, Florida
- Locations: Duke Field, Florida; Robins AFB, Georgia
- Official language: English
- Leader: Brigadier General Jon Weeks

The United States Air Force Special Operations Air Warfare Center (AFSOAWC) is headquartered at Hurlburt Field, FL, with satellite locations at Duke Field, FL, and Robins AFB, GA. It works under the supervision of the Air Force Special Operations Command (AFSOC); Its primary function is to organize, train, educate and equip forces to conduct special operations missions; lead MAJCOM Irregular Warfare activities; execute special operations test and evaluation and lessons learned programs; and develop doctrine, tactics, techniques and procedures for Air Force Special Operations Forces. The Vision is, "Transforming Airmen into Air Commandos who possess the specialized skills and warrior ethos to fight and win anytime, anywhere."

== History and overview ==
The Special Operations Air Warfare Center was originally formed at Hurlburt Field in 1962 to train and deploy some of the first special operations airmen, known as Air Commandos, in irregular warfare. The first graduates eventually took on advisory and combat roles assisting the Army of the Republic of Vietnam during the Vietnam War. The program was dissolved after the war due to budget cuts.

The Air Force Special Operations Air Warfare Center was activated on 11 February 2013 with the deactivation of the Air Force Special Operations Training Center (AFSOTC). As a result, the major units that fall under the center include: U.S. Air Force Special Operations School, 371st Special Operations Combat Training Squadron, 19th Special Operations Squadron, 551st Special Operations Squadron from Cannon Air Force Base, N.M., 18th Flight Test Squadron, 6th Special Operations Squadron and the 745th Special Operations Squadron, which were formerly assigned to AFSOTC.

The center was inactivated on 17 May 2017 and its functions were assumed by the 492d Special Operations Wing.

== Leadership ==
Brigadier General Jon Weeks, took command of the newly created Air Force Special Operations Air Warfare Center at a ceremony on Duke Field, Florida on 11 February 2013.
