= Air Commando Development Center =

American Military Training Center

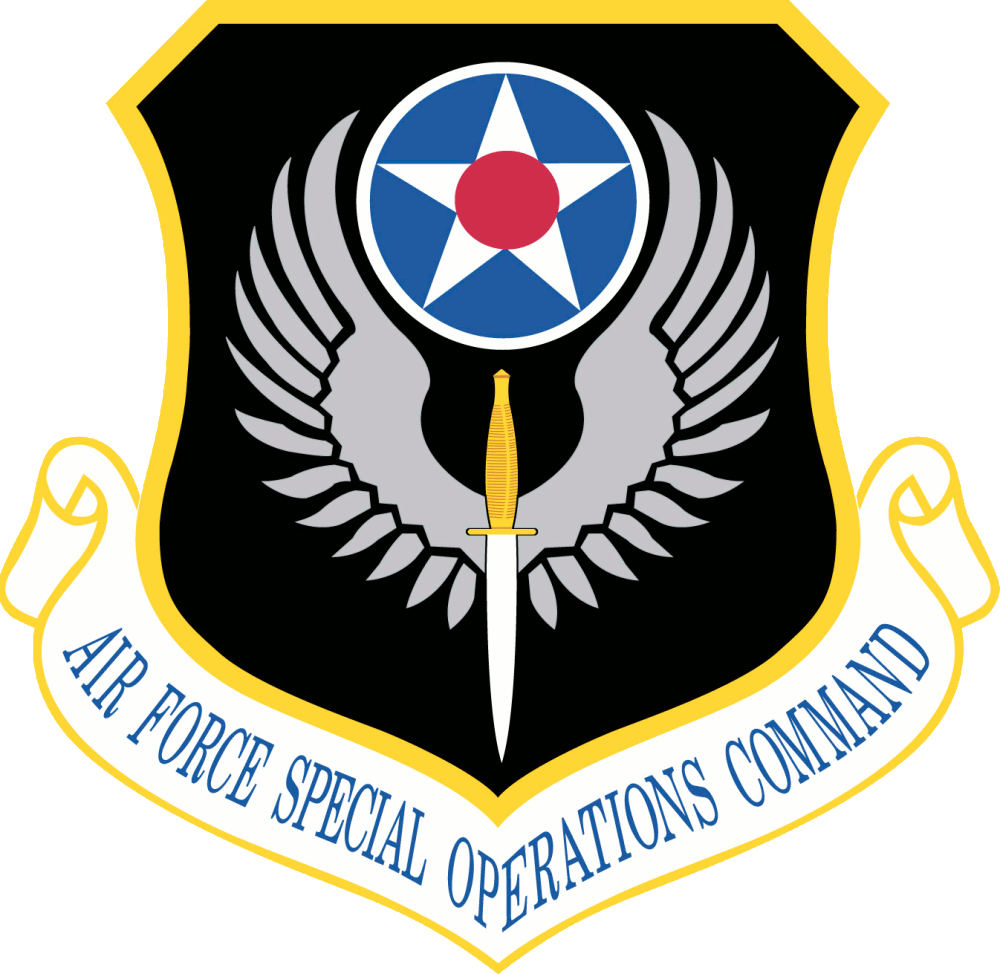
Air Commando Development Center

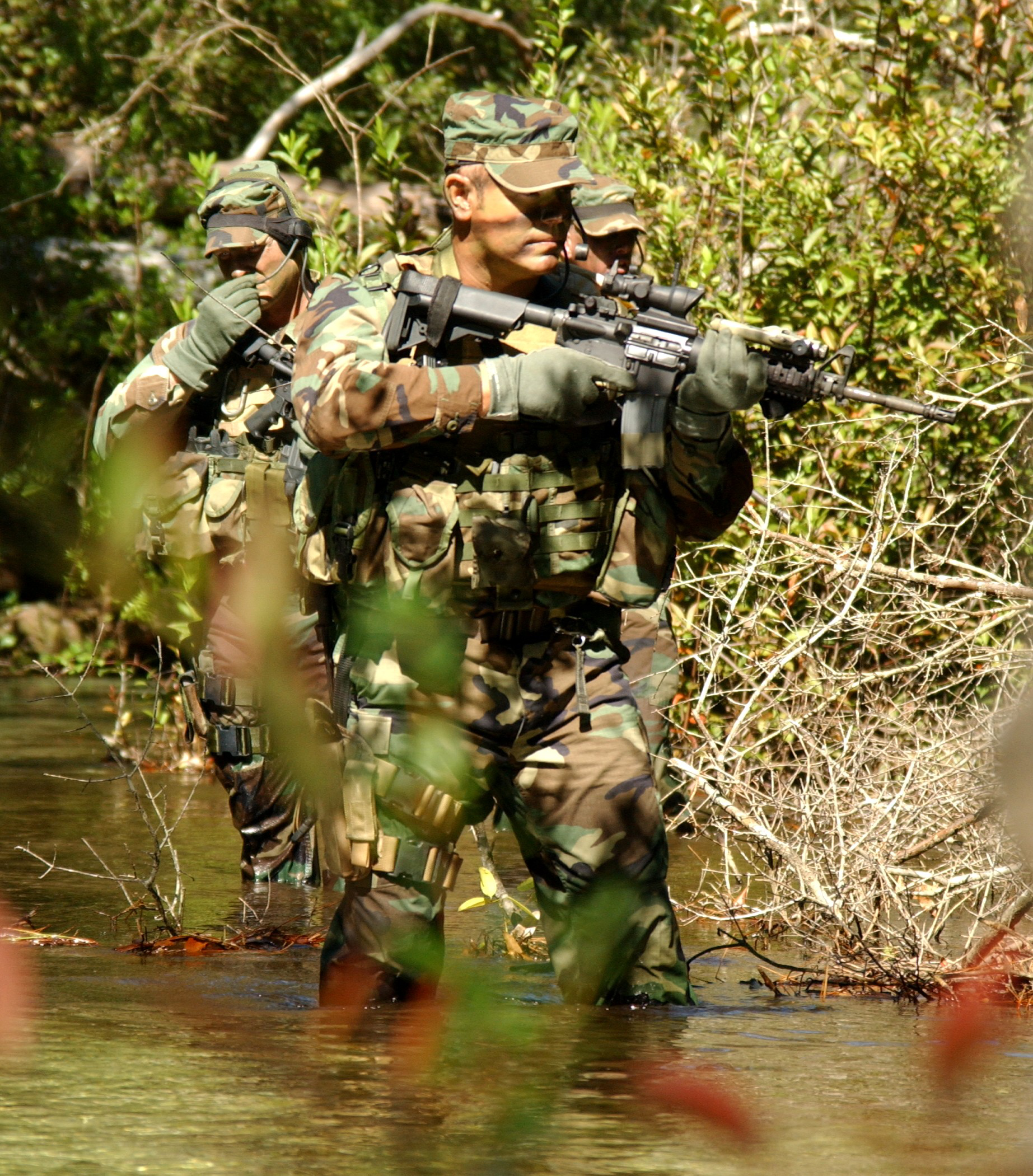
- Air Force special operations training near Hurlburt Field
- Active: 1983–1994; 2008–2013; 2024–present
- Country: United States
- Branch: United States Air Force
- Part of: Air Force Special Operations Command
- Garrison/HQ: Hurlburt Field, Florida
- Decorations: Air Force Organizational Excellence Award

Insignia
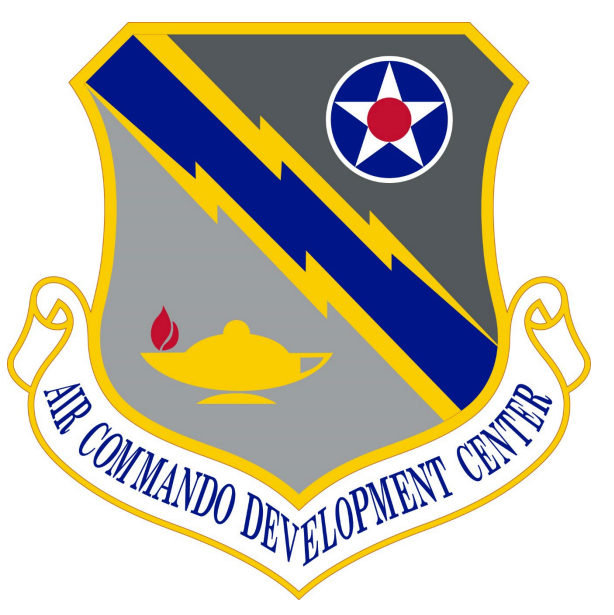
- Air Commando Development Center emblem (Note: Approved 5 December 2008.)

The United States Air Commando Development Center is an active United States Air Force unit stationed at Hurlburt Field, Florida, assigned to Air Force Special Operations Command. It was first activated in October 1983 as the Special Operations Test and Evaluation Center, testing Air Force special operations equipment and serving until April 1994, when it was inactivated. In October 2008, it was again activated as the Air Force Special Operations Training Center to train special operations forces, inactivating in February 2013, when its functions were transferred to the Air Force Special Operations Air Warfare Center. It was most recently activated in February 2024.

== Mission ==
The center employs special operations forces peculiar training, resources, and technologies to provide air commandos the skills to compete in all-domain, full spectrum joint operations. It develops air commandos for mission sustainment teams, special operations task units and Joint Task Forces. It executes tasks to support Air Force Special Operations Command (AFSOC) institutional development and advises the AFSOC commander on current and future support requirements and resourcing necessary to meet command development requirements.

== Units ==
- United States Air Force Special Operations School
- Air Commando Outreach Squadron
- 370th Special Operations Combat Training Squadron
- 371st Special Operations Combat Training Squadron

== History ==
=== Special Operations Test and Evaluation Center ===
The center was first activated at on 1 October 1983 at Hurlburt Field, Florida under Military Airlift Command as the Special Operations Test and Evaluation Center. The center conducted operational tests and evaluation of new systems and tactics. It prepared technical studies, proposed changes to doctrine and identified operational difficulties and actions to correct them. The 18th Test Squadron was its primary operational unit, operating Lockheed AC-130s.It was inactivated on 1 April 1994.

=== Air Force Special Operations Training Center ===
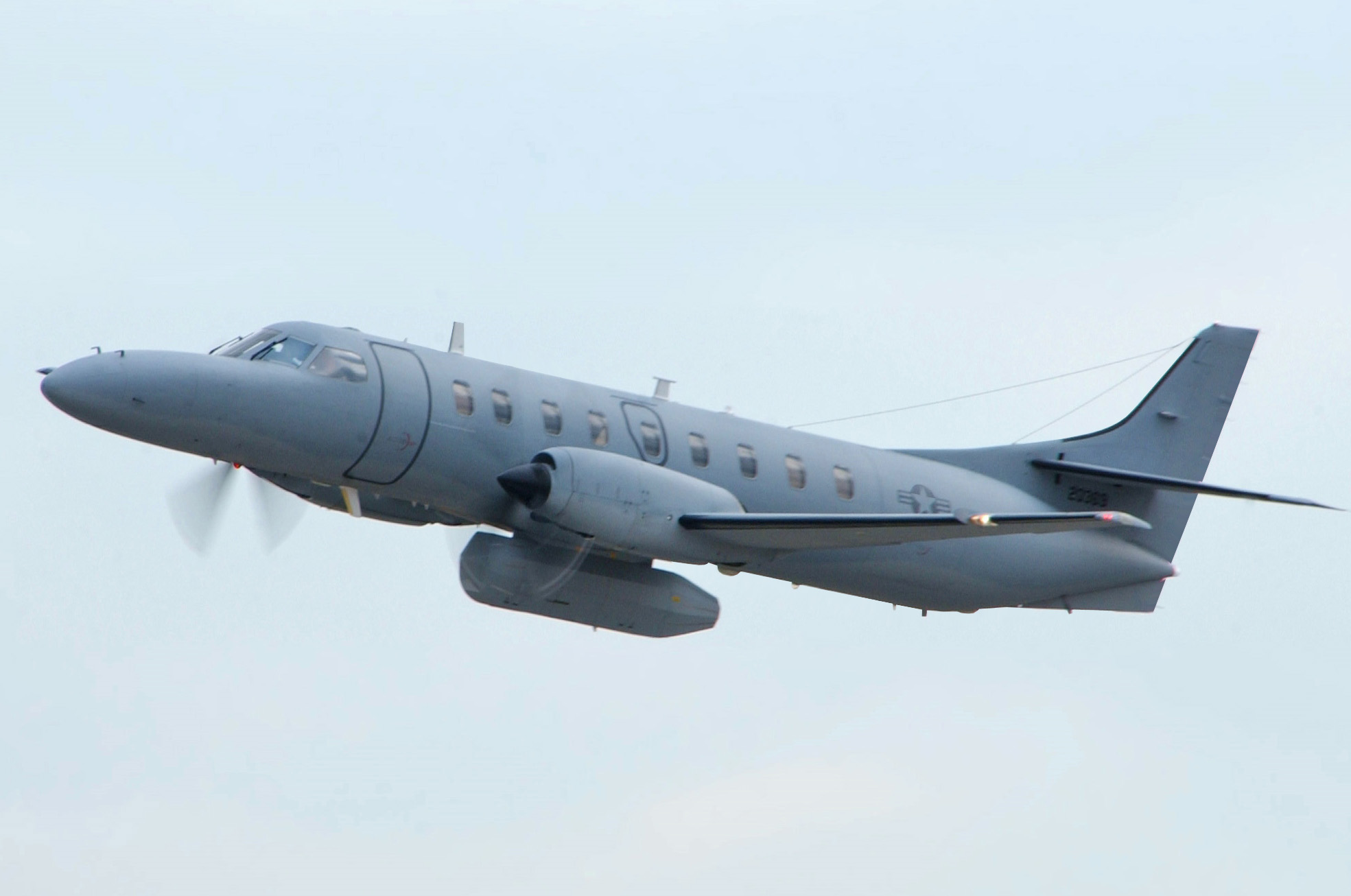
Air National Guard C-26 as flown by the center's 745th Squadron

It was redesignated the Air Force Special Operations Training Center and activated at Hurlburt as part of AFSOC on 1 October 2008. AFSOC had activated the Air Force Special Operations Training Center (Provisional) on 1 March 2008 to test the organization. The provisional unit was inactivated on 1 October.

The center consolidated multiple training functions into a single special operations training organization, allowing operational units to focus on war fighting. Its mission was to recruit, assess, select, indoctrinate, train and educate airmen for AFSOC. It brought together regular Air Force, Air Force Reserve Command, Air National Guard, Department of Defense civilians and contract personnel as an integrated training and education team.

The United States Air Force Special Operations School was AFSOC's formal school conducting special operations education and professional development. The school develops, schedules, and executes joint education for up to 7,000 students annually. It conducts resident and off-station courses in joint/combined special operations, command and control, cultural and geopolitical regional orientation, counterinsurgency, irregular warfare, and force protection. It continues this role today.

The center was inactivated on 11 February 2013, and its subordinate units transferred to the Air Force Special Operations Air Warfare Center.

=== Air Commando Development Center ===
The center was renamed the Air Commando Development Center and activated in March 2024 to conduct training for Air Force special operations forces.

Its 370th Special Operations Combat Training Squadron develops air commandos as they enter Air Force force generation joint collective training. It conducts pre-deployment mission rehearsals, and exercises training events to replicate special missions. It is responsible for experiential learning and scenario generation and execution. It conducts mission-specific and collective development through live and virtual battle spaces that enable readiness through Capability Viewpoint (CV2) of Air Force special operations elements.

Its 371st Special Operations Combat Training Squadron conducts mission ready airmen development, preparing special operations Task Units and Task Groups, and Joint Task Forces for AFSOC force generation through practical, hands-on training.

Its Air Commando Outreach Squadron's mission is to inspire young Americans to become air commandos. It uses messaging and inspirational Air Commando stories to educate and inspireyouth to consider military service, focusing on building enduring relationships with organizations, civic leaders and communities.

== Lineage ==
- Constituted as the Special Operations Test and Development Center on 23 September 1983

Activated on 1 October 1983
Inactivated on 1 April 1994

- Redesignated Air Force Special Operations Training Center on 5 September 2008

Activated on 1 October 2008
Inactivated on 11 February 2013

- Redesignated Air Commando Development Center on 29 February 2024

Activated on 5 March 2024

=== Assignments ===
- Military Airlift Command, 1 October 1983
- Air Force Special Operations Command, 22 May 1990 – 1 April 1994
- Air Force Special Operations Command, 1 October 2008 – 11 February 2013
- Air Force Special Operations Command, 5 March 2024 – present

=== Components ===
Center

- Language Center: 1 October 2008 – 11 February 2013

School

- United States Air Force Special Operations School: 1 October 2008 – 11 February 2013, 5 March 2024 – present

Squadrons

Assigned

- Air Commando Outreach Squadron: 5 March 2024 – present
- 18th Test Squadron (later 18th Flight Test Squadron): 15 July 1991 – 1 April 1994
- 551st Special Operations Squadron: 25 Jul 2009 – 11 February 2013 (Note: Stationed at Cannon Air Force Base, New Mexico.)
- 370th Special Operations Combat Training Squadron: 5 March 2024 – present
- 371st Special Operations Combat Training Squadron: 5 March 2024 – present
- 745th Special Operations Squadron (Provisional): attached c. 1 October 2008 – c. 23 August 2013 (Note: Air National Guard unit.)

Training conducted with aircraft operated by other units

- Special Tactics Training School (720th Special Tactics Group): 1 October 2008 – 11 February 2013
- 5th Special Operations Squadron (919th Special Operations Group): 1 October 2008 – 11 February 2013 (Note: Reserve unit stationed at Duke Field, Florida.)
- 19th Special Operations Squadron (1st Special Operations Group): 1 October 2008 – 11 February 2013

=== Stations ===
- Hurlburt Field, 1 October 1983 – 1 April 1994
- Hurlburt Field, 1 October 2008 – 11 February 2013
- Hurlburt Field, 5 March 2024 – present

=== Aircraft ===
- General Atomics MQ-1 Predator, 2008–2013 era
- General Atomics MQ-9 Reaper, 2008–2013 era
- Bell UH-1H Huey, 2008–2013 era
- Bell UH-1N Twin Huey, 2008–2013 era
- Mil Mi-17, 2008–2013 era
- Lockheed C-130E Hercules, 2008–2013 era
- Lockheed AC-130 (including AC-130H Spectre and AC-130U Spooky), 1991–1994, 2008–2013 era
- Lockheed MC-130W Combat Spear, 2008–2013 era
- Fairchild RC-26B, 2008–2013 era (Note: Includes aircraft assigned to other units used by the center for training.)

=== Awards ===
Award streamer	Award	Dates	Notes
	Air Force Organizational Excellence Award	1 June 1989–1 June 1991	Special Operations Test and Development Center
	Air Force Organizational Excellence Award	1 October 2008–30 September 2009	Air Force Special Operations Training Center
	Air Force Organizational Excellence Award	1 October 2009–30 September 2011	Air Force Special Operations Training Center
