= PZL M28 Skytruck =

Utility aircraft

M28 Skytruck
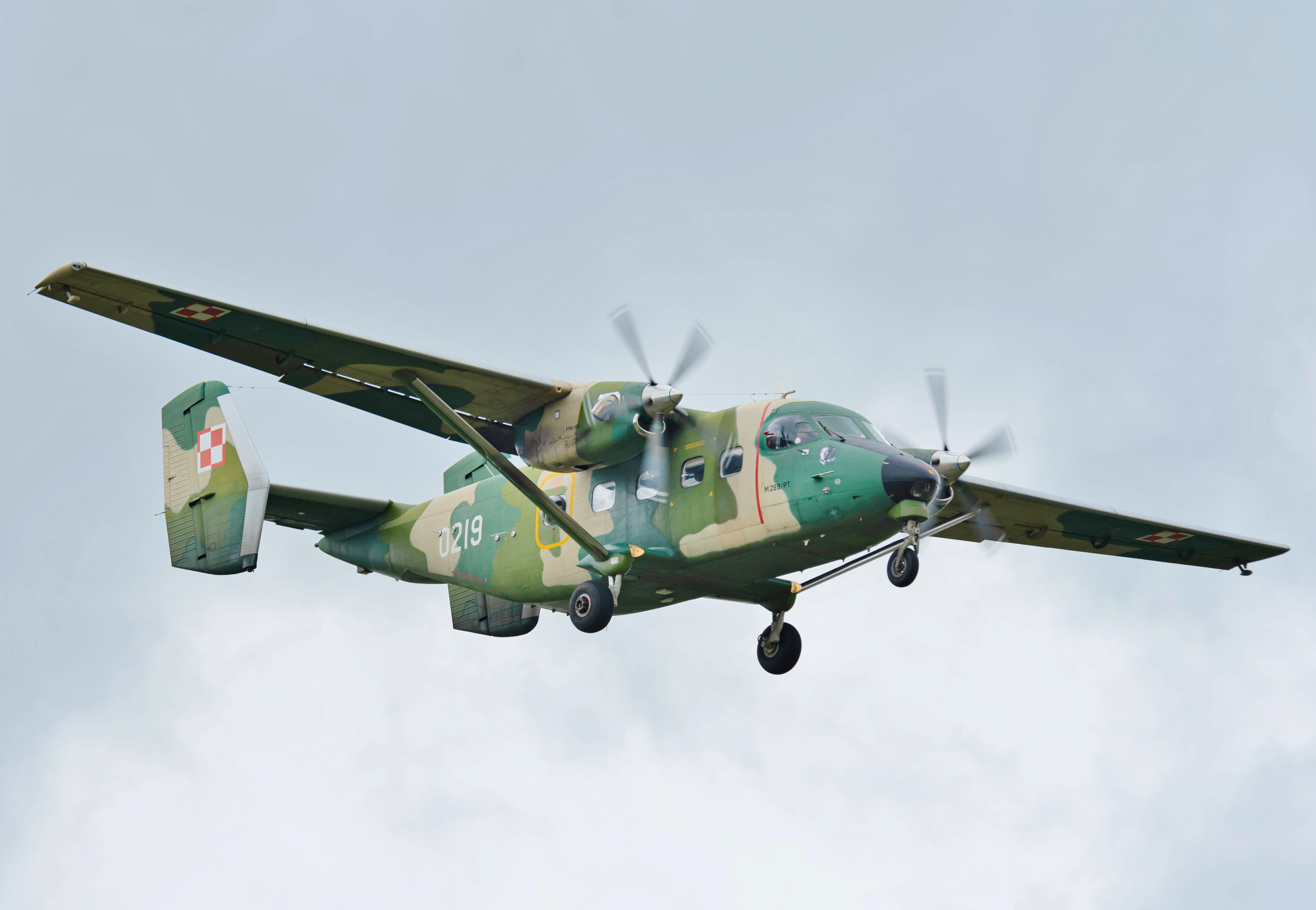
- A standard PZL M28B of Polish Air Force

General information
- Type: STOL transport, patrol and maritime reconnaissance aircraft
- Manufacturer: PZL Mielec
- Designer: Antonov/PZL Mielec
- Status: In active service
- Primary users: Polish Air Force Polish Navy; Venezuelan Army; United States Air Force
- Number built: 200+ (including PZL An-28)

History
- Manufactured: 1984-1993 (PZL An-28); 1993- (PZL M28 Skytruck)
- First flight: 22 July 1984 (PZL An-28); 24 July 1993 (PZL M28 Skytruck)
- Developed from: Antonov An-28

The PZL M28 Skytruck is a family of Polish light utility aircraft with STOL capability produced by PZL Mielec for military and civilian use. They are mainly used in transport, patrol and maritime reconnaissance roles.

The maritime patrol and reconnaissance variants are designated PZL M28B Bryza (English: Breeze), while variant in the U.S. AFSOC service is designated C-145A. The early models were built under license from the Antonov An-28 and designated PZL An-28.

== Development ==
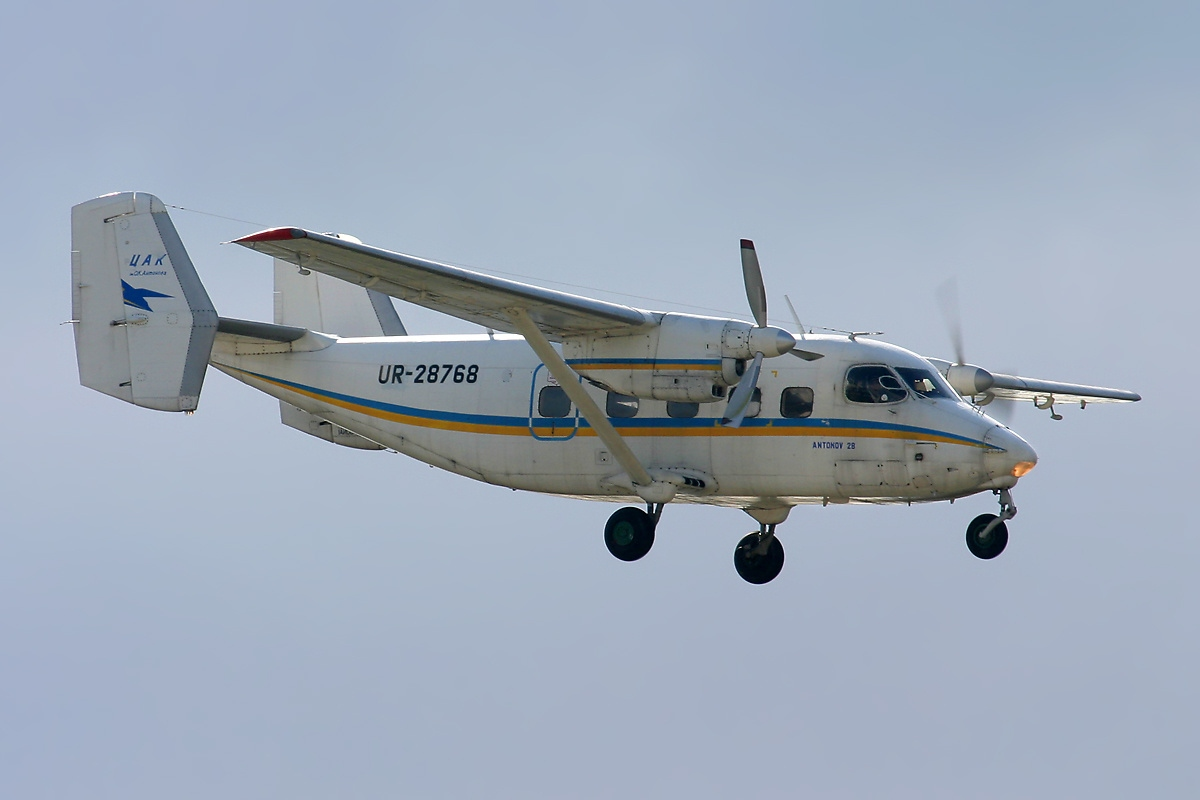
The Antonov An-28 first flew in 1969; it is produced by PZL Mielec as the M28 since 1984

The Antonov An-28 was the winner of a competition against the Beriev Be-30 for a new light passenger and utility transport for Aeroflot's short haul routes, conceived to replace the highly successful An-2 biplane. The An-28 is derived from the earlier An-14. Commonalities with the An-14 include a high wing layout, twin fins and rudders, but it differs in having a reworked and longer fuselage, with turboprop engines. The original powerplant was the TVD-850, but production versions are powered by the more powerful TVD-10B, with three-blade propellers.

The An-28 made its first flight as the An-14M in September 1969 in the USSR. A subsequent preproduction aircraft first flew in April 1975. Production of the An-28 was then transferred to Poland's PZL Mielec in 1978, although it was not until 22 July 1984 that the first Polish-built production aircraft flew. The An-28's Soviet type certificate was awarded in April 1986.

PZL Mielec has become the sole source for production An-28s. The basic variant, not differing from the Soviet one, was designated PZL An-28 and was powered with PZL-10S (licence-built TVD-10B) engines. They were built mostly for the USSR, until it collapsed. The plane was next developed by the PZL Mielec into a westernised version powered by 820 kW (1100shp) Pratt & Whitney PT6A-65B turboprops with five-blade Hartzell propellers, plus some western (BendixKing) avionics (a distinguishing feature are exhaust pipes, sticking out on sides of engine nacelles). Designated the PZL M28 Skytruck, the first flight was on 24 July 1993 and it is in limited production, mostly for export (39 produced by 2006). The type received Polish certification in March 1996, and US FAR Part 23 certificate on 19 March 2004.

Apart from the Skytruck, PZL Mielec developed a family of militarized light transport and maritime reconnaissance planes for the Polish Air Force and Polish Navy in the 1990s, with original PZL-10S engines, named PZL M28B in the Air Force and Bryza in the Navy. From 2000, newly produced M28Bs started to be equipped with five-blade propellers as well.

PZL Mielec was bought by Sikorsky in 2007. Purchased primarily to produce helicopter structures, the company also produces 10 M28s per year. Sikorsky's current owner, Lockheed Martin, has marketed it to the governments of Indonesia, Jordan, Poland, Venezuela, Vietnam, the U.S. and commercial operators. Split equally between commercial and military applications, it competes with the Viking Air Twin Otter, the Let 410 and the Dornier 228.

== Design ==
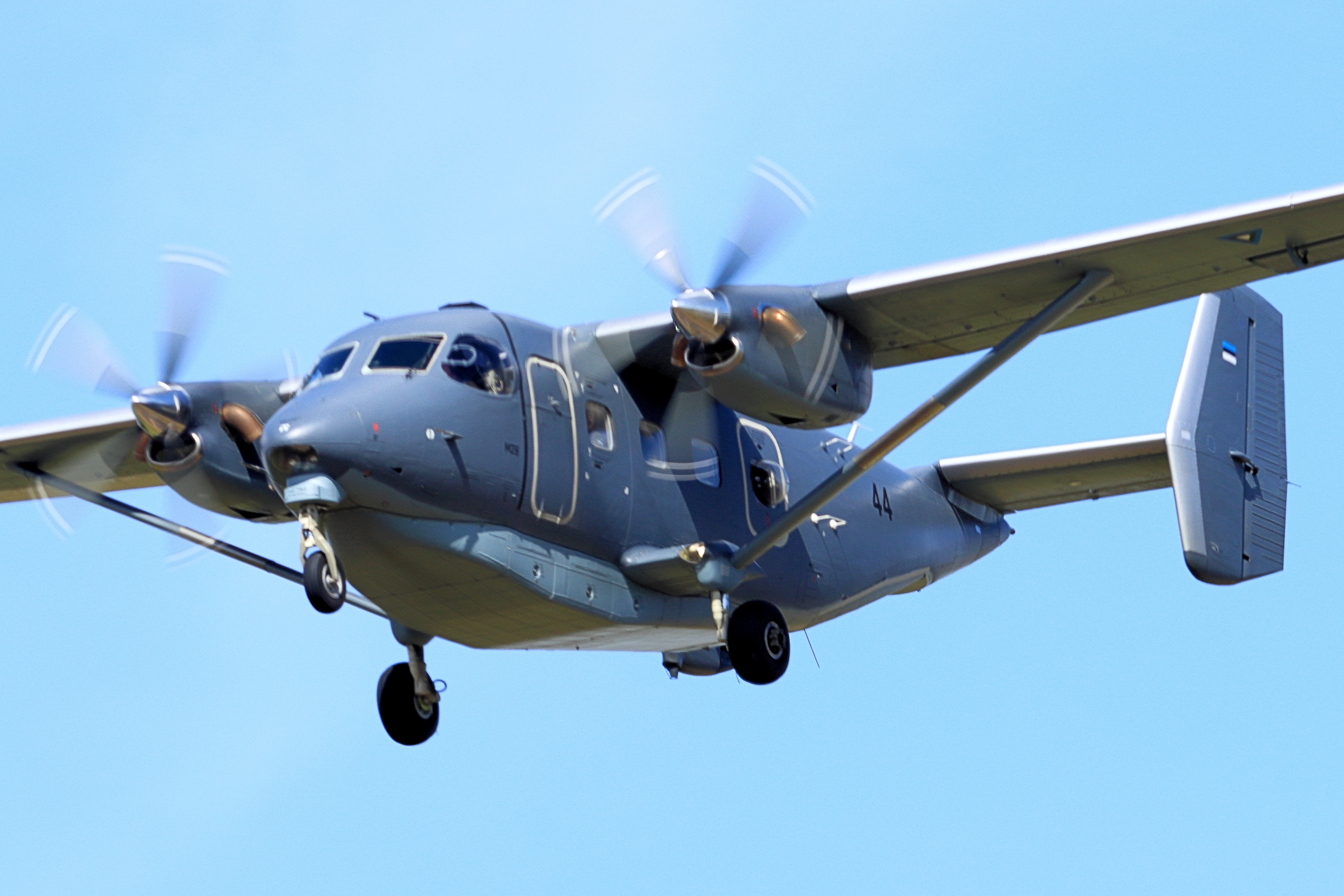
Strutted high-wing, twin vertical fins and tricycle landing gear

The M28 is a twin-engined high-wing strutted monoplane with an all-metal airframe, twin vertical fins and a tricycle fixed landing gear. If an engine fails, a spoiler forward of the aileron opens automatically on the opposite wing. This limits the wing drop to 12° in five seconds instead of 30°.

It is capable of Short takeoff & landing (STOL) and hot and high altitude operations. Aerodynamically deployed leading edge slats when approaching stall speed enable a 64 kn (119 km/h) low stall speed and while the certification landing field is 1,640 ft (500 m), PZL has demonstrated landing in 512 ft (156 m). Inlet air ducts inertial separators and inverted configuration of the PT6 and the high wing configuration protect the engines and propellers against foreign object damage for unprepared runways operations.

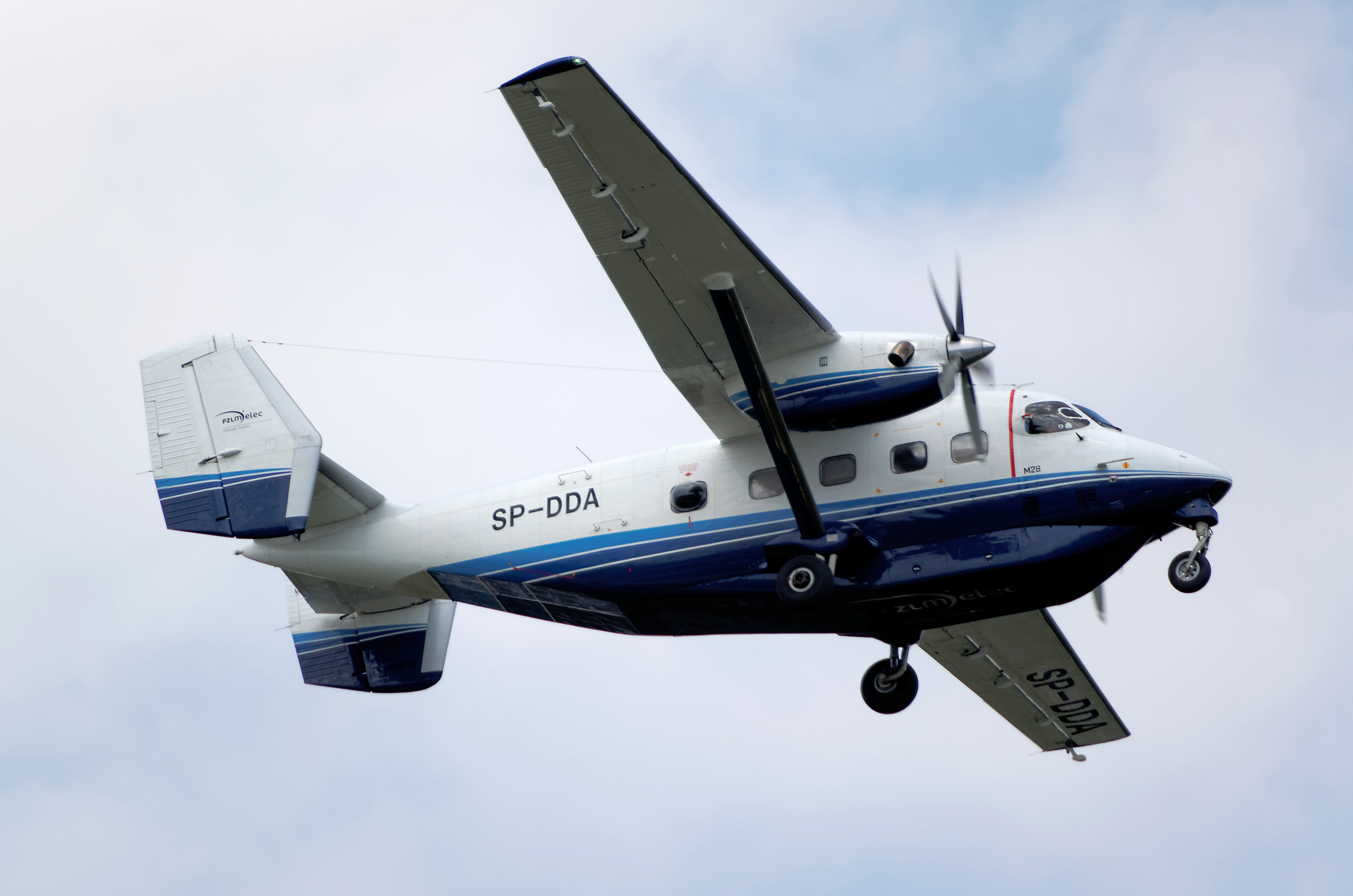
M28 with underbelly luggage pod

Multiple configurations are available: a 19-passenger airliner with 2-1 seating and an underbelly luggage pod; a cargo aircraft with a 1,540 lb (700 kg) hand-cranked hoist option; the most common combi; a VIP transport; a medevac for six litters and seven seats; a search-and-rescue version; a 17-seat paratrooper drop version; an 18-passenger utility cabin and an aerial firefighting version is considered. A crew of two can switch between passenger and cargo configurations in 7 min. Its inward opening rear doors allow for cargo drops and utility operations as well as the passenger boarding.

It can take off in 1,800 ft (550 m) at the 16,534 lb (7,500 kg) MTOW. Maximum payload is 5,070 lb (2,300 kg), it can carry 5,000 lb (2,300 kg) over 100 nmi (190 km) or 2,500 lb (1,100 kg) with full fuel over 700 nmi (1,300 km).

== Operational history ==
176 An-28s and M28s in all variants were built in Poland by 2006. Most numerous users are former Soviet civil aviation and the Polish Air Force and Navy (about 25 as of 2006), smaller numbers are used by the Polish civil aviation and in the United States, Nepal, Colombia, Venezuela, Vietnam and Indonesia.

On 12 February 2009, the weekly periodical Air Force Times reported that the Air Force Special Operations Command (AFSOC) would receive 10 PZL M28 Skytrucks in June 2009. These aircraft carry the U.S. Air Force model design series (MDS) designation of C-145A Skytruck. In 2011 one aircraft crash landed in Afghanistan and was damaged beyond repair. 11 of AFSOC's C-145As were retired in 2015. In 2016, three were sent to Kenya, two to Costa Rica, two to Nepal, and two to Estonia.

On 15 December 2022, the 711th Special Operations Squadron retired the C-145A from U.S. service.

== Variants ==
=== Airframe variants ===
PZL An-28
Original variant, built under Antonov licence, with PZL-10S (licensed TV-10B) engines.
PZL M28 Skytruck
Development variant with redesigned fuselage and wings, new Pratt & Whitney Canada engines, new (western) avionics, 5-blade rotors, and some other minor changes.
PZL M28B Bryza
Militarized variants used by Polish Air Force and Polish Navy, similar to Skytruck, but with PZL-10S engines. Uses partially retracting landing gear to avoid interfering with its radar.
PZL M28+ Skytruck Plus
Prototype of new lengthened variant with more internal space, not in production.
C-145A

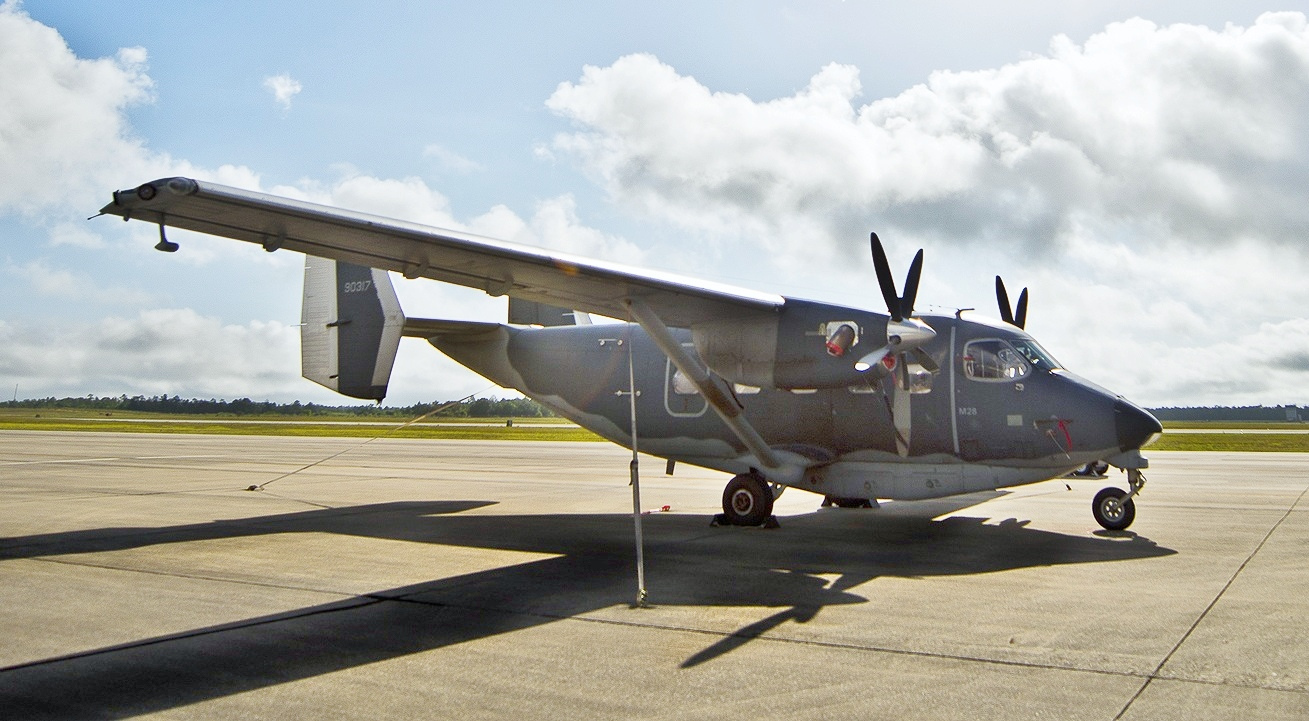
C-145A of AFSOC

Variant previously flown by USAF Special Operations Command. Similar to Skytruck, but with Pratt and Whitney PT6A-65B Turboprops. The USAF has started retiring the aircraft, with the first aircraft, AF Ser. No. 08-0310, delivered to the 309th Aerospace Maintenance and Regeneration Group at Davis-Monthan AFB, Arizona on 28 May 2015. By June 2015 eleven out of 16 aircraft were stored. The last C-145As were retired from USAF service in December 2022.
MC-145B Wily Coyote
In May 2021, the U.S. Special Operations Command (SOCOM) awarded a contract to Sierra Nevada Corporation (SNC) to demonstrate the MC-145B as part of the Armed Overwatch program, which is seeking to acquire a new crewed light attack aircraft to support U.S. special operations forces in permissive environments. Renderings of the proposed aircraft depict a pair of sensor turrets (one under the nose and the other under the fuselage) as well as a pair of underwing hardpoints on each side (total four) outboard of the wing struts. Internally, eight reloadable Common Launch Tubes (CLT) are provided as well as a ramp-launch capability.

=== Variants in use by Polish military ===
PZL An-28TD
Basic transport variant. Used mainly for transport and paratroop training (2 built).
PZL M28B
Several similar improved transport variants featuring avionics and airframe upgrades: Bryza 1TD (2 built), M28B (3 built), M28B Salon (1 built), M28B TDII, TDIII and TDIV (2 built of each).

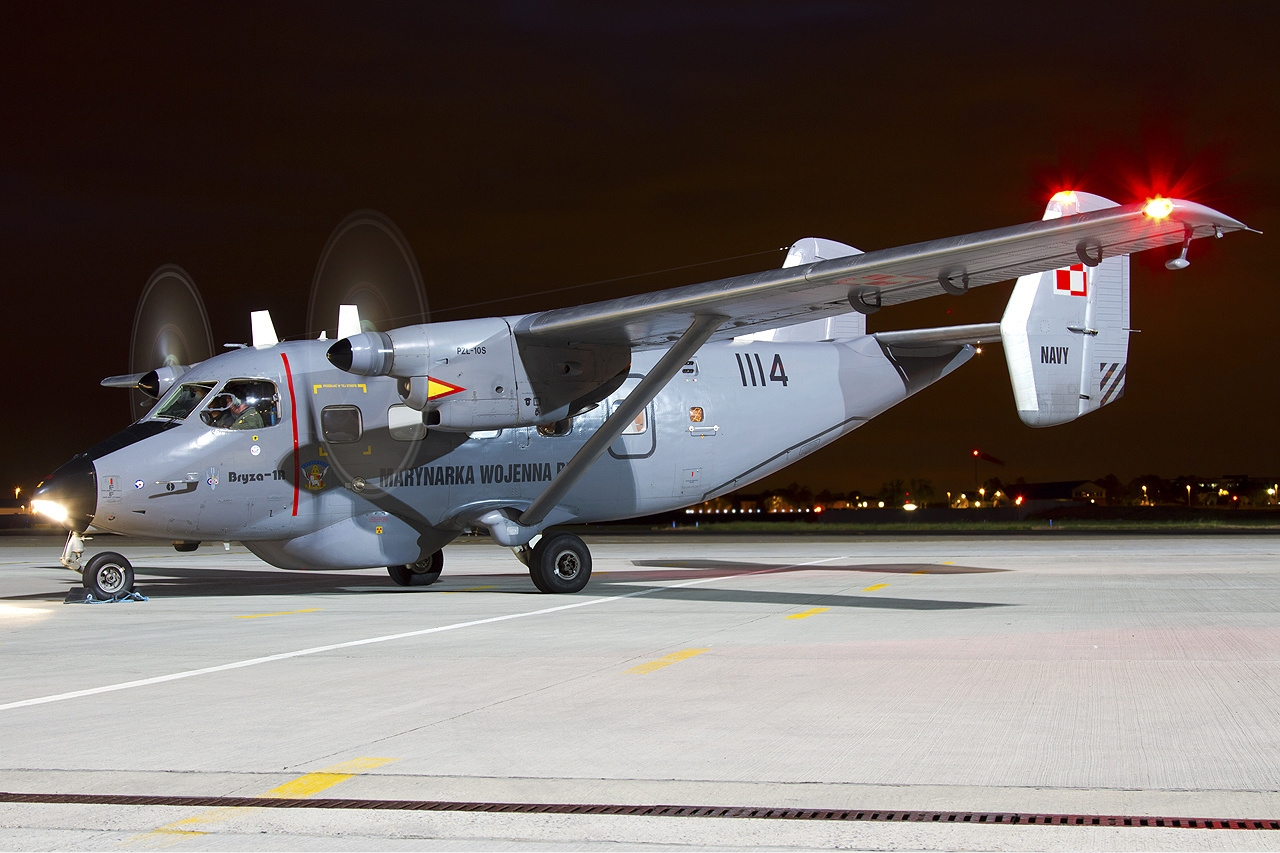
M28B Bryza 1R with underside radome

PZL M28B Bryza 1R
Maritime patrol and reconnaissance variant (equipped with an ASR-400 360° Search and Surveillance Radar, Link-11 datalink). Used mainly for sea border patrol tasks, search and rescue operations and protection of the national economical sea zone (7 built).
PZL M28B Bryza 1E
The maritime ecological reconnaissance and patrol variant used for maritime and coastal patrol, ecological protection, pollution (e.g. oil spill) monitoring, and tracking the movement of ships and smaller vessels.

This variant is equipped with a radome under the belly housing the Ericsson MSS-5000 observation system, consisting of two side-looking airborne radars (SLAR), EO/IR sensor and IR/UV line scanners. The two SLAR radars each have a range of 80 km for a combined swath width of 160 km, allowing for digital imaging of tracked objects. The sub-hull scanner allows the thickness of the pollution layer to be studied and mapped, while the optical and video systems allow digital imaging of the situation at sea.

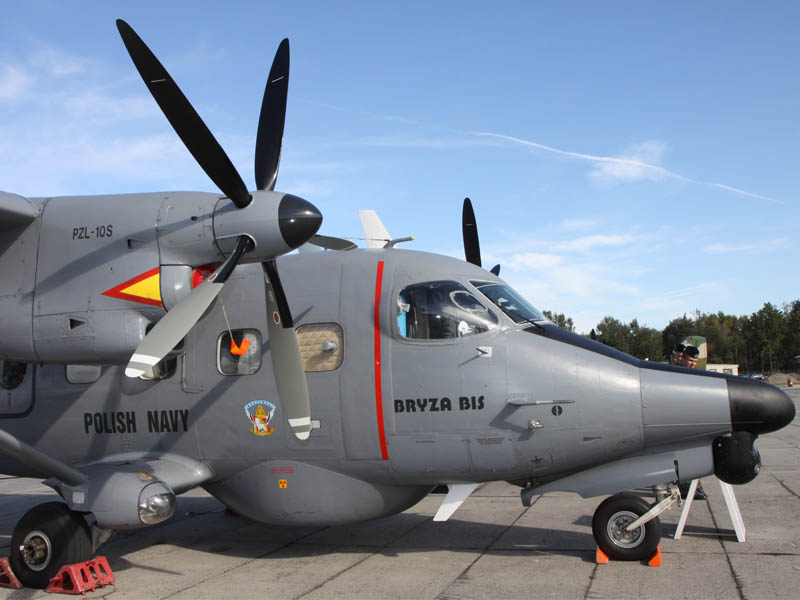
M28B Bryza 1RM bis

PZL M28B Bryza 1RM bis
Maritime patrol and reconnaissance variant with submarine detection capability, of 2004 (equipped with an ARS-800-2 360° Search and Surveillance Radar, a Link-11 datalink, single-use hydro-acoustic sonobuoy launchers, FLIR, and a magnetic anomaly detector). Used mainly for maritime border patrol tasks, search and rescue operations and the protection of the national maritime economic zone (1 built as of 2006).
PZL M28 05 Skytruck
Maritime patrol and SAR variant for the Polish Border Guard, of 2006 (equipped with Search and Surveillance Radar ARS-400M and FLIR system) (1 built as of 2006).

== Operators ==
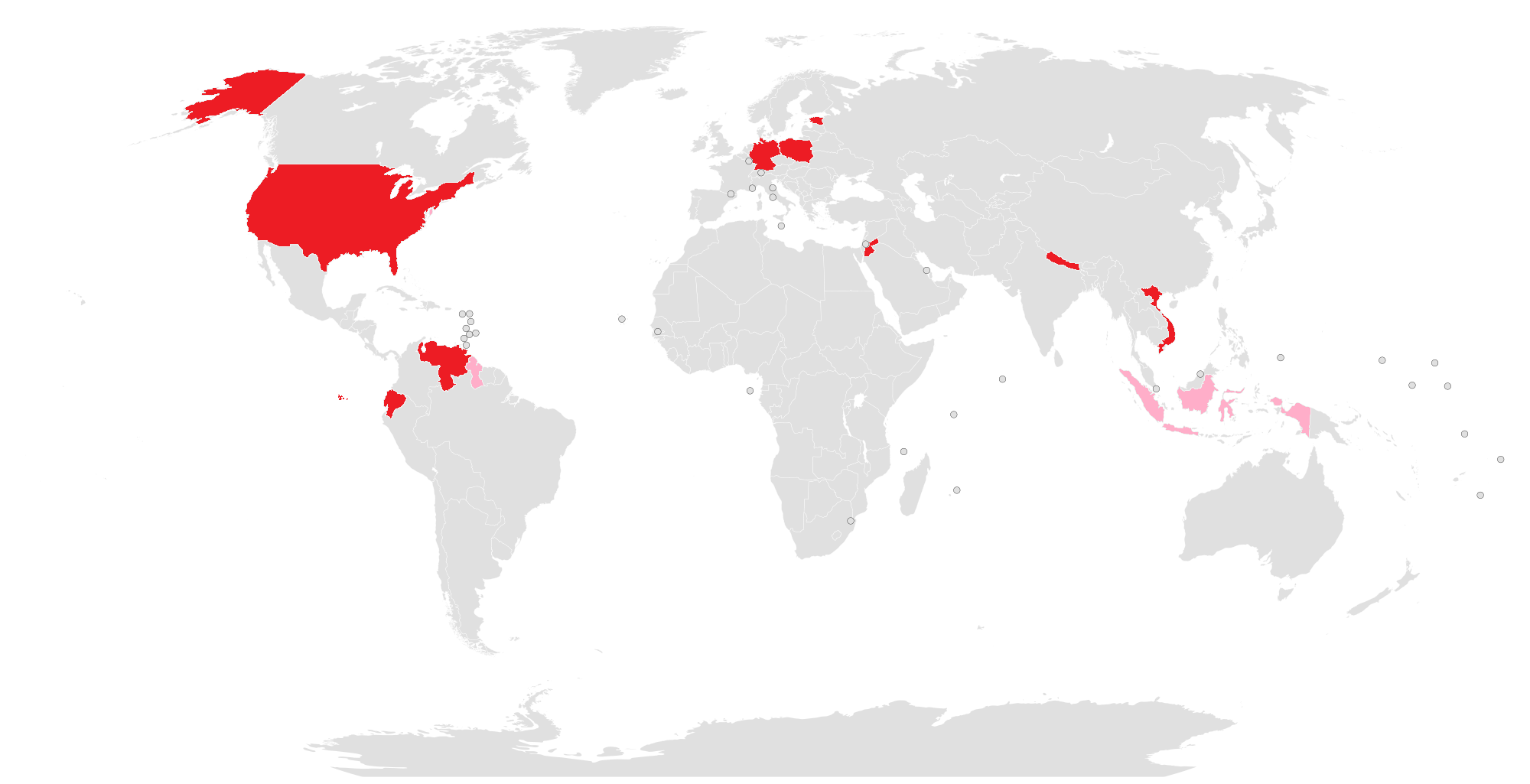
PZL M28 operators (civil in pink)

=== Civil operators ===
Germany

- PD Sicherheit, German defense training contractor, received three aircraft in 2019.

Guyana

- JAGS Aviation Guyana operates one aircraft.

Indonesia

- Indonesian National Police operates four aircraft.

United States

- Sierra Nevada Corporation operates two aircraft.
- Arizona Department of Public Safety operates two aircraft.

=== Military operators ===
Costa Rica

- Air Vigilance Service received two aircraft from the US in 2018

Ecuador

- Ecuadorian Army has one in service as of September 2018, purchased to replace crashed IAI Arava.

Estonia

- Estonian Air Force received two ex C-145A donated by the US Air Force, first received in March 2019.

Germany

- Luftwaffe leased two aircraft from private company PD Sicherheit for use in paratrooper training since 2017

Jordan

- Royal Jordanian Air Force
  - No.3 Squadron RJAF received three aircraft in 2014 of which one is used for electronic warfare

Kenya

- Kenyan Air Force received the first M28 from the US in February 2021 and second in June 2021. Third one is expected to be delivered in near future Commissioned into service in April 2021.

Nepal

- Nepalese Army Air Service received three (with further two on order)

Poland

- Polish Air Force operates 25 aircraft.
- Polish Navy operates 16 aircraft.
- Polish Border Guard operates one aircraft.

United States

- United States Air Force
  - Air Force Special Operations Command
    - 318th Special Operations Squadron (2007–2013)
    - 6th Special Operations Squadron (2012–2022)
  - Air Force Reserve Command
    - 711th Special Operations Squadron (2013–2022)

Venezuela

- Venezuelan Army operates 12 aircraft.
- Venezuelan National Guard operates 13 aircraft.

Vietnam

- Vietnam People's Air Force operate one aircraft in a maritime patrol configuration

== Accidents and incidents ==
- On 12 July 2001, an M28 crashed in Puerto Cabello, Venezuela due to pilot error, killing all on board, including the president of PZL Mielec.
- On 4 November 2005, a Vietnamese Airforce M28 crashed in Gia Lam district, Hanoi. All three crewmembers were killed.
- On 28 October 2010, an Indonesian Police-operated M28 crashed in the Nabire region of the Indonesian state of Papua, killing five people.
- On 3 December 2016, a PZL Skytruck belonging to the Indonesian National Police crashed into the ocean in Dabo, Riau Islands while carrying 13 people. All 13 people on board were killed in the accident. Eyewitnesses stated that the aircraft had suffered an in-flight failure and claimed that the engine of the plane was emitting black smoke.
- On 30 May 2017, a PZL Skytruck belonging to the Nepal Army with registration NA-048 crashed at Bajura-based Kolti airport while its pilot was trying to land the aircraft. The cargo airplane was supposed to land on the Simikot airport in Humla district. However, bad weather condition forced the pilot to divert towards Bajura. The pilot of the aircraft died while two others were injured.

== Specifications (PZL M28) ==
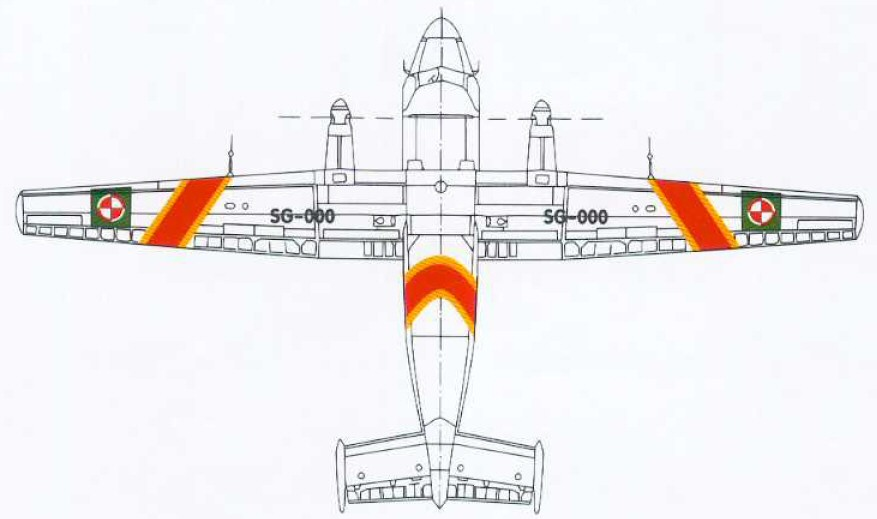

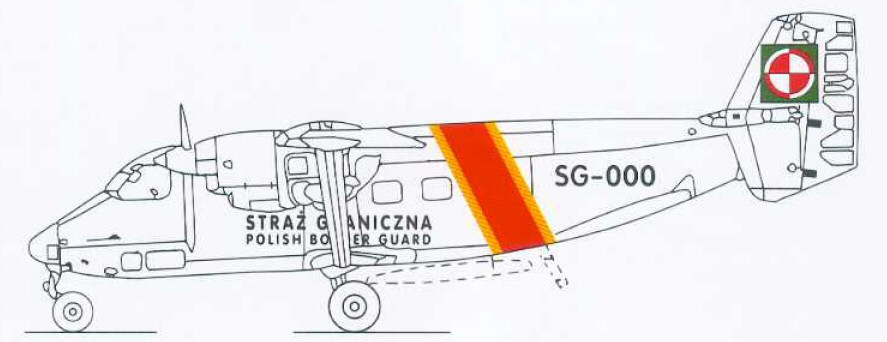

Data from PZL Mielec

General characteristics

- Crew: 2
- Capacity: 19 passengers (17 paratroopers) or 2,300 kg (5,071 lb)
- Length: 13.1 m (43 ft 0 in)
- Wingspan: 22.06 m (72 ft 5 in)
- Height: 4.9 m (16 ft 1 in)
- Cabin length: 5.26 m (17 ft)
- Cabin width: 1.74 m (5 ft 9 in)
- Cabin height: 1.72 m (5 ft 8 in)
- Cabin volume: 13.73 m^{2} (148 sq ft)
- Wing area: 39.72 m^{2} (427.5 sq ft)
- Aspect ratio: 12.25
- Airfoil: TsAGI R-II-14 (14%)
- Empty weight: 4,354 kg (9,599 lb)
- Max takeoff weight: 7,500 kg (16,535 lb)
- Fuel capacity: 1,766 kg (3,893 lb) / 2,278 L (602 US gal; 501 imp gal)
- Powerplant: 2 × Pratt & Whitney Canada PT6A-65B turboprop engines, 820 kW (1,100 hp) each
- Propellers: Hartzell HC-B5MP-3D10876ASK
- Propellers: 2.83 m (9 ft 3 in) diameter five-blade fully feathering reversible constant-speed propellers

Performance

- Maximum speed: 355 km/h (221 mph, 192 kn)
- Cruise speed: 244 km/h (152 mph, 132 kn)
- Stall speed: 120 km/h (75 mph, 65 kn)
- Minimum control speed: 153 km/h (95 mph, 83 kn) (V_{MCA})
- Range: 1,592 km (989 mi, 860 nmi) at 3,000 m (9,800 ft)) with 45 min. reserve
- Ferry range: 3,100 km (1,900 mi, 1,700 nmi) with ferry tanks in the cabin
- Endurance: 6.2 h (3,000 m (10,000 ft), 45 min reserve)
- Service ceiling: 7,620 m (25,000 ft)
- g limits: +3/-1
- Rate of climb: 12.29 m/s (2,400 ft/min)
- Time to altitude: 3,000 m (9,800 ft) in 6 minutes with air bleed off (9 min with air bleed on)
- Take-off run: 494 m (1,620 ft)
- Landing run: 250 m (820 ft)
- Fuel consumption: 268 kg/h (591 lb/h)

== See also ==
Related development

- Antonov An-14
- Antonov An-28

Aircraft of comparable role, configuration, and era

- CASA C-212
- Cessna 408 SkyCourier
- de Havilland Canada DHC-6 Twin Otter
- Dornier 228
- GAF Nomad
- Harbin Y-12
- IAI Arava
- Indonesian Aerospace N-219
- Let L-410 Turbolet
- Shorts Skyvan
