= 97th Airlift Squadron =

97th Airlift Squadron

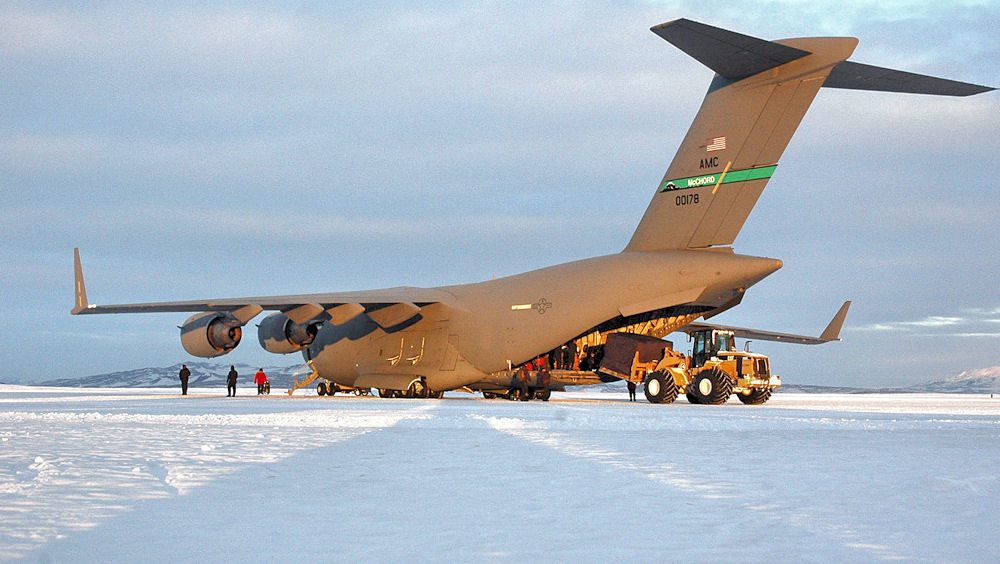
- C-17 Globemaster III from McChord Air Force Base at McMurdo Station, Antarctica
- Active: 1943–1945; 1947–1951; 1952–1957; 1957–present
- Country: United States
- Branch: United States Air Force
- Role: Airlift
- Part of: Air Force Reserve Command
- Garrison/HQ: Joint Base Lewis-McChord
- Nickname: Fightin' Roos
- Engagements: European Theater of Operations; Desert Storm
- Decorations: Distinguished Unit Citation; Air Force Meritorious Unit Award; Air Force Outstanding Unit Award; Republic of Vietnam Gallantry Cross with Palm

Insignia
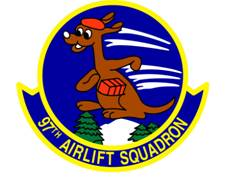
- 97th Airlift Squadron emblem (approved 26 August 1960)

The 97th Airlift Squadron is a United States Air Force Reserve squadron, assigned to the 446th Operations Group, stationed at Joint Base Lewis-McChord, Washington. It is a USAF Associate Unit of the active duty 4th Airlift Squadron, 62d Airlift Wing.

== Overview ==
The squadron operates McDonnell Douglas C-17 Globemaster III aircraft supporting the United States Air Force global reach mission worldwide.

== History ==
=== World War II ===
Activated in July 1943 as an I Troop Carrier Command Douglas C-47 Skytrain Squadron. After training in the United States, at various bases, sent to Baer Field, Indiana for final equipping with aircraft, personnel and other equipment. Deployed to IX Troop Carrier Command in February 1944 during the build-up prior to the Invasion of France.

During the D-Day Invasion, the squadron dropped paratroops of the 101st Airborne Division in Normandy, subsequently flying numerous missions to bring in reinforcements and needed supplies. During the airborne attack on The Netherlands (Operation Market Garden, September 1944), the squadron dropped paratroops, towed gliders, and flew resupply missions. Later participated in the invasion of southern France in August 1944. The squadron supported the 101st Airborne Division in the Battle of the Bulge by towing gliders full of supplies near Bastogne on 27 December 1944. In addition, its units participated in the air assault across the Rhine River in early 1945 (Operation Varsity) and later flew numerous freight missions to carry gasoline, food, medicine, and other supplies to allied ground forces during the Western Allied invasion of Germany in April 1945 near Wesel. The squadron also hauled food, clothing, medicine, gasoline, ordnance equipment, and other supplies to the front lines and evacuated patients to rear zone hospitals. It transported displaced persons from Germany to France and Belgium after V-E Day. Remained in Europe during the summer of 1945, inactivating as part of the United States Air Forces in Europe, October 1945.

=== Reserve operations and mobilization for the Korean War ===
Reactivated in the reserve as a Curtiss C-46 Commando troop carrier squadron in Minneapolis, Minnesota during 1947. Was federalized as a result of the Korean War in 1951, squadron personnel and aircraft being sent to active-duty units as fillers, inactivated as an administrative unit a few days later.

=== Return to reserve operations ===
Reactivated after the Korean War as a reserve fighter-bomber squadron in 1952 initially equipped with North American F-51 Mustangs, later upgraded to Lockheed F-80 Shooting Star jet aircraft. Redesignated back to a troop carrier squadron in . Carried out theater transport operations and supported Air Force and Army units with troop carrier missions. Was activated during the 1962 Cuban Missile Crisis, carried Army units to South Florida in preparation of a possible invasion of Cuba. Returned Army personnel to home stations after situation was normalized and returned to reserve service.

The squadron flew airlift missions worldwide, including to Southeast Asia during the Vietnam War and to Southwest Asia during the Gulf War. It has also participated in training exercises, some involving the dropping or landing of airborne troops.

The squadron has conducted worldwide airlift including Supporting contingency operations in Panama, 1989–1990, and in southwest Asia, 1990–1991.

=== Campaigns and decorations ===
- Campaigns: World War II: Rome-Arno; Normandy; Northern France; Southern France; Rhineland; Ardennes-Alsace; Central Europe. Southwest Asia: Defense of Saudi Arabia; Liberation and Defense of Kuwait.
- Decorations: Distinguished Unit Citation: France, 6–7 June 1944. Air Force Outstanding Unit Awards: 23 December 1964 – 22 January 1965; 26 January 1968 – 1 June 1969; 1 July 1969 – 30 June 1970; 1 July 1973-30 June 1974; 1 September 1982 – 31 August 1984; 1 August 1990 – 31 July 1992. Republic of Vietnam Gallantry Cross with Palm, 1 April 1966 – 28 January 1973.

== Lineage ==
- Constituted as the 97th Troop Carrier Squadron on 25 May 1943

Activated on 1 July 1943
Inactivated on 18 October 1945

- Activated in the reserve on 15 September 1947

Redesignated 97th Troop Carrier Squadron, Medium on 27 June 1949
Ordered to active duty on 1 May 1951
Inactivated on 4 May 1951

- Redesignated 97th Fighter-Bomber Squadron on 26 May 1952

Activated in the reserve on 15 June 1952
Inactivated on 1 July 1957

- Redesignated 97th Troop Carrier Squadron, Medium on 24 October 1957

Activated in the Reserve on 16 November 1957
Ordered to active duty on 28 October 1962
Relieved from active duty on 28 November 1962
Redesignated 97th Air Transport Squadron, Heavy on 1 December 1965
Redesignated 97th Military Airlift Squadron on 1 January 1966
Ordered to active duty on 26 January 1968
Relieved from active duty on 2 June 1969
Redesignated 97th Military Airlift Squadron (Associate) on 25 July 1969
Redesignated 97th Airlift Squadron (Associate) on 1 February 1992
Redesignated 97th Airlift Squadron on 1 October 1994

=== Assignments ===
- 440th Troop Carrier Group, 1 July 1943 – 18 October 1945
- 440th Troop Carrier Group, 15 September 1947 – 4 May 1951
- 440th Fighter-Bomber Group, 15 June 1952 – 1 July 1957
- 440th Troop Carrier Group, 16 November 1957
- 349th Troop Carrier Group, 25 March 1958
- 349th Troop Carrier Wing, 14 April 1959
- 941st Troop Carrier Group (later 941st Air Transport Group, 941st Military Airlift) Group, 11 February 1963
- 939th Military Airlift Group, 25 July 1969
- 446th Military Airlift Wing (later 446th Airlift Wing), 1 July 1973
- 446th Operations Group, 1 August 1992 – present

=== Stations ===
- Baer Field, Indiana, 1 July 1943
- Sedalia Army Air Field, Missouri, 9 July 1943
- Alliance Army Air Field, Nebraska, 7 September 1943
- Pope Field, North Carolina, 4 January 1944
- Baer Field, Indiana, 14–21 February 1944
- RAF Bottesford (AAF-481), England, 8 March 1944
- RAF Exeter (AAF-463), England, 26 April 1944 (operated from Ombrone Airfield, Italy, 18 July–24 August 1944)
- Reims/Champagne Airfield (A-62), France, 13 September 1944
- Le Mans Airfield (A-35), France, 28 September 1944
- Orleans/Bricy Airfield (A-50), 4 November 1944 – 18 October 1945
- Wold-Chamberlain Field, Minnesota, 9 April 1947 – 4 May 1951
- Fort Snelling, Minnesota, 15 June 1952
- Minneapolis-St Paul International Airport, Minnesota, 8 January 1953 – 1 July 1957
- O'Hare International Airport, Illinois, 16 November 1957
- Paine Air Force Base, Washington, 25 March 1958
- McChord Air Force Base (later Joint Base Lewis-McChord), Washington, 9 November 1965 – present

=== Aircraft ===
- Aeronca L-3 Grasshopper (1943–1945)
- Douglas C-47 Skytrain (1943–1945, 1948)
- Douglas C-54 Skymaster (1943–1945)
- Consolidated C-109 Liberator Express (1943–1945)
- Curtiss C-46 Commando (1949–1951, 1952–1957)
- Beechcraft T-7 Navigator (1950–1951)
- Beechcraft T-11 Kansan (1947–1951)
- North American T-6 Texan (1948–1951, 1952–1955)
- North American F-51 Mustang (1953–1954)
- Lockheed F-80 Shooting Star (1954–1957)
- Lockheed T-33 T-Bird (1954–1957)
- Fairchild C-119 Flying Boxcar (1957–1965)
- Douglas C-124 Globemaster II (1965–1969)
- Lockheed C-141 Starlifter (1969–2003)
- McDonnell Douglas C-17 Globemaster III (2003–present)
