= 708th Airlift Squadron =

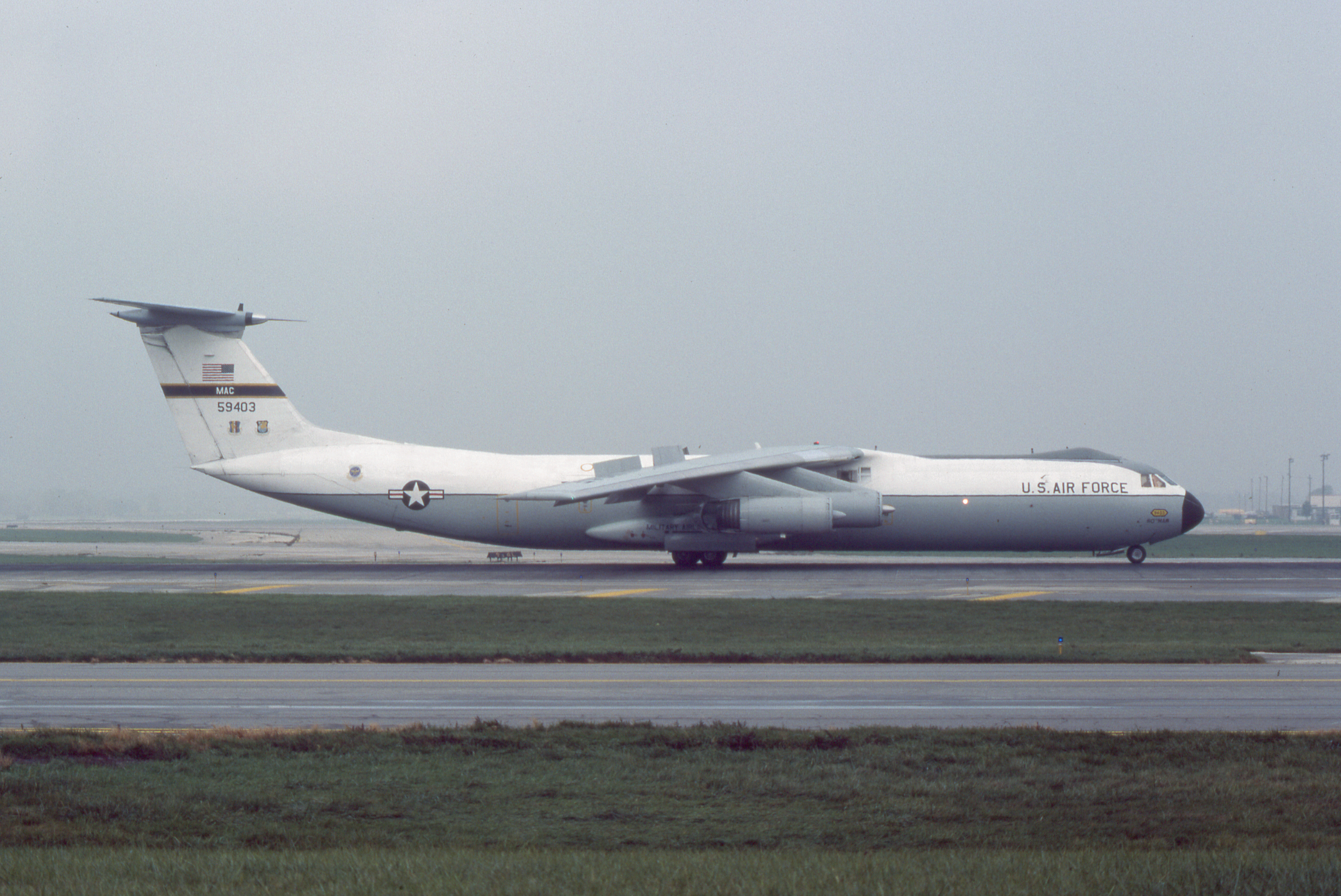
- C-141 Starlifter of the 60th and 349th Airlift Wings (Note: Aircraft is Lockheed C141A-LM Starlifter, serial 65-9403. It was converted to C-141B. Sent to the Aerospace Maintenance and Regeneration Center on 8 June 2000, broken up on 19 September 2003. Baugher, Joe (9 February 2023). "1965 USAF Serial Numbers". Joe Baugher.)
- Active: 1943–1944; 1972–1996
- Country: United States
- Branch: United States Air Force
- Role: Airlift
- Motto(s): Global Reserve

Insignia
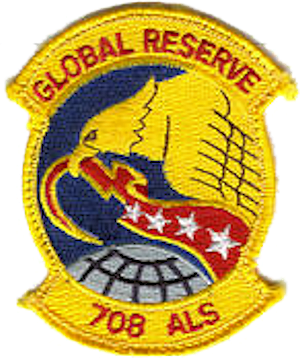
- Patch with 708th Airlift Squadron emblem

The 708th Airlift Squadron is an inactive United States Air Force Reserve unit. It was last assigned to the 349th Operations Group at Travis Air Force Base, California, where it was inactivated on 30 September 1996.

The squadron was active during World War II as the 308th Troop Carrier Squadron a training unit that was part of the I Troop Carrier Command.

It was activated in 1972 as an associate unit, flying aircraft assigned to the regular Air Force 60th Military Airlift Wing.

== History ==
=== World War II ===
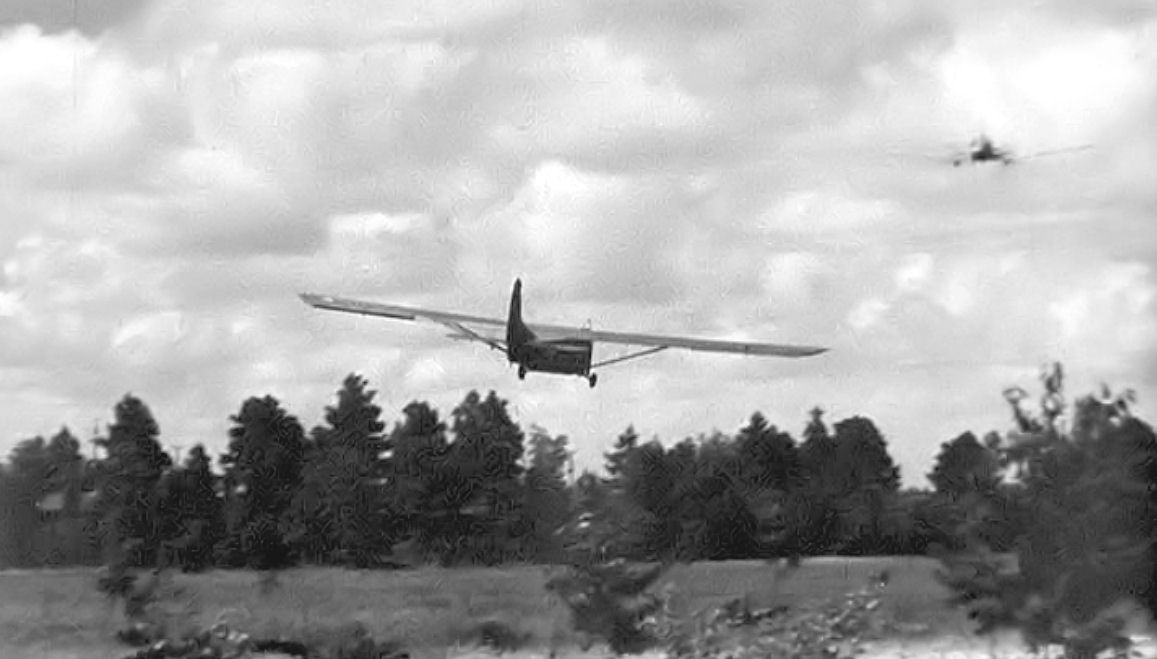
C-17 Skytrain with CG-4 glider in tow

The 308th Troop Carrier Squadron was activated at Baer Field, Indiana as an Operational Training Unit (OTU) in March 1943 and equipped with Douglas C-47 Skytrains and Douglas C-53 Skytroopers. It served in this role until July 1943. The OTU program involved the use of an oversized parent unit to provide cadres to "satellite groups". The OTU program was patterned after the unit training system of the Royal Air Force. It then assumed responsibility for their training and oversaw their expansion with graduates of Army Air Forces Training Command schools to become effective combat units. Phase I training concentrated on individual training in crewmember specialties. Phase II training emphasized the coordination for the crew to act as a team. The final phase concentrated on operation as a unit.

However, most units had been activated. Training “fillers” for existing units became more important than unit training. The 308th then served as a Replacement Training Unit (RTU) for glider crews until April 1944. RTUs were oversized units to train individual pilots or aircrews.

However, the United States Army Air Forces found that standard military units lke the 308th, based on relatively inflexible tables of organization were proving less well adapted to the training mission. Accordingly, a more functional system was adopted in which each base was organized into a separate numbered unit. Accordingly, the 308th was disbanded and its mission, personnel, and equipment were absorbed by the 805th AAF Base Unit (Replacement Training Unit, Troop Carrier).

=== Reserve associate operations ===
The 708th Military Airlift Squadron was activated at Travis Air Force Base, California in 1972 as an Air Force Reserve associate squadron. The squadron did not have aircraft assigned, but flew Lockheed C-141 Starlifter aircraft assigned to the regular United States Air Force 60th Military Airlift Wing (later 60th Airlift Wing). The squadron was inactivated in 1996 as part of phaseout of C-141s.

== Lineage ==
308th Troop Carrier Squadron

- Constituted as the 308th Troop Carrier Squadron on 15 March 1943

Activated on 15 March 1943
Disbanded on 14 April 1944

- Reconstituted on 19 September 1985 and consolidated with the 708th Military Airlift Squadron as the 708th Military Airlift Squadron

708th Airlift Squadron

- Constituted as the 708th Military Airlift Squadron (Associate) on 18 October 1971

Activated on 1 October 1972

- Consolidated on 19 September 1985 with 308th Troop Carrier Squadron

Redesignated 708th Airlift Squadron (Associate) on 1 February 1992
Redesignated 708th Airlift Squadron on 1 October 1994
Inactivated on 30 September 1996

=== Assignments ===
- 10th Troop Carrier Group, 15 March 1943 – 14 April 1944
- 938th Military Airlift Group (Associate), 1 October 1972
- 349th Military Airlift Wing (Associate), 1 July 1973
- 349th Operations Group, 1 August 1992 – 30 September 1996

=== Stations ===
- Baer Field, Indiana, 15 March 1943
- Grenada Army Air Field, Mississippi, 6 May 1943
- Lawson Field, Georgia, 5 June 1943
- Grenada Army Air Field, Mississippi, 28 January 1944
- Alliance Army Air Field, Nebraska, 12 March 1944 – 14 April 1944.
- Travis Air Force Base, California, 1 July 1973 – 1 August 1992

=== Aircraft ===
- Douglas C-47 Skytrain, 1943–1944
- Douglas C-53 Skytrooper, 1943–1944
- Lockheed C-141 Starlifter, 1972–1996
