= 349th Operations Group =

349th Operations Group

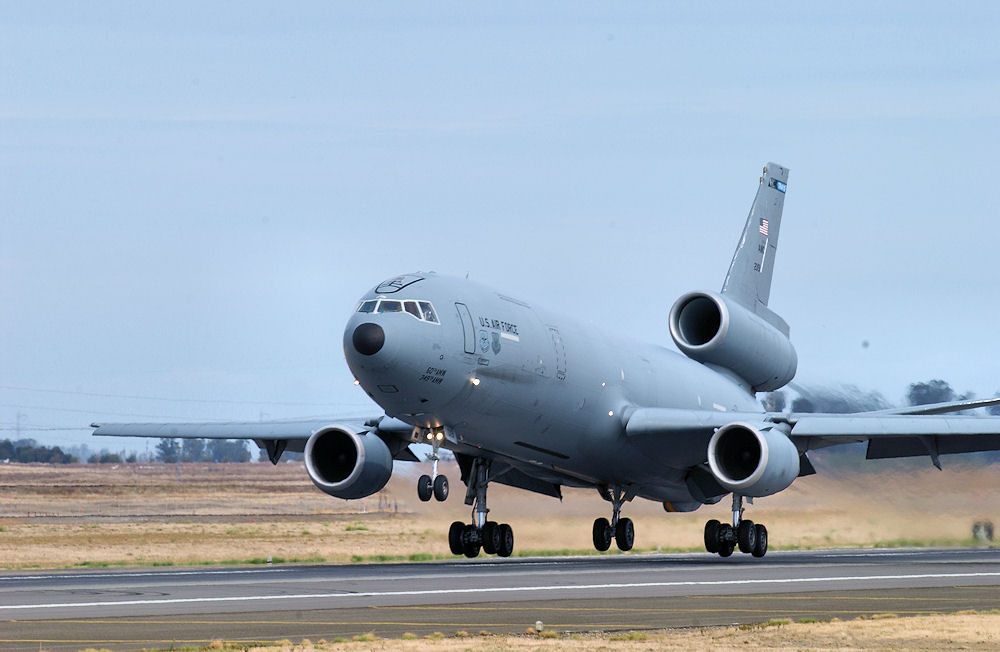
- McDonnell Douglas KC-10A Extender 82-0191 taking off at Travis AFB
- Active: 1943–1946; 1949–1951; 1952–1959; 1992—present
- Country: United States
- Branch: United States Air Force
- Role: Air Mobility
- Part of: Air Force Reserve Command
- Decorations: Air Force Outstanding Unit Award with Combat "V" Device; Air Force Outstanding Unit Award

Commanders
- Interim/Deputy Commander: Lt. Col. Jill N. Sliger

Insignia
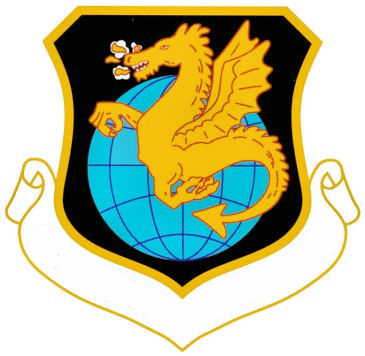
- 349th Operations Group emblem (Note: The group uses the 349th Air Mobility Wing emblem with the group designation on the scroll. Robertson, Factsheet, 349 Operations Group.)

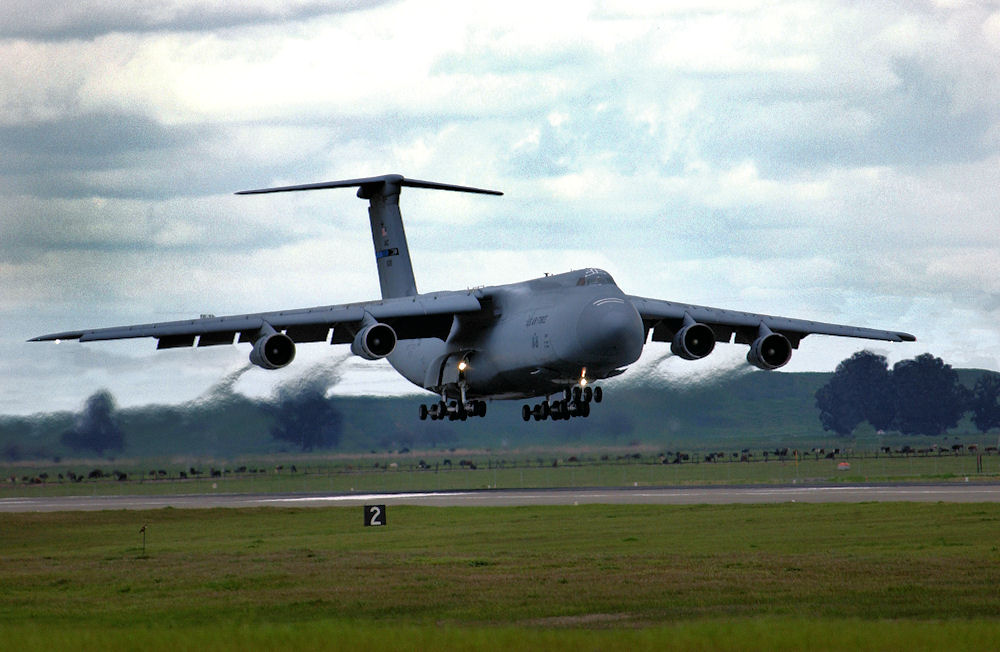
A Travis C-5 Galaxy returns from a training flight

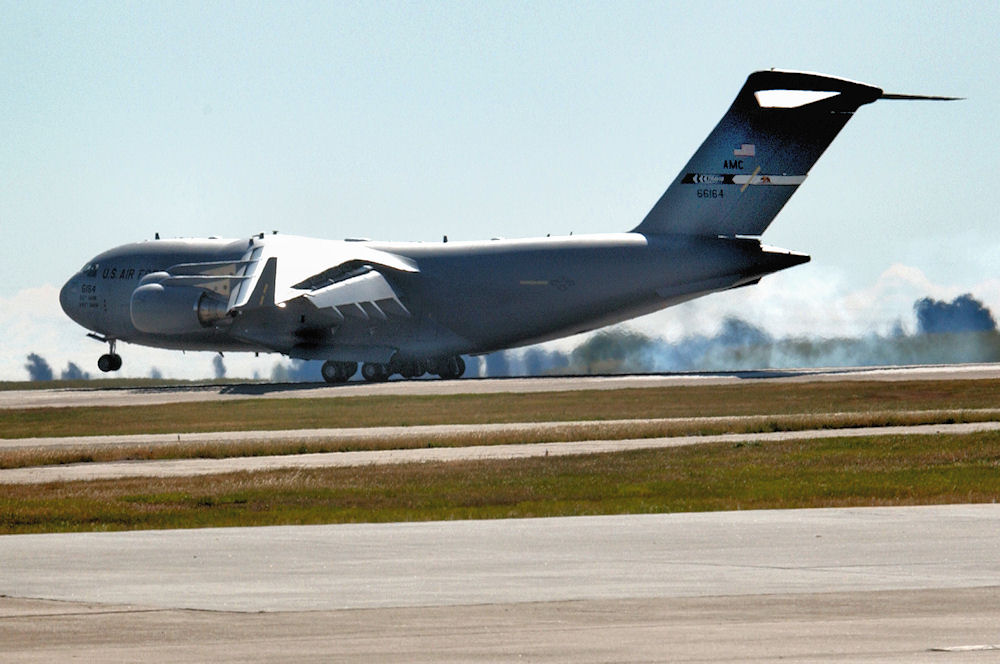
The newest Boeing C-17A Globemaster III, 06-6164, arrives at Travis AFB

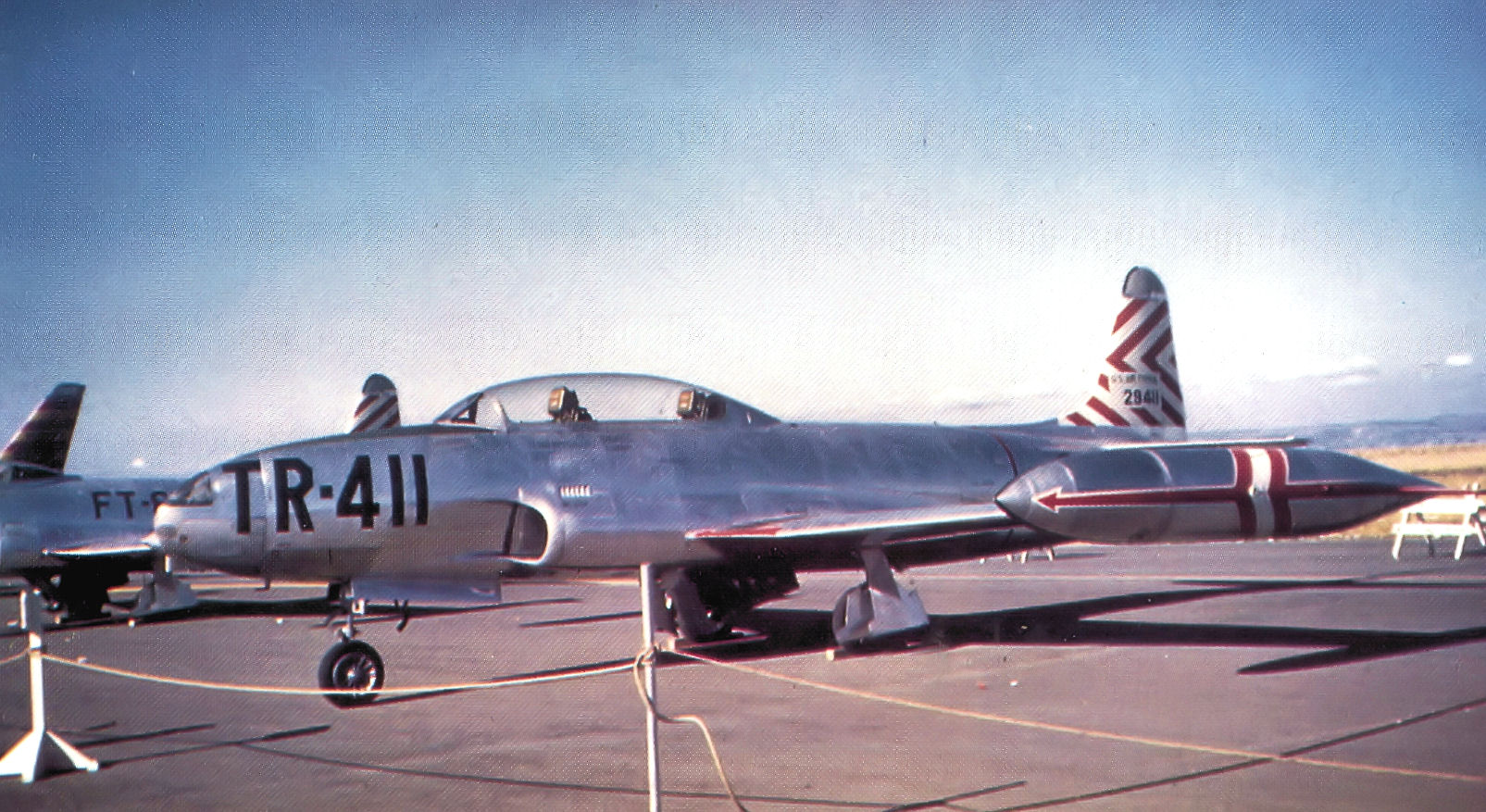
349th Fighter-Bomber Group Lockheed T-33A 52-9411, Hamilton AFB, California, 1955

The 349th Operations Group (349 OG) is a United States Air Force Reserve unit assigned to the 349th Air Mobility Wing. The unit is stationed at Travis Air Force Base, California.

The 349 OG controls all operational flying squadrons of the 349 AW.

The unit's World War II predecessor unit, the 349th Troop Carrier Group was a C-46 Commando transport unit assigned to Ninth Air Force in Western Europe.

== Units ==
- 70th Air Refueling Squadron (KC-10 Extender)
- 79th Air Refueling Squadron (KC-10 Extender)
- 349th Aeromedical Evacuation Squadron
- 301st Airlift Squadron (C-17 Globemaster III)
- 312th Airlift Squadron (C-5 Galaxy)
- 349th Operations Support Flight
- 349th Air Mobility Operations Flight

== History ==
See the 349th Air Mobility Wing for additional history and lineage

=== World War II ===
Trained at various bases for troop carrier operations, participating in maneuvers and practicing paratroop drops, glider towing, and flying training, until moving to Europe in March 1945. In western Europe, transported vehicles, gasoline, and supplies. At the end of the war, evacuated patients and allied former prisoners of war. Returned to America in July and August 1945.

=== Air Force Reserve ===
In 1946, trained Chinese crews to operate C-46 aircraft. Between June 1949 and April 1951, trained reservists in troop carrier operations. Between June 1952 and September 1957, trained for fighter-bomber operations, but returned to troop carrier training from September 1957 to April 1959.

Activated in 1992 to manage strategic airlift squadrons, and in 1994 also acquired air refueling squadrons. Since then the group has taken part in joint training exercises, channel and special assignment airlift missions, and humanitarian and contingency operations worldwide.

== Lineage ==
- Established as the 349th Troop Carrier Group on 23 October 1943

Activated on 1 November 1943
Inactivated on 7 September 1946

- Redesignated 349th Troop Carrier Group, Medium on 10 May 1949

Activated in the reserve on 27 June 1949
Ordered to active service on 1 April 1951
Inactivated on 2 April 1951

- Redesignated 349th Fighter-Bomber Group on 26 May 1952

Activated in the reserve on 13 June 1952
Redesignated 349th Troop Carrier Group, Medium on 1 September 1957
Inactivated on 14 April 1959
Redesignated: 349th Military Airlift Group on 31 July 1985 (Remained inactive)

- Redesignated: 349th Operations Group on 1 August 1992

Activated in the Reserve on 1 August 1992

=== Assignments ===
- 61st Troop Carrier Wing, 1 November 1943
- 60th Troop Carrier Wing, 11 March 1944
- I Troop Carrier Command, November 1944
- IX Troop Carrier Command, April 1945
- 52d Troop Carrier Wing, 30 April 1945
- 50th Troop Carrier Wing, 20 May 1945
- 52d Troop Carrier Wing, 31 January 1946
- Third Air Force, 27 August – 7 September 1946
- 349th Troop Carrier Wing, 27 June 1949 – 2 April 1951
- 349th Fighter-Bomber Wing (later 349 Troop Carrier Wing), 13 June 1952 – 14 April 1959
- 349th Airlift Wing (later 349 Air Mobility Wing), 1 August 1992 – present

=== Components ===
- 70th Air Refueling Squadron: 1 September 1994 – present
- 79th Air Refueling Squadron: 1 April 1995 – present
- 23d Troop Carrier Squadron: 1 December 1944 – 7 September 1946
- 97th Troop Carrier Squadron : 25 March 1958 – 14 April 1959
- 301st Airlift Squadron: 1 August 1992 – present
- 311th Troop Carrier Squadron: 1 November 1943 – 1 December 1944; 27 June 1949 – 2 April 1951
- 312th Troop Carrier Squadron (later 312th Fighter-Bomber Squadron, 312th Troop Carrier Squadron, 312th Airlift Squadron): 1 November 1943 – 7 September 1946; 27 June 1949 – 2 April 1951; 13 June 1952 – 14 April 1959; 1 August 1992 – present
- 313th Troop Carrier Squadron: 1 November 1943 – 7 September 1946; 27 June 1949 – 2 April 1951; 13 June 1952 – 14 April 1959
- 314th Troop Carrier Squadron: 1 November 1943 – 31 July 1946; 27 June 1949 – 2 April 1951; 13 June 1952 – 14 April 1959
- 328th Troop Carrier Squadron: 16 November 1957 – 25 March 1958
- 708th Airlift Squadron: 1 August 1992 – 30 September 1996
- 710th Airlift Squadron: 1 August 1992 – 1 January 1998

=== Stations ===
- Sedalia Army Air Field, Missouri, 1 November 1943
- Alliance Army Air Field, Nebraska, 20 January 1944
- Pope Field, North Carolina, 11 March 1944
- Baer Field, Indiana, 4 – 15 March 1945
- RAF Barkston Heath (AAF-483), England, 3 April 1945
- Roye-Amy Airfield (A-73), France, April-13 July 1945
- Bergstrom Field, Texas, September 1945 – 7 September 1946
- Hamilton Air Force Base, California, 27 June 1949 – 2 April 1951
- Hamilton Air Force Base, California, 13 June 1952 – 14 April 1959
- Travis Air Force Base, California, 1 August 1992 – present

=== Aircraft ===
- C-53 Skytrooper, 1943–1944
- C-47 Skytrain, 1943–1946; 1955–1956
- C-46 Commando, 1944–1946; 1949–1951; 1952–1958
- CG-4 Waco (Glider), 1944–1946
- Waco CG-13 (Glider), 1944–1945
- B-17 Flying Fortress, 1944
- B-24 Liberator, 1944
- C-109 Liberator Express, 1945
- F-51 Mustang, 1953–1954
- F-80 Shooting Star, 1953–1956
- C-45 Expeditor, 1954–1956
- F-84 Thunderjet, 1956–1957
- C-119 Flying Boxcar, 1958–1959
- C-141 Starlifter, 1992–1998
- C-5 Galaxy, 1992–present
- KC-10 Extender, 1994–present
