= 301st Airlift Squadron =

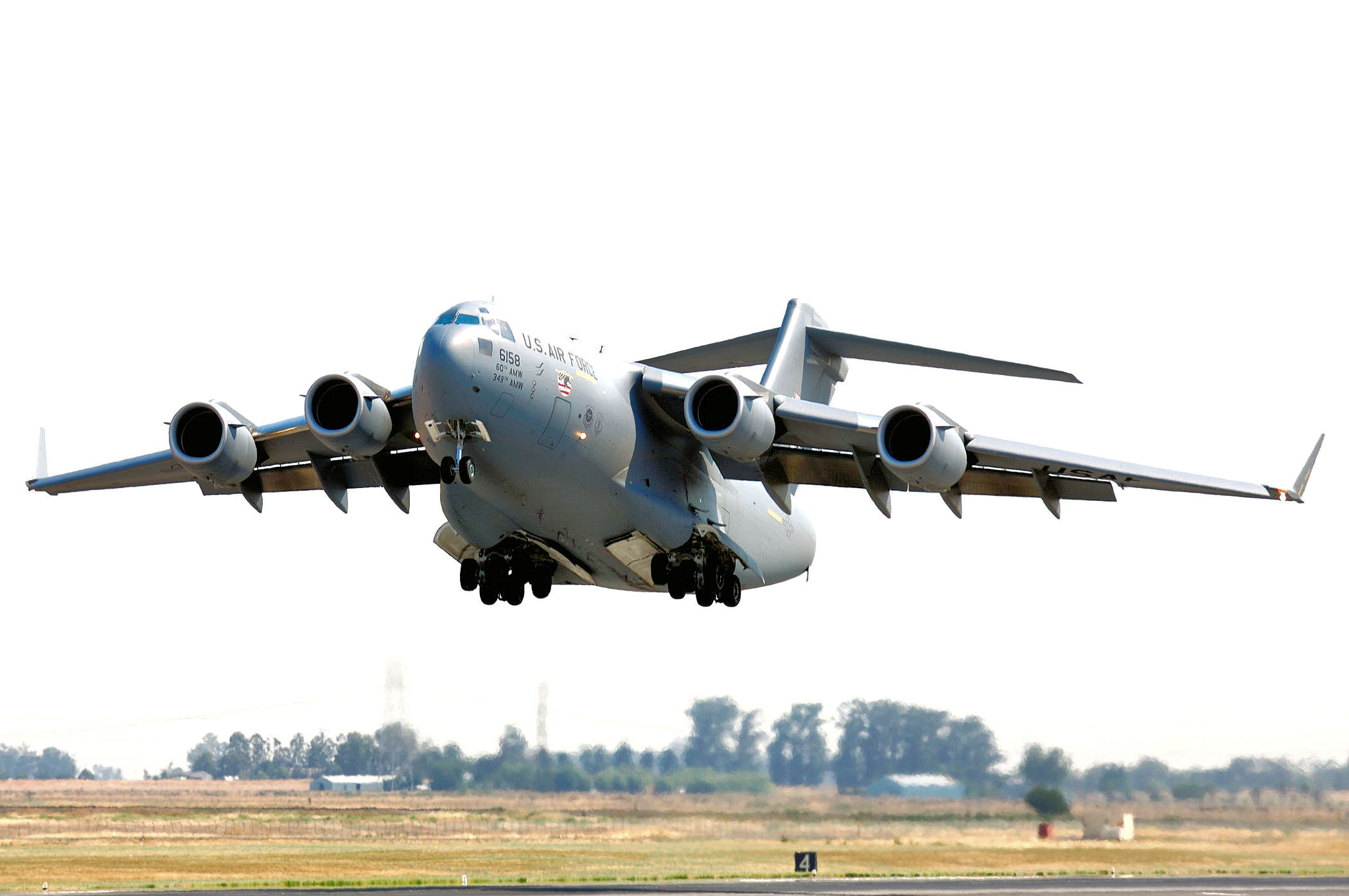
- 301st Airlift Squadron McDonnell Douglas C-17 Globemaster III
- Active: 1943–1946; 1949–1951; 1969–present
- Country: United States
- Branch: United States Air Force
- Role: Airlift
- Part of: Air Force Reserve Command; 4th Air Force; 349th Air Mobility Wing; 349th Operations Group
- Garrison/HQ: Travis Air Force Base, California
- Engagements: Operation Overlord; Operation Market Garden; Battle of Bastogne; Operation Plunder
- Decorations: Distinguished Unit Citation; Air Force Outstanding Unit Award with Combat "V" Device; Air Force Outstanding Unit Award; Republic of Vietnam Gallantry Cross with Palm

Insignia
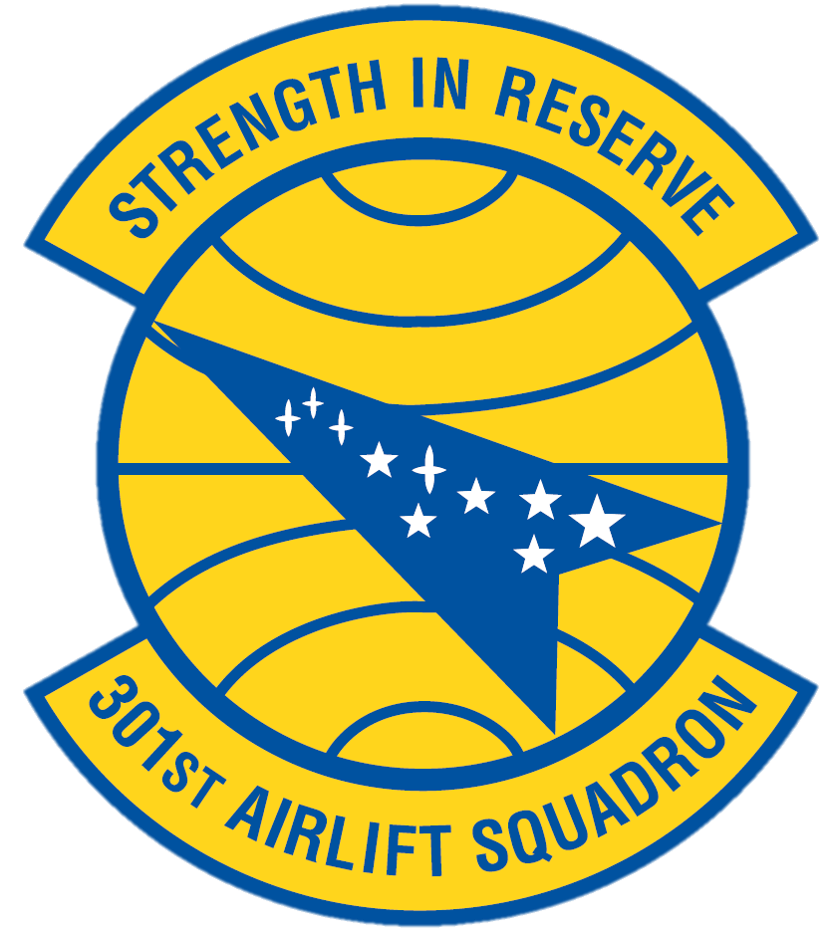
- 301st Airlift Squadron emblem (Approved 1973)

The 301st Airlift Squadron is a United States Air Force Reserve squadron, assigned to the 349th Operations Group, stationed at Travis Air Force Base, California. It is an associate unit of the active duty 21st Airlift Squadron of the 60th Air Mobility Wing.

The squadron was activated as the 301st Troop Carrier Squadron in 1943. After training in the United States, it deployed to the European Theater of Operations. On D-Day, it dropped paratroopers in Normandy, earning a Distinguished Unit Citation. After V-E Day, it served until spring 1946 as part of the occupation forces, then returned to the United States for inactivation.

The squadron was activated in the reserve in 1949 and was mobilized for the Korean War, but its personnel were used as fillers for other units and it was inactivated. It was activated again as the 301st Military Airlift Squadron, a reserve associate airlift squadron and has served in that role to the present.

== Mission ==
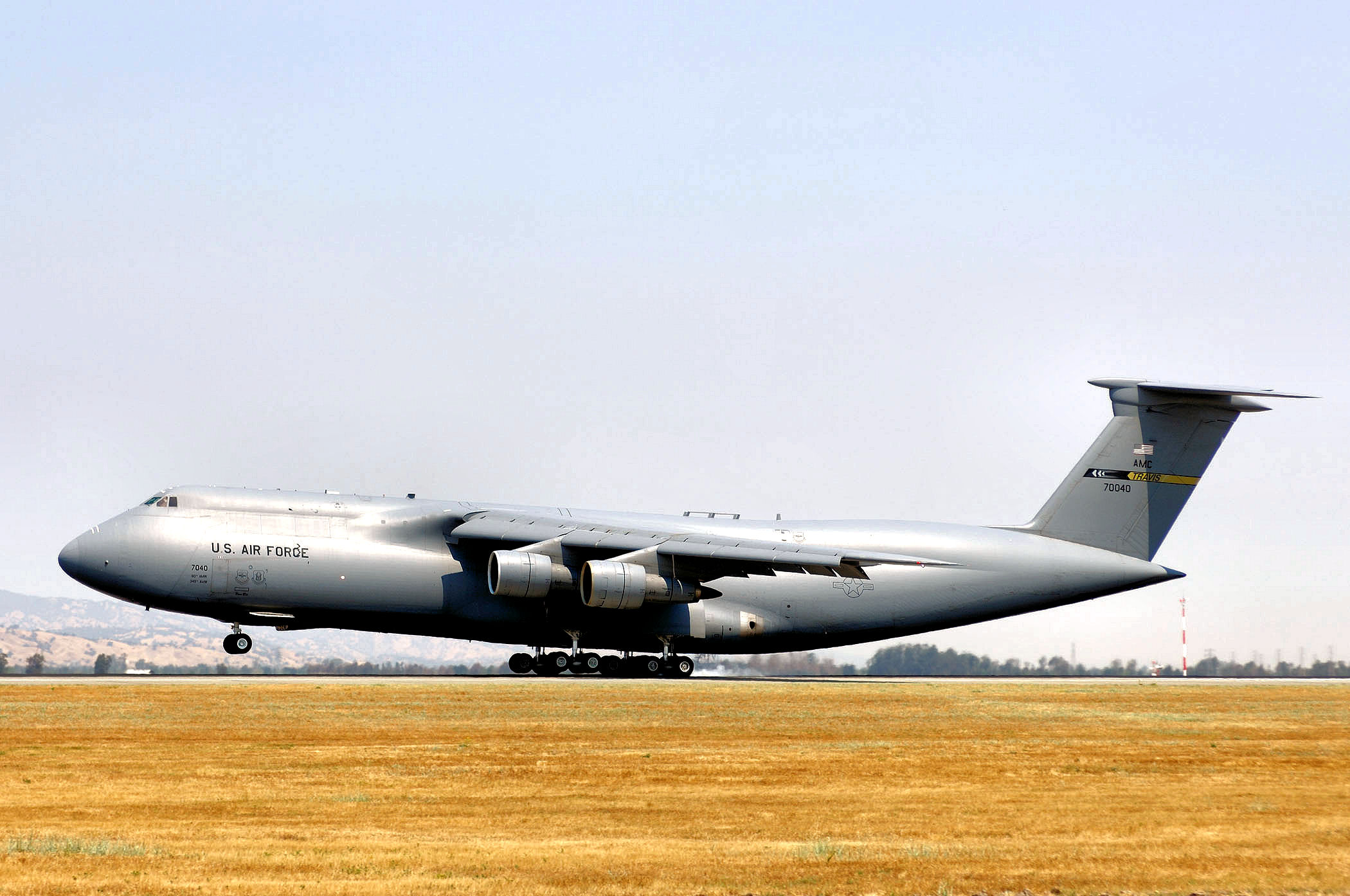
301st Airlift Squadron – C-5 Galaxy

The mission of the 301st Airlift Squadron is to train and provide qualified McDonnell Douglas C-17 Globemaster III aircrews to fly worldwide airlift missions and augment the active duty forces under readiness conditions up to and including full mobilization.

== History ==
=== World War II ===
The squadron was first activated as the 301st Troop Carrier Squadron in August 1943 at Sedalia Army Air Field, Missouri as a I Troop Carrier Command Douglas C-47 Skytrain squadron. After training in Missouri and later North Carolina, it was sent to Baer Field, Indiana for final equipping with aircraft and personnel. The 301st deployed to Ninth Air Force in England, and was assigned to IX Troop Carrier Command in March 1944 during the build-up prior to the invasion of France.

The squadron participated in the D-Day operation, dropping 101st Airborne Division paratroops near Cherbourg – Maupertus Airport, then carried out re-supply and glider delivery missions the following day.

The squadron's aircraft flew supplies into Normandy as soon as suitable landing strips were available and evacuated casualties to England. On 17 July the air echelon flew to Grosseto Airfield in Italy to prepare for operations connected with Operation Dragoon, the invasion of southern France, returning to England on 24 August.

The squadron moved to France in September 1944 and for the balance of the Northern France Campaign and the Western Allied invasion of Germany, it was engaged in combat resupply of ground forces, operating from advanced landing grounds in northern France. It delivered supplies to rough resupply and evacuation airfields near the front lines, returning combat casualties to field hospitals in rear areas.

After V-E Day, the squadron was based in the Leipzig area, then when Leipzig was turned over to the Soviet Union as part of its occupation zone, it was moved to the American Zone of Berlin where it was the first American air unit to occupy Tempelhof Airdrome on 4 July 1945.

The squadron returned to the United States in March 1946 and was inactivated at Bolling Field, District of Columbia.

=== Air Force reserve ===
The 301st was reactivated as a Curtiss C-46 Commando transport squadron in the Air Force Reserve in 1949. It was called to active duty as part of the Korean War mobilization in 1951. Unit personnel and aircraft were assigned as fillers to active-duty units and the squadron was quickly inactivated.

Since 1969 the 301st has trained in the Air Force Reserve to fly global strategic airlift missions, performing routine channel flights, contingency and humanitarian relief operations, and joint training exercises.

=== Operations and decorations ===
- Combat Operations. The squadron dropped paratroopers in preparation for Normandy invasion on 6 June 1944. It transported cargo and mail in France and England and evacuated wounded troops from the continent. It took part in airborne attacks in Netherlands in September 1944. It dropped supplies to the 101st Airborne Division when it was surrounded at Bastogne, Belgium, during the Battle of the Bulge. it participated in airborne crossings of Rhine River into Germany on 24 March 1945. The squadron supported operations Enduring Freedom and Noble Eagle after 11 September 2001 terrorist attack on the United States.
- Campaigns. World War II: Normandy; Northern France; Rhineland; Ardennes-Alsace; Central Europe; Panama, 1989–1990.
- Decorations. Distinguished Unit Citation: France, [6–7] Jun 1944. Air Force Outstanding Unit Award with Combat V Device: 1 Aug 2002 – 15 Aug 2003. Air Force Outstanding Unit Awards: 1 Jul 1974 – 30 Jun 1975; 1 Jul 1975 – 30 Jun 1977; 1 Jul 1992 – 30 Jun 1994; 1 Jul 1994 – 15 Aug 1995; 1 Jul 1996 – 30 Jun 1998; 1 Aug 2000 – 31 Jul 2002; 16 Aug 2003 – 17 Aug 2004; 18 Aug 2004 – 17 Aug 2005; 18 Aug 2005 – 17 Aug 2006; 18 Aug 2006 – 17 Aug 2007; 18 Aug 2007 – 17 Aug 2008; 18 Aug 2008 – 17 Aug 2009. Republic of Vietnam Gallantry Cross with Palm: 25 Jul 1969 – 28 Jan 1973.

== Lineage ==
- Constituted as the 301st Troop Carrier Squadron on 25 May 1943

Activated on 1 August 1943
Inactivated on 27 May 1946

- Redesignated 301st Troop Carrier Squadron, Medium on 10 May 1949

Activated in the Reserve on 27 June 1949
Ordered to active service on 10 March 1951
Inactivated on 14 March 1951

- Redesignated 301st Military Airlift Squadron (Associate) on 18 March 1969

Activated on 25 July 1969
Redesignated 301st Airlift Squadron (Associate) on 1 February 1992
Redesignated 301st Airlift Squadron on 1 October 1994

=== Assignments ===
- 441st Troop Carrier Group, 1 August 1943 (attached to 442d Troop Carrier Group after 18 May 1945)
- 442d Troop Carrier Group, 16 July 1945
- 302d Transport Wing, 8 August 1945
- 441st Troop Carrier Group, 8 August 1945 (attached to 473d Air Service Group after 18 September 1945)
- Continental Air Forces (later Strategic Air Command), 15 February 1946
- Bolling Field Command, 21 March 1946 – 27 May 1946
- 441st Troop Carrier Group, 27 June 1949 – 14 March 1951
- 938th Military Airlift Group, 25 July 1969
- 349th Military Airlift Wing (later 349th Airlift Wing), 1 July 1973
- 349th Operations Group, 1 August 1992 – present

=== Stations ===
- Sedalia Army Air Field, Missouri, 1 August 1943
- Camp Mackall North Carolina, 18 January 1944
- Baer Field, Indiana, 22 February 1944 – 29 February 1944
- RAF Langar (AAF-490), England, 17 March 1944
- RAF Merryfield (AAF-464), England, 25 April 1944

Operated from RAF Ramsbury (AAF-469), England, 7 August 1944 – 24 August 1944

- Villeneuve-Vertus Airfield (A-63), France, 8 September 1944
- Saint Marceau Airfield (A-43), France, 1 October 1944
- Dreux/Vernouillet Airfield (A-41), France, 3 November 1944
- Saint-André-de-l'Eure Airport (B-24), France, 20 May 1945
- AAF Station Halle, Germany, 28 June 1945
- Tempelhof Airdrome (later Tempelhof US Air Force Station), Germany, 4 July 1945
- Bolling Field, DC, 15 February 1946 – 27 May 1946
- Chicago-Orchard Airport (later O'Hare International Airport, Illinois, 27 June 1949 – 14 March 1951
- Travis Air Force Base, California, 25 July 1969 – present

=== Aircraft ===
- Aeronca L-3 Grasshopper (1943–1944)
- Douglas C-53 Skytrooper (1943–1944)
- Douglas C-47 Skytrain (1943–1946)
- Waco CG-4 (1944–1945)
- Curtiss C-46 Commando (1949–1951)
- North American T-6 Texan (1949–1951)
- Beechcraft T-7 Navigator (1949–1951)
- Beechcraft T-11 Kansan (1949–1951)
- Lockheed C-141 Starlifter (1969–1973)
- Lockheed C-5 Galaxy (1973–2006)
- McDonnell Douglas C-17 Globemaster III (2006–present)
