= 940th Air Refueling Wing =

940th Air Refueling Wing

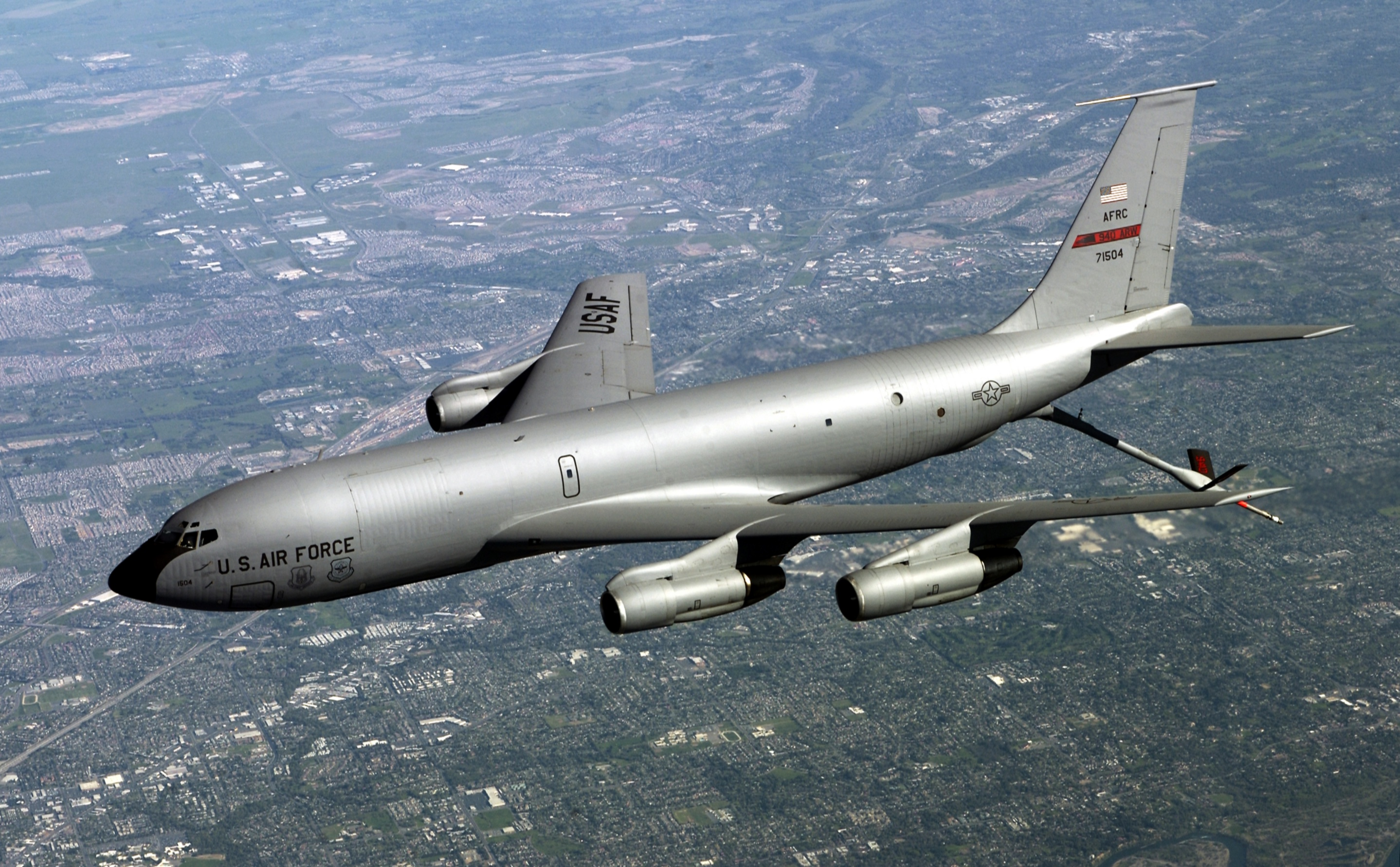
- KC-135E previously operated by the 940 ARW prior to transitioning to the KC-135R
- Active: 1963–present
- Country: United States
- Branch: United States Air Force
- Role: Air Refueling
- Part of: Air Force Reserve Command
- Garrison/HQ: Beale Air Force Base, California
- Motto: Citizen Warriors – Always First – Answering America’s Call
- Engagements: Operation Desert Storm, Operation Allied Force, Operation Noble Eagle, Operation Joint Forge
- Decorations: Air Force Outstanding Unit Award; Republic of Vietnam Gallantry Cross with Palm
- Website: www.940arw.afrc.af.mil

Commanders
- Current commander: Colonel Andrew P. Gray

Insignia
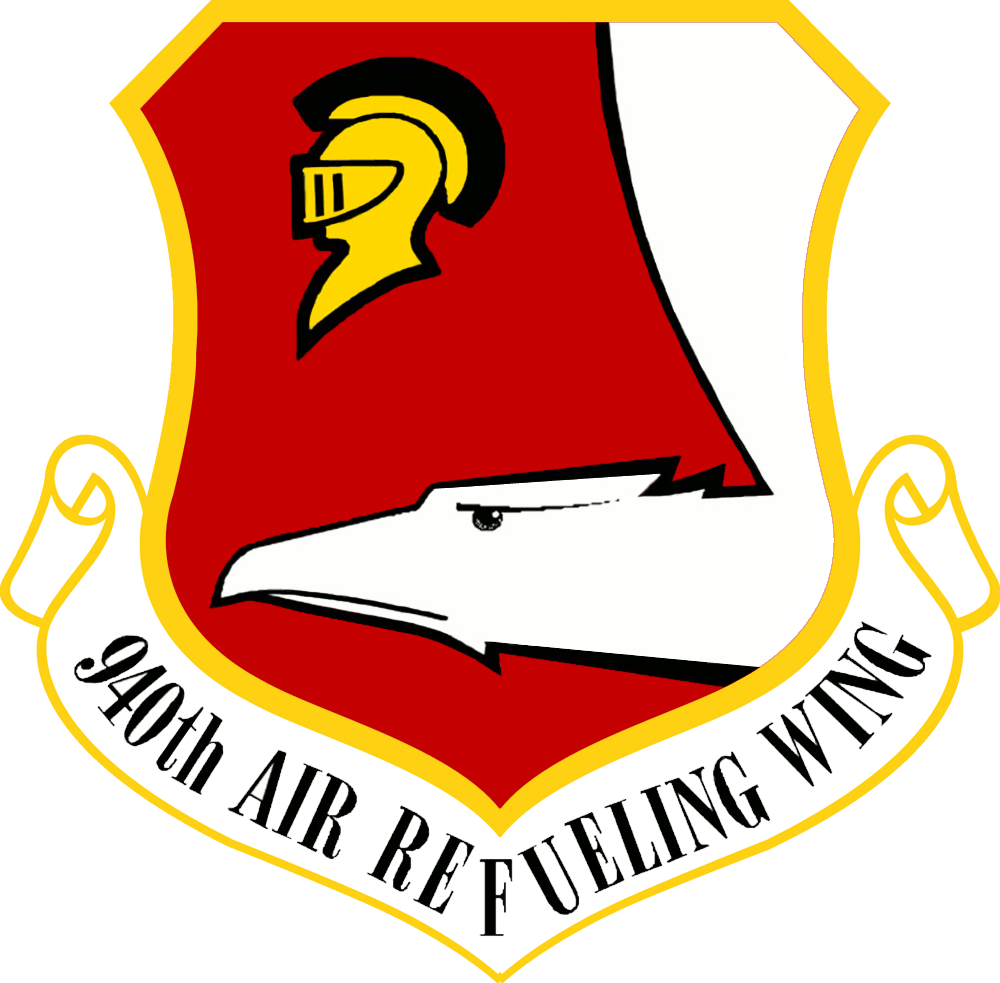
- 940th Air Refueling Wing emblem (Note: Approved 11 December 1968.)
- Tail code: BB

Aircraft flown
- Tanker: Boeing KC-135R Stratotanker

The 940th Air Refueling Wing is part of the Air Reserve Component of the United States Air Force. It is assigned to the Fourth Air Force of the Air Force Reserve Command, is operationally-gained by the Air Mobility Command, and is home stationed at Beale Air Force Base, California.

The 940th is an air refueling unit with eight Boeing KC-135R Stratotanker aircraft assigned. Its mission is to provide citizen airmen in support of United States national security objectives worldwide.

== Units ==
- 940th Operations Group

314th Air Refueling Squadron
940th Operations Support Squadron

- 940th Maintenance Group

940th Maintenance Squadron
940th Aircraft Maintenance Squadron

- 940th Mission Support Group

940th Force Support Squadron
940th Security Forces Squadron
940th Civil Engineer Squadron
940th Logistics Readiness Squadron
940th Communications Flight

- 940th Aerospace Medical Squadron

== History ==
=== Need for reserve troop carrier groups ===
After May 1959, the Air Force reserve flying force consisted of 45 troop carrier squadrons assigned to 15 troop carrier wings, (Note: Plus an additional four rescue squadrons not assigned to the wings. Cantwell, p. 156.) The squadrons were not all located with their parent wings, but were spread over thirty-five Air Force, Navy and civilian airfields under what was called the Detached Squadron Concept. The concept offered several advantages: (a) communities were more likely to accept the smaller squadrons than the large wings and (b) the location of separate squadrons in smaller population centers would facilitate local recruiting and manning. However, under this concept, all support organizations were located with the wing headquarters. Although this was not a problem when the entire wing was called to active service, mobilizing a single flying squadron and elements to support it proved difficult. This weakness was demonstrated in the partial mobilization of reserve units during the Berlin Crisis of 1961. To resolve this, at the start of 1962, Continental Air Command, (ConAC) determined to reorganize its AFRES wings by establishing groups with support elements for each of its troop carrier squadrons. This reorganization would facilitate mobilization of elements of wings in various combinations when needed.

=== Activation of the 940th Troop Carrier Group ===
As a result, the 940th Troop Carrier Group was established at McClellan Air Force Base, California on 11 February 1963 as the headquarters for the 314th Troop Carrier Squadron, which had been stationed there since October 1955. Along with group headquarters, a combat support squadron, materiel Squadron and a tactical infirmary were organized to support the 314th. The group was equipped with Fairchild C-119 Flying Boxcars for Tactical Air Command airlift operations.

The group was one of four C-119 groups assigned to the 349th Troop Carrier Wing in 1963, the others were the 938th Troop Carrier Group at Hamilton Air Force Base, California; 939th Troop Carrier Group, at Portland International Airport, Oregon, and the 941st Troop Carrier Group at Paine Air Force Base, Washington.

The 940th performed routine Air Force Reserve airlift operations and was upgraded to the Douglas C-124 Globemaster II intercontinental airlifter in 1965. With the C-124, the group flew overseas missions, particularly to the Far East and Southeast Asia.

=== Air Refueling ===
In 1972, the group converted to Lockheed C-130A Hercules. In 1975, the group changed aircraft again, converting to the Boeing KC-135A Stratotanker, and moving 9.5 miles southeast to nearby Mather Air Force Base, California as a tenant AFRES unit operationally-gained by the Strategic Air Command. At Mather, the 920th joined a SAC tenant unit, the 320th Bombardment Wing, and Mather's host wing, the Air Training Command's 323d Flying Training Wing. It was at this time the group became the 940th Air Refueling Group.

In September 1986, the 940th traded its older KC-135A Stratotankers for the upgraded KC-135E configuration.

The 940th was activated in January, 1991 to support the Gulf War with an Airbridge. Critical parts and equipment were first flown or sent to Barksdale AFB in Shreveport, Louisiana and then on to Moron Air Base in southern Spain. From there, additional unit aircraft flew the items to the Middle East to support the war.

Following the inactivation of the Strategic Air Command in 1992, operationally claimancy for the 940th shifted to the newly established Air Mobility Command.

When Mather AFB closed in 1993 pursuant to the 1989 Base Realignment and Closure Commission, the 940th returned to its former home of nearby McClellan. On 1 October 1994, as part of an Air Force directed restructuring of Air Force Reserve and Air National Guard flying units, the 940th was redesignated as the 940th Air Refueling Wing. The 940th remained at McClellan from July 1993 until May 1998, when that installation was also closed pursuant to 1993 Base Realignment and Closure Commission action. The wing then moved to its current home at Beale Air Force Base, California.

In the summer of 2005 the 940th again upgraded its KC-135s from the KC-135E to the KC-135R model. However, shortly following this transition and the approval of the 2005 Base Realignment and Closure Commission recommendations by President Bush, the 940th changed missions from flying the KC-135 to an "associate" unit to the 9th Reconnaissance Wing at Beale, supporting the Northrop Grumman RQ-4 Global Hawk unmanned high-altitude reconnaissance aircraft, as well as assuming other command and control missions.

On 12 March 2005, the 13th Reconnaissance Squadron was activated at Beale with the mission of working hand in hand with their active duty counterparts in the 9 RW. On 1 October 2007, the 50th Intelligence Squadron was activated with the same underlying mission, but working with the 548th Intelligence Group (later the 548th Intelligence, Surveillance and Reconnaissance Group). Both units were assigned to the 610th Regional Support Group at NAS JRB Fort Worth, Texas until the wing concluded its tanker mission.

=== Composite wing ===
On 1 July 2009 the wing was redesignated as the 940th Wing, operating unmanned aerial vehicles/remotely piloted aircraft.

The 940th Maintenance Group, 940th Aircraft Maintenance Squadron, 940th Maintenance Squadron, 940th Maintenance Operations Flight, and the 314th Air Refueling Squadron also inactivated, thus ending for a time the air refueling mission at Beale. On the same date the 13th Reconnaissance Squadron and the 50th Intelligence Squadron were reassigned to the 940th Operations Group.

The 713th Combat Operations Squadron was also activated on this date and aligned under the 940th. Two additional Air Force Reserve combat operations squadrons that man and operate the AN/USQ-163 Falconer Air and Space Operations Center weapon system were also realigned under the 940th Wing shortly thereafter: the 701st Combat Operations Squadron, at March Air Reserve Base, California and the 710th Combat Operations Squadron at Langley Air Force Base, Virginia. (Note: Each squadron also had a detachment at Hickam Air Force Base, Hawaii.)

On 1 May 2011, the 718th Intelligence Squadron was activated at Langley and aligned with the 940th Wing's command and control, intelligence, surveillance and reconnaissance mission.

In 2013, the 655th Intelligence, Surveillance and Reconnaissance Group stood up at Wright-Patterson Air Force Base, Ohio. The 655th gradually assumed control of all intelligence squadrons under Air Force Reserve Command.

=== Restoration of air refueling mission ===
In April 2016, the 940th Wing returned to its air refueling mission and was again designated the 940th Air Refueling Wing (940 ARW) on 29 April 2016 as an AFRC unit operationally-gained by the Air Mobility Command.

Concurrent with this change, the Air Force Reserve reconnaissance units in support of the RQ-4 Global Hawk at Beale that were gained by Air Combat Command were transferred to the 726th Operations Group at Creech Air Force Base, Nevada.

The first KC-135R returned to Beale on 10 July 2016, with the wing achieving initial operating capability with eight KC-135R aircraft as of October 2016. Concurrently, the wing's maintenance group, with its maintenance and aircraft maintenance squadrons, was reactivated, as was the 314th Air Refueling Squadron in the wing's operations group.

== Lineage ==
- Established as the 940th Troop Carrier Group, Medium and activated in the Reserve on 15 January 1963 (not organized)

Organized on 11 February 1963
Redesignated 940th Troop Carrier Group, Heavy on 1 April 1965
Redesignated 940th Air Transport Group, Heavy on 1 December 1965
Redesignated 940th Military Airlift Group on 1 January 1966
Redesignated 940th Tactical Airlift Group on 1 April 1972
Redesignated 940th Air Refueling Group, Heavy on 1 January 1977
Redesignated 940th Air Refueling Group on 1 February 1992
Redesignated 940th Air Refueling Wing on 1 October 1994
Redesignated 940th Wing on 1 July 2009
Redesignated 940th Air Refueling Wing on 29 April 2016

=== Assignments ===
- Continental Air Command, 15 January 1963
- 349th Troop Carrier Wing, 11 February 1963
- 452d Military Airlift Wing (later 452d Tactical Airlift Wing, 452d Air Refueling Wing), 26 January 1968
- Fourth Air Force, 1 October 1994
- Tenth Air Force, 1 October 2008
- Fourth Air Force, 29 April 2016 – present

=== Components ===
- 940th Operations Group: 1 August 1992 – present
- 314th Troop Carrier Squadron (later 314th Air Transport Squadron, 314th Military Airlift Squadron, 314th Tactical Airlift Squadron, 314th Air Refueling Squadron): 11 February 1963 – 1 August 1992, 29 April 2016 – present

=== Stations ===
- McClellan Air Force Base, California, 11 February 1963
- Mather Air Force Base, California, 1 January 1977
- McClellan Air Force Base, California, 1 July 1993
- Beale Air Force Base, California, 1 October 1997 – present

=== Aircraft ===
- Fairchild C-119 Flying Boxcar (1963–1965)
- Douglas C-124 Globemaster II (1965–1972)
- Lockheed C-130 Hercules (1972–1976)
- Boeing KC-135 Stratotanker (1976–2008, 2016–present)
- Northrop Grumman RQ-4 Global Hawk (2008–2016)

=== Decorations ===
- Air Force Outstanding Unit Award
  - 1 Oct 2003 – 30 September 2005
  - 1 Oct 2001 – 30 September 2003
  - 1 Oct 1999 – 30 September 2001
  - 1 Oct 1998 – 30 September 1999
  - 1 Oct 1995 – 30 September 1997
  - 31 July 1989 – 30 September 1990
  - 1 Jan 1979 – 31 December 1980
  - 1 March 1981 – 29 February 1984
  - 1 March 1963 – 29 February 1965
