= 939th Air Refueling Wing =

Inactive US Air Force unit

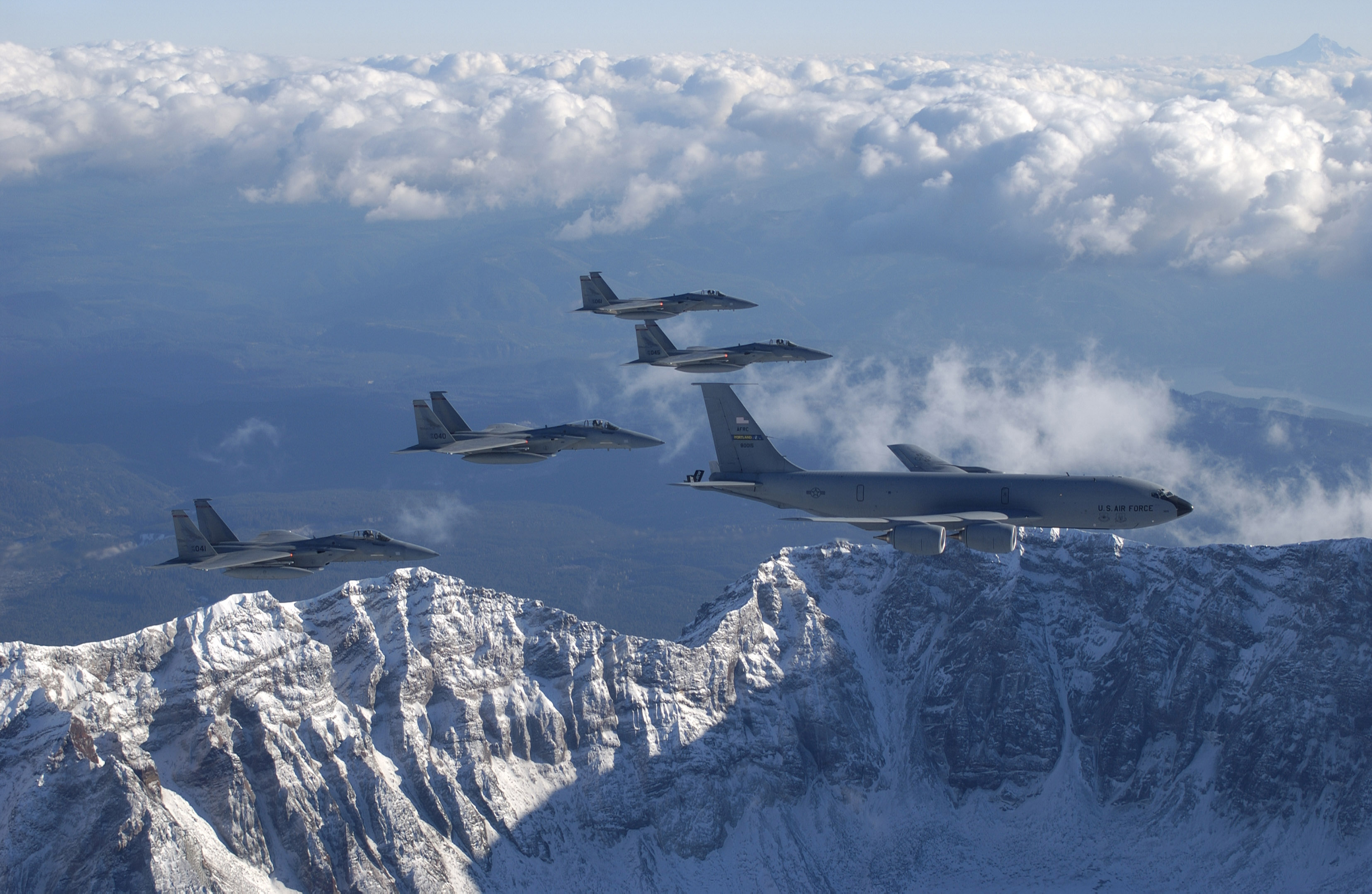
- 939th KC-135 Stratotanker refueling 142d Fighter Wing F-15 Eagles
- Active: 1963–1973; 1985–2008
- Country: United States
- Branch: United States Air Force
- Role: Aerial refueling
- Decorations: Air Force Outstanding Unit Award; Republic of Vietnam Gallantry Cross with Palm

Insignia
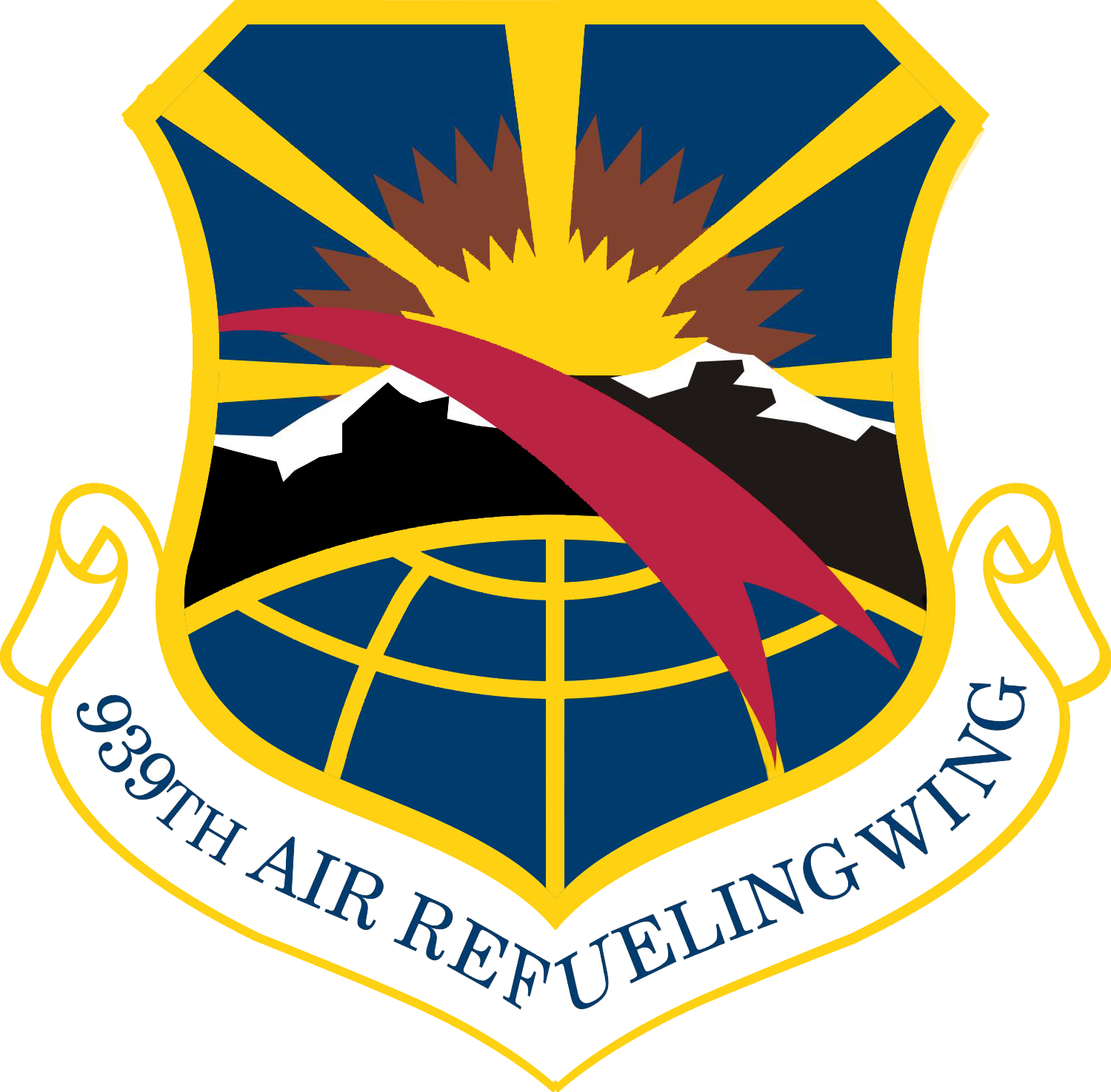
- 939th Air Refueling Wing emblem (Note: Approved 5 March 1969.)

The 939th Air Refueling Wing is an inactive United States Air Force Reserve unit. It was last active with the Fourth Air Force, based at the Portland Air Reserve Station, Oregon. It was inactivated on 30 June 2008.

== History ==
=== Need for reserve troop carrier groups ===
After May 1959, the reserve flying force consisted of 45 troop carrier squadrons assigned to 15 troop carrier wings. (Note: There were an additional four rescue squadrons not assigned to the wings. Cantwell, p. 156.) The squadrons were not all located with their parent wings, but were spread over thirty-five Air Force, Navy and civilian airfields under what was called the Detached Squadron Concept. The concept offered several advantages. Communities were more likely to accept the smaller squadrons than the large wings and the location of separate squadrons in smaller population centers would facilitate recruiting and manning. However, under this concept, all support organizations were located with the wing headquarters. Although this was not a problem when the entire wing was called to active service, mobilizing a single flying squadron and elements to support it proved difficult. This weakness was demonstrated in the partial mobilization of reserve units during the Berlin Crisis of 1961. To resolve this, at the start of 1962, Continental Air Command, (ConAC) determined to reorganize its reserve wings by establishing groups with support elements for each of its troop carrier squadrons. This reorganization would facilitate mobilization of elements of wings in various combinations when needed.

=== Activation of the 939th Troop Carrier Group ===
As a result, the 939th Troop Carrier Group was established at Portland International Airport, Oregon on 11 February 1963 as the headquarters for the 313th Troop Carrier Squadron, which had been stationed there since November 1957. Along with group headquarters, a Combat Support Squadron, Materiel Squadron and a Tactical Infirmary were organized to support the 313th. The group was equipped with Fairchild C-119 Flying Boxcars for Tactical Air Command airlift operations.

The group was one of four C-119 groups assigned to the 349th Troop Carrier Wing in 1963, the others were the 938th Troop Carrier Group at Hamilton Air Force Base, California, 940th Troop Carrier Group at McClellan Air Force Base, California, and the 941st Troop Carrier Group at Paine Air Force Base, Washington.

The 939th performed routine reserve airlift operations, being upgraded to the C-124 Globemaster II intercontinental airlifter in 1966. On 26 January 1968 the group was activated for combat duty in the Vietnam War. The group flew overseas missions, particularly to the Far East and Southeast Asia during that period, being relieved from active service in June 1969.

Inactivated on 1 July 1973 as part of a reorganization of Military Airlift Command assets, personnel and equipment being assigned directly to its host 349th MAW.

=== Air rescue operations ===
On 1 April 1985 the group was again activated as the 939th Aerospace Rescue and Recovery Group when the 304th Aerospace Rescue and Recovery Squadron at Portland International Airport equipped with Lockheed HC-130 Hercules aircraft transferred from March Air Force Base, California in addition to its Bell HH-1 Hueys. The mobilization gaining command for the group was Military Airlift Command, with the intermediate command being Twenty-Third Air Force until August 1989, then Air Rescue Service.

In December 1986, the group began converting its helicopter element to Sikorsky HH-3 Jolly Green Giants. In October 1987, the group became the headquarters for all reserve rescue units, when the 301st Aerospace Rescue and Recovery Squadron at Homestead Air Force Base, Florida and the 305th Aerospace Rescue and Recovery Squadron at Selfridge Air National Guard Base, Michigan were assigned to the group.

On 1 April 1990, recognizing that the group was parent for several operational squadrons, it was expanded as the 939th Air Rescue Wing. The three flying squadrons also became "air rescue" squadrons the same day. In February 1991, the 939th and its subordinate squadrons began conversion to Sikorsky HH-60G Pave Hawk helicopters.

In August 1992, the 939th Operations Group was activated and the wing's rescue squadrons were assigned to it. Following the devastation of Hurricane Andrew in the same month, the 301st Rescue Squadron provided extensive service, but was forced to abandon Homestead and move to Patrick Air Force Base, Florida.

The 939th also deployed aircrews from each of its rescue squadrons to provide search and rescue coverage worldwide, including to Naval Air Station Keflavik, Iceland, during and after the Southwest Asia War and to provide combat search and rescue coverage in the Persian Gulf area between 1993 and 2003.

In April 1997, the active duty Regular Air Force's 1st Rescue Group at Patrick AFB inactivated and a second reserve rescue squadron to strictly fly the HC-130, the 39th Rescue Squadron, was formed there. Both squadrons were placed under the 920th Rescue Group, which was assigned to the wing.

=== Air refueling operations ===
In 2003, the 939th converted to the air refueling mission with Boeing KC-135R Stratotanker aircraft and was redesignated as the 939th Air Refueling Wing. Some of its rescue squadrons were inactivated while others, including the 304th Rescue Squadron (304 RQS) at Portland ARS, were reassigned to the 920th, which was expanded as the 920th Rescue Wing and became the new headquarters for Air Force Reserve rescue units.

The 939th was inactivated in 2008 following the recommendations of the 2005 Base Realignment and Closure Commission and its KC-135Rs redistributed to other units.

== Lineage ==
- Established as the 939th Troop Carrier Group, Medium and activated on 15 January 1963 (not organized)

Organized in the Reserve on 11 February 1963
Redesignated 939th Tactical Airlift Group on 1 July 1967
Ordered to active service on 26 January 1968
Redesignated 939th Military Airlift Group (Associate) on 25 July 1968
Relieved from active duty on 15 June 1969
Inactivated on 1 July 1973

- Redesignated 939th Aerospace Rescue and Recovery Group and activated in the Reserve on 1 April 1985

Redesignated 939th Air Rescue Wing on 1 April 1990
Redesignated 939th Rescue Wing on 1 February 1992
Redesignated 939th Air Refueling Wing on 1 April 2003
Inactivated on 30 June 2008

=== Assignments ===
- Continental Air Command, 15 January 1963 (not organized)
- 349th Troop Carrier Wing (later 349th Military Airlift Wing), 11 February 1963 – 26 January 1968
- 452d Military Airlift Wing, 26 January 1968 – 15 June 1969 (detached 25 July 1968 – 15 June 1969
- 349th Military Airlift Wing, 15 June 1969 – 1 July 1973 (detached 25 July – 14 December 1969)
- 403d Aerospace Rescue and Recovery Wing (later 403d Rescue and Weather Reconnaissance Wing), 1 April 1985
- Fourth Air Force, 1 October 1987
- Tenth Air Force, 1 April 1990
- Fourth Air Force, 1 February 1992
- Tenth Air Force, 1 October 1993 – 30 June 2008

=== Components ===
Groups

- 920th Rescue Group, 1 August 1997 –1 April 2003
- 939th Operations Group, 1 August 1992 – 30 June 2008

Squadrons

- 97th Military Airlift Squadron, 25 July 1969 – 1 July 1973
- 301st Aerospace Rescue and Recovery Squadron (later 301st Air Rescue Squadron, 301st Rescue Squadron), 1 October 1987 – 1 August 1992
- 304th Aerospace Rescue and Recovery Squadron (later 304th Air Rescue Squadron, 304th Rescue Squadron), 1 April 1985 – 1 August 1992
- 305th Aerospace Rescue and Recovery Squadron (later 305th Air Rescue Squadron, 305th Rescue Squadron), 1 October 1987 – 1 August 1992
- 313th Troop Carrier Squadron (later 313th Military Airlift Squadron), 11 February 1963 – 1 July 1973

=== Stations ===
- Portland International Airport, 11 February 1963
- McChord Air Force Base, Washington, 25 July 1968 – 1 July 1973
- Portland Air Reserve Station, 1 April 1985 – 30 June 2008

=== Aircraft ===
- Fairchild C-119 Flying Boxcar (1963–1968)
- Lockheed C-141 Starlifter (1968–1973)
- Bell HH-1N Twin Huey (1985–1991)
- Lockheed HC-130 Hercules (1985–2003)
- Sikorsky HH-3E Jolly Green Giant (1986–1992)
- Sikorsky CH-3E (1987–1992)
- Sikorsky UH-60 Black Hawk (1991–1992)
- Sikorsky HH-60G Pave Hawk (1992–2003)
- Boeing KC-135R Stratotanker (2003–2008)
