= 941st Military Airlift Group =

941st Military Airlift Group

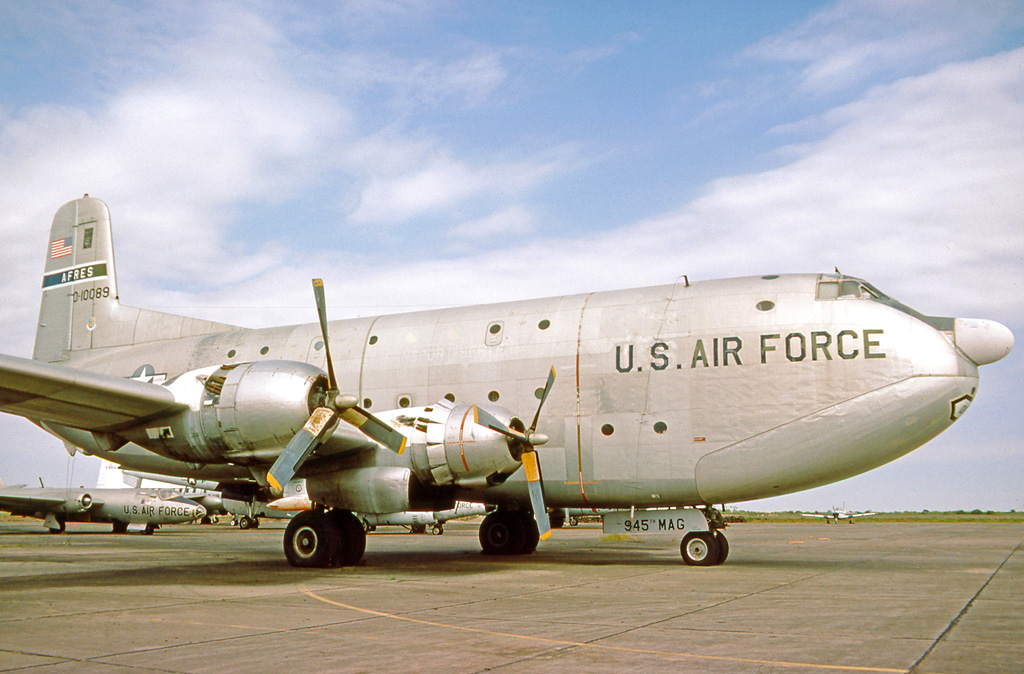
- Air Force Reserve Douglas C-124 (Note: Aircraft is Douglas C-124C Globemaster II 51–89)
- Active: 1963–1969
- Country: United States
- Branch: United States Air Force
- Role: Airlift
- Part of: Air Force Reserve

The 941st Military Airlift Group is an inactive United States Air Force Reserve unit. It was last active with the 349th Military Airlift Wing, based at McChord AFB, Washington. It was inactivated on 25 July 1969.

== History ==
=== Need for reserve troop carrier groups ===
After May 1959, the reserve flying force consisted of 45 troop carrier squadrons assigned to 15 troop carrier wings. (Note: There were an additional four rescue squadrons not assigned to the wings. Cantwell, p. 156) The squadrons were not all located with their parent wings, but were spread over thirty-five Air Force, Navy and civilian airfields under what was called the Detached Squadron Concept. The concept offered several advantages. Communities were more likely to accept the smaller squadrons than the large wings and the location of separate squadrons in smaller population centers would facilitate recruiting and manning. However, under this concept, all support organizations were located with the wing headquarters. Although this was not a problem when the entire wing was called to active service, mobilizing a single flying squadron and elements to support it proved difficult. This weakness was demonstrated in the partial mobilization of reserve units during the Berlin Crisis of 1961. To resolve this, at the start of 1962, Continental Air Command, (ConAC) determined to reorganize its reserve wings by establishing groups with support elements for each of its troop carrier squadrons. This reorganization would facilitate mobilization of elements of wings in various combinations when needed.

=== Activation of the 941st Troop Carrier Group ===
As a result, the 941st Troop Carrier Group was established at Paine Air Force Base, Washington on 11 February 1963 as the headquarters for the 97th Troop Carrier Squadron, which had been stationed there since March 1958. Along with group headquarters, a Combat Support Squadron, Materiel Squadron and a Tactical Infirmary were organized to support the 97th. The group was equipped with Fairchild C-119 Flying Boxcars for Tactical Air Command airlift operations.

The group was one of four C-119 groups assigned to the 349th Troop Carrier Wing in 1963, the others were the 938th Troop Carrier Group at Hamilton Air Force Base, California; 939th Troop Carrier Group, at Portland International Airport, Oregon, and the 940th Troop Carrier Group at McClellan Air Force Base, California.

The 941st performed routine reserve airlift operations, being moved to McChord Air Force Base, Washington in 1965 due to the closure of Paine. Was upgraded to the Douglas C-124 Globemaster II intercontinental airlifter in 1966. On 26 January 1968 the group was activated for combat duty in the Vietnam War. The group flew overseas missions, particularly to the Far East and Southeast Asia during that period, being relieved from active service in June 1969.

Inactivated shortly afterwards with the phaseout of the C-124 from the inventory. Personnel and equipment were reassigned to the 939th Military Airlift Group at McChord, being transitioned to the Lockheed C-141 Starlifter.

== Lineage ==
- Established as the 941st Troop Carrier Group, Medium and activated on 15 January 1963 (not organized)

Organized in the reserve on 11 February 1963
Redesignated 941st Air Transport Group, Heavy on 1 December 1965
Redesignated 941st Military Airlift Group on 1 January 1966
Ordered to active service on 26 January 1968
Relieved from active duty on 1 June 1969
Inactivated on 25 July 1969

=== Assignments ===
- Continental Air Command, 15 January 1963 (not organized)
- 349th Troop Carrier Wing (later 349th Military Airlift Wing), 11 February 1963 – 25 July 1969

=== Components ===
- 97th Troop Carrier Squadron (later 97th Military Airlift Squadron), 11 February 1963 – 25 July 1969

=== Stations ===
- Paine Air Force Base, Washington, 11 February 1963
- McChord Air Force Base, Washington, 9 November 1965 – 25 July 1969

=== Aircraft ===
- Fairchild C-119 Flying Boxcar, 1963–1965
- Douglas C-124 Globemaster II, 1965–1969
