= 312th Airlift Squadron =

312th Airlift Squadron

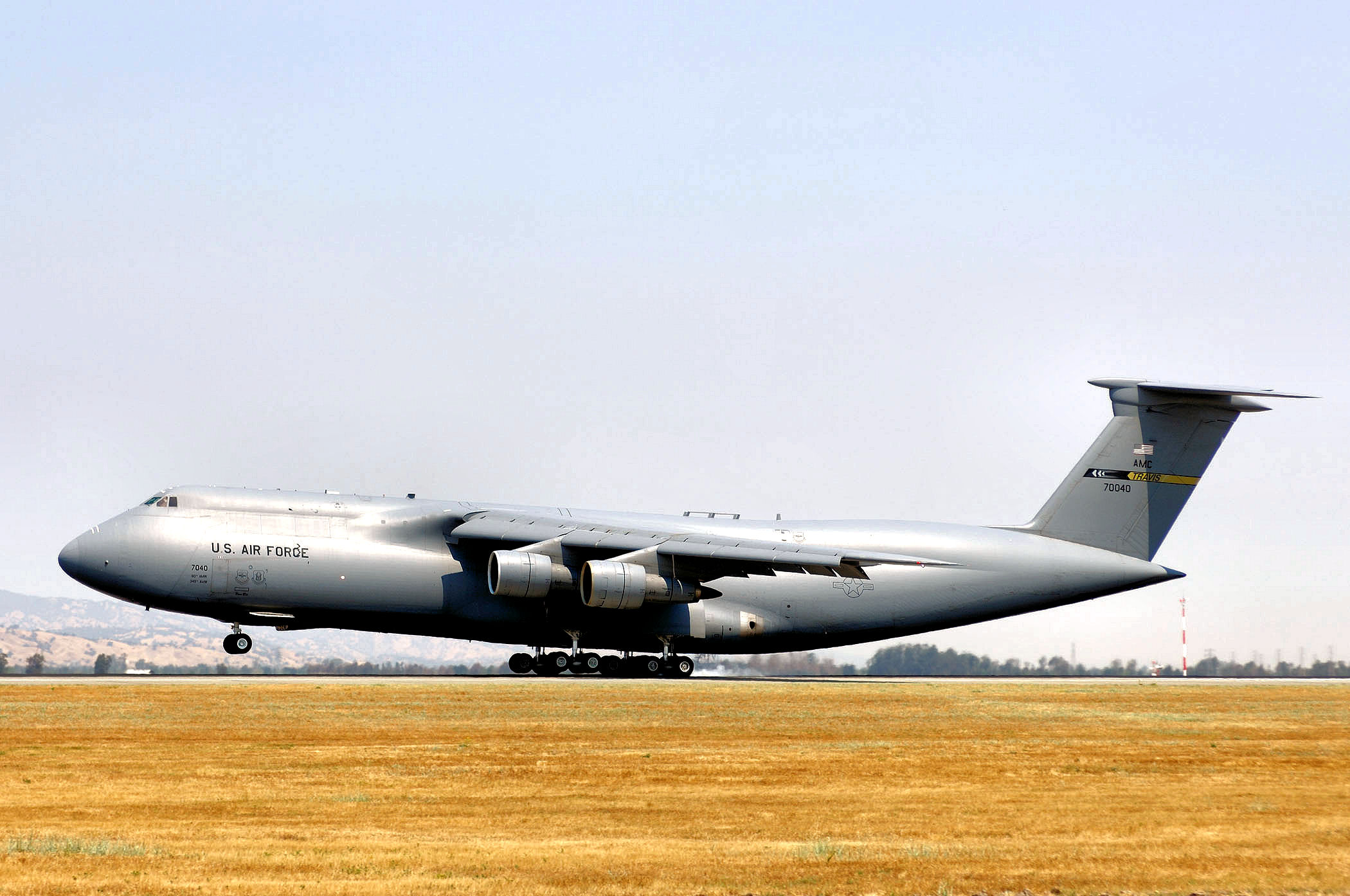
- 301st Airlift Squadron C-5 Galaxy
- Active: 1943–1946; 1949–1951; June 1952–present
- Country: United States
- Branch: United States Air Force
- Role: Airlift
- Part of: Air Force Reserve Command
- Garrison/HQ: Travis Air Force Base
- Engagements: European Theater of Operations; Operation Just Cause
- Decorations: Air Force Outstanding Unit Award with Combat "V" Device; Air Force Outstanding Unit Award; Republic of Vietnam Gallantry Cross with Palm

Insignia
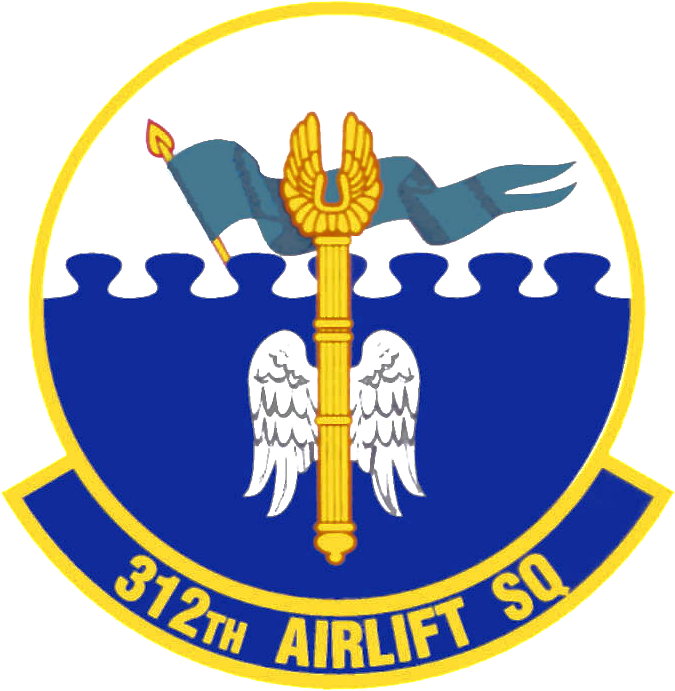
- 312th Airlift Squadron emblem (approved 2 December 1968)

The 312th Airlift Squadron is a United States Air Force Reserve squadron, assigned to the 349th Operations Group stationed at Travis Air Force Base, California. It is an associate unit of the 22d Airlift Squadron, 60th Air Mobility Wing. It operates C-5M Galaxy aircraft supporting United States Air Force operations worldwide. Its mission is to provide services and support which promote quality of life and project global power through airlift and airdrop.

== History ==
=== World War II ===
The unit was constituted as 312 Troop Carrier Squadron on 23 October 1943. Activated on 1 November 1943 and assigned to 349 Troop Carrier Group at Sedalia Army Air Field, MO. Moving to Alliance AAFld, NE, 20 January 1944; Pope Field, NC, 11 March 1944; Baer Field, IN, 7–15 March 1945; Barkston, England, 30 March 1945; Roye/Amy Airfield, France, 18 April-13 July 1945 providing aerial transportation in the European Theater of Operations during World War II. Moved to Bergstrom Field, TX, 17 September 1945 – 7 September 1946. Principally operating C-53 and C-47, 1943–1944, and C-46, 1944–1946. Inactivated on 7 September 1946. Redesignated as 312 Troop Carrier Squadron, Medium on 10 May 1949. Moving to Hamilton AFB, CA, 27 June 1949.

=== Air Force reserve and Korean mobilization ===
Inactivated on 2 Apr 1951. Redesignated as 312 Fighter-Bomber Squadron on 26 May 1952, F-51 Mustang fighters. Activated in the Reserve on 13 Jun 1952.

=== Return to the reserves ===
Resumed its reserve operations as a fighter-bomber squadron from 1952 to 1957. Redesignated as 312 Troop Carrier Squadron, Medium on 1 September 1957, with C-119 transport aircraft.

The 312th was called to active duty during the Cuban Missile Crisis in 1962 and from 1968 to 1969, with C-124. Moved to Travis AFB, CA, 25 July 1969 and redesignated as: 312 Military Airlift Squadron (Associate) on 25 July 1969. Flying C-141 Starlifters between 1969 and 1973 & C-5 Galaxys from 1973. Redesignated 312 Airlift Squadron (Associate) on 1 February 1992.

The squadron airlifted United States troops between the continental United States and Southeast Asia and flew other strategic airlift missions as needed across the Pacific Ocean, including channel flights, contingency and humanitarian relief operations, and joint training exercises. Flew missions in support of anti-terrorism operations after 11 September 2001 terrorist attack on the U. S.

On September 15, 2014, the wing was presented with the 2013 Outstanding Reserve Aircrew Award, the President's Award for displayed outstanding ability and professionalism by overcoming multiple system emergencies while flying Air Mobility Command missions between Rota Spain and Kandahar Air Base, Afghanistan. The 312th has provided airlift support for Operation Enduring Freedom, the U.S. government for the Global War on Terrorism.

== Lineage ==
- Constituted as the 312th Troop Carrier Squadron on 23 October 1943

Activated on 1 November 1943
Inactivated on 7 September 1946

- Redesignated 312th Troop Carrier Squadron, Medium on 10 May 1949

Activated in the reserve on 27 June 1949
Ordered to active service on 1 April 1951
Inactivated on 2 April 1951

- Redesignated 312th Fighter-Bomber Squadron on 26 May 1952

Activated in the reserve on 13 June 1952

- Redesignated 312th Troop Carrier Squadron, Medium on 1 September 1957

Ordered to active service on 28 October 1962
Relieved from active duty on 28 November 1962

- Redesignated 312th Military Airlift Squadron on 1 July 1966

Ordered to active service on 26 January 1968
Relieved from active duty on 2 June 1969

- Redesignated 312th Military Airlift Squadron (Associate) on 25 July 1969
- Redesignated 312th Airlift Squadron (Associate) on 1 February 1992
- Redesignated 312th Airlift Squadron on 1 October 1994

=== Assignments ===
- 349th Troop Carrier Group, 1 November 1943 – 7 September 1946
- 349th Troop Carrier Group, 27 June 1949 – 2 April 1951
- 349th Fighter-Bomber Group (later 349th Troop Carrier Group), 13 June 1952
- 349th Troop Carrier Wing, 14 April 1959
- 938th Troop Carrier Group (later 938 Military Airlift Group), 11 February 1963
- 349th Military Airlift Wing (later 349 Airlift Wing), 1 July 1973
- 349th Operations Group, 1 August 1992 – present

=== Stations ===
- Sedalia Army Air Field, Missouri, 1 November 1943
- Alliance Army Air Field, Nebraska, 20 January 1944
- Pope Field, North Carolina, 11 March 1944
- Baer Field, Indiana, 7–15 March 1945
- RAF Barkston Heath (AAF-483), England, 30 March 1945
- Roye-Amy Airfield (A-73), France, 18 April – 13 July 1945
- Bergstrom Field, Texas, 17 September 1945 – 7 September 1946
- Hamilton Air Force Base, California, 27 June 1949 – 2 April 1951
- Hamilton Air Force Base, California, 13 June 1952
- Travis Air Force Base, California, 25 July 1969 – present

=== Aircraft ===
- Douglas C-53 Skytrooper (1943–1944)
- Douglas C-47 Skytrain (1943–1944, 1955–1956)
- Curtiss C-46 Commando (1944–1946, 1949–1951, 1952–1955, 1957–1958)
- Beechcraft T-7 Navigator (1949–1951)
- Beechcraft T-11 Kansan (1949–1951)
- North American T-6 Texan (1952–1954)
- North American P-51 Mustang (1952–1954)
- North American T-28 Trojan (1953–1956)
- Lockheed T-33 T-Bird (1953–1957)
- Lockheed F-80 Shooting Star (1953–1957)
- Beechcraft C-45 Expeditor (1955–1956)
- Republic F-84 Thunderjet (1956–1957)
- Fairchild C-119 Flying Boxcar (1958–1966)
- Douglas C-124 Globemaster II (1966–1969)
- Lockheed C-141 Starlifter (1969–1973)
- Lockheed C-5 Galaxy (1973–present)

=== Decorations ===
Decorations. Air Force Outstanding Unit Award with Combat "V" Device: 1 August 2002 – 31 July 2002. Air Force Outstanding Unit Awards: 23 December 1964 – 22 January 1965; 26 January 1968 – 1 June 1969; 1 July 1974 – 30 June 1975; 1 July 1975 – 30 June 1977; 1 July 1992 – 30 June 1994; 1 Jul 1994 – 15 Aug 1995; 1 July 1996 – 30 June 1998; 1 August 2000 – 31 July 2002; 16 August 2003 – 17 August 2004; 18 August 2004 – 17 August 2005; 18 August 2005 – 17 August 2006; 18 August 2006 – 17 August 2007; 18 August 2007 – 17 August 2008; 18 August 2008 – 17 August 2009. Republic of Vietnam Gallantry Cross with Palm: 1 April 1966 – 28 January 1973.
