= 938th Military Airlift Group =

938th Military Airlift Group

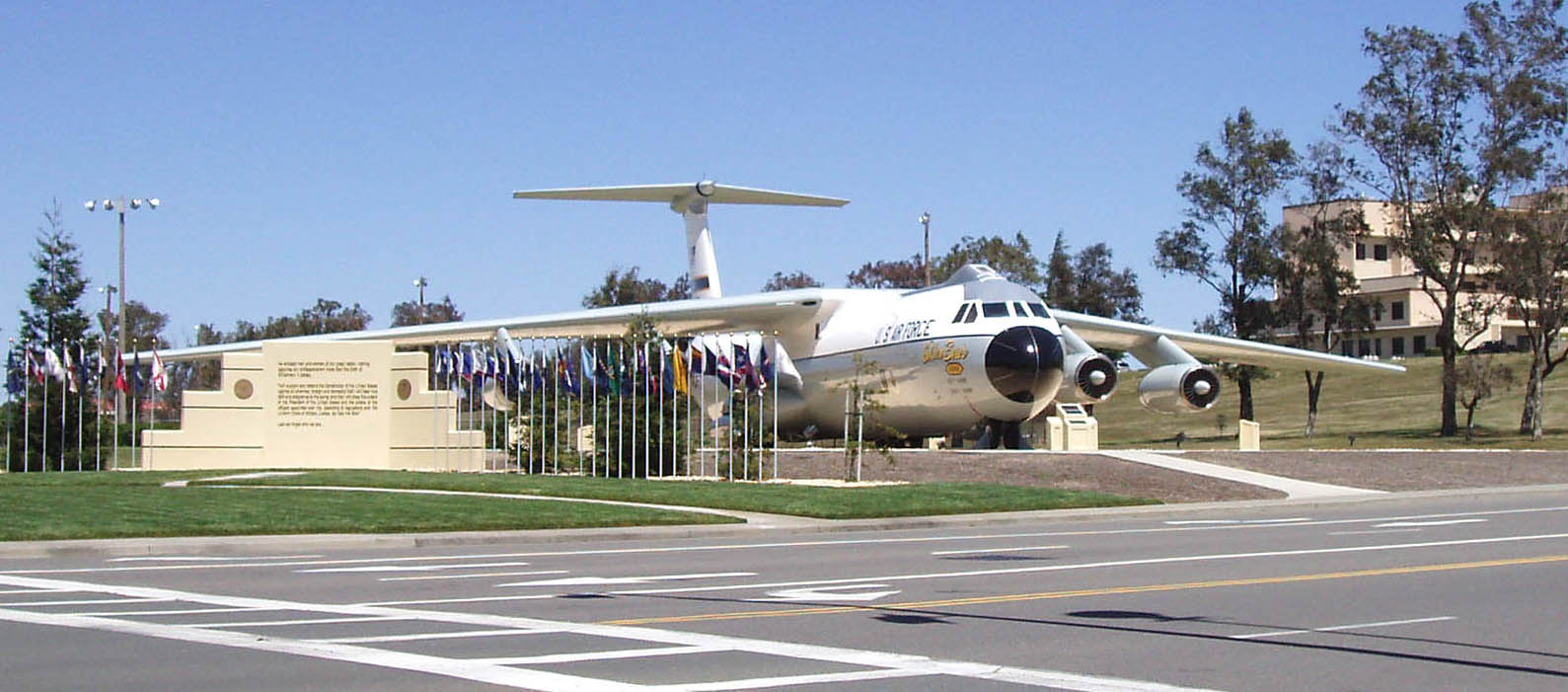
- C-141A at gate of Travis AFB
- Active: 1963–1973
- Country: United States
- Branch: United States Air Force
- Role: Airlift
- Part of: Air Force Reserve

Insignia
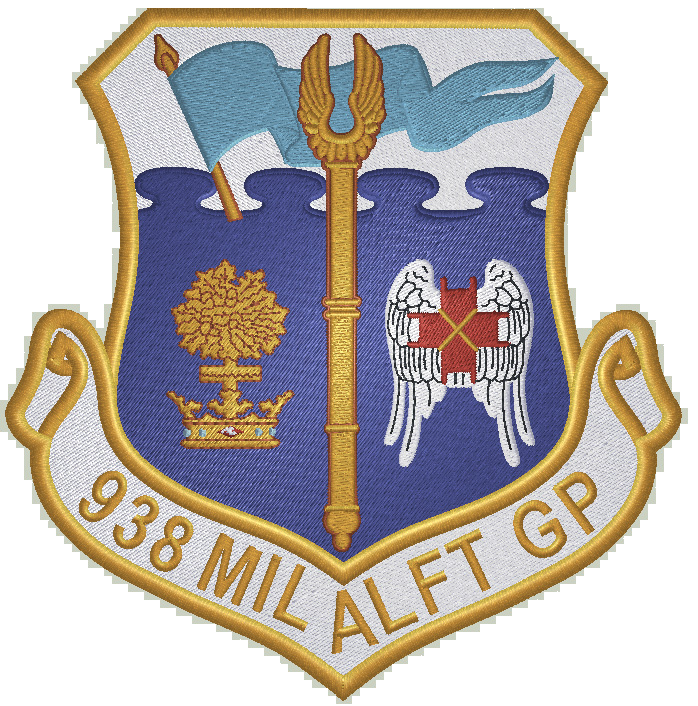
- 938th Military Airlift Group emblem

The 938th Military Airlift Group is an inactive United States Air Force Reserve unit. It was last active with the 349th Military Airlift Wing, based at Travis Air Force Base, California. It was inactivated on 1 July 1973.

== History ==
=== Need for reserve troop carrier groups ===
After May 1959, the reserve flying force consisted of 45 troop carrier squadrons assigned to 15 troop carrier wings. (Note: There were an additional four rescue squadrons not assigned to the wings. Cantwell, p. 156) The squadrons were not all located with their parent wings, but were spread over thirty-five Air Force, Navy and civilian airfields under what was called the Detached Squadron Concept. The concept offered several advantages. Communities were more likely to accept the smaller squadrons than the large wings and the location of separate squadrons in smaller population centers would facilitate recruiting and manning. However, under this concept, all support organizations were located with the wing headquarters. Although this was not a problem when the entire wing was called to active service, mobilizing a single flying squadron and elements to support it proved difficult. This weakness was demonstrated in the partial mobilization of reserve units during the Berlin Crisis of 1961. To resolve this, at the start of 1962, Continental Air Command, (ConAC) determined to reorganize its reserve wings by establishing groups with support elements for each of its troop carrier squadrons. This reorganization would facilitate mobilization of elements of wings in various combinations when needed.

=== Activation of the 938th Troop Carrier Group ===
As a result, the 938th Troop Carrier Group was established at Hamilton Air Force Base, California on 11 February 1963 as the headquarters for the 312th Troop Carrier Squadron, which had been stationed there since June 1952. Along with group headquarters, a Combat Support Squadron, Materiel Squadron and a Tactical Infirmary were organized to support the 312th. The group was equipped with Fairchild C-119 Flying Boxcars for Tactical Air Command airlift operations.

The group was one of four C-119 groups assigned to the 349th Troop Carrier Wing in 1963, the other being the 939th Troop Carrier Group, at Portland International Airport, Oregon; 940th Troop Carrier Group at McClellan Air Force Base, California, and the 941st Troop Carrier Group at Paine Air Force Base, Washington.

The 938th performed routine reserve airlift operations, being upgraded to the Douglas C-124 Globemaster II intercontinental airlifter in 1966. On 26 January 1968 the group was activated for combat duty in the Vietnam War. The group flew overseas missions, particularly to the Far East and Southeast Asia during that period, being relieved from active service in June 1969.

Was moved to Travis Air Force Base and upgraded to the Lockheed C-141 Starlifter jet transport. Flew strategic airlift missions as needed across the Pacific Ocean, including channel flights, contingency and humanitarian relief operations, and joint training exercises with active duty squadrons. Inactivated in July 1973 as part of a reorganization with its assets, personnel and equipment being assigned directly to its host 349th MAW.

=== Lineage ===
- Established as the 938th Troop Carrier Group, Medium and activated on 15 January 1963 (not organized)

Organized in the Reserve on 11 February 1963
Redesignated 938th Military Airlift Group on 1 July 1966
Ordered to active service on 26 January 1968
Relieved from active duty on 1 June 1969
Inactivated on 1 July 1973

=== Assignments ===
- Continental Air Command, 15 January 1963 (not organized)
- 349th Troop Carrier Wing (later 349th Military Airlift Wing), 11 February 1963 – 1 July 1973 (not operational 19 March 1968 – 1 June 1969, detached 14 July – 14 December 1969)

=== Components ===
- 301st Military Airlift Squadron, 25 July 1969 – 1 July 1973
- 312th Troop Carrier Squadron (later 312th Military Airlift Squadron), 11 February 1963 – 1 July 1973

=== Stations ===
- Hamilton Air Force Base, California, 11 February 1963
- Travis Air Force Base, California, 25 July 1969 – 1 July 1973

=== Aircraft ===
- Fairchild C-119 Flying Boxcar, 1963–1966
- Douglas C-124 Globemaster II, 1966–1969
- Lockheed C-141 Starlifter, 1969–1973
