= 349th Air Mobility Wing =

Air Reserve Component of the United States Air Force

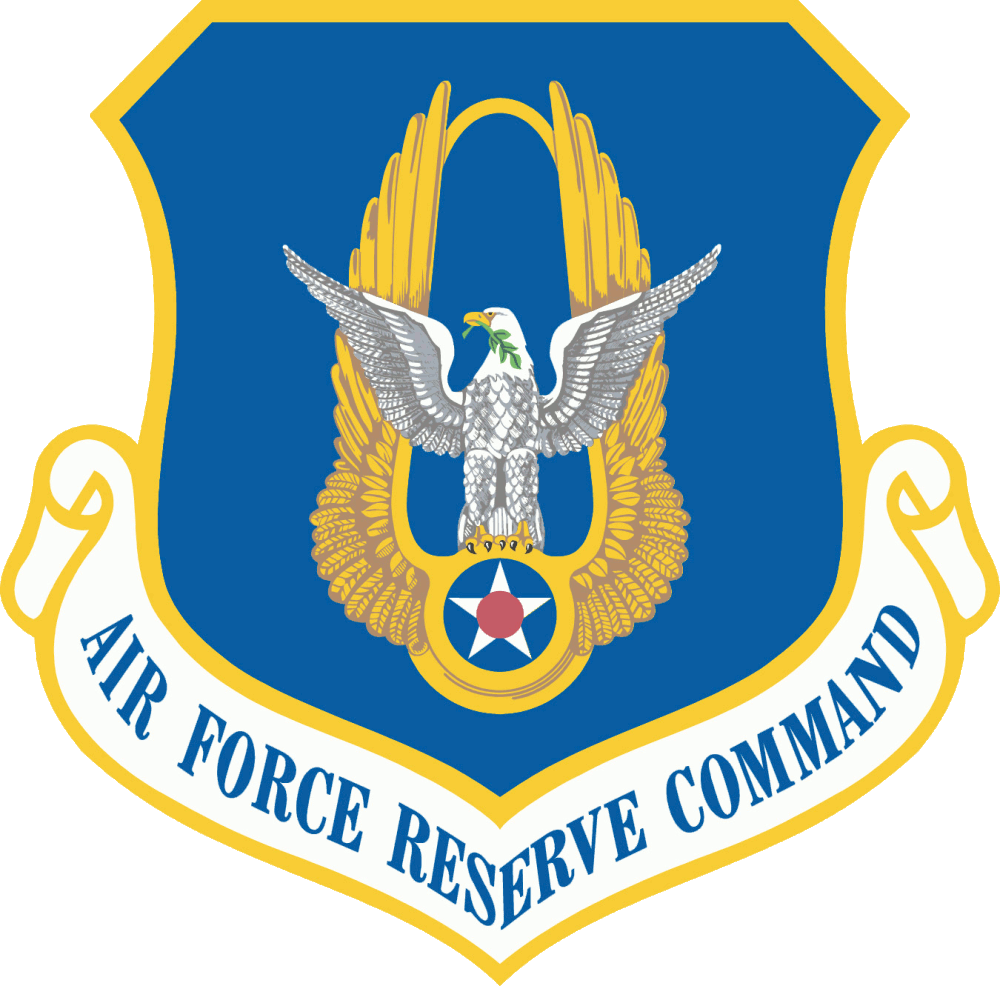
349th Air Mobility Wing

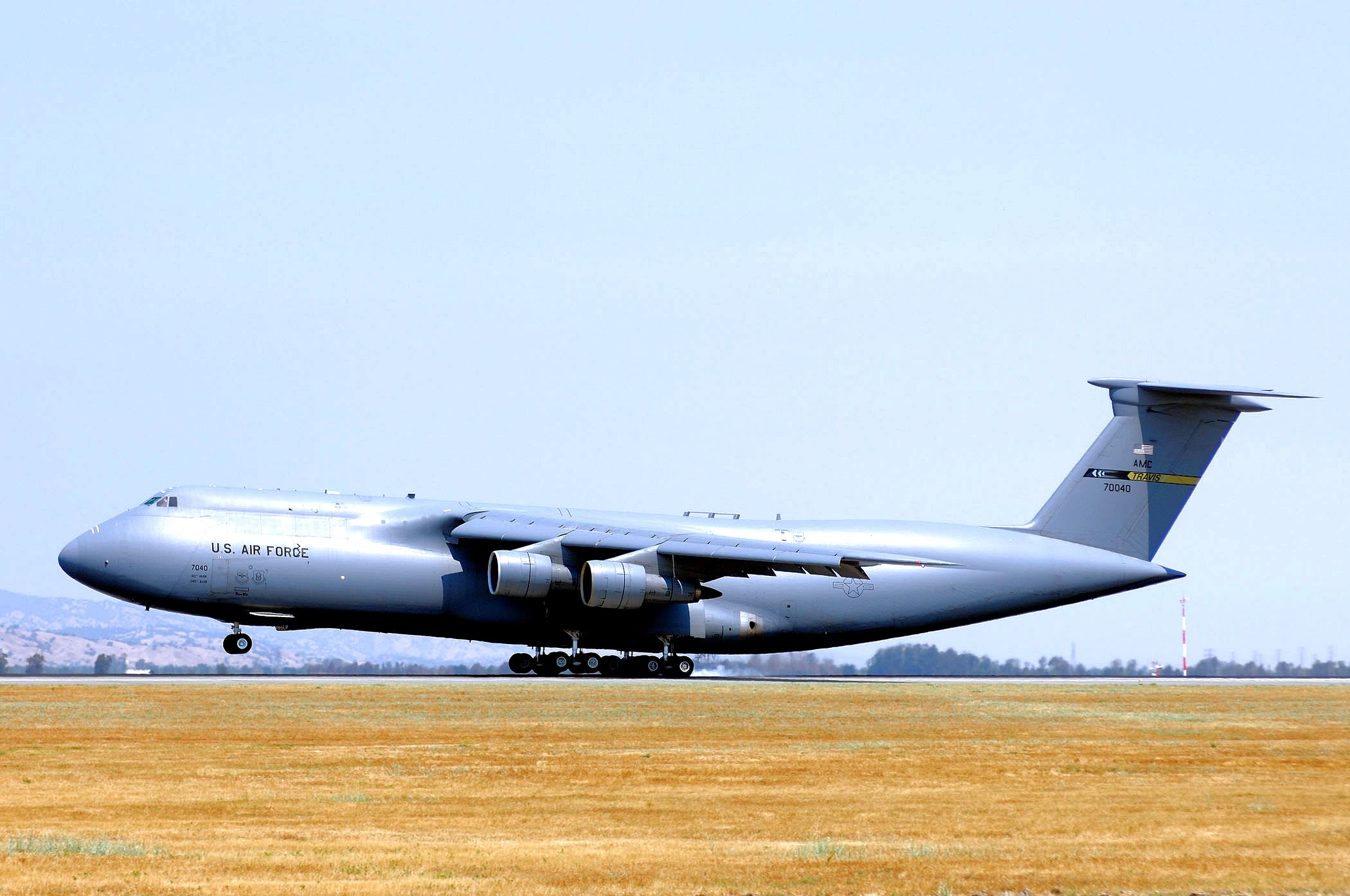
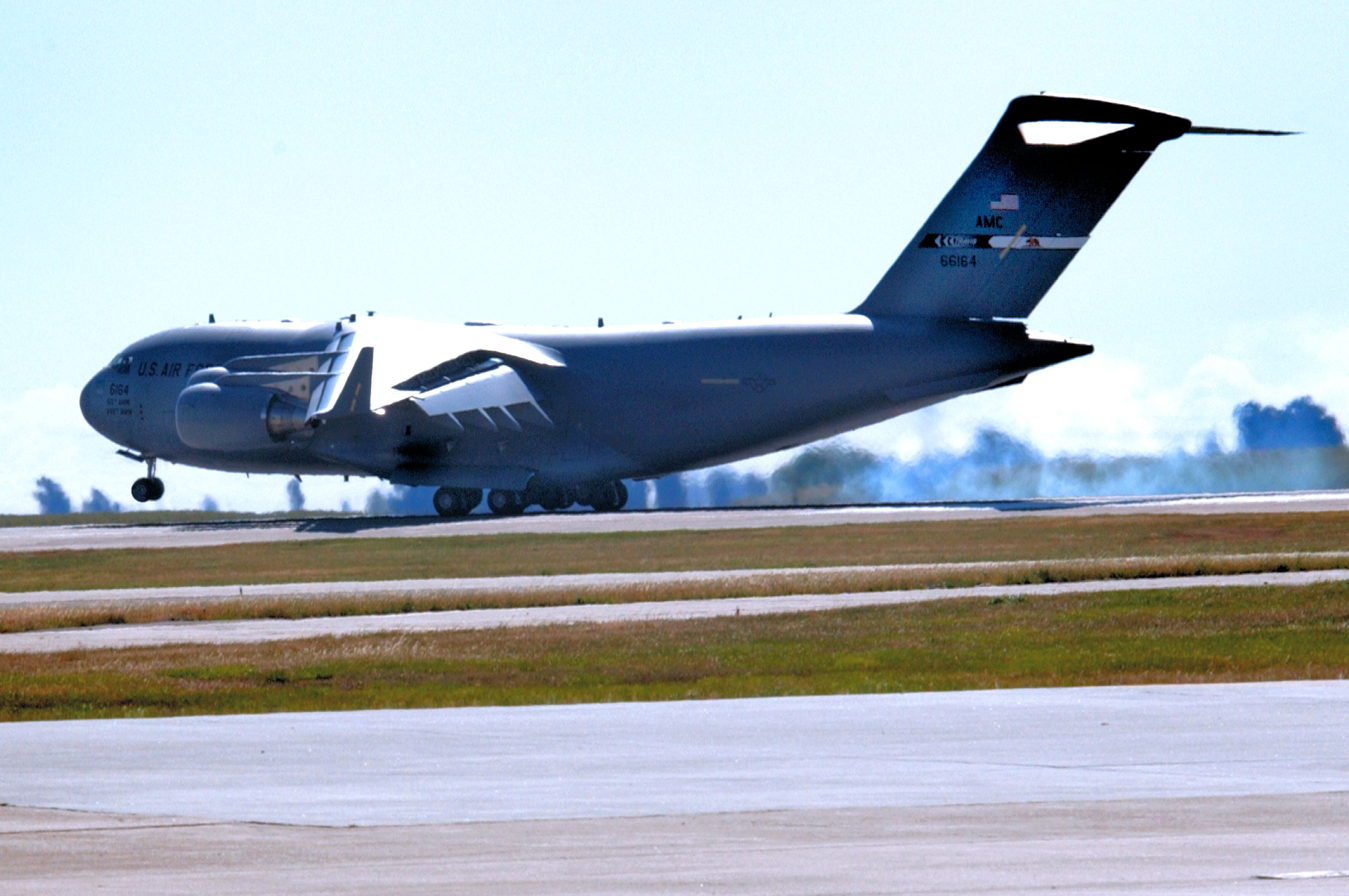
- 349th/60th AMW C-5B Galaxy, AF Ser. No. 87-0040 349th/60th AMW C-17A Globemaster III, AF Ser. No. 06-6164
- Active: 1949–1951; 1952–present
- Country: United States
- Branch: United States Air Force
- Type: Wing
- Role: Air Mobility
- Size: 2,700
- Part of: Air Force Reserve Command
- Garrison/HQ: Travis Air Force Base, California.
- Nickname: "The Golden Gate Wing"
- Mottos: Facta Non Verba (Latin for 'Deeds, not Words') (1956-1961)In Omnia Paratus (Latin for 'In All Things Prepared') (1961–present)
- Mascot: Wyvern
- Decorations: Air Force Outstanding Unit Award; Republic of Vietnam Gallantry Cross with Palm

Commanders
- Current commander: Col. Matthew J. Ihlenfeld
- Deputy Commander: Col. Kenneth M. Kirkpatrick
- Command Chief: CMSgt Joe G. Gonzalez

Insignia
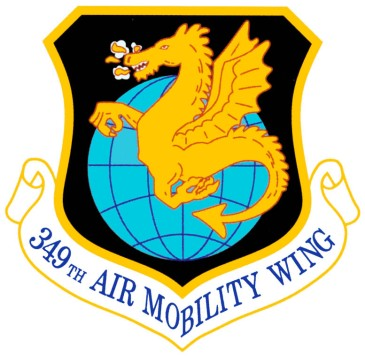
- 349th Air Mobility Wing emblem (Note: Approved 6 April 1995.)

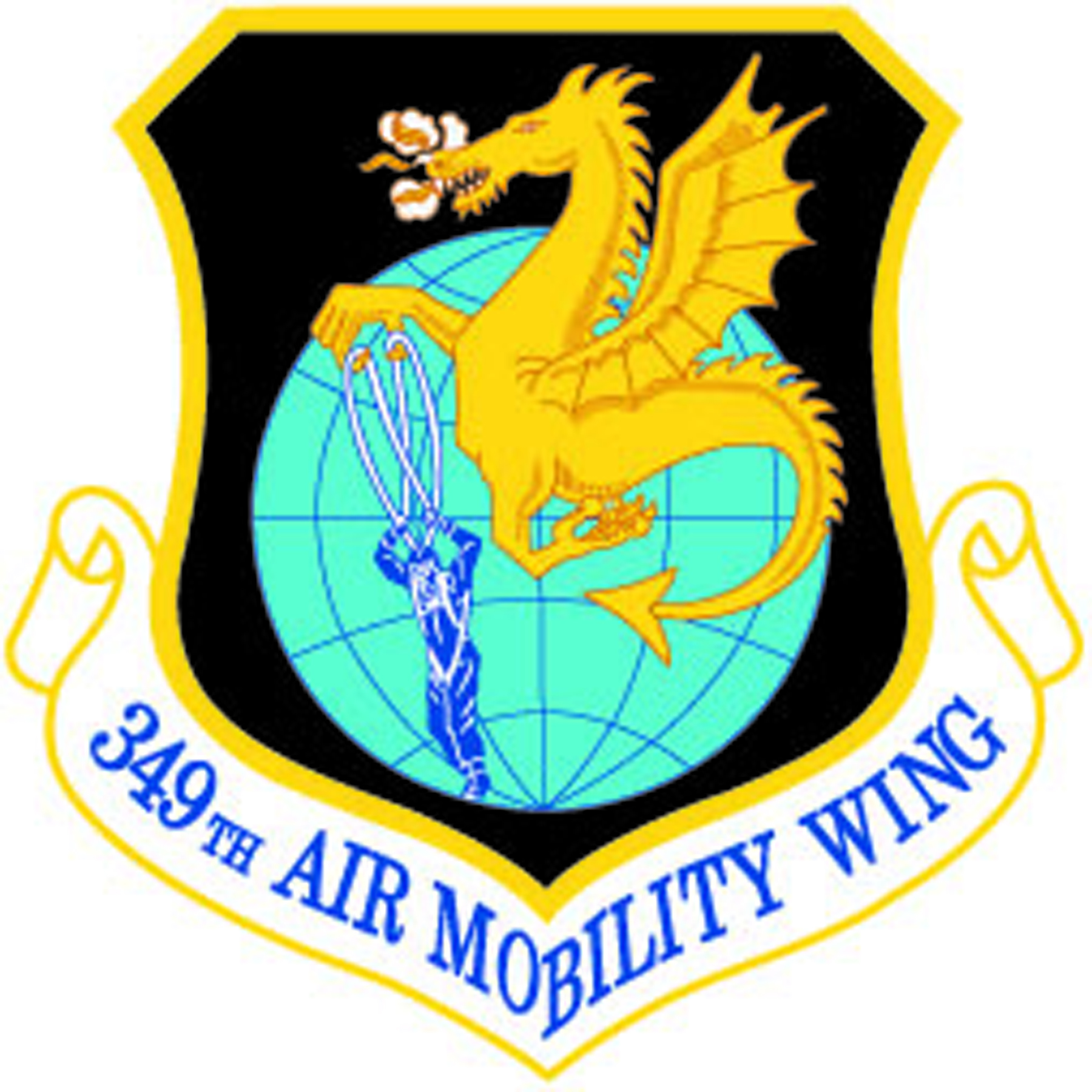
- 349th Troop Carrier Wing emblem (approved 2 September 1960
- Tail stripe: White/Black tail stripe "Travis" with California Bear decal

Aircraft flown
- Transport: C-5 Galaxy; C-17 Globemaster III

The 349th Air Mobility Wing is an Air Reserve Component of the United States Air Force. It is assigned to the Fourth Air Force, Air Force Reserve Command, stationed at Travis Air Force Base, California. The 349th AMW is an associate unit of the 60th Air Mobility Wing, Air Mobility Command (AMC) and if mobilized the wing is gained by AMC.

The 349th Air Mobility Wing is the largest associate wing in the United States Air Force Reserve Command. 349th AMW personnel fly the C-5M Super Galaxy, C-17 Globemaster III, and KC-46 Pegasus. The missions of the aircrews include airlifting personnel and material worldwide as well as aerial refueling a wide variety of aircraft.

The mission of the 349th AMW is to "generate and sustain combat-ready mobility Airmen." This makes the wing responsible for training almost 2,700 reservists who work side-by-side with their active duty partners in the 60th Air Mobility Wing, also stationed at Travis.

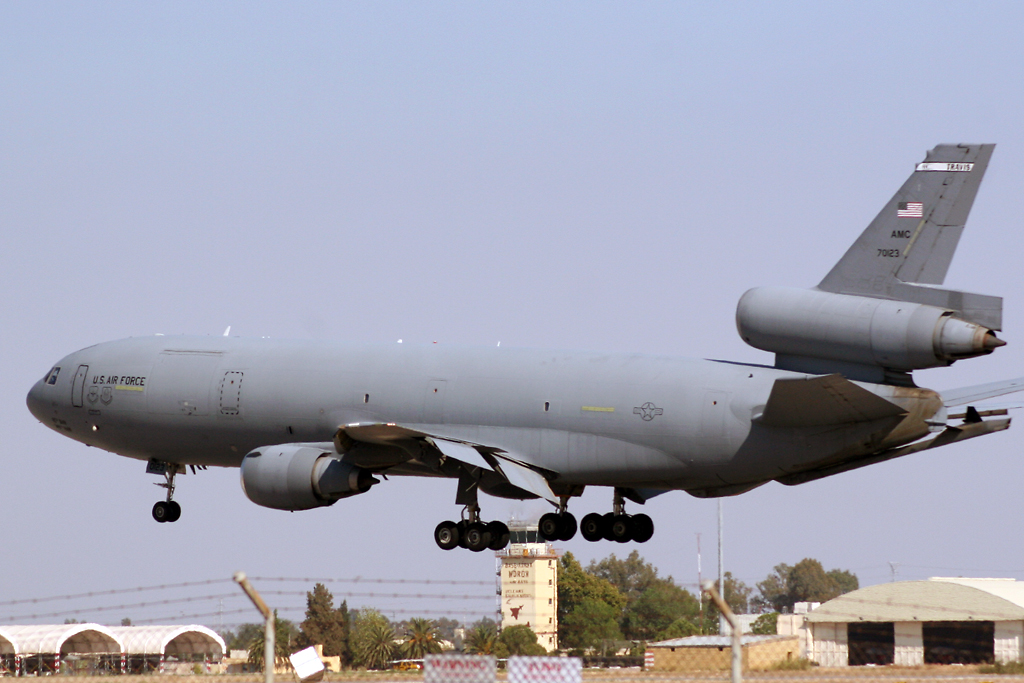
349th/60th AMW KC-10A Extender, AF Ser. No. 86-0037

== History ==
The unit's 349th Operations Group traces its lineage to the 349th Troop Carrier Group of the Second World War. The 349th Troop Carrier Group was a Curtiss C-46 Commando transport unit assigned to Ninth Air Force in Western Europe.

=== Initial activation and mobilization for the Korean War ===
The wing was first activated as a reserve organization at Hamilton Air Force Base California in June 1949 as the 349th Troop Carrier Wing, when Continental Air Command (ConAC) converted its reserve flying organizations under the wing base organization, which combined them with their support organizations under a single wing. It trained under the supervision of the 2346th Air Force Reserve Training Center. President Truman's reduced 1949 defense budget also required reductions in the number of units in the Air Force, and the wing drew its cadre from the 325th Air Division and the 68th and 72d Reconnaissance Groups, which were simultaneously inactivated. The wing trained for airlift with the Curtiss C-46 Commando, but also operated a number of trainer aircraft. The wing was manned at 25% of normal strength but its combat group was authorized four squadrons rather than the three of active duty units.

The wing, along with all reserve combat and corollary units, was mobilized for the Korean war. It was called to active duty in April 1951. Its personnel were used as fillers for other units, and its aircraft were distributed to other organizations as well. The wing was inactivated the following day.

=== Reserve fighter operations and Detached Squadron Concept ===
The wing was redesignated the 349th Fighter-Bomber Wing and once again activated in the reserves at Hamilton, where it replaced the 920th Reserve Training Wing. The reserve mobilization for the Korean War, however, had left the reserve without aircraft, and the unit did not receive aircraft until July 1952. Ironically, its initial aircraft were again C-46 Transports, and it was not until 1953 that it received World War II era North American F-51 Mustangs, along with trainers. Later in 1953 it received its first jet fighters, Lockheed F-80 Shooting Stars. Although called a fighter bomber unit, like all reserve fighter bomber wings, it had an air defense role.

During the first half of 1955, the Air Force began detaching Air Force Reserve squadrons from their parent wing locations to separate sites. The concept offered several advantages: communities were more likely to accept the smaller squadrons than the large wings and the location of separate squadrons in smaller population centers would facilitate recruiting and manning. As it finally evolved in the spring of 1955, ConAC's plan called for placing Air Force Reserve units at fifty-nine installations located throughout the United States. The wing's participation in the program began in October 1955, when the 313th Fighter-Bomber Squadron moved to Hill Air Force Base, Utah and the 314th Fighter-Bomber Squadron moved to McClellan Air Force Base, California, leaving only the 312th Fighter-Bomber Squadron with wing headquarters at Hamilton.

The Joint Chiefs of Staff were pressuring the Air Force to provide more wartime airlift. At the same time, about 150 Fairchild C-119 Flying Boxcars became available from the active force. Consequently, in November 1956 the Air Force directed ConAC to convert three reserve fighter bomber wings, including the 349th, to the troop carrier mission by September 1957. In addition, within the Air Staff was a recommendation that the reserve fighter mission given to the Air National Guard and replaced by the troop carrier mission. In September 1957, the wing once again became the 349th Troop Carrier Wing.

=== Return to airlift mission ===
With the 1957 redesignation, the wing began to re-equip with Flying Boxcars. Cuts in the budget in 1957 led to a reduction in the number of reserve wings from 24 to 15. This included not only inactivation of reserve fighter bomber wings, but of three troop carrier wings, as well. In November, the 313th Squadron's assets at Hill were absorbed by the 733d Troop Carrier Squadron and it moved on paper to Portland International Airport, Oregon, where it replaced the inactivating 403d Troop Carrier Wing. (Note: The 304th Air Rescue Squadron was also activated at Portland and absorbed some of the 403d's resources not associated with the troop carrier mission.) The wing added a fourth squadron in March 1958, when the 98th Troop Carrier Squadron activated at Paine Air Force Base, Washington to replace the 328th Troop Carrier Squadron in November 1957.

In April 1958, the 2346th Center was inactivated and some of its personnel were absorbed by the wing. In place of active duty support for reserve units, ConAC adopted the Air Reserve Technician Program, in which a cadre of the unit consisted of full-time personnel who were simultaneously civilian employees of the Air Force and held rank as members of the reserves.

The 349th converted to the Dual Deputate organization in April 1959. (Note: Under this plan flying squadrons reported to the wing Deputy Commander for Operations and maintenance squadrons reported to the wing Deputy Commander for Maintenance.) The 349th Fighter-Bomber Group was inactivated and its troop carrier squadrons were assigned directly to the Wing.

=== Activation of groups under the wing ===
Although the dispersal of flying units was not a problem when the entire wing was called to active service, mobilizing a single flying squadron and elements to support it proved difficult. This weakness was demonstrated in the partial mobilization of reserve units during the Berlin Crisis of 1961. To resolve this, at the start of 1962, ConAC determined to reorganize its reserve wings by establishing groups with support elements for each of its troop carrier squadrons. This reorganization would facilitate mobilization of elements of wings in various combinations when needed. However, as this plan was entering its implementation phase, another partial mobilization, which included the 349th Wing and its flying squadrons, occurred for the Cuban Missile Crisis. Only four hours after the first call to report for duty was made, 95 percent of the wing's flying personnel had checked in and were ready to move. In addition to its four squadrons, the 733d Troop Carrier Squadron was also activated and assigned to the wing during this mobilization. During the mobilization, they served for one month to airlift troops and supplies to the buildup of military forces in the south Florida area.

The formation of new troop carrier groups was delayed until February for wings that had been mobilized. The 938th Troop Carrier Group at Hamilton, the 939th Troop Carrier Group at Portland, the 940th Troop Carrier Group at McClellan, and the 941st Troop Carrier Group at Paine were all assigned to the wing on 11 February.

On 1 June 1966, the 349th was redesignated the 349th Military Airlift Wing, its gaining command was changed to Military Airlift Command and the wing converted to the C-124 Globemaster II intercontinental airlifter. The wing was again mobilized on 26 January 1968 in response to the 1968 Pueblo Crisis. During the Vietnam War, the wing airlifted many thousands of tons of cargo across the Pacific to support U.S. forces throughout the Southeast Asia and Pacific theaters of operations. In 1969, the 349th moved to Travis Air Force Base, and became the second reserve associate wing, teaming with the 60th Military Airlift Wing at Travis.

During the Persian Gulf War, 1990–1991, more than 1,750 people from selected units were activated for service in support of Operationd Desert Shield and Desert Storm. Although some units and individuals deployed to the Persian Gulf, others deployed to Europe and other overseas locations, while some remained in the United States and still others remained at Travis AFB.

=== Post Cold War era ===
On 1 February 1992, the 349th adopted the USAF objective organization was redesignated the 349th Airlift Wing, deleting the word "military" from its name to conform with the active duty Air Force's reorganization and realignment policies. The group was reactivated as the 349th Operations Group and the operational squadrons were reassigned from the wing to the group.

In September 1994, the McDonnell Douglas KC-10 Extender aerial refueling mission was added to the Wing and became the 349th Air Mobility Wing, the only Air Force Reserve unit at the time to fly three types of aircraft: the Lockheed C-141 Starlifter, the Lockheed C-5 Galaxy and the KC-10.

In December 1997, the C-141 was retired from service at Travis. Some were sent to McChord Air Force Base, Washington. and McGuire AFB, New Jersey. The retired Starlifters went to the 309th Aerospace Maintenance and Regeneration Group at Davis–Monthan Air Force Base, Arizona.

=== Global War on Terrorism ===
In the aftermath of the terrorist attacks on the Pentagon and New York City's World Trade Center, the 349th provided airlift, mortuary affairs personnel, and other vital support in the early stages of Operation Resolve; Operation Noble Eagle, the mobilization of reservists to provide security after the attacks; Operation Infinite Justice, operations in Afghanistan; and Operation Enduring Freedom, the Global War on Terrorism.

With the McDonnell Douglas C-17 Globemaster III arrival at Travis in Summer 2006, the wing and its host became the only units in the country to fly three major aircraft. On 25 May 2006, the 301st Airlift Squadron converted from the C-5 to the C-17 and on 25 June 2006, the 945th Aircraft Maintenance Squadron was activated to support the Globemaster III.

In 2021, the Wing consists of the following major units:

- 349th Operations Group
- 349th Maintenance Group
- 349th Mission Support Group
- 349th Medical Group

The 349th AMW is also home to the 349th Aeromedical Evacuation Squadron which is responsible for treating patients in flight; the 349th Airlift Control Flight, tasked to enter austere locations and prepare for USAF aircraft arrival; and the 349th Medical Squadron, capable of providing hospital services worldwide, in a contingency environment.

== Lineage ==
- Established as the 349th Troop Carrier Wing, Medium on 10 May 1949

Activated in the reserve on 27 June 1949
Ordered to active service on 1 April 1951
Inactivated on 2 April 1951

- Redesignated 349th Fighter-Bomber Wing on 26 May 1952

Activated in the reserve on 13 June 1952
Redesignated 349th Troop Carrier Wing, Medium on 1 September 1957
Ordered to active service on 28 October 1962
Relieved from active service on 28 November 1962
Redesignated 349th Military Airlift Wing on 1 June 1966
Ordered to active service on 26 January 1968
Relieved from active duty on 1 June 1969
Redesignated: 349th Military Airlift Wing (Associate) on 25 July 1969
Redesignated: 349th Airlift Wing (Associate) on 1 February 1992
Redesignated: '349th Air Mobility Wing (Associate) on 1 July 1994
Redesignated: 349th Air Mobility Wing on 1 October 1994

=== Assignments ===
- Fourth Air Force, 27 June 1949 – 2 April 1951
- Fourth Air Reserve District, 13 June 1952
- Fourth Air Force, 1 December 1952
- Sixth Air Force Reserve Region, 1 September 1960
- Twelfth Air Force, 28 October 1962
- Sixth Air Force Reserve Region, 28 November 1962
- Twenty-Second Air Force, 26 January 1968
- Sixth Air Force Reserve Region, 2 June 1969
- Western Air Force Reserve Region, 31 December 1969
- Fourth Air Force, 8 October 1976 – present

=== Components ===
Groups

- 349th Troop Carrier Group (later 349th Fighter-Bomber Group, 349th Troop Carrier Group, 349th Operations Group): 27 June 1949 – 2 April 1951; 13 June 1952 – 14 April 1959; 1 August 1992 – present
- 921st Military Airlift Group: 26 January 1968 – 2 June 1969 (not operational, 1 August 1968 – 1 June 1969)
- 938th Troop Carrier Group (later 938th Military Airlift Group): 11 February 1963 – 1 July 1973 (not operational 29 March 1968 – 1 June 1969; detached 25 July – 14 December 1969)
- 939th Troop Carrier Group (later 939th Tactical Airlift Group, 939th Military Airlift Group): 11 February 1963 – 26 January 1968; 15 June 1969 – 1 July 1973 (detached 25 July – 14 December 1969)
- 940th Troop Carrier Group (later 940th Air Transport Group, 940th Military Airlift Group): 11 February 1963 – 26 January 1968
- 941st Troop Carrier Group (later 941st Air Transport Group 941st Military Airlift Group): 11 February 1963 – 25 July 1969 (not operational 1 August 1968 – 21 May 1969)
- 944th Military Airlift Group: 25 July 1969 – 1 July 1973 (detached 25 July – 14 December 1969)

Squadrons

- 67th Military Airlift Squadron: attached 1 August 1968 – 1 June 1969
- 97th Troop Carrier Squadron: 14 April 1959 – 11 February 1963; attached 1 August 1968 – 21 May 1969
- 301st Military Airlift Squadron: 1 July 1973 – 1 August 1992
- 312th Troop Carrier Squadron (later 312th Military Airlift Squadron, 312th Airlift Squadron): 14 April 1959 – 11 February 1963; attached 29 March 1968 – 1 June 1969; assigned 1 July 1973 – 1 August 1992
- 313th Troop Carrier Squadron: 14 April 1959 – 11 February 1963
- 314th Troop Carrier Squadron: 14 April 1959 – 11 February 1963
- 733d Troop Carrier Squadron: 28 October – 28 November 1962
- 708th Airlift Squadron: 1 July 1973 – 1 August 1992
- 710th Military Airlift Squadron: 1 July 1973 – 1 August 1992
- 8649th Replacement Training Squadron: attached (further attached to 349th Fighter-Bomber Group), 20 August 1954 – 6 February 1956

=== Stations ===
- Hamilton Air Force Base, California, 27 June 1949 – 2 April 1951
- Hamilton Air Force Base, California, 13 June 1952
- Travis Air Force Base, California, 25 July 1969 – present

=== Aircraft ===
- North American T-6 Texan, 1949–1950, 1952–1954
- Beechcraft T-7 Navigator, 1949–1951
- Beechcraft T-11 Wichita, 1949–1951
- Curtiss C-46 Commando, 1949–1951; 1952–1958
- North American T-28 Trojan, 1953–1956
- Lockheed T-33 T-Bird 1953–1957
- North American F-51 Mustang, 1953–1954
- Lockheed F-80 Shooting Star, 1953–1956
- Beechcraft C-45 Expeditor, 1955–1956
- Douglas C-47 Skytrain, 1955–1956
- Republic F-84 Thunderjet, 1956–1957
- Fairchild C-119 Flying Boxcar, 1958–1968
- Douglas C-124 Globemaster II, 1965–1969
- Lockheed C-141 Starlifter, 1969–1998
- Lockheed C-5 Galaxy, 1972–present
- McDonnell Douglas KC-10 Extender, 1994–2024
- Boeing C-17 Globemaster III, 2007–present
- Boeing KC-46 Pegasus, 2023-present
