= 729th Airlift Squadron =

729th Airlift Squadron

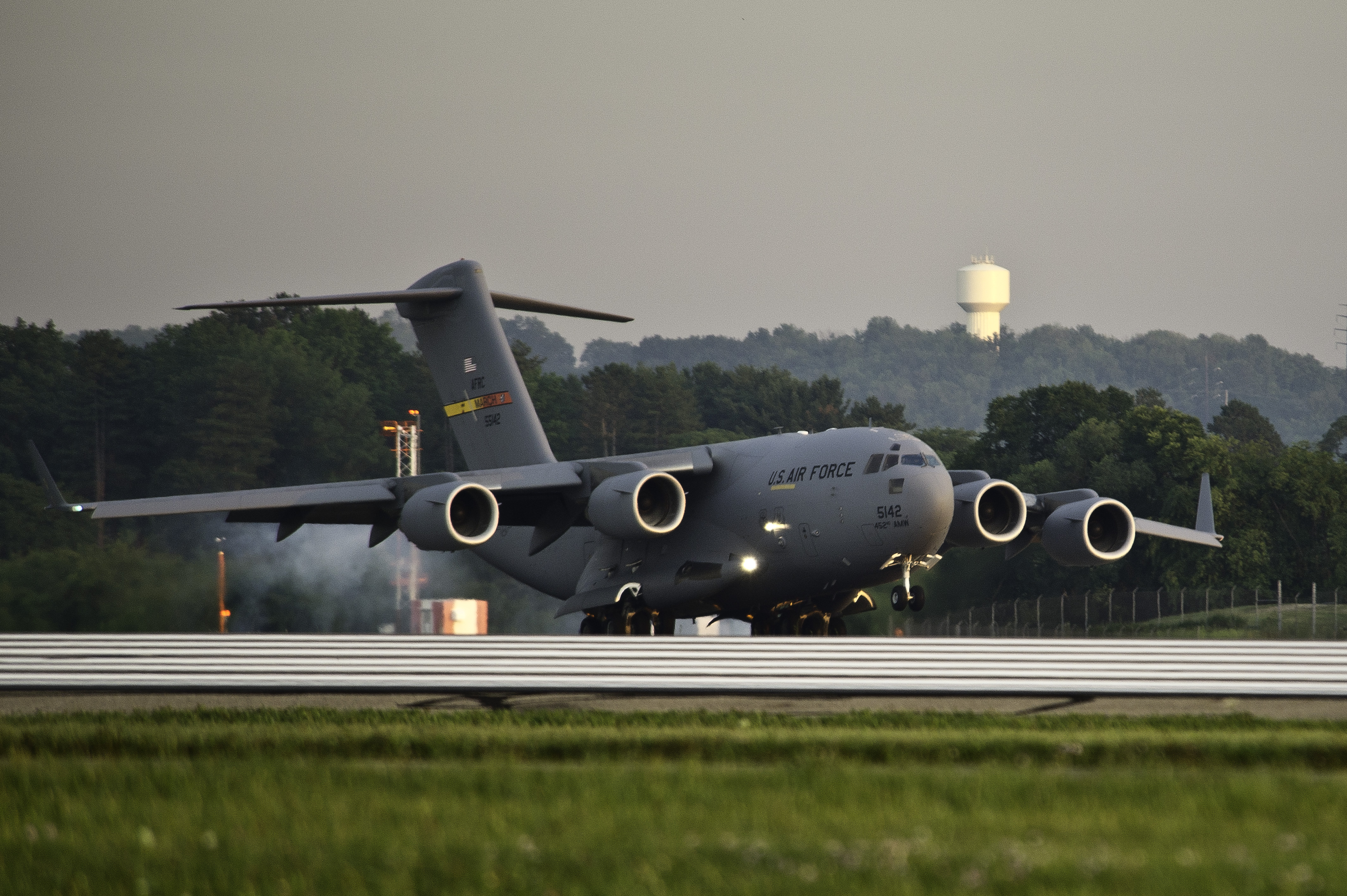
- 729th Airlift Squadron C-17 Globemaster III
- Active: 1943–1945; 1947–1952; 1952–present
- Country: United States
- Branch: United States Air Force
- Role: Airlift
- Part of: Air Force Reserve Command
- Garrison/HQ: March Air Reserve Base
- Engagements: European Theater of Operations; Korean War
- Decorations: Distinguished Unit Citation; Air Force Outstanding Unit Award; Republic of Korea Presidential Unit Citation; Republic of Vietnam Gallantry Cross with Palm

Insignia
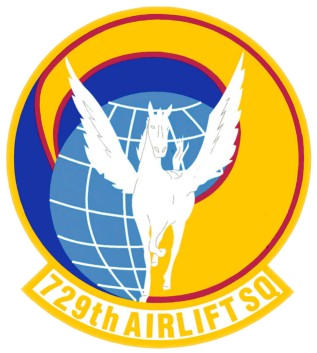
- 729th Airlift Squadron emblem (Note: Modified 2 May 1995.)

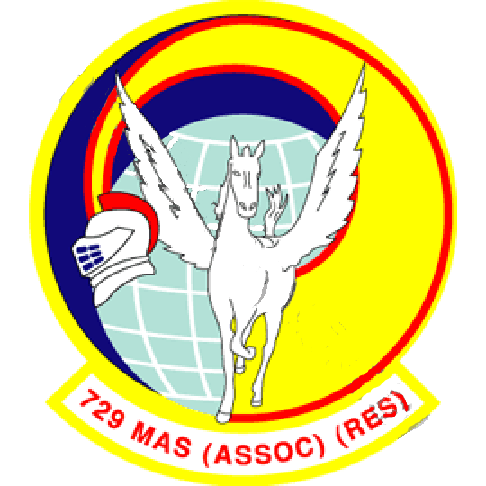
- 729th Military Airlift Sq emblem (Note: Approved 29 April 1980.)

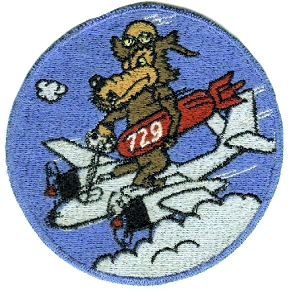
- Unofficial 729th Bombardment Squadron emblem (B-26 era)

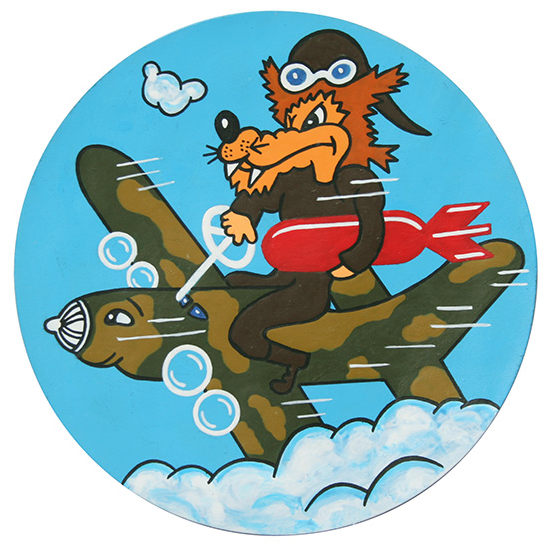
- 729th Bombardment Squadron emblem (Note: Approved 1 October 1943. Description: On a light blue disc, a caricatured tan wolf, wearing flight suit and helmet brown, riding astride of a flying fortress camouflaged green and brown, grasping white steering wheel in right forepaw, and holding red aerial bomb under left forepaw, all between small white cloud formation in dexter chief and large white cloud formation in sinister base and emitting white speed lines to rear.)
- World War II fuselage code (Note: The squadron did not use this code until the end of the war, although it had been assigned earlier. Instead, the squadron's aircraft only carried the individual aircraft letter, preceded by a bar. Freeman, p. 289.): M3

Aircraft flown
- Transport: C-17 Globemaster III

The 729th Airlift Squadron is a United States Air Force Reserve squadron, assigned to the 452d Operations Group, stationed at March Air Reserve Base, California. It operates Boeing C-17 Globemaster III aircraft providing global airlift any time, any place.

The squadron was first activated as the 729th Bombardment Squadron in 1943. After training in the United States with the Boeing B-17 Flying Fortress, the squadron deployed to the European Theater of Operations, participating in the strategic bombing campaign against Germany. It earned a Distinguished Unit Citation (DUC) during an attack on a German jet fighter base near Kaltenkirchen in April 1945. Following V-E Day, the squadron returned to the United States and was inactivated.

The squadron was activated again in the reserves in 1947. Two years later, it began to train with Douglas B-26 Invaders. In August 1950, the squadron was one of the first reserve units mobilized for the Korean War. After filling its ranks and undergoing intensive training, the squadron deployed to Far East Air Forces and began flying combat missions. It was awarded two additional DUCs for its operations in Korea. In May 1952, the squadron was inactivated and its personnel and equipment were transferred to a regular unit that was simultaneously activated.

The squadron was activated in the reserves again two months later as the 729th Tactical Reconnaissance Squadron. It returned to the light bomber mission in 1955, but the Air Force's reserve units were converting to the airlift mission, and the squadron became the 729th Troop Carrier Squadron in July 1957, and has served in tactical and strategic airlift roles since then.

== History ==
=== World War II ===
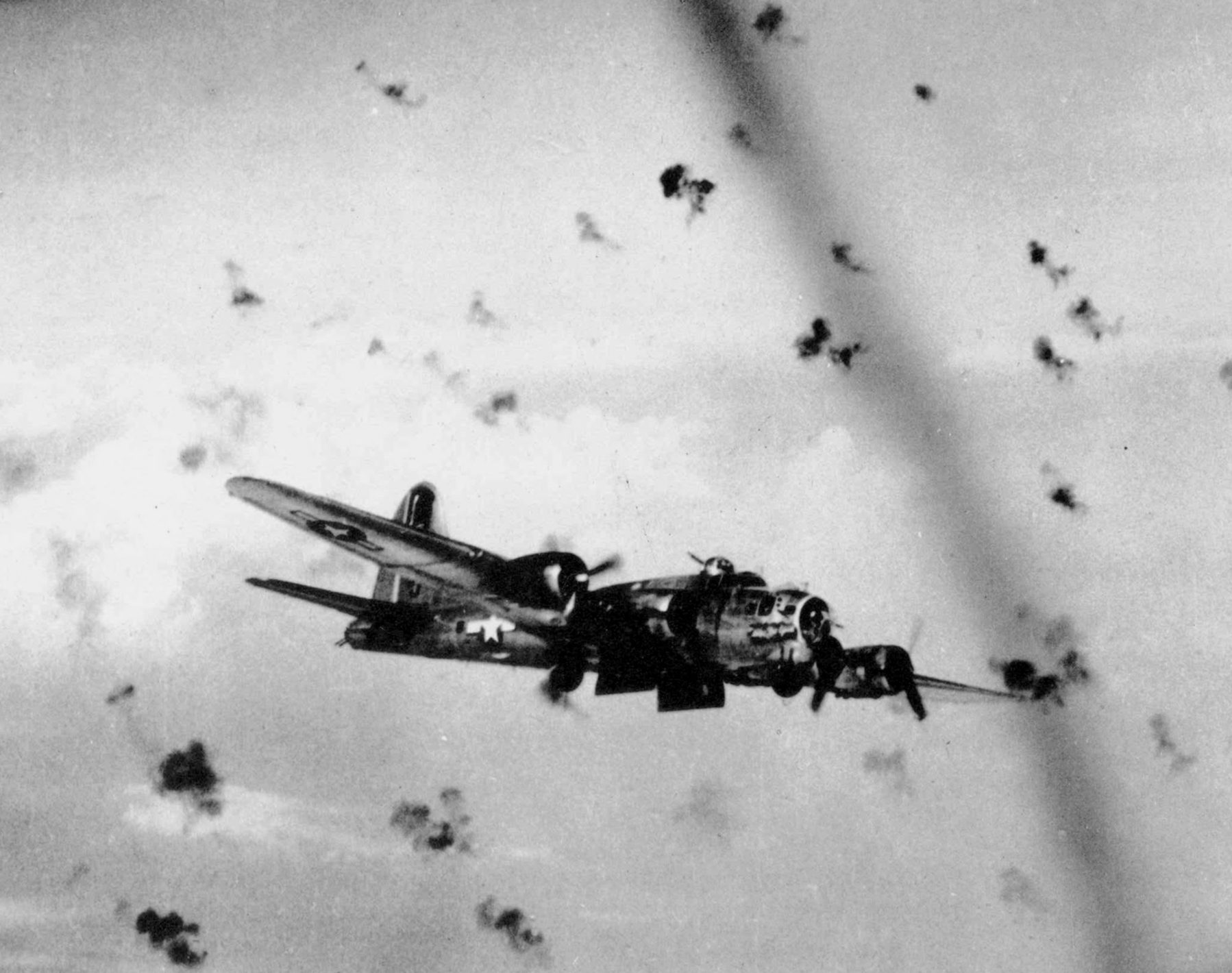
452 Bomb Group B-17G Flying Fortress flying through flak

The squadron was first activated in June 1943 at Geiger Field, Washington as the 729th Bombardment Squadron, one of the four original squadrons of the 452d Bombardment Group. Later that month, it moved to Rapid City Army Air Base, South Dakota and began to train with the Boeing B-17 Flying Fortress. It continued training with Second Air Force until December, when it began its movement to the European Theater of Operations. The ground echelon staged through Camp Shanks and sailed on the RMS Queen Elizabeth on 2 January 1944. The air echelon deployed via the South Atlantic air ferry route

The squadron established itself at RAF Deopham Green in January 1944, and began operations on 4 February 1944 with a strike on an aircraft assembly plant near Brunswick. Its strategic targets included railroad marshalling yards near Frankfurt, aircraft factories near Regensberg and Kassel. the ball bearing factory at Schweinfurt and an oil refinery near Bohlen. In September 1944, the squadron participated in the third shuttle mission, striking Chemnitz before landing in bases in the Soviet Union.

The 729th was occasionally diverted to support tactical operations. It hit airfields, V-weapon launching sites, bridges and other objectives in preparations for Operation Overlord, the invasion of Normandy. It bombed enemy positions to support Operation Cobra, the breakout at Saint Lo in July 1944 and the attacks on Brest, France in August. It supported Operation Market Garden, airborne attacks in the Netherlands in September and, during the Battle of the Bulge, struck German lines of communication. It struck an airfield to support Operation Varsity, the airborne assault across the Rhine.

Shortly before the end of the war, on 7 April, the squadron struck the jet fighter base at Kaltenkirchen, pressing the attack despite strong fighter opposition, earning a Distinguished Unit Citation. It flew its last mission of the war on 21 April against marshalling yards at Ingolstadt.

After V-E Day, in August 1945, the squadron returned to the United States (the ground echelon once again sailed on the RMS Queen Elizabeth) and was inactivated at Sioux Falls Army Air Field, South Dakota.

=== Reserve duty and Korean War call-up ===
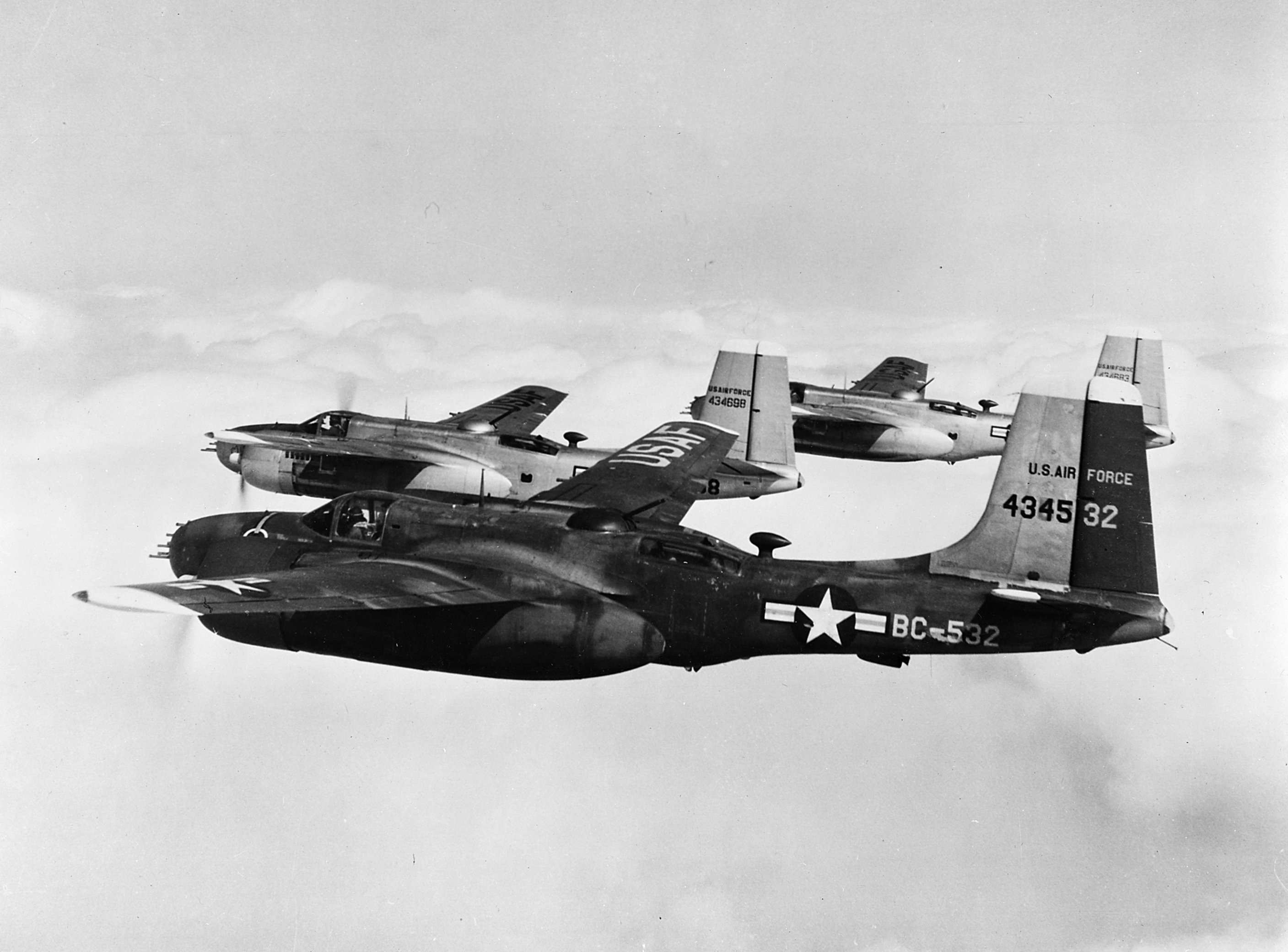
B-26Bs of the 452d Bomb Wing in Korea (Note: Aircraft in foreground is Douglas B-26B-61-DL Invader)

The squadron was reactivated in the reserve at Long Beach Army Air Field, California in 1947 as a very heavy bomber squadron, but conducted proficiency flying with a variety of trainer airplanes under the supervision of the 416th AAF Base Unit (later the 2347th Air Force Reserve Training Center). In a 1949 reorganization of the reserves, it became a light bomber squadron and began to equip and train with Douglas B-26 Invaders. (Note: Robertson indicates the training began in 1949. Robertson, Factsheet 729 Airlift Squadron. Maurer, however, indicates that B-26 training did not begin until 1950. Maurer, Combat Squadrons, p. 725.) The squadron was manned at only 25% of its authorized strength.

The squadron was mobilized for the Korean War in August 1950 in the first wave of reserve mobilizations. To help bring it up to strength, the squadron was augmented by reservists assigned to the 448th Bombardment Wing, which was also stationed at Long Beach, but remained in reserve status until the following year. The 729th was a squadron of one of the first two reserve wings to be mobilized, (Note: The other was the 437th Troop Carrier Wing.) and administrative provisions for mobilization proved inadequate, with numerous reservists never receiving the telegrams calling them to active duty.

The unit moved to George Air Force Base, California for intensive training and to be brought up to full strength. In October, the squadron deployed to Itazuke Air Base, Japan to begin combat operations. It entered combat two days later, depending on support from organizations already in theater and not waiting for support from the 452d Wing's ground echelon, which arrived by ship in November. The squadron operated from Japan and later from the southern tip of Korea. The squadron flew armed reconnaissance, intruder and interdiction missions. It supported ground troops and attacked tactical targets.

On 23 March 1951, the squadron led troop carrier aircraft carrying the 187th Airborne Infantry Regiment in an aerial assault on Munsan-ni, strafing the front lines of the Chinese Communist Forces and dropping bombs on enemy targets. Prior to June 1951, the squadron had been conducting strikes primarily in the daytime. However, due to the extent of enemy night movements, after June, the 729th focused on night operations. In May 1952, the squadron was inactivated and returned to the reserve. Its mission, personnel and aircraft were transferred to the 37th Bombardment Squadron, which was simultaneously activated at Pusan East (K-9) Air Base, South Korea.

=== Reconnaissance and Bombardment in the reserves ===
The squadron was redesignated the 729th Tactical Reconnaissance Squadron and activated in June 1952 at Long Beach, where it absorbed some of the resources of the 921st Reserve Training Wing, which was inactivated. The reserve mobilization for the Korean War, however, had left the reserve without aircraft, and the unit did not receive aircraft until July 1952. Despite its tactical reconnaissance name, it was first equipped with Curtiss C-46 Commando transports. The following year, it began to equip with a mix of aircraft, including The B-26 and North American F-51 Mustang. In 1954 it received its first jets, Lockheed F-80 Shooting Stars.

In 1955, the squadron once again became the 729th Bombardment Squadron and trained with the Invader as a tactical bombardment unit. However, at this time, the Joint Chiefs of Staff were pressuring the Air Force to provide more wartime airlift. At the same time, about 150 Fairchild C-119 Flying Boxcars became available from the active force. Consequently, in November 1956 the Air Force directed Continental Air Command (ConAC) to convert units to the troop carrier mission by September 1957. In July 1957, the squadron became the 729th Troop Carrier Squadron.

=== Tactical airlift ===
As a troop carrier squadron the unit transitioned to the C-119 and flew them from Long Beach until reserve flying operations there ended in the fall of 1960 and the 452d Troop Carrier Wing moved to March Air Force Base. The squadron had been assigned directly to the wing since April 1959, when ConAC converted its flying wings to the dual deputy organization (Note: Under this plan flying squadrons reported to the wing Deputy Commander for Operations and maintenance squadrons reported to the wing Deputy Commander for Maintenance.) and inactivated the 452d Troop Carrier Group. At March, in place of active duty support for reserve units, ConAC used the Air Reserve Technician Program, in which a cadre of the unit consisted of full-time personnel who were simultaneously civilian employees of the Air Force and held rank as members of the reserves.

=== Activation of groups under the wing ===
Since 1955, the Air Force had been detaching Air Force Reserve squadrons from their parent wing locations to separate sites. The concept offered several advantages: communities were more likely to accept the smaller squadrons than the large wings and the location of separate squadrons in smaller population centers would facilitate recruiting and manning. In time, the detached squadron program proved successful in attracting additional participants. Although the dispersal of flying units was not a problem when the entire wing was called to active service, mobilizing a single flying squadron and elements to support it proved difficult. This weakness was demonstrated in the partial mobilization of reserve units during the Berlin Crisis of 1961. To resolve this, at the start of 1962, ConAC determined to reorganize its reserve wings by establishing groups with support elements for each of its troop carrier squadrons. This reorganization would facilitate mobilization of elements of wings in various combinations when needed. However, as this plan was entering its implementation phase, another partial mobilization occurred for the Cuban Missile Crisis. The formation of new troop carrier groups was delayed until January for wings that had not been mobilized. The 943d Troop Carrier Group was formed at March on 17 January as the headquarters for the 729th and its supporting units.

In March 1968, the squadron moved to Norton Air Force Base, California, but it would only fly C-119s from Norton for a year.

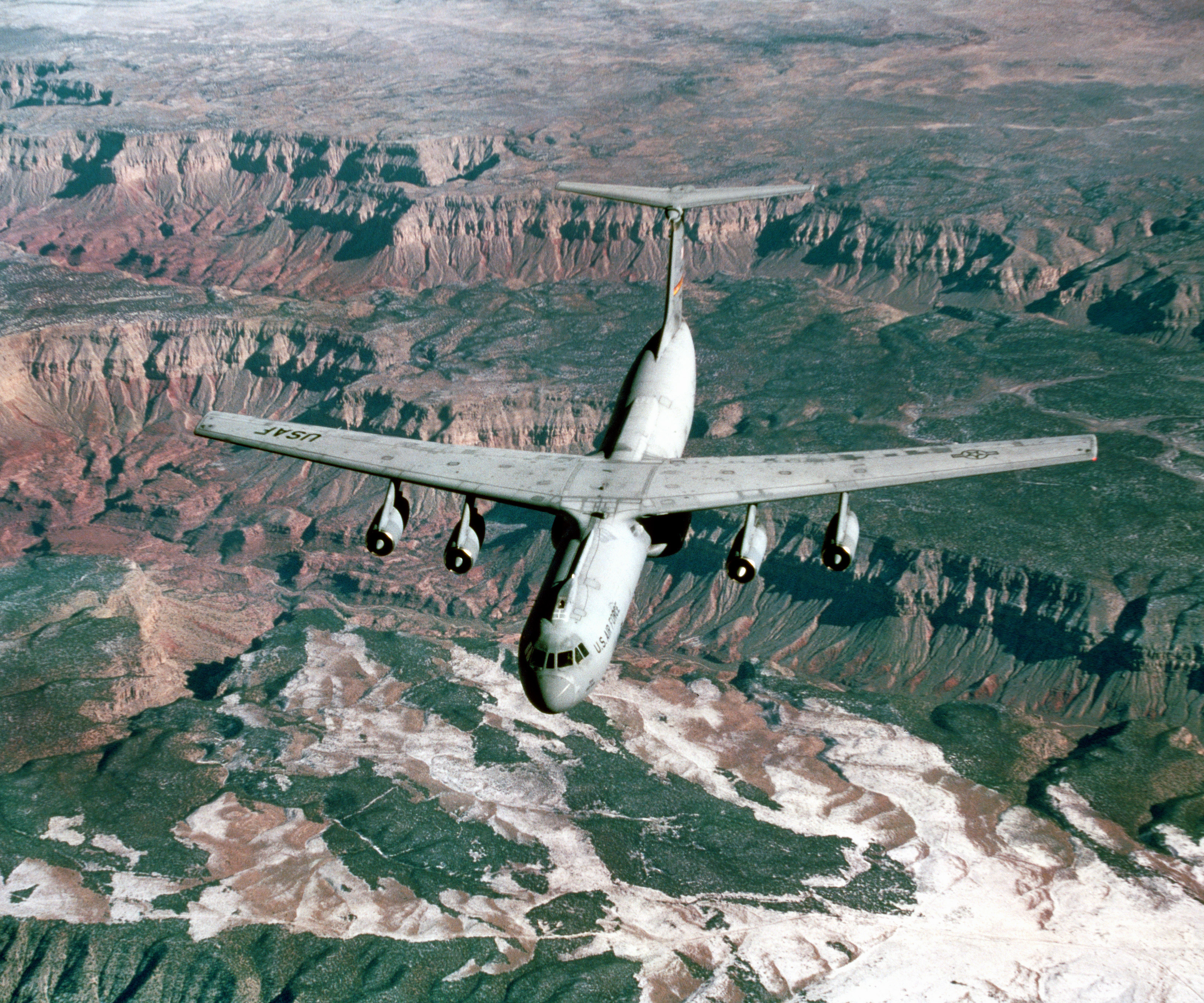
Squadron C-141B Starlifter over the Grand Canyon in 1998

=== Strategic airlift ===
By 1968 regular air force military airlift squadrons were operating the Lockheed C-141 Starlifter, while reserve heavy airlift units still flew the obsolete Douglas C-124 Globemaster II. As the Globemaster was retired, Air Force Reserve formed associate units with the C-141 In this program reserve units flew and maintained aircraft owned by an associated regular unit. On 25 April 1969, the 729th transferred its aircraft and was reassigned to the 944th Military Airlift Group as an associate of the active duty 63d Military Airlift Wing. In 1973, Air Force Reserve inactivated its reserve associate groups and the squadron was assigned directly to the 445th Military Airlift Wing. Missions the 729th has flown included humanitarian relief, aeromedical flights, and airdrops of supplies and paratroopers.

In August 1992, Air Force Reserve Command reorganized its flying wings under the Objective Wing model. The squadron, along with the other flying squadrons of the 445th Wing, was assigned to the reactivated 445th Operations Group. As a result of the closure of Norton as part of the United States Department of Defense's 1988 Base Realignment and Closure Commission program, on 14 August 1993, the 729th returned to March Air Force Base, where it was assigned to the 452d Operations Group and once more operated its own planes. The 729th was renamed the 729th Airlift Squadron on 1 February 1992. The squadron retired its C-141 Starlifter fleet in 2005.

On 9 August 2005 the wing received its first Boeing C-17 Globemaster III strategic airlifter, named "Spirit of California". This was the first of nine C-17s assigned to the 452nd, the wing became the first Air Force Reserve Command C-17 Globemaster III unit.

== Lineage ==
- Constituted as the 729th Bombardment Squadron (Heavy) on 14 May 1943

Activated on 1 June 1943
Redesignated 729th Bombardment Squadron, Heavy on 20 August 1943
Inactivated on 28 August 1945

- Redesignated 729th Bombardment Squadron, Very Heavy on 13 May 1947

Activated in the reserve on 12 July 1947
Redesignated 729th Bombardment Squadron, Light on 27 June 1949
Ordered to active service on 10 August 1950
Redesignated 729th Bombardment Squadron, Light, Night Intruder on 25 June 1951
Relieved from active service and inactivated on 10 May 1952

- Redesignated 729th Tactical Reconnaissance Squadron on 6 June 1952

Activated in the reserve on 13 June 1952
Redesignated 729th Bombardment Squadron, Tactical on 22 May 1955
Redesignated 729th Troop Carrier Squadron, Medium on 1 July 1957
Redesignated 729th Tactical Airlift Squadron on 1 July 1967
Redesignated 729th Military Airlift Squadron (Associate) on 25 April 1969
Redesignated 729th Airlift Squadron (Associate) on 1 February 1992
Redesignated 729th Airlift Squadron on 1 April 1993

=== Assignments ===
- 452d Bombardment Group, 1 June 1943 – 28 August 1945
- 452d Bombardment Group, 12 July 1947 – 10 May 1952
- 452d Tactical Reconnaissance Group (later 452d Bombardment Group, 452d Troop Carrier Group), 13 June 1952
- 452d Troop Carrier Wing, 14 April 1959
- 943d Troop Carrier Group (later 943 Tactical Airlift Group), 17 January 1963
- 944th Military Airlift Group, 25 April 1969
- 445th Military Airlift Wing, 1 July 1973
- 445th Operations Group, 1 August 1992
- 452d Operations Group, 1 May 1994 – present

=== Stations ===
- Geiger Field, Washington, 1 June 1943
- Rapid City Army Air Base, South Dakota, c. 13 June 1943
- Pendleton Field, Oregon, 10 October 1943
- Walla Walla Army Air Base, Washington, c. 4 November–December 1943
- RAF Deopham Green (AAF-142), England, c. 8 January 1944 – 6 August 1945
- Sioux Falls Army Air Field, South Dakota, c. 12 – 28 August 1945
- Long Beach Army Air Field (later Long Beach Municipal Airport), California, 19 April 1947
- George Air Force Base, California, 10 August – October 1950
- Itazuke Air Base, Japan, 26 October 1950
- Miho Air Base, Japan, c. 10 December 1950
- Pusan East (K-9) Air Base, South Korea, 17 May 1951 – 10 May 1952
- Long Beach Municipal Airport, California, 13 June 1952
- March Air Force Base, California, 14 October 1960
- Norton Air Force Base, California, 25 March 1968
- March Air Force Base (later March Air Reserve Base), California, 14 August 1993 – present

=== Aircraft ===
- Boeing B-17 Flying Fortress (1943–1945)
- North American T-6 Texan (1948–1950, 1952–1954)
- Beechcraft T-7 Navigator (1948–1950)
- BeechcraftT-11 Kansan (1948–1950)
- Douglas B-26 Invader (1949–1952, 1955–1957)
- North American F-51 Mustang (1953–1954)
- Lockheed T-33 T-Bird (1954–1955)
- Lockheed P-80 Shooting Star (1954–1955)
- Curtiss C-46 Commando (1957–1958)
- Fairchild C-119 Flying Boxcar (1958–1969)
- Lockheed C-141 Starlifter (1969–2005)
- Boeing C-17 Globemaster III (2005–present)

=== Awards and campaigns ===
Award streamer	Award	Dates	Notes
	Distinguished Unit Citation	7 April 1945	Germany 729th Bombardment Squadron
	Distinguished Unit Citation	9 July-27 November 1951	Korea 729th Bombardment Squadron
	Distinguished Unit Citation	28 November 1951-30 April 1952	Korea 729th Bombardment Squadron
	Air Force Outstanding Unit Award	1 July 1970-30 June 1971	729th Military Airlift Squadron
	Air Force Outstanding Unit Award	1 September 1985-31 August 1987	729th Military Airlift Squadron
	Air Force Outstanding Unit Award	1 September 1995-31 August 1996	729th Airlift Squadron
	Air Force Outstanding Unit Award	1 September 1997-31 August 1999	729th Airlift Squadron
	Air Force Outstanding Unit Award	1 October 2002–30 September 2004	729th Airlift Squadron
	Air Force Outstanding Unit Award	1 October 2004–30 September 2006	729th Airlift Squadron
	Air Force Outstanding Unit Award	1 October 2006–30 September 2008	729th Airlift Squadron
	Air Force Outstanding Unit Award	1 October 2008–30 September 2010	729th Airlift Squadron
	Korean Presidential Unit Citation	27 October 1950-27 October 1951	729th Bombardment Squadron
	Vietnamese Gallantry Cross with Palm	25 July 1968-28 January 1973	729th Tactical Airlift Squadron (later 729th Military Airlift Squadron)

Campaign Streamer	Campaign	Dates	Notes
	Air Offensive, Europe	8 January 1944 – 5 June 1944	729th Bombardment Squadron
	Air Combat, EAME Theater	8 January 1944 – 11 May 1945	729th Bombardment Squadron
	Normandy	6 June 1944 – 24 July 1944	729th Bombardment Squadron
	Northern France	25 July 1944 – 14 September 1944	729th Bombardment Squadron
	Rhineland	15 September 1944 – 21 March 1945	729th Bombardment Squadron
	Ardennes-Alsace	16 December 1944 – 25 January 1945	729th Bombardment Squadron
	Central Europe	22 March 1944 – 21 May 1945	729th Bombardment Squadron
	CCF Intervention	3 November 1950 – 24 January 1951	729th Bombardment Squadron
	1st UN Counteroffensive	25 January 1951 – 21 April 1951	729th Bombardment Squadron
	CCF Spring Offensive	22 April 1951 – 9 July 1951	729th Bombardment Squadron
	UN Summer-Fall Offensive	9 July 1951 – 27 November 1951	729th Bombardment Squadron
	Second Korean Winter	28 November 1951 – 30 April 1952	729th Bombardment Squadron
	Korea Summer-Fall 1952	1 May 1952 – 10 May 1952	729th Bombardment Squadron

== See also ==
- List of A-26 Invader operators
- List of United States Air Force airlift squadrons
- B-17 Flying Fortress units of the United States Army Air Forces
