= 452nd Operations Group =

United States military unit

452d Operations Group

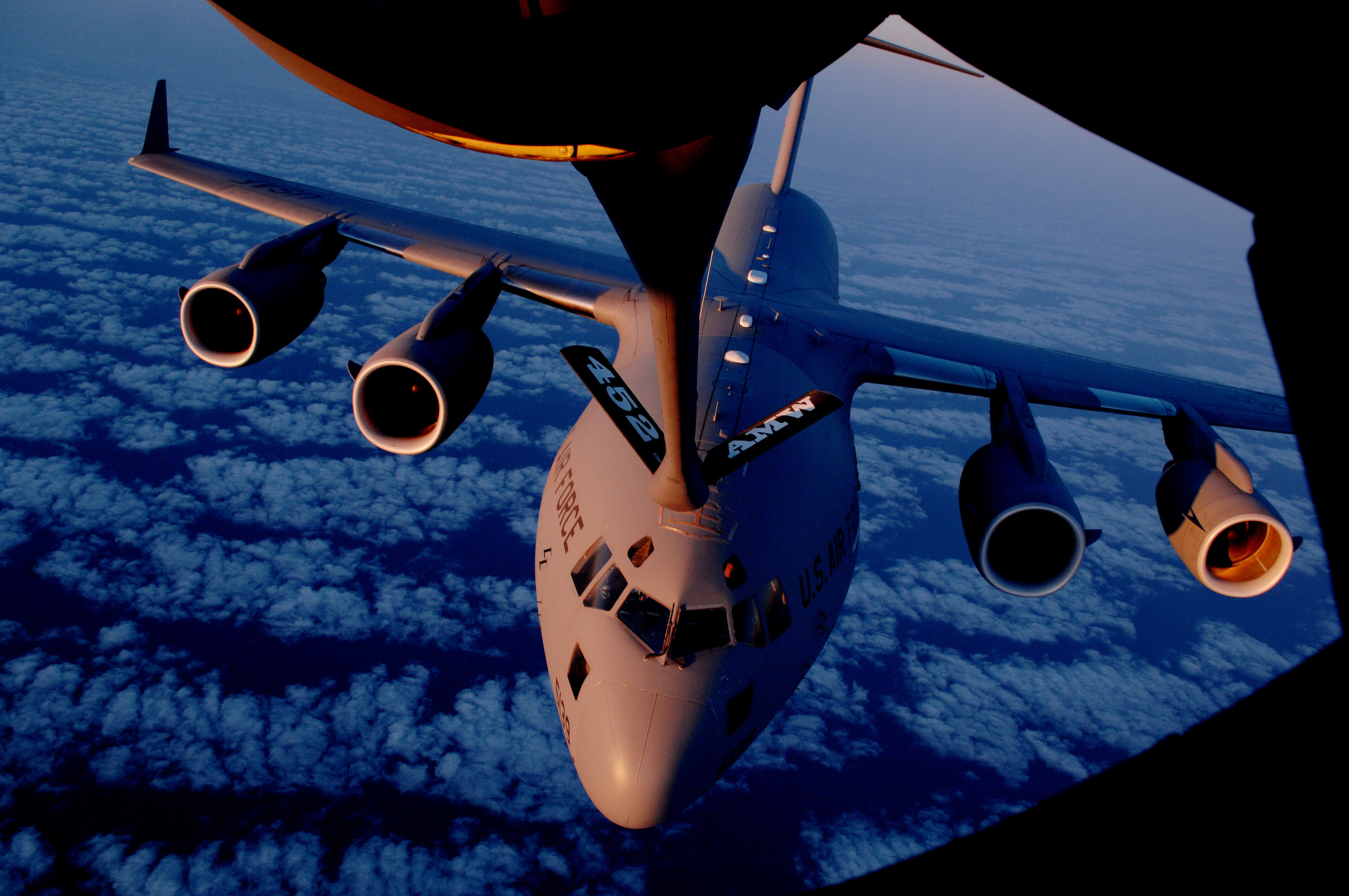
- A C-17 Globemaster III of the group's 729th Airlift Squadron being refueled by a KC-135R Stratotanker of the group's 336th Air Refueling Squadron
- Active: 1943–1945; 1947–1952; 1952–1959; 1992–present
- Country: United States
- Branch: United States Air Force
- Role: Air mobility
- Part of: Air Force Reserve Command
- Garrison/HQ: March ARB, California
- Motto: Labor ad Futurum (Latin for 'Work of the Future')
- Engagements: European Theater of Operations; Korean War
- Decorations: Distinguished Unit Citation; Air Force Outstanding Unit Award; Republic of Korea Presidential Unit Citation

Insignia
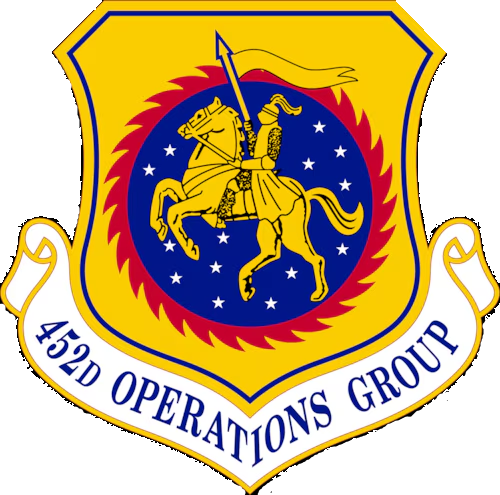
- 452 Operations Group emblem (Note: Approved 6 January 2025. Description: Or, on a hurt spattered with mullets argent and having a border rayone gules, a horse rampant bearing a knight in armor of the first [color] and detailed brown, grasping a lance point to chief flying a pennant fesswise also of the first [color] outlined azure.) (Note: While assigned to the 452d Wing, the group uses the wing emblem with the group designation on the scroll. AF Instruction 84-105, Organizational Lineage, Honors and History, 27 April 2017, paragraph 3.3.3.)

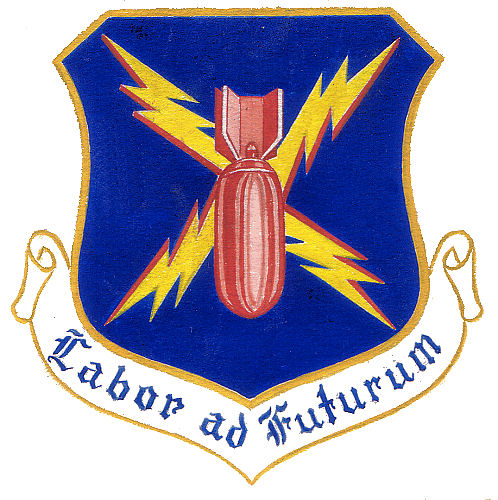
- 452d Bombardment Group emblem (Note: Approved 8 March 1956. Description: Azure, a bomb, point downward, in pale gules, highlighted and fimbriated argent, superimposed over two lightning flashes or, shaded of the second [color], highlighted and fimbriated of the third [color]; the shield edged argent, gules and or.) (Note: This emblem on a differently shaped shield, was used by the group during World War II. Watkins, p. 96.)
- World War II tail code: Square L

The 452d Operations Group is the flying component of the 452d Air Mobility Wing, assigned to the United States Air Force Reserve. The group is stationed at March Air Reserve Base, California.

During World War II, as the 452d Bombardment Group (Heavy), it was an Eighth Air Force Boeing B-17 Flying Fortress unit in England, stationed at RAF Deopham Green. 1st Lieutenant Donald J. Gott and 2nd Lieutenant William E. Metzger, Jr were both awarded the Medal of Honor for their heroic actions.

The present day 452d works to maintain a special relationship with the 452d Bomb Group Memorial Association to keep its heritage alive.

== Mission ==
The group is to organize, train and equip aircrews to provide air refueling and strategic airlift any time, any place. The Group's aircraft operate under widely varying situations ranging from small movements in battle to large movements over long distances.

The group also has a medical squadron which augments joint forces with aeromedical evacuation aircrews who provide medical care for sick and injured patients transported by air.

== Units ==
The group includes a Boeing C-17 Globemaster III flying squadron and a Boeing KC-135R Stratotanker flying squadron as well as an aeromedical evacuation squadron:

- 336th Air Refueling Squadron (KC-135R)
- 729th Airlift Squadron (C-17)
- 452nd Aeromedical Evacuation Squadron
- 452nd Operations Support Squadron
- 452nd Contingency Response Squadron
- 912th Air Refueling Squadron - active duty Associate flying KC-135R

== History ==
=== World War II ===
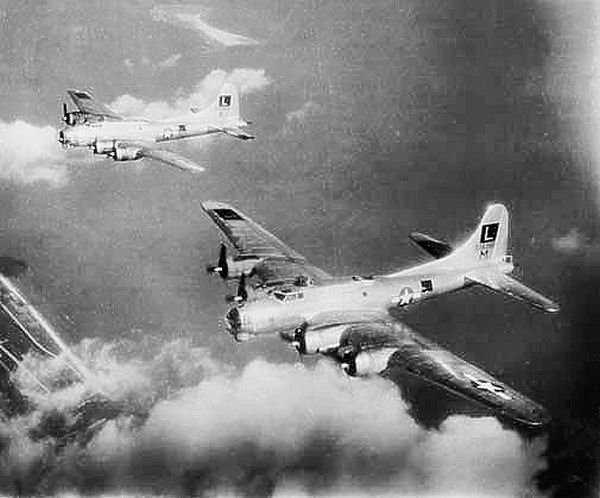
B-17s of the 452d Bomb Group.

The 452 Bombardment Group (Heavy) was established on 14 May 1943 and activated on 1 June 1943 at Geiger Field, Washington. The unit was transferred to Rapid City AAB, South Dakota on 15 June 1943 and trained there until early October 1943. It had been redesignated as 452 Bombardment Group, Heavy on 20 August 1943. The unit was moved to Pendleton Field Oregon on 11 October 1943 and to Walla Walla AAFd Washington on 4 November 1943.

Ground unit left for Camp Shanks New York on 23 December 1943 and sailed on the Queen Elizabeth on 2 January 1944, and arrived in Clyde on 8 January 1944. The air echelon began overseas movement in early December 1943 via the southern ferry route. Most of the aircraft reached England a few days before the ground units arrived. The 452d was assigned to the 45th Combat Bombardment Wing, and the group tail code was a "Square-L".

the 452d entered combat on 5 February with an attack against aircraft assembly plants at Brunswick. Throughout combat, engaged primarily in bombardment of strategic targets, including marshalling yards at Frankfurt, aircraft assembly plants at Regensburg, aircraft component works at Kassel, the ball-bearing industry at Schweinfurt, a synthetic rubber plant at Hanover, and oil installations at Bohlen.

In addition to strategic missions, the 452d supported ground forces and carried out interdictory operations. Helped prepare for the invasion of Normandy by hitting airfields, V-weapon sites, bridges, and other objectives in France. The group struck coastal defenses on D-Day, 6 June 1944. Bombed enemy positions in support of the breakthrough at Saint-Lô in July and the offensive against Brest in August and September 1944. Later in September, assisted the airborne attack on the Netherlands. Hit enemy communications in and near the combat zone during the Battle of the Bulge, December 1944 – January 1945. Bombed an airfield in support of the airborne assault across the Rhine in March 1945.

The group received a Distinguished Unit Citation for action on 7 April 1945 when, despite vigorous fighter attacks and heavy flak, it accurately bombed a jet-fighter base at Kaltenkirchen. The 452d Bomb Group flew its last combat mission of World War II [in Europe] on 21 April, striking marshalling yards at Ingolstadt.

The group flew a total of 250 missions from Deopham Green during the war, losing 110 of its bombers in the course of these operations. Indeed, the group suffered particularly heavy losses during the spring of 1944, at that time sustaining one of the highest rates of loss of any Fortress equipped unit in the Eighth Air Force.

Redeployed to the US June/August 1945. The air echelon departed the United Kingdom late June 1945. Ground echelon sailed on the Queen Elizabeth from Greenock on 5 August 1945, and arrived in New York on 11 August 1945. The unit established at Sioux Falls AAFd, South Dakota where the Group was inactivated on 28 August 1945.

=== Cold War ===
Redesignated 452 Bombardment Group, Very Heavy on 11 March 1947. Activated in the reserve on 19 April 1947. Redesignated 452 Bombardment Group, Light on 27 June 1949. Trained as a bombardment group under supervision of the 2347th Air Force Reserve Training Center. Ordered to active duty effective 10 August 1950 for duty in the Korean War under the 5th Air Force. Moved to Japan, October–November 1950, and entered combat with Douglas B-26 Invader light bombers against communist forces late in Oct, operating first from bases in Japan and later from South Korea. Flew armed reconnaissance, intruder, and interdiction missions, and provided support for ground troops. Bombed and strafed buildings, tunnels, rail lines, switching centers, bridges, vehicles, supply dumps, and airfields until May 1952 when its mission was taken over by the regular USAF 17th Bombardment Group. The group received two Distinguished Unit Citations for its actions during the Korean War.

Returned to the United States and placed back in reserve status. The unit was remanned and trained as a tactical reconnaissance group, (452 Tactical Reconnaissance Group) 1952–1955; as a tactical bombardment group (452 Bombardment Group, Tactical), 1955–1957; and as a troop carrier group, (452 Troop Carrier Group, Medium) 1957–1959.

=== Reactivation ===
On 1 August 1992, the 452d Operations Group was activated as a result of the 452d Refueling Wing implementing the USAF objective wing organization. Upon activation, the 452 OG was bestowed the lineage and history of the 452 Air Refueling Group and all predecessor organizations. the 452 OG was assigned the flying squadrons of the 452d Refueling Wing.

In 1993, March Air Force Base was selected for realignment. As part of the Air Force's realignment the 452d ARW became the 452d Air Mobility Wing on 1 April 1994. On 1 April 1996, March officially became March Air Reserve Base. In 2005, the Group retired its C-141 fleet. A year later, the wing began to receive its eight C-17s.

== Lineage ==
- Established as the 452 Bombardment Group (Heavy) on 14 May 1943

Activated on 1 June 1943
Redesignated 452 Bombardment Group, Heavy on 20 August 1943
Inactivated on 28 August 1945

- Redesignated 452 Bombardment Group, Very Heavy on 11 March 1947

Activated on 19 April 1947
Redesignated 452 Bombardment Group, Light on 27 June 1949
Ordered to Active Duty on 10 August 1950
Inactivated on 10 May 1952

- Redesignated 452 Tactical Reconnaissance Group on 6 June 1952

Activated in the reserve on 13 June 1952
Redesignated: 452 Bombardment Group, Tactical on 22 May 1955
Redesignated: 452 Troop Carrier Group, Medium on 1 July 1957
Inactivated on 14 April 1959

- Redesignated: 452 Air Refueling Group, Heavy on 31 July 1985 (Remained inactive)
- Redesignated: 452 Operations Group on 1 August 1992 and activated

=== Assignments ===
- II Bomber Command, 1 June 1943
- Second Air Force, 6 October 1943
- Eighth Air Force, c. 8 January 1944
- VIII Bomber Command, January 1944
- 3d Bombardment Division, January 1944
- 45th Combat Bombardment Wing, January 1944
- 20th Bombardment Wing, 18 June 1945
- Second Air Force, c. 12–18 August 1945
- 304th Bombardment Wing (later 304th Air Division), 19 April 1947
- 452d Bombardment Wing, 27 June 1949 – 10 May 1952
- 452d Tactical Reconnaissance Wing (later 452 Bombardment Wing, 452 Troop Carrier Wing), 13 June 1952 – 14 April 1959
- 452d Air Refueling Wing (later 452 Air Mobility) Wing), 1 August 1992 – present

=== Components ===
- 79th Air Refueling Squadron: 1 August 1992 – 1 April 1995
- 336th Air Refueling Squadron: 1 August 1992 – present
- 703d Bombardment Squadron: 28 May 1948 – 27 June 1949
- 728th Bombardment Squadron (later 728th Tactical Reconnaissance Squadron, 728th Bombardment Squadron, 728th Troop Carrier Squadrom): 1 June 1943 – 28 August 1945; 19 April 1947 – 10 May 1952; 13 June 1952 – 14 April 1959
- 729th Bombardment Squadron (later 729th Tactical Reconnaissance Squadron, 729th Bombardment Squadron, 729th Troop Carrier Squadron, 729th Airlift Squadron): 1 June 1943 – 28 August 1945; 12 July 1947 – 10 May 1952; 13 June 1952 – 14 April 1959; 1 May 1994–present
- 730th Bombardment Squadron (later 730th Tactical Reconnaissance Squadron, 730th Bombardment Squadron, 730th Troop Carrier Squadron. 730th Airlift Squadron): 1 June 1943 – 28 August 1945; 1 August 1947 – 10 May 1952; 13 June 1952 – 14 April 1959; 1 May 1994 – 1 April 2005
- 731st Bombardment Squadron: 1 June 1943 – 28 August 1945; 12 July 1947 – 25 June 1951 (detached November 1950-25 June 1951).
- 733d Bombardment Squadron: 16 November 1957 – 14 April 1959

=== Stations ===
- Geiger Field, Washington, 1 June 1943
- Rapid City Army Air Base, South Dakota, c. 13 June 1943
- Pendleton Field, Oregon, 10 October 1943
- Walla Walla Army Air Base, Washington, c. 4 November–December 1943
- RAF Deopham Green (USAAF Station 142), England, c. 8 January 1944 – 6 August 1945
- Sioux Falls Army Air Field, South Dakota, c. 12–28 August 1945
- Long Beach Army Air Field (later Long Beach Municipal Airport), California, 19 April 1947
- George Air Force Base, California, 10 August–October 1950
- Itazuke Air Base, Japan, 26 October 1950
- Miho Air Base, Japan, c. 10 December 1950
- Pusan East (K-9) Air Base, South Korea, 17 May 1951 – 10 May 1952
- Long Beach Airport, California, 13 June 1952 – 14 April 1959
- March Air Force Base (later March Air Reserve Base), California, 1 August 1992 – present

=== Aircraft ===
- Boeing B-17 Flying Fortress, 1943–1945
- Beechcraft C-45 Expeditor, c. 1948–1949, 1953–1955, 1957–1958
- Douglas C-47 Skytrain, c. 1948–1949; 1957–1958
- Douglas B/TB/FB-26 Invader, 1948–1957
- North American F/TF-51 Mustang, 1953–1954
- Lockheed F/TF-80 Shooting Star, 1954–1955
- Curtiss C-46 Commando, 1957–1958; 1952–1954
- Fairchild C-119 Flying Boxcar, 1958–1959
- North American TB-25 Mitchell, 1954–1955
- Boeing KC-135 Stratotanker, 1992–present
- McDonnell Douglas KC-10 Extender, 1992–1995
- Lockheed C-141 Starlifter, 1994–2005
- Boeing C-17 Globemaster III, 2006–present
