= 731st Expeditionary Attack Squadron =

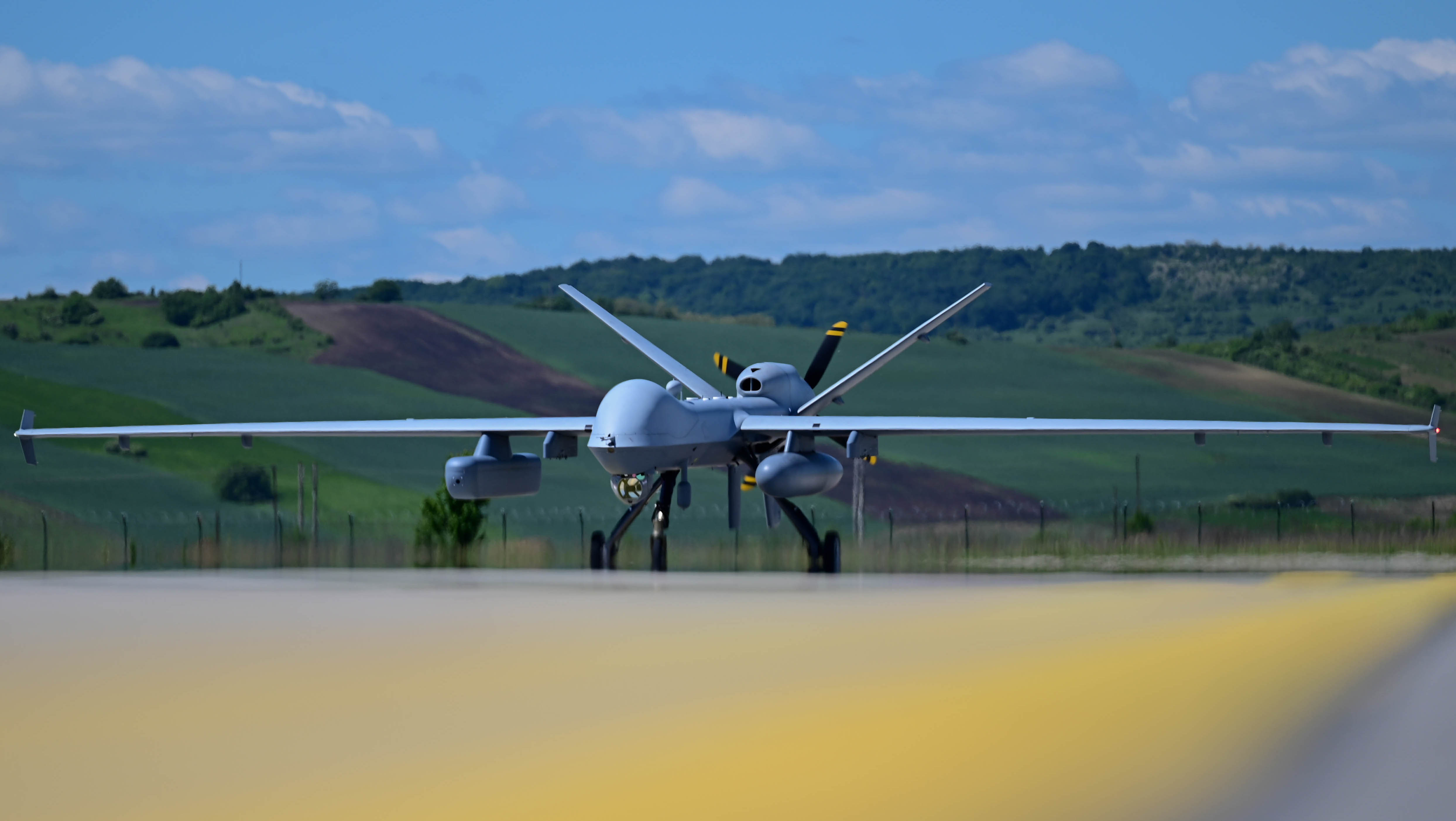
- MQ-9 Reaper of the 731st EATKS returning to Câmpia Turzii after completing a sortie in 2024
- Active: 1943–1945; 1947–1951; 2021 – present
- Country: United States
- Branch: United States Air Force
- Type: Squadron
- Role: Attack; Intelligence, surveillance and reconnaissance
- Part of: 31st Expeditionary Operations Group
- Base: Câmpia Turzii (71st Air Base), Romania

Insignia
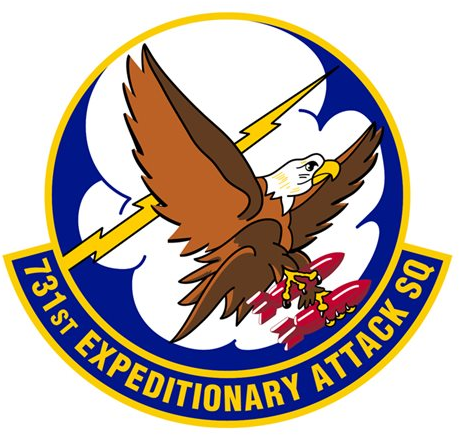
- Squadron emblem
- World War II fuselage code (Note: The squadron did not use this code until the end of the war, although it had been assigned earlier. Instead, the squadron's aircraft only carried the individual aircraft letter, followed by a bar. Freeman, p. 289.): 7D

Aircraft flown
- MQ-9 Reaper

The 731st Expeditionary Attack Squadron is a provisional unit of the United States Air Force. It was activated on 4 March 2021 at the Romanian Air Force 71st Air Base in Câmpia Turzii. The unit is part of the 31st Expeditionary Operations Group and operates General Atomics MQ-9 Reaper unmanned aerial vehicles.

The squadron was first activated in 1943 as the 731st Bombardment Squadron. After training in the United States with the Boeing B-17 Flying Fortress, the squadron deployed to the European Theater of Operations, participating in the strategic bombing campaign against Germany. It earned a Distinguished Unit Citation (DUC) during an attack on a German jet fighter base near Kaltenkirchen in April 1945. Following V-E Day, the squadron returned to the United States and was inactivated.

The squadron was activated again in the reserves in 1947. Two years later, it began to train with Douglas B-26 Invaders. In August 1950, the squadron was one of the first reserve units mobilized for the Korean War. After filling its ranks and undergoing intensive training, the squadron deployed to Far East Air Forces and began flying combat missions. It was awarded two additional DUCs for its operations in Korea. In June 1951, the squadron was inactivated and its personnel and equipment were transferred to a regular unit that was simultaneously activated.

== History ==
=== World War II ===
731 Bomb Squadron B-17G Flying Fortress bombers en route to target (Note: Raid on Châteaudun, France, 28 March 1944. In the foreground is B-17G [7D-M] serial 42-97069, nicknamed "Mon Tete Rouge II".)

The squadron was first activated in June 1943 at Geiger Field, Washington as one of the four original squadrons of the 452d Bombardment Group. Later that month, it moved to Rapid City Army Air Base, South Dakota and began to train with the Boeing B-17 Flying Fortress.

The squadron's emblem was approved on 26 October 1943. It features on a medium blue disc, a large white cloud formation surmounted by a brown and tan falcon in flight, grasping two red aerial bombs in claws, all in front of a yellow lightning flash.

The squadron continued training with Second Air Force until December, when it began its movement to the European Theater of Operations. The ground echelon staged through Camp Shanks and sailed on the RMS Queen Elizabeth on 2 January 1944. The air echelon deployed via the South Atlantic air ferry route.

The squadron established itself at RAF Deopham Green in January 1944, and began operations on 4 February 1944 with a strike on an aircraft assembly plant near Brunswick. Its strategic targets included railroad marshalling yards near Frankfurt, aircraft factories near Regensberg and Kassel. the ball bearing factory at Schweinfurt and an oil refinery near Bohlen. In September 1944, the squadron participated in the third shuttle mission, striking Chemnitz before landing in bases in the Soviet Union.

The 731st was occasionally diverted to support tactical operations. It hit airfields, V-weapon launching sites, bridges and other objectives in preparations for Operation Overlord, the invasion of Normandy. It bombed enemy positions to support Operation Cobra, the breakout at Saint Lo, in July 1944 and the attacks on Brest, France in August. It supported Operation Market Garden, airborne attacks attempting to establish a bridgehead across the Rhine in the Netherlands, in September and, during the Battle of the Bulge, struck German lines of communication. It struck an airfield to support Operation Varsity, the airborne assault across the Rhine in Germany.

Shortly before the end of the war, on 7 April, the squadron struck the jet fighter base at Kaltenkirchen, pressing the attack despite strong fighter opposition, earning a Distinguished Unit Citation. It flew its last mission of the war on 21 April against marshalling yards at Ingolstadt.

After V-E Day, in August 1945, the squadron returned to the United States (the ground echelon once again sailed on the RMS Queen Elizabeth) and was inactivated at Sioux Falls Army Air Field, South Dakota.

=== Reserve duty and Korean War call-up ===
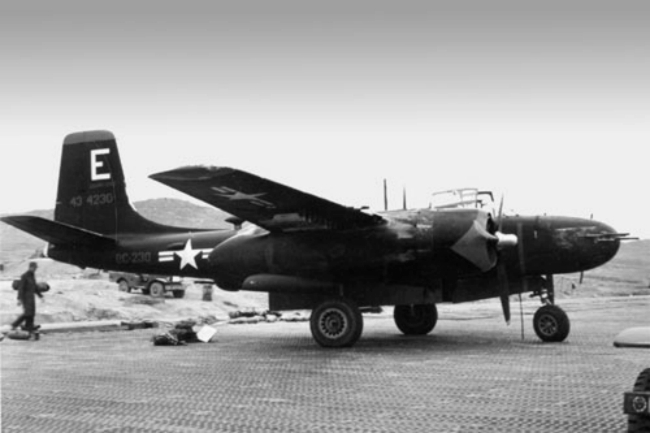
B-26 Invader camouflaged for night operations in Korea

The squadron was reactivated in the reserve at Long Beach Army Air Field, California in 1947 as a very heavy bomber squadron, but conducted proficiency flying with a variety of trainer airplanes under the supervision of the 416th AAF Base Unit (later the 2347th Air Force Reserve Training Center). In a 1949 reorganization of the reserves, it became a light bomber squadron and began to equip and train with Douglas B-26 Invaders. The squadron was manned at only 25% of its authorized strength.

The squadron was mobilized for the Korean War in August 1950 in the first wave of reserve mobilizations. To help bring it up to strength, the squadron was augmented by reservists assigned to the 448th Bombardment Wing, which was also stationed at Long Beach, but remained in reserve status until the following year. The 731st was a squadron of one of the first two reserve wings to be mobilized, (Note: The other was the 437th Troop Carrier Wing.) and administrative provisions for mobilization proved inadequate, with numerous reservists never receiving the telegrams calling them to active duty.

The unit moved to George Air Force Base, California for intensive training and to be brought up to full strength. In October, the squadron deployed to Iwakuni Air Base, Japan to begin combat operations. The Air Force decided that, unlike the three other squadrons of the 452d Group, the 731st would be trained for night intruder operations. Although the squadron remained part of the 452d until inactivated, it was attached to the understrength 3d Bombardment Group upon its arrival in theater. Four of its crews left George in mid-September and participated in combat operations with the 3d Group during October, although the first mission by the squadron was on 24 November. The 731st flew night bombing missions at all altitudes, using both visual and radar techniques. Its Invaders also flew close air support and armed reconnaissance flights. It also flew flare drop missions, operating Douglas C-47 Skytrains. By June 1951, the 731st had flown more than 9,000 hours of combat and 2,000 combat sorties.

The remaining two squadrons assigned to the 3d Bombardment Group had also been put on night operations. In June 1951, the 3d was brought up to strength by the activation of the 90th Bombardment Squadron, and the 731st Squadron was inactivated while its personnel and aircraft transferred to the 90th and other elements of the 3d Group.

=== Reactivation and deployment to Romania ===
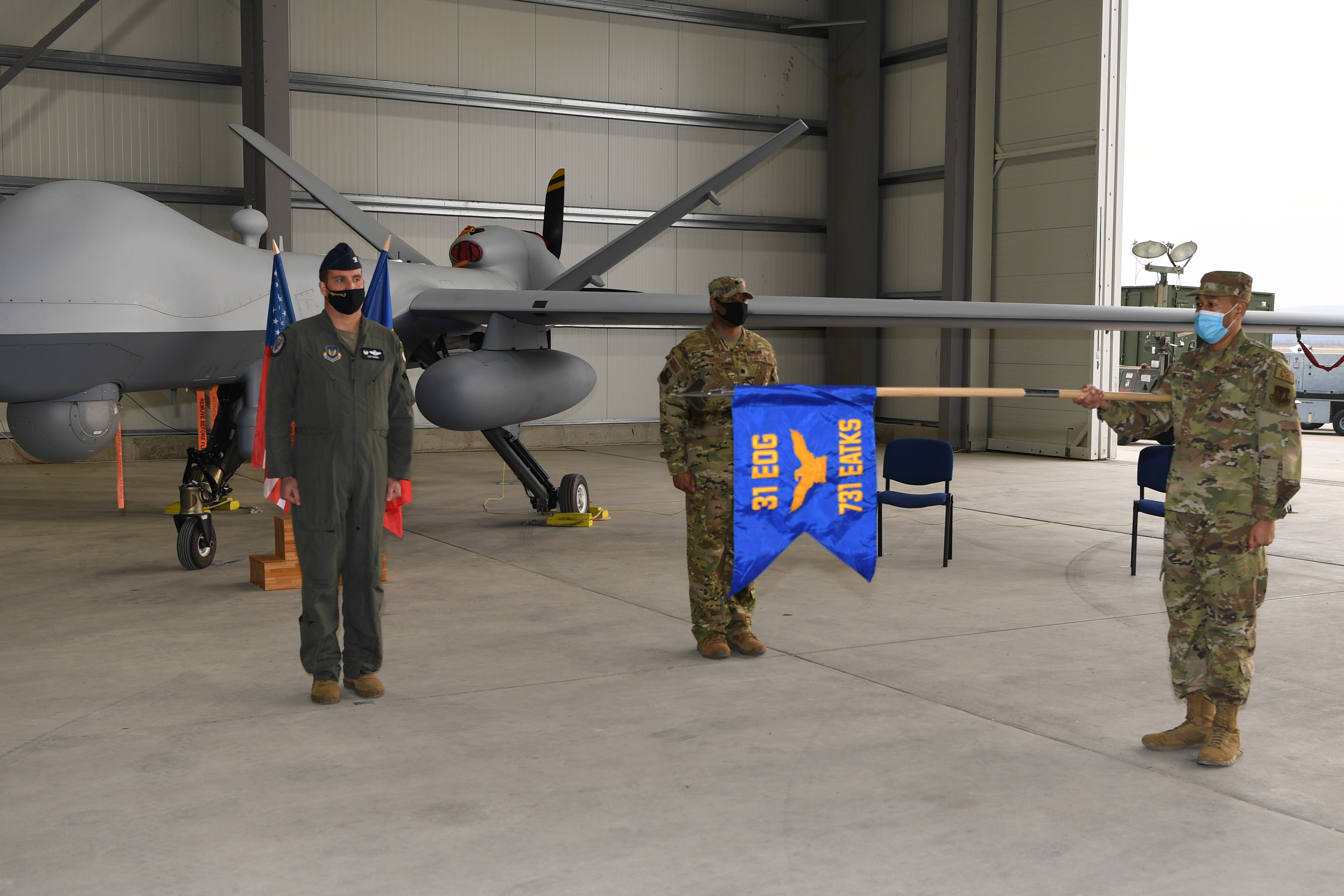
Newly activated 731st Expeditionary Attack Squadron welcomes new commander

In 2021, the US Air Force deployed General Atomics MQ-9 Reaper unmanned aerial vehicles and about 90 airmen to Romania, at the 71st Air Base in Câmpia Turzii. The unit was part of the 31st Expeditionary Operations Group, Detachment 1. Beginning on 1 February, the 25th Attack Group, located at the Shaw Air Force Base, South Carolina began flying sorties via remote-split operations. (Note: Remote split operations, employ a launch-and-recovery ground control station for take-off and landing operations at the forward operating location (in this case operated by the 731st), while the crew based in continental United States (in this case, the 25th Attack Group) executes command and control of the remainder of the mission via beyond-line-of-sight links. Remote split operations result in a smaller number of personnel deployed to a forward location, consolidate control of the different flights in one location, and simplify command and control functions as well as logisticals.)

The unmanned vehicles fly intelligence, surveillance and reconnaissance (ISR), as well as freedom of maneuver missions and integrate with joint and coalition forces in the region. The MQ-9s also participate in exercises that ensure interoperability with allied and partner nations.

About 4 March 2021, the squadron, now designated the 731st Expeditionary Attack Squadron was activated at the base. The squadron also participated in Operation Porcupine 2021, working together with the 510th Fighter Squadron, 56th and 57th Rescue Squadrons, and the 606th Air Control Squadron. The Reapers can be equipped with AGM-114 Hellfire missiles, two external fuel tanks, and a variety of sensor pods.

On 14 July 2022, a squadron MQ-9 crashed in a field south of the base while conducting a routine mission in the region. The accident caused no injuries, or damage to structures.

==== 2023 Black Sea incident ====
On 14 March 2023, an MQ-9 Reaper reportedly took off from a base in Romania on a scheduled reconnaissance mission over the Black Sea. While over international waters, it was intercepted by two Russian Air Force Sukhoi Su-27 Flanker fighters. One of the Flankers damaged the Reaper drone causing it to crash.

== Lineage ==
- Constituted as the 731st Bombardment Squadron (Heavy) on 14 May 1943

Activated on 1 June 1943
Redesignated 731st Bombardment Squadron, Heavy on 20 August 1943
Inactivated on 28 August 1945

- Redesignated 731st Bombardment Squadron, Very Heavy on 13 May 1947

Activated in the reserve on 12 July 1947
Redesignated 731st Bombardment Squadron, Light on 27 June 1949
Redesignated 731st Bombardment Squadron, Light, Night Attack on 1 August 1950
Ordered to active service on 10 August 1950
Inactivated on 25 June 1951

- Redesignated 731st Expeditionary Attack Squadron

Activated 4 March 2021

=== Assignments ===
- 452d Bombardment Group, 1 June 1943 – 28 August 1945
- 452d Bombardment Group, 12 July 1947 – 25 June 1951 (attached to 3d Bombardment Group after November 1950)
- 31st Operations Group, 4 March 2021 – present

=== Stations ===
- Geiger Field, Washington, 1 June 1943
- Rapid City Army Air Base, South Dakota, c. 13 June 1943
- Pendleton Field, Oregon, 10 October 1943
- Walla Walla Army Air Base, Washington, c. 4 November–December 1943
- RAF Deopham Green (AAF-142), England, c. 8 January 1944 – 6 August 1945
- Sioux Falls Army Air Field, South Dakota, c. 12–28 August 1945
- Long Beach Army Air Field (later Long Beach Municipal Airport), California, 19 April 1947
- George Air Force Base, California, 10 August–October 1950
- Iwakuni Air Base, Japan, 17 November 1950 – 25 June 1951
- Câmpia Turzii Air Base, Romania, 4 March 2021 – present

=== Aircraft ===
- Boeing B-17 Flying Fortress, 1943–1945
- Douglas B-26 Invader, 1950–1951 (Note: Although Maurer does not list any operational aircraft assigned to the squadron for the period 1947–1949, Air Force Historical Research Agency Factsheets for the 452d Group and its other three squadrons indicated they operated North American T-6 Texans and two-engine Beechcraft trainers during this period.)
- Douglas C-47 Skytrain, 1951
- General Atomics MQ-9 Reaper, 2021–present

=== Awards and campaigns ===
Award streamer	Award	Dates	Notes
	Distinguished Unit Citation	Germany, 7 April 1945	
	Distinguished Unit Citation	Korea, 22 April 1951 – 25 June 1951	
	Republic of Korea Presidential Unit Citation	Korea, 27 Oct 1950 – 25 June 1951	

Campaign Streamer	Campaign	Dates	Notes
	Air Offensive, Europe	8 January 1944 – 5 June 1944	
	Normandy	6 June 1944 – 24 July 1944	
	Northern France	25 July 1944 – 14 September 1944	
	Rhineland	15 September 1944 – 21 March 1945	
	Ardennes-Alsace	16 December 1944 – 25 January 1945	
	Central Europe	22 March 1944 – 21 May 1945	
	Air Combat, EAME Theater	7 December 1941 – 11 May 1945	
	CCF Intervention	24 November 1950 – 24 January 1951	
	1st UN Counteroffensive	25 January 1951 – 21 April 1951	
	CCF Spring Offensive	22 April 1951 – 25 June 1951	

== See also ==
- B-17 Flying Fortress units of the United States Army Air Forces
- List of A-26 Invader operators
- List of Douglas C-47 Skytrain operators
