= RAF Deopham Green =

Former RAF station in Norfolk, England

RAF Deopham Green USAAF Station 142
- Located Near Attleborough, Norfolk, UK
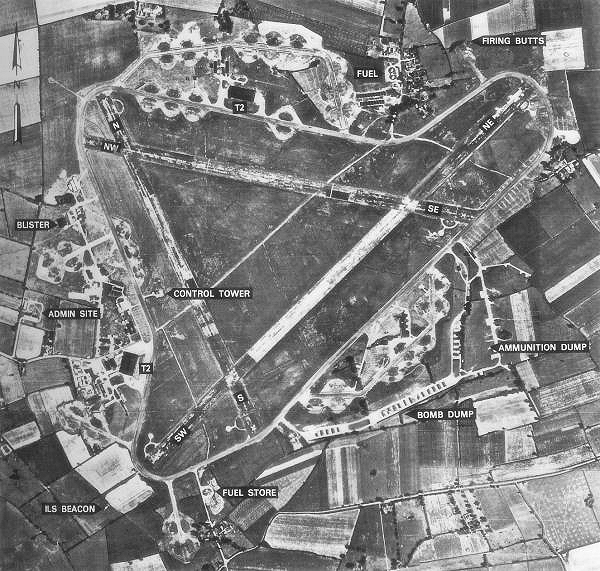
- Aerial Photo of Deopham Green Airfield - 9 July 1946

Site information
- Type: Royal Air Force station
- Code: DG
- Owner: Air Ministry
- Controlled by: Royal Air Force; United States Army Air Forces

Location
- RAF Deopham Green, shown within Norfolk County
- Coordinates: 52°33′5.72″N 000°59′31.22″E

Site history
- Built: 1943
- In use: 1944-1948
- Battles/wars: European Theatre of World War II; Air Offensive, Europe July 1942 - May 1945

Garrison information
- Garrison: Eighth Air Force
- Occupants: 452nd Bombardment Group

Royal Air Force Deopham Green or more simply RAF Deopham Green is a former Royal Air Force station located near Deopham Green 2 miles (3.2 km) north of Attleborough, Norfolk, England.

== United States Army Air Forces use ==
RAF Deopham Green was built in 1942 and 1943 for the USAAF and assigned the designation Station 142.

USAAF Station Units assigned to RAF Deopham Green were:

- 466th Sub-Depot
- 18th Weather Squadron
- 87th Station Complement Squadron
- 1230th Quartermaster Company
- 1284th Military Police Company
- 1797th Ordnance Supply & Maintenance Company
- 872nd Chemical Company (Air Operations)
- 2112th Engineer Fire Fighting Platoon

=== 452nd Bombardment Group (Heavy) ===
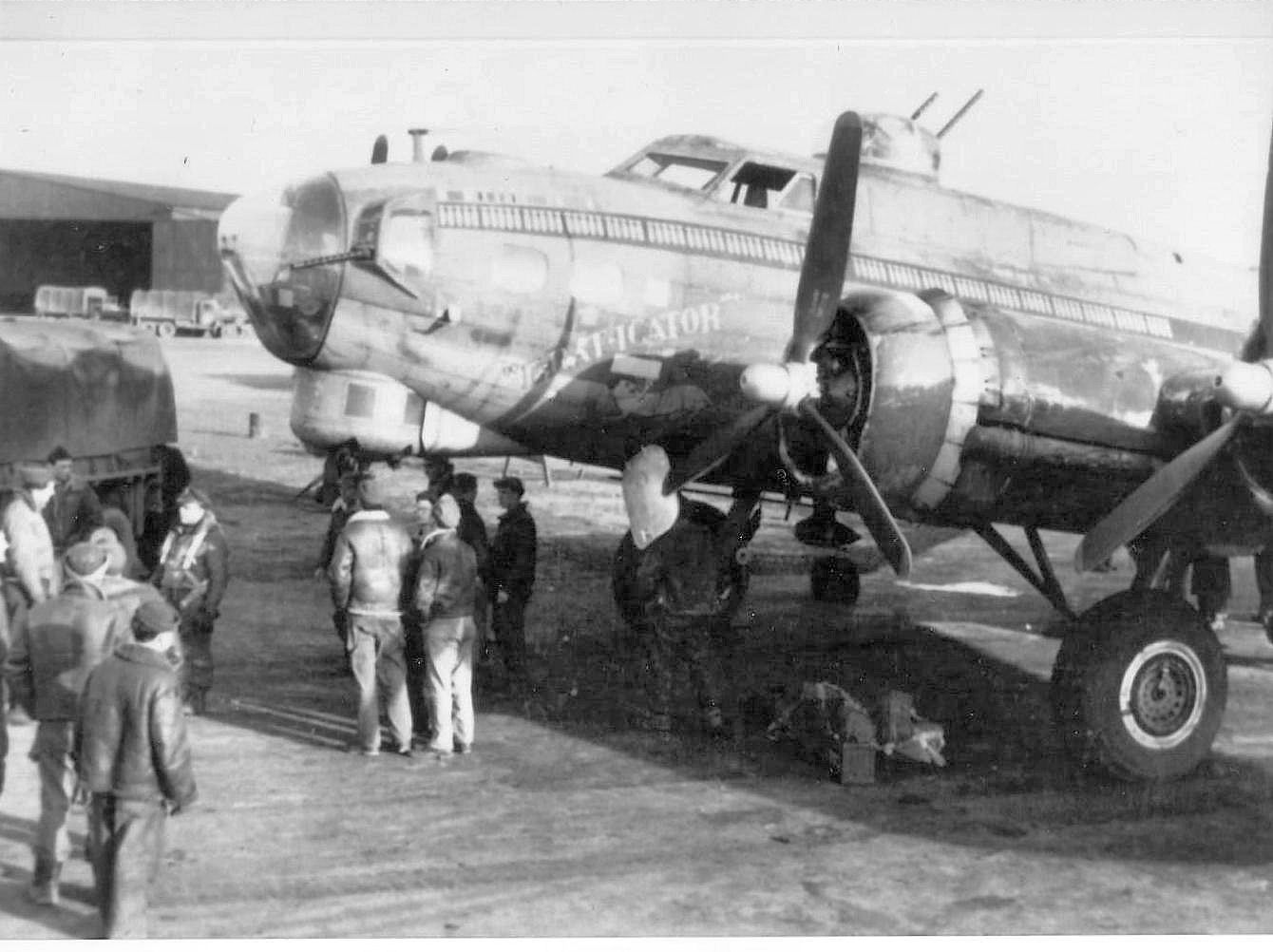
B-17G-10-VE #42-39970 "E-Rat-Icator" Code: P 452nd Bomb Group - 730th Bomb Squadron Photo taken upon return from her 100th mission. She survived the war.

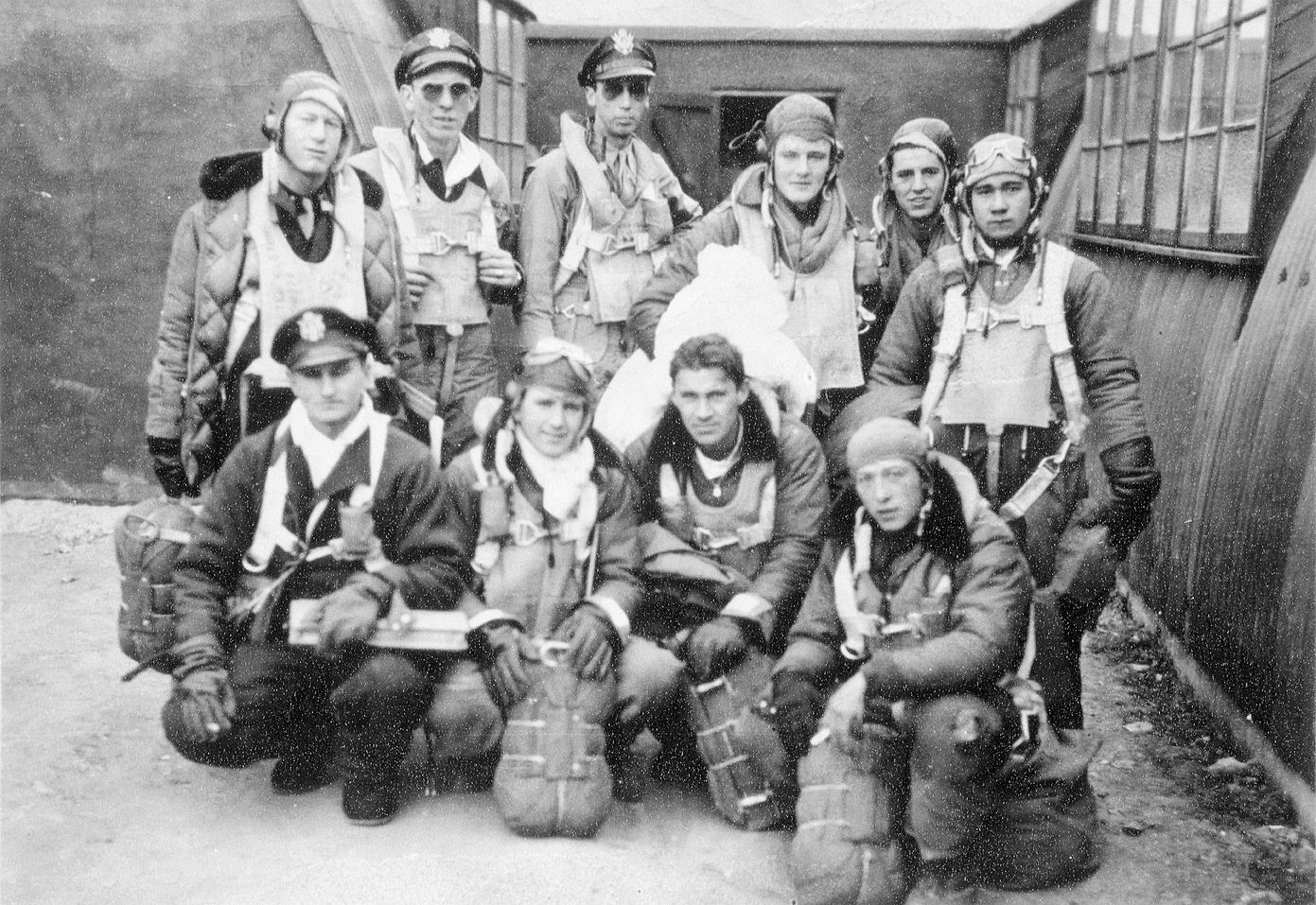
A bomber crew of the 452nd Bomb Group on their return from the Romilly mission to France.

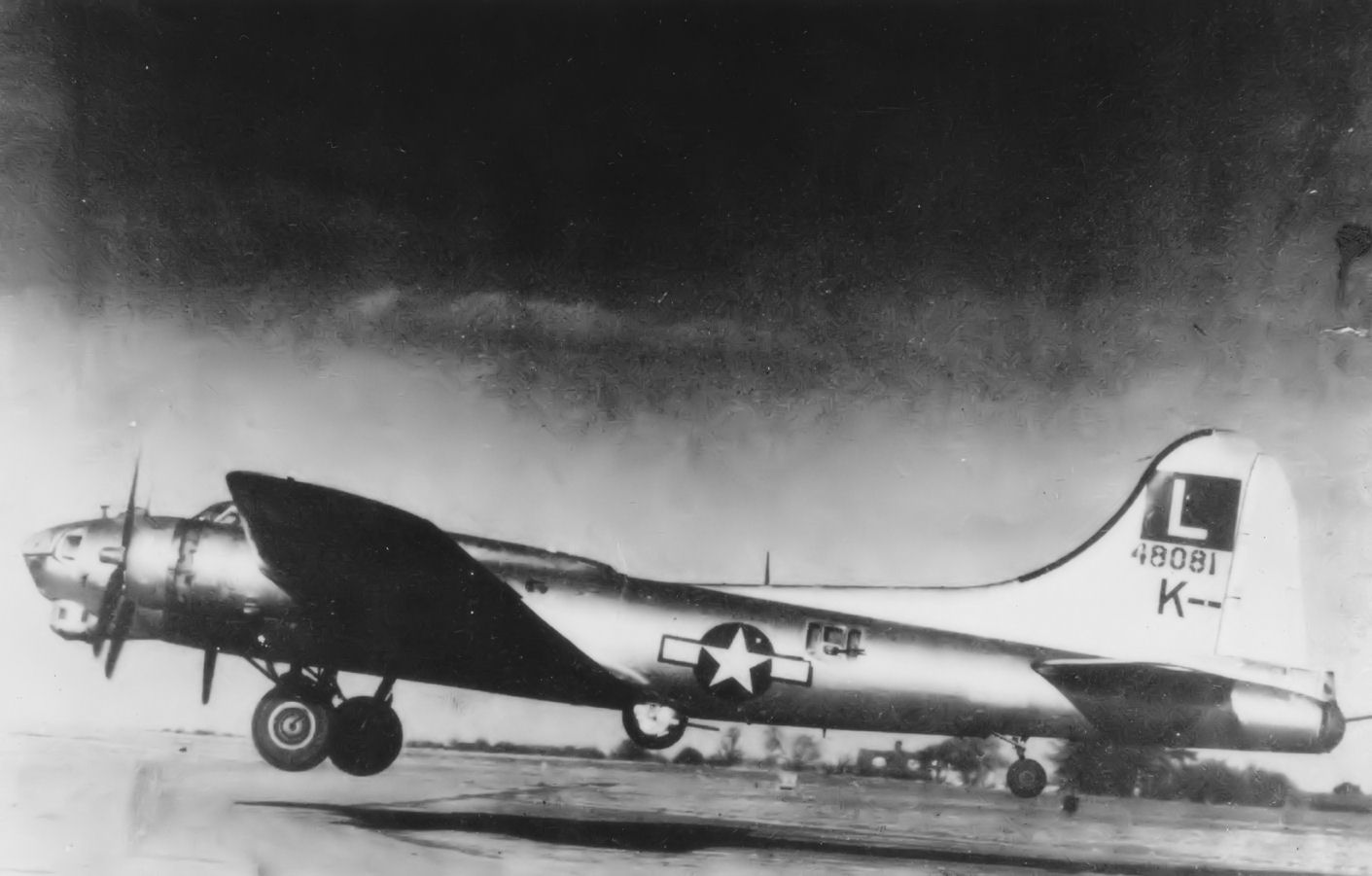
A B-17 Flying Fortress ('K', serial number 44-8081) of the 452nd Bomb Group just after taking off from Deopham Green airfield.

The airfield was opened on 3 January 1944 and was used by the United States Army Air Forces Eighth Air Force 452d Bombardment Group (Heavy), which arrived at Deopham Green from Walla Walla AAF Washington. The 452nd was assigned to the 45th Combat Bombardment Wing, and the group tail code was a "Square-L". Its operational squadrons were:

- 728th Bombardment Squadron (9Z)
- 729th Bombardment Squadron (M3)
- 730th Bombardment Squadron (6K)
- 731st Bombardment Squadron (7D)

The group flew Boeing B-17 Flying Fortresses as part of the Eighth Air Force's strategic bombing campaign.

The 452nd BG entered combat on 5 February 1944 with an attack against aircraft assembly plants at Brunswick. It was engaged primarily in bombardment of strategic targets, including the marshalling yards at Frankfurt, aircraft assembly plants at Regensburg, aircraft component works at Kassel, the ball-bearing industry at Schweinfurt, a synthetic rubber plant at Hanover, and oil installations at Bohlen.

First Lieutenant Donald Gott and Second Lieutenant William E Metzger Jr were each awarded the Medal of Honor posthumously for remaining with their aircraft crippled during a mission over Germany on 9 November 1944. Lieutenant Gott was at the controls of a B-17 when it was hit by anti-aircraft fire, three engines being immobilised, a fire starting in the cockpit and with the radio operator and engineer being seriously wounded. Although faced with the imminent explosion of his bomb-laden aircraft, Lieutenant Gott, after conferring with his co-pilot, Lieutenant Metzger, decided to continue to the target.

Then, after dropping their bombs, Lieutenant Gott made for the Allied lines to attempt to put the crippled Fortress down to save the life of the radio operator who had by now lost consciousness. Although ordered to bail out with the rest of the crew, the co-pilot chose to remain with Lieutenant Gott but, as he prepared to let down into a field the B-17 exploded killing all three crew members.

In addition to strategic missions, the 452nd supported ground forces and carried out interdictory operations. They helped prepare for the invasion of Normandy by hitting airfields, V-weapon sites, bridges, and other objectives in France. The group struck coastal defenses on D-Day 6 June 1944, and bombed enemy positions in support of the breakthrough at Saint-Lô in July and the offensive against Brest in August and September 1944. Later in September, it assisted the Operation Market-Garden (the airborne attack on the Netherlands), hit enemy communications in and near the combat zone during the Battle of the Bulge, December 1944 - January 1945, and bombed an airfield in support of the airborne assault across the Rhine in March 1945.

The group received a Distinguished Unit Citation for action on 7 April 1945 when, despite vigorous fighter attacks and heavy flak, it accurately bombed a jet-fighter airfield at Kaltenkirchen. The 452nd Bomb Group flew its last combat mission of World War II [in Europe] on 21 April 1945, striking marshalling yards at Ingolstadt.

The group flew a total of 250 missions from Deopham Green during the war, losing 110 of its bombers in the course of these operations. Indeed, the group suffered particularly heavy losses during the spring of 1944, at that time sustaining one of the highest rates of loss of any Fortress equipped unit in the Eighth Air Force. The 452nd returned to the United States, being inactivated at Sioux Falls AAF South Dakota on 28 August 1945.

== Postwar use ==
After the war, the station was handed back to RAF Maintenance Command on 9 October 1945. The unit was No. 258 Maintenance Unit RAF. Public roads, closed when construction started in 1942, were later re-opened, one of them using part of the old main runway, the airfield finally being closed on 1 January 1948.

Unfortunately over the years most of the buildings have been torn down and the airfield has been returned to agricultural use. However many of the runways and taxiways of the old airfield remain, albeit at a reduced width. There is a memorial on the side of the road running through the site, another outside Hingham Church and another at Attleborough railway station.

== See also ==
- List of former Royal Air Force stations
