= Air Reserve Technician Program =

Air Reserve Technicians, commonly referred to as ARTs, are a group of full-time uniformed U.S. Air Force leaders, managers, operators, planners and trainers in what is known as the Air Reserve Component (ARC) of the United States Air Force, the ARC consisting of both the Air Force Reserve and the Air National Guard.

== Background ==
With most having extensive prior active duty experience in the Regular Air Force, ARTs have expert knowledge and proven expertise to maintain the operational combat readiness of Air Force Reserve Command (AFRC) and Air National Guard (ANG) units and to smooth the transition of Air Reserve Component units and both their full-time and traditional part-time military personnel from a peacetime environment to a contingency or wartime environment. They also provide leadership and management continuity, equipment maintenance, administrative support, and training support to help keep their units combat ready.

Air Reserve Technicians carry a dual status, working as both full-time Department of the Air Force civil service (DAFC) employees and as uniformed Reserve Component USAF military members in the same AFRC or ANG units where they work as civil servants, performing the same job function whether in a DAFC or a military status. ARTs are unique among DoD civil servants in that all commissioned officers and all enlisted personnel are required to wear their uniforms and utilize their rank titles at all times, whether in a DAFC civil service, regular drill, additional drill, or active duty status. The full-time use of military titles by ART personnel is intended to eliminate confusion, especially in interaction with Active Component personnel and particularly in the cases of those AFRC and ANG units located on Active Component air force bases, space force bases, naval air stations, army air fields, or joint bases.

In their technically "civil service" role, Air Reserve Technicians are physically located at their AFRC or ANG unit and provide full-time day-to-day support for their units throughout the year, be it at the squadron, group, wing, numbered air force (NAF) or major command (MAJCOM) level. Because uniformed military reserve status is a pre-condition of their employment as DAFC civil servants, ARTs, specifically senior officers and senior enlisted, are typically exempt from the mandatory retirement dates for their military pay grades and are retained in uniform until reaching civil service retirement eligibility, notionally at age 60.

It is this dual military and civil service status that differentiates ARTs from their full-time counterparts in the Navy Reserve and Marine Corps Reserve, especially those in their services' respective military aviation organizations, the Naval Air Reserve and the Marine Air Reserve, who perform functionally similar roles with similar flying units that are typically "combat coded" for a combat flying mission.

Training and Administration of the Reserve (TAR) personnel (known as from Full Time Support (FTS) personnel 2005 to 2021) in the Navy, and Active Reserve (AR) personnel in the Marine Corps, while technically members of their respective Reserve Components, are actually full-time active duty career personnel assigned to the Reserve Components of their respective services. In this sense, they are very similar to the Active Guard and Reserve (AGR) Air Force personnel also assigned to AFRC and ANG units, although the Navy Reserve TAR and Marine Corps AR personnel operate in a continuous active duty track with associated permanent change of station (PCS) reassignments similar to, but somewhat distinctive from, their Regular Navy and Regular Marine Corps counterparts.

NOTE: The U.S. Army also has a Military Technician (MILTECH) program nearly identical to the USAF ART program, as well as AGRs, in both the Army Reserve and the Army National Guard, with many assigned to Army Aviation units. Just as ARTs are DAFCs with a mandatory dual status in uniform full-time, MILTECHs are Department of the Army Civilians (DAC) with a mandatory full-time status in uniform.

NOTE: While it has a traditional "part time" Coast Guard Reserve, the U.S. Coast Guard has no "full time" reserve programs analogous to ART or AGR. Management of Coast Guard Reserve personnel is managed by active duty Regular Coast Guard personnel.

NOTE: As of June 2022, there is no designated Reserve Component for the U.S. Space Force. Air Force Reserve Command and Air National Guard space operations and space support units remain U.S. Air Force organizations within the Air Reserve Component.

== Assignment and Utilization ==
Air Reserve Technicians participate with both AGR personnel and other Traditional Reservists (TR) in AFRC units and Traditional Guardsmen (TG), also known as Drill Status Guardsmen (DSG) in ANG units during weekend unit training assemblies (UTAs), additional weekday or weekend drills (to include Additional Flying Training Periods, or AFTPs, for aeronautically rated officers and enlisted aircrew), annual training (AT) active duty tours, and additional active duty tours for training, operational support or special work (ADT / ADOS / ADSW), the latter also referred to as "man days" for duty in both the Continental United States (CONUS) and outside the Continental United States (OCONUS).

ART personnel are also subject to mobilization/recall to full active duty with the Regular Air Force pursuant to Title 10 U.S.C 12301 and 12302 and subsequent assignment to Regular Air Force or joint U.S. military organizations. In this instance, they may be "mobilized" as individuals and assigned to other units, or as part of their parent AFRC or ANG unit being "mobilized" (to include "federalized" for ANG) all or in part for duty in CONUS and/or OCONUS, to include designated combat zones as part of Air and Space Expeditionary Forces (AEF).

ART personnel are predominantly assigned to operational AFRC and ANG flying units at the wing, group and squadron level, with a lesser number assigned to MAJCOMs, NAFs, non-flying units and staffs. Their jobs span a broad spectrum within these organizations, including commander at the squadron, group and wing level, as well as various other Air Force Specialty Codes (AFSCs).

For commissioned officers, these AFSCs include, but are not limited to, Pilots, Navigators/Combat Systems Officers, and Air Battle Managers in nearly every USAF Mission Design Series (MDS) aircraft, to include flight instructors, tactics instructors and standardization/evaluators in those aircraft. Other roles include space operations officers, Combat Rescue Officers (CROs), Aircraft Maintenance Officers (MXOs), Civil Engineering (CE) Officers, Intelligence Officers, Security Forces officers, Logistics Readiness Officers (LROs), nurses (including flight nurses), meteorologists, and administrative, personnel and other force support officers.

Enlisted ARTs are composed of enlisted aircrew positions such as flight engineer, loadmaster, pararescueman, air refueling boom operator, airborne operations/battle management systems technician, aerial gunner, flight attendant, and aerial photographer as well as non-flying enlisted positions such as aircraft maintenance technician, avionics maintenance technician, air traffic controller, fire fighter, Security Forces, airfield operations, civil engineering, communications, command post, logistics, medical technician, dental technician, and administrative personnel. ARTs comprise approximately 17 percent of total AFRC and ANG unit manpower, with aircraft and avionics maintenance employing roughly 60 percent of the enlisted ART work force, where they average 17 years of job experience. Security Forces personnel also comprise a significant number of the enlisted ART force.

== Basis ==
The ART program was first implemented in 1958 as the result of an Air Force study which showed that Air Force Reservists and Air National Guardsmen could be trained, and their operational readiness maintained, by fewer full-time Air Reserve Technicians than by a larger number of full-time active duty Regular Air Force personnel. The Air Reserve Technician program saved the Air Force US$13 million in 1958 dollars ($132.8 million in 2022 dollars) during its first year of operation.

As of 2012, Air Reserve Technicians comprised over 10,500 of all personnel assigned in the Air Force Reserve Command, or approximately 15% of total AFRC manning. ART manpower in the Air National Guard comprised a slightly higher percentage, numbering approximately 18,000 personnel or +/- 17% of total Air National Guard personnel strength in all 50 states, Puerto Rico, Guam, the Virgin Islands and the District of Columbia.

== Sources ==
This article contains information that originally came from a US Government website, in the public domain.
