= Walla Walla Regional Airport =

Walla Walla Regional Airport Walla Walla Army Air Base
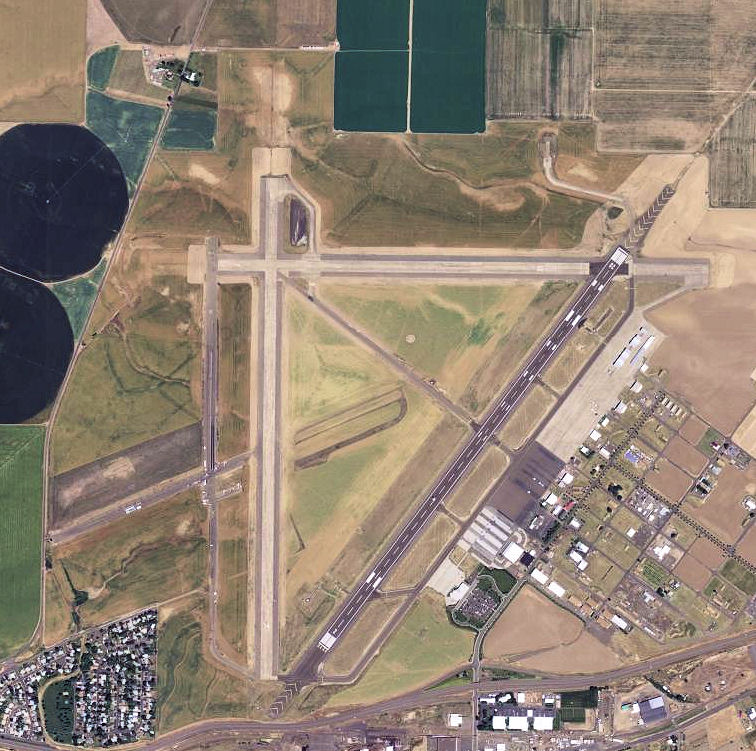
- 2006 USGS Orthophoto
- IATA: ALW; ICAO: KALW; FAA LID: ALW

Summary
- Airport type: Public
- Owner: Port of Walla Walla
- Serves: Walla Walla, Washington
- Location: Walla Walla County, Washington, U.S.
- Elevation AMSL: 1,194 ft (364 m)
- Coordinates: 46.09°N 118.29°W

Map
- Location of airport in Washington ALW (the United States)

Runways
| Direction | Length | | Surface |
| Direction | ft | m | Surface |
|---|---|---|---|
| 2/20 | 6,527 | 1,989 | Concrete/Grooved |

Statistics (2024)
- Aircraft operations: 37,260
- Based aircraft: 118
- Source: Federal Aviation Administration

Walla Walla Regional Airport (IATA: ALW, ICAO: KALW, FAA LID: ALW) is a public airport in Walla Walla County, Washington, in the western United States. It is three miles (5 km) northeast of central Walla Walla, and is owned by the Port of Walla Walla.

== History ==
=== World War II ===
The airport was the location of the U.S. Army Air Forces' Walla Walla Army Air Base in World War II.

The War Department announced it would be spending more than $7.5 million to construct an Army Air Corps training airfield adjacent to the existing airfield at Walla Walla. With the old 200-acre (0.8 km^{2}) municipal airport as a nucleus, it commenced development of the Walla Walla Army Air Base, which ultimately comprised 2,164 acres (8.8 km^{2}) of land. Over 300 buildings were constructed and equipped to house, feed, and train approximately 6,000 personnel. Many of the wartime bomber hangars are still in use as of 2023.

The 91st Bomb Group was the first Army Air Forces outfit to utilize the Walla Walla base. The 91st had initially trained in Florida, and upon arrival trained in B-17 Flying Fortress four-engine bombers. The 91st went on to distinguish itself in combat over Europe. Several of these crews made outstanding records during their tour of duty and were well publicized upon their return to the United States, with names such as Delta Rebel, Jack the Ripper, and Memphis Belle, the first B-17 to complete 25 missions in Europe.

Late in 1943, the airfield lay idle when the Second Air Force withdrew its B-17 training operation. In April 1944, the Fourth Air Force took charge and established a training base for B-24 Liberator bomber crews.

During the war years, it is estimated that more than 8,000 officers and men were trained at this base producing 594 heavy bomber crews who compiled about 114,514 hours in the air while in training. One of its aircraft, a B-24, crashed in September 1944 at the future site of the Mission Ridge ski area near Wenatchee, killing all six aboard; a wing section from the B-24 is mounted above its "Bomber Bowl."

=== Post-war ===
In 1947, the newly formed U.S. Air Force declared the airfield as surplus and the city and county took over operations on December 1. A board was formed to manage the airport and the complexities of the facilities transfer. After considerably less than the standard two-year probationary period, the airport board received an approved Civil Aeronautics Authority's full and complete title to the $13 million airport on April 10, 1949. This was the first joint ownership (city/county) permitted in the entire nation.

Beginning in 1965, the airport was a USAF dispersal base for Convair F-102 Delta Dagger and later F-106 Delta Dart fighter-interceptors of Air Defense Command, manned by the 325th Fighter Wing of McChord AFB, near Tacoma. Walla Walla was previously part of the 337th Fighter Group of Portland, Oregon. Although the interceptor detachment left the airport in the early 1970s, the large grey metal alert hangars used by the interceptors are still present at the north end of the airport ramp, and are used as general aviation hangars.

In 1989, the Port of Walla Walla took over ownership and operational responsibility of the airport from the city and county of Walla Walla. The airport is mostly used for general aviation but is also served by one commercial airline.

Since 1997, the former office and supply buildings surrounding the airport proper have been converted for use by industrial/manufacturing businesses, including several wineries that source their fruit locally.

The Port of Walla Walla announced plans in 2022 to remodel its passenger terminal in preparation for the use of Embraer 175 jets by Alaska Airlines, who were phasing out their Bombardier Q400 turboprop fleet. The improvements will include a larger boarding area, remodeled offices, and glass walls mandated by the Transportation Security Administration.

== Facilities and aircraft ==
Walla Walla Regional Airport covers an area of 3,000 acres (12 km^{2}) which includes one concrete/grooved runway: 2/20 measuring 6,527 by 150 feet (1,989 m × 46 m). There is a VOR on the field that operates on 116.4 MHz.

For the 12-month period ending December 31, 2021, the airport had 46,464 aircraft operations, an average of 127 per day: 93% general aviation, 4% air taxi, 2% scheduled commercial and <1% military. At that time there were 118 aircraft based at this airport: 106 single-engine, 6 multi-engine, 2 jet, 1 helicopter, 2 ultralight and 1 glider. Walla Walla Regional Airport has 19 scheduled commercial roundtrip flights to Seattle each week.

Walla Walla University and Gorge Aviation Services operate flight schools on the field, from primary training through multi-engine, commercial, and other training.

== Airlines and destinations ==
=== Passenger ===
| Airlines | Destinations |
|---|---|
| Alaska Airlines | Seattle/Tacoma |

Destinations map
Destinations from Walla Walla Regional Airport

=== Cargo ===
| Airlines | Destinations |
|---|---|
| Ameriflight | Tri-Cities (WA), Seattle–Boeing, Spokane, Yakima |

=== Top destinations ===
Busiest domestic routes out of ALW (January 2024 - December 2024)
| Rank | City | Passengers | Carriers |
|---|---|---|---|
| 1 | Seattle/Tacoma, WA | 36,740 | Alaska |

=== Historical airline service ===
Walla Walla had scheduled passenger jet service in the past provided by West Coast Airlines, which operated Douglas DC-9-14 jetliners, and also by Cascade Airways, which flew British Aircraft Corporation BAC One-Eleven twinjets. Both airlines also operated turboprop aircraft into the airport as well. West Coast flew Fairchild F-27 propjets while Cascade operated Hawker Siddeley HS 748, Beechcraft 1900C and Fairchild Swearingen Metroliner turboprops. In addition, Cascade had its major maintenance base located at the airport for all of the aircraft types it operated including the BAC One-Eleven jets.

West Coast then merged with Bonanza Air Lines and Pacific Air Lines to form Air West, which was subsequently renamed Hughes Airwest. Both Air West and Hughes Airwest continued to serve Walla Walla with Fairchild F-27 propjet flights, although by 1975 Hughes Airwest had turned over all of its service to Cascade Airways.

Horizon Air and Skywest Airlines operate Embraer E175 regional jets into Walla Walla on behalf of Alaska Airlines.

== See also ==
- List of airports in Washington
- Washington World War II Army Airfields
