= Böhlen =

- Town
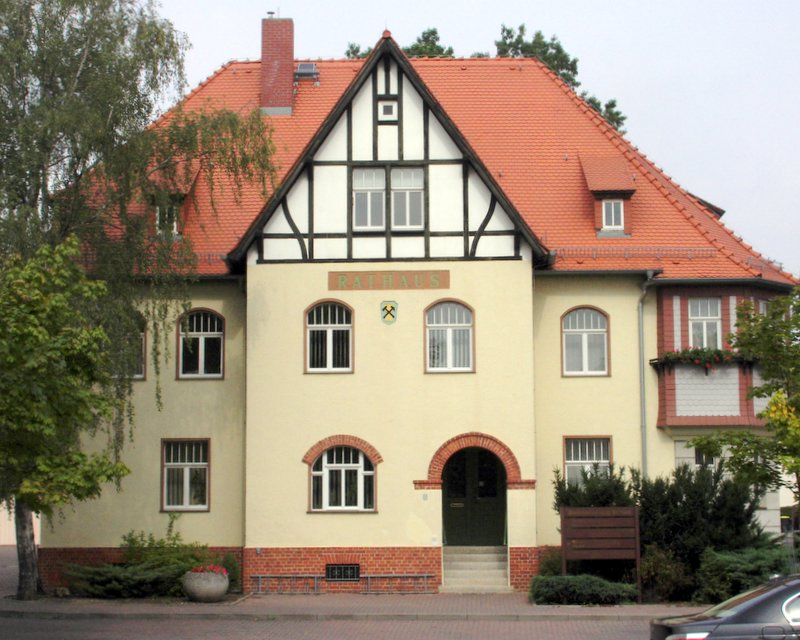

- Coat of arms

- Location of Böhlen within Leipzig district
- Interactive map of Böhlen
- Location within Germany Location within Saxony
- Coordinates: 51°12′9″N 12°23′9″E
- Country: Germany
- State: Saxony
- District: Leipzig
- Subdivisions: 2

Government
  - Mayor (2022–29): Dietmar Berndt

Area
  - Total: 24.56 km^{2} (9.48 sq mi)
- Elevation: 126 m (413 ft)

Population (2025-12-31)
  - Total: 6,796
  - Density: 276.7/km^{2} (716.7/sq mi)
- Time zone: UTC+01:00 (CET)
  - Summer (DST): UTC+02:00 (CEST)
- Postal codes: 04564
- Dialling codes: 034206, 034299 (Großdeuben)
- Vehicle registration: L, BNA, GHA, GRM, MTL, WUR
- Website: www.stadt-boehlen.de

Böhlen (German pronunciation: [ˈbøːlən]) is a town in Saxony, Germany, south of Leipzig. Its main features are a small airport and a power plant. It is located in the newly built Neuseenland, the lakes created in former open-pit mining areas.

== History ==
The first documented mention of Böhlen dates to 1353, although the area has been settled since the 7th century. The name of the town is derived from the Slavic word bely (white, bright, shiny). The manor is first mentioned in 1548. The manor house, locally referred to as the castle, was built in the 16th century. First documentation regarding the old village church dates from 1540, although the building contains Romanesque parts. A plague epidemic during the Thirty Years' War was reportedly only survived by two families.

The character of the place was rural for a long time. In 1842 a station on the Leipzig–Hof railway was opened in Böhlen. A schoolhouse with five classrooms was built in 1879. Böhlen was part of Amt Pegau until 1856, then of Gerichtsamt (judicial district) Zwenkau until 1875 and from then on of Amtshauptmannschaft (district) Leipzig.

Only from the 1920s on the village developed into an industrial location, mainly due to the lignite found in the area. In 1924 one of the largest lignite mines in the world of its time was opened west of Böhlen. It was equipped with a conveyor bridge of 200 m length and 50 m height.

Towards the end of World War II a subcamp of Buchenwald concentration camp was established, where 800 prisoners worked as forced labor in a Braunkohle-Benzin AG ("Brabag") plant. Due to the strategically important industry, Böhlen suffered heavy aerial attacks in 1944/1945.

The principal industries were transferred into Soviet administration after World War II, and were returned to the GDR in 1952. In the same year, the Kulturhaus (arts and leisure center) was opened. By administratively merging the power station, the coal processing plants, and the motor fuel works, the publicly owned Kombinat "Otto Grotewohl" was formed. On 7 October 1964 Böhlen was awarded town status.

The neighbouring village of Zeschwitz was incorporated administratively into Böhlen in 1942, but mined over from 1943. Likewise, Stöhna (partially mined over since 1955) was incorporated in 1960, Trachenau (mostly mined over 1962–1965) in 1964, and Großdeuben in 1997.

The chemical works were acquired by Dow Olefinverbund in 1995.

Today Böhlen, as well as its neighboring city Zwenkau, are profiting from the newly formed Neuseenland, where old open-cast mines are being converted into huge lakes.
