= Orne (Moselle) =

River in France

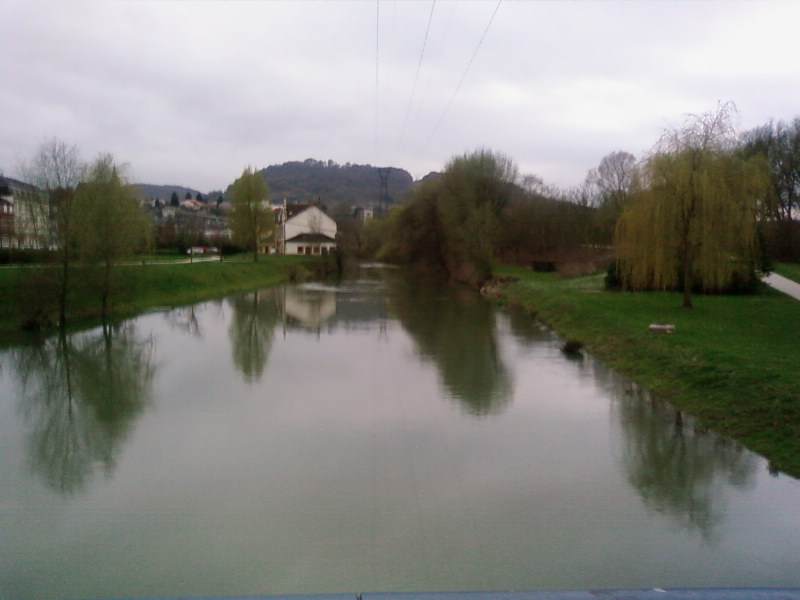
- The Orne flooding at Rombas

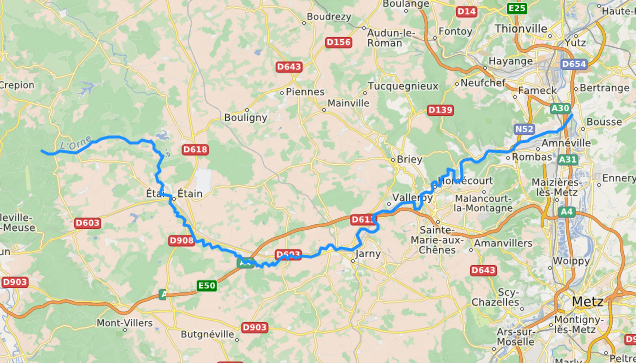

Location
- Country: France

Physical characteristics
- Source
  - location: Woëvre
  - elevation: 320 m (1,050 ft)
- Mouth
  - location: Moselle
  - coordinates: 49°17′15″N 6°10′55″E
- Length: 85.8 km (53.3 mi)
- Basin size: 1,268 km^{2} (490 mi^{2})
- Discharge
  - average: 12.4 m^{3}/s (440 cu ft/s)

Basin features
- Progression: Moselle→ Rhine→ North Sea

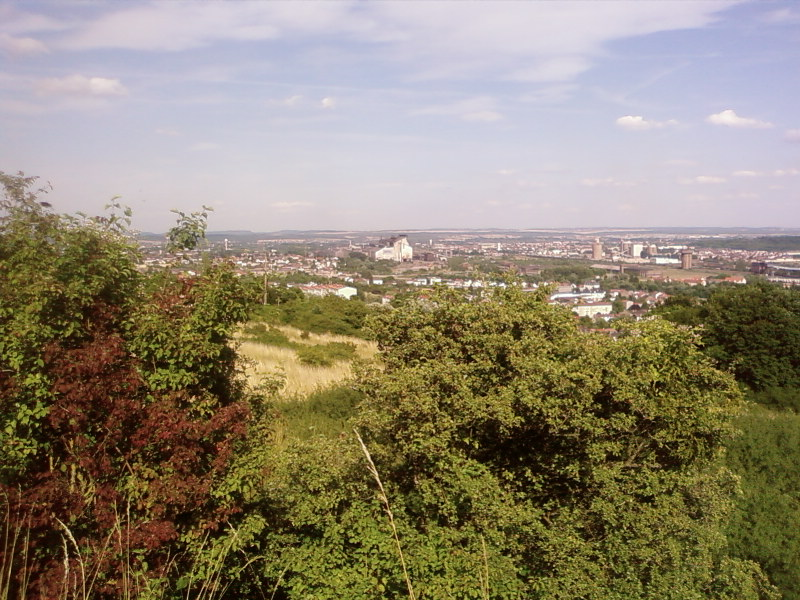
The Orne valley

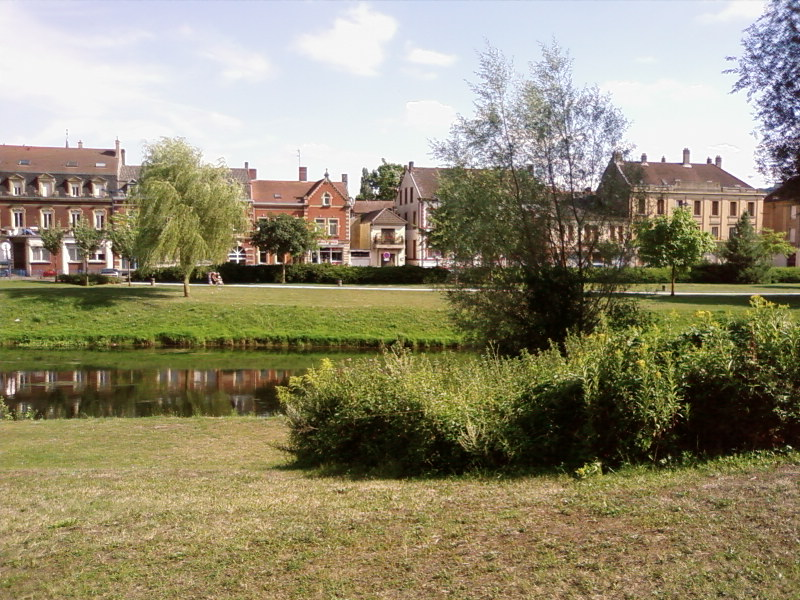
The Orne at Rombas

The Orne (French: [ɔʁn]) is a river in Grand Est, north-eastern France, which is a left tributary of the Moselle and sub-tributary of the Rhine. Its source is in the hills northeast of Verdun. It flows east and joins the Moselle near Mondelange, between Metz and Thionville.

== Name ==
"Orne" may originate from autura (a river, cf. Eure), or onna (a river) as mentioned in Endlicher's glossary of Gallic names De nominibus Gallicis, in which these words are translated into Latin as flumen.

If so, then there is no relationship with the name of the river Orne in Normandy, which is referred to as the Olina by Ptolemy, a homonym of Fluvius Olne, the Orne saosnoise in Sarthe, which Xavier Delamarre traces back to the Celtic olīnā (elbow).

== Geography ==
The Orne is 85.7 kilometres (53.3 mi) long. It rises at an elevation of 320 metres (1,050 ft) in the Côtes de Meuse, in the commune of Ornes. It flows through Étain, Conflans-en-Jarnisy, Auboué, Homécourt, Jœuf, Moyeuvre-Grande, Rosselange, Rombas, Clouange, Vitry-sur-Orne, Gandrange and Richemont, where it joins the Moselle at an elevation of 155 metres (509 ft).

The people of the Pays Orne-Moselle and Pays de l'Orne communes have formed an association for the creation of a riverside trail named "Fil Bleu" ("Blue Thread") or "Promenade des Berges de l'Orne" ("Promenade of the banks of the Orne"), which will extend the length of the riverbed. Currently the trail extends about 22 kilometres (14 mi) between the communes of Rombas/Clouange and Valleroy, and is either concrete or macadamised over all of this length. Between Rombas/Clouange and Rosselange, it exists on both sides of the river.

The section of about 2 kilometres (1.2 mi) from Joeuf to the naval base at Homècourt is marked by a number of bridges and footbridges permitting passage from one bank to the other. Two of these footbridges are however no longer passable: the "passerelle de Moyeuvre Grande" (for which a detour via road bridge exists) and the "passerelle de la base nautique d'Homècourt".

The trail is frequently used by both pedestrians and cyclists, as well as by those on rollerblades. It crosses the communes of Rombas, Clouange, Rosselange, Moyeuvre Grande, Joeuf, Homècourt, Aubouè, Moineville and Valleroy. Since 2011, the trail has been extended from its prior endpoint to the commune of Amnéville-les-Thermes. Between 500 and 600 metres (1,600 and 2,000 ft) of it have been built and are being maintained by the municipality of Rombas.

=== Tributaries ===
The Orne's principal tributaries and subtributaries are:

- Ruisseau de Vaux
- Moulin de Darmont
- Yron (sub-tributary Longeau)
- Rawé
- Woigot
- Conroy

The Orne is also fed by water pumped out of the mines at Jarny, Giraumont, Auboué and Orne-Roncourt.

== Hydrology ==
The Orne is a substantial river, similar to its neighbours in the West Lorraine region which rise in the Côtes de Meuse.

=== Flow rates of the Orne at Rosselange ===
The Orne's flow rate has been measured over a period of 40 years (1967–2007) at Rosselange, in the Moselle department a short way upstream of the confluence. The watershed of the Orne at Rosselange is 1,226 square kilometres (473 mi^{2}), almost its entire watershed of 1,268 square kilometres (490 mi^{2}).

The mean annual flow rate, or discharge of the river at Rosselange is 12.6 cubic metres per second (440 cu ft/s).

The Orne exhibits strongly marked seasonal fluctuations, such as are very often found in the east of France, with high water in winter/spring bringing the monthly average up to between 20.2 and 26.9 cubic metres per second (710 and 950 cu ft/s) from December to March inclusive, with a maximum in February. Summer low waters are quite prolonged, from June to early October, with a low monthly average of 2.81 cubic metres per second (99 cu ft/s) in September. These monthly figures, however, are just averages, and conceal even more pronounced short-term variation.

Monthly average flow rate in m^{3}/s measured at Rosselange hydrological station
Data taken over a 41-year period

At low water, the 3-year low instantaneous flow rate can drop to 0.56 cubic metres per second (20 cu ft/s), as is seen frequently for rivers of the region.

Flooding of the Orne can be very significant. The maximum instantaneous flow rate ever recorded was 318 cubic metres per second (11,200 cu ft/s) on 22 December 2003, while the maximum recorded daily average was 292 cubic metres per second (10,300 cu ft/s) on the preceding day. The Orne's instantaneous maximum flow rate for 2 and 5 years (IMFR2 and IMFR5) are 170 and 230 cubic metres per second (6,000 and 8,100 cu ft/s) respectively; the IMFR10 is 280 cubic metres per second (9,900 cu ft/s), the IMFR20 is 320 cubic metres per second (11,000 cu ft/s), and the IMFR50 is 370 cubic metres per second (13,000 cu ft/s). These figures indicate that the flood of December 2003 was, roughly speaking, a 20-year event and thus not particularly unusual. The Orne's IMFRs are over half that of the Meurthe, the Moselle's most significant French tributary and whose basin is almost 2.5 time larger.

To compare with a significant river in the Paris basin, the Loing, a river known for its substantial flooding, has an IMFR10 of 190 cubic metres per second (6,700 cu ft/s) as against 280 cubic metres per second (9,900 cu ft/s) for the Orne, and its IMFR50 reaches only 270 cubic metres per second (9,500 cu ft/s) as against 370 cubic metres per second (13,000 cu ft/s) for the Orne. This is despite the Loing's watershed being three and a half times larger than the Orne.

The Orne is fed by heavy rainfall in the western part of its watershed. The runoff curve number in its watershed is 326 millimetres (12.8 in) annually, which is almost equal to the average of all France, but clearly less than the average in the French part of the Moselle basin, 445 millimetres (17.5 in) at Hauconcourt. The specific flow rate reaches 10.3 litres per second per square kilometre of watershed.

=== Flow rates of members of the Orne basin ===
Name	Location	Flow rates in m^{3}/s							Côte max(m)	Max. instant.	Max. daily.	Runoff curve no. (mm)	Surface (km^{2})
Name	Location	Discharge	VCN3 (low w.)	IMFR2	IMFR5	IMFR10	IMFR20	IMFR50	Côte max(m)	Max. instant.	Max. daily.	Runoff curve no. (mm)	Surface (km^{2})
Ruisseau de Vaux	Morgemoulin	0.417	0.011	9.1	12	13	15	17	1.74	14.8	10.2	312	42
Orne	Boncourt	3.73	0.030	59	84	100	120	140	4.59	125	99.7	286	412
Yron	Jarny	4.01	0.130	82	120	140	170	200	3.53	169	139	332	383
Longeau	Jarny	2.17	-	-	-	-	-	-	-	-	-	320	214
Woigot	Briey	1.25	0.067	16	25	30	35	42	2.67	56.2	23.1	522	76
Orne	Rosselange	12.6	0.560	170	230	270	320	370	3.98	318	292	326	1,226

=== See also ===
- List of rivers of France

=== External links ===
- "Characteristic flow rates of the Orne" (PDF). Archived from the original (PDF) on 2006-11-21.
