= Donald J. Gott =

U.S. Army Air Forces officer

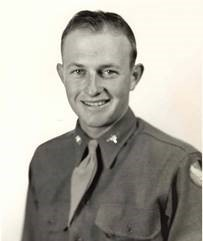
- Born: June 3, 1923; Arnett, Oklahoma
- Died: November 9, 1944 (aged 21); Hattonville, Meuse, France
- Burial place: Harmon Cemetery, Harmon, Oklahoma
- Military career
- Allegiance: United States of America
- Branch: United States Army Air Forces
- Service years: 1943–1944
- Rank: First Lieutenant
- Nickname: Don
- Units: 729th Bomb Squadron, 452nd Bomb Group (Heavy)
- Conflicts: World War II
- Awards: Medal of Honor; Purple Heart; Air Medal (4)

Donald Joseph Gott (June 3, 1923 – November 9, 1944) was a United States Army Air Forces officer and a recipient of the United States military's highest decoration—the Medal of Honor—for his actions in World War II.

== Biography ==
Born in Arnett, Oklahoma on June 3, 1923, Gott had two older sisters and one older brother. He graduated from high school in Fargo, Oklahoma and then enrolled at a technical school in Enid, Oklahoma. Gott was hired to fill a war production position at an aluminum plant in Bridgeport, Connecticut, but volunteered for the Army aviation cadet program on September 21, 1942. He left his job in Bridgeport to report for flight training in March 1943.

Gott was commissioned as a second lieutenant on January 6, 1944, and by November 9, 1944 was a first lieutenant serving as a B-17 Flying Fortress pilot in the 729th Bomb Squadron, 452nd Bombardment Group. On that day, during a bombing mission in B-17G 42-97904 over Saarbrücken, Germany, his plane was severely damaged and several of the crew wounded by enemy fire. Knowing that the most seriously injured crewman radio operator Tech. Sgt. Robert A. Dunlap needed immediate medical aid, and fearing that he would not receive such aid if he was dropped by parachute into enemy territory, Gott and the co-pilot, William E. Metzger Jr., decided to try to fly the crippled aircraft back into Allied territory.

Upon reaching friendly airspace and lacking a working intercom system, Metzger left the cockpit to tell the other crewmen to parachute to safety. Gott and Metzger then attempted a crash landing, but the aircraft overshot an open plain and struck a forested area near Hattonville, Meuse, France. Unbeknownst to the pilots, tail gunner Staff Sgt. Herman B. Krimminger had failed to jump clear of the plane and his parachute had become entangled in the tail section. Gott, Dunlap, Krimminger and Metzger were killed as a result of the crash, explosions and fire. For their actions, both Gott and Metzger were posthumously awarded the Medal of Honor six months later, on May 16, 1945.

Remains of the four crash victims were recovered and buried along with their identification tags in four graves at a temporary U.S. Army cemetery in Limey, Meurthe-et-Moselle, France on November 11, 1944. Gott, aged 21 at his death, was reburied at Harmon Cemetery, Harmon, Oklahoma in August 1948.

The description of the crash in the citation below is wrong. It describes the crash of B-24J 42-51226 further to the west in Tincourt-Boucly, Somme, France which killed three different U.S. airmen on November 10, 1944.

== Awards and decorations ==

Army Air Forces Pilot Badge
Medal of Honor	Purple Heart	Air Medal with three oak leaf clusters
American Campaign Medal	European–African–Middle Eastern Campaign Medal	World War II Victory Medal

=== Medal of Honor citation ===
First Lieutenant Gott's official Medal of Honor citation reads:

On a bombing run upon the marshaling yards at Saarbrücken a B-17 aircraft piloted by 1st. Lt. Gott was seriously damaged by antiaircraft fire. Three of the aircraft's engines were damaged beyond control and on fire; dangerous flames from the No. 4 engine were leaping back as far as the tail assembly. Flares in the cockpit were ignited and a fire raged therein, which was further increased by free-flowing fluid from damaged hydraulic lines. The interphone system was rendered useless. In addition to these serious mechanical difficulties the engineer was wounded in the leg and the radio operator's arm was severed below the elbow. Suffering from intense pain, despite the application of a tourniquet, the radio operator fell unconscious. Faced with the imminent explosion of his aircraft, and death to his entire crew, mere seconds before bombs away on the target, 1st. Lt. Gott and his copilot conferred. Something had to be done immediately to save the life of the wounded radio operator. The lack of a static line and the thought that his unconscious body striking the ground in unknown territory would not bring immediate medical attention forced a quick decision. 1st. Lt. Gott and his copilot decided to fly the flaming aircraft to friendly territory and then attempt to crash land. Bombs were released on the target and the crippled aircraft proceeded alone to Allied-controlled territory. When that had been reached, 1st. Lt. Gott had the copilot personally inform all crewmembers to bail out. The copilot chose to remain with 1st. Lt. Gott in order to assist in landing the bomber. With only one normally functioning engine, and with the danger of explosion much greater, the aircraft banked into an open field, and when it was at an altitude of 100 feet it exploded, crashed, exploded again and then disintegrated. All 3 crewmembers were instantly killed. 1st. Lt. Gott's loyalty to his crew, his determination to accomplish the task set forth to him, and his deed of knowingly performing what may have been his last service to his country was an example of valor at its highest.

== See also ==
- List of Medal of Honor recipients
- List of Medal of Honor recipients for World War II
