= William Metzger =

William Metzger may refer to:

- William E. Metzger (1868–1933), Detroit automotive pioneer and organizer of Cadillac and E-M-F
- William E. Metzger Jr. (1922–1944), American airman and Medal of Honor recipient
- William Metzger (character), a fictional character from Marvel Comics
