= William E. Metzger Jr. =

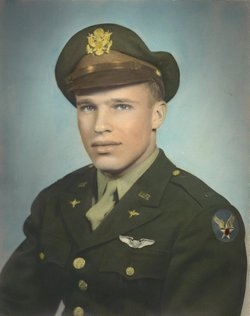
- Born: February 9, 1922; Lima, Ohio, US
- Died: November 9, 1944 (aged 22); Hattonville, Meuse, France
- Burial place: Woodlawn Cemetery, Lima, Ohio
- Military career
- Allegiance: United States of America
- Branch: United States Army Air Forces
- Service years: 1942–1944
- Rank: Second Lieutenant
- Nickname: Bill
- Units: 729th Bombardment Squadron, 452nd Bomb Group (Heavy)
- Conflicts: World War II †
- Awards: Medal of Honor; Purple Heart

William Edward Metzger Jr. (February 9, 1922 – November 9, 1944) was a United States Army Air Forces officer and a recipient of the United States military's highest decoration—the Medal of Honor—for his actions in World War II.

== Biography ==
Born in Lima, Ohio on February 9, 1922, Metzger had two sisters. In 1940, he graduated from the former Lima Central High School (replaced by Lima Senior High School in 1955) and was hired by an electric motor manufacturer in Lima. On October 5, 1942, Metzger left his job to enlist in the Army at Toledo, Ohio. He then served at Camp Perry, Ohio and Camp Young, California before being accepted into the aviation cadet program in March 1943.

Metzger was commissioned as a second lieutenant on August 21, 1944, and by November 9, 1944 was serving as the co-pilot of a B-17 Flying Fortress in the 729th Bomb Squadron, 452nd Bombardment Group. On that day, during a bombing mission in B-17G 42-97904 over Saarbrücken, Germany, his plane was severely damaged and several of the crew wounded by enemy fire. Knowing that the most seriously injured crewman radio operator Tech. Sgt. Robert A. Dunlap needed immediate medical aid, and fearing that he would not receive such aid if he was dropped by parachute into enemy territory, Metzger and the pilot, Donald J. Gott, decided to try to fly the crippled aircraft back into Allied territory.

Upon reaching friendly airspace and lacking a working intercom system, Metzger left the cockpit to tell the other crewmen to parachute to safety. Metzger and Gott then attempted a crash landing, but the aircraft overshot an open plain and struck a forested area near Hattonville, Meuse, France. Unbeknownst to the pilots, tail gunner Staff Sgt. Herman B. Krimminger had failed to jump clear of the plane and his parachute had become entangled in the tail section. Metzger, Dunlap, Gott and Krimminger were killed as a result of the crash, explosions and fire. For their actions, both Metzger and Gott were posthumously awarded the Medal of Honor six months later, on May 16, 1945.

Remains of the four crash victims were recovered and buried along with their identification tags in four graves at a temporary U.S. Army cemetery in Limey, Meurthe-et-Moselle, France on November 11, 1944. Metzger, aged 22 at his death, was reburied at Woodlawn Cemetery in his hometown of Lima, Ohio on August 30, 1948.

The description of the crash in the citation below is wrong. It describes the crash of B-24J 42-51226 further to the west in Tincourt-Boucly, Somme, France which killed three different U.S. airmen on November 10, 1944.

== Medal of Honor citation ==
Second Lieutenant Metzger's official Medal of Honor citation reads:

On a bombing run upon the marshaling yards at Saarbrücken, Germany, on 9 November 1944, a B17 aircraft on which 2d Lt. Metzger was serving as copilot was seriously damaged by antiaircraft fire. Three of the aircraft's engines were damaged beyond control and on fire; dangerous flames from the No. 4 engine were leaping back as far as the tail assembly. Flares in the cockpit were ignited and a fire roared therein which was further increased by free-flowing fluid from damaged hydraulic lines. The interphone system was rendered useless. In addition to these serious mechanical difficulties the engineer was wounded in the leg and the radio operator's arm was severed below the elbow. Suffering from intense pain, despite the application of a tourniquet, the radio operator fell unconscious. Faced with the imminent explosion of his aircraft and death to his entire crew, mere seconds before bombs away on the target, 2d Lt. Metzger and his pilot conferred. Something had to be done immediately to save the life of the wounded radio operator. The lack of a static line and the thought that his unconscious body striking the ground in unknown territory would not bring immediate medical attention forced a quick decision. 2d Lt. Metzger and his pilot decided to fly the flaming aircraft to friendly territory and then attempt to crash land. Bombs were released on the target and the crippled aircraft proceeded along to Allied-controlled territory. When that had been reached 2d Lt. Metzger personally informed all crewmembers to bail out upon the suggestion of the pilot. 2d Lt. Metzger chose to remain with the pilot for the crash landing in order to assist him in this emergency. With only 1 normally functioning engine and with the danger of explosion much greater, the aircraft banked into an open field, and when it was at an altitude of 100 feet it exploded, crashed, exploded again, and then disintegrated. All 3 crewmembers were instantly killed. 2d Lt. Metzger's loyalty to his crew, his determination to accomplish the task set forth to him, and his deed of knowingly performing what may have been his last service to his country was an example of valor at its highest.

== Awards and decorations ==

Badge	Army Air Forces Pilot Badge		
1st row	Medal of Honor		Purple Heart
2nd row	American Campaign Medal	European–African–Middle Eastern Campaign Medal with 1 Campaign star	World War II Victory Medal

== Legacy ==
Metzger Lake Reservoir in Allen County, Ohio, which was built in 1946, is named in his honor.

== See also ==
- List of Medal of Honor recipients
