= Ornes =

Ornes may refer to the following places:

- Ornes, Meuse, Grand Est, France
- Ornes, Vestland, Norway
- Ørnes, Nordland, Norway
