= Ville-sur-Yron =

- Commune
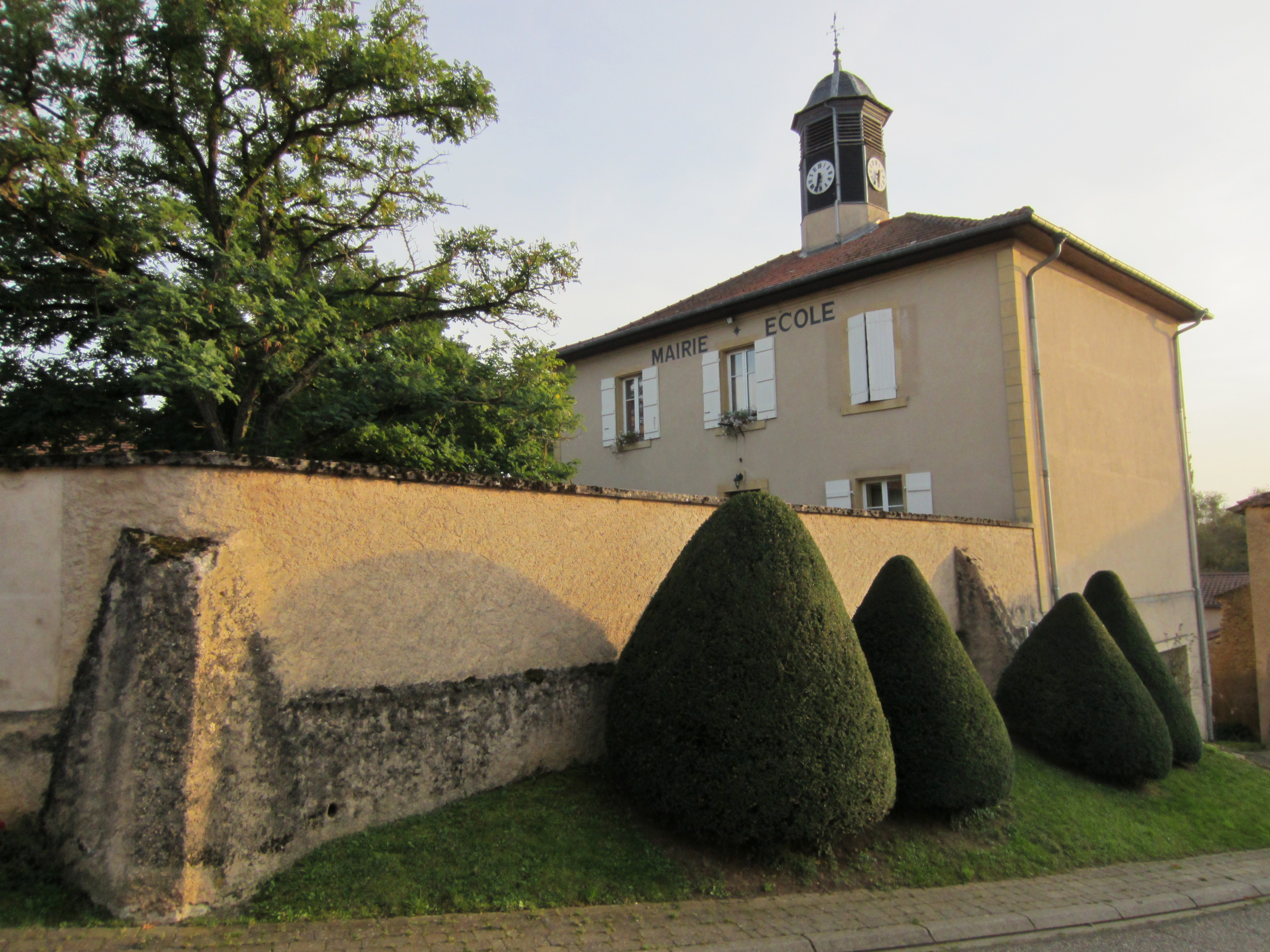
- The town hall in Ville-sur-Yron

- Coat of arms
- Location of Ville-sur-Yron
- Location within France Location within Grand Est
- Coordinates: 49°07′07″N 5°51′58″E
- Country: France
- Region: Grand Est
- Department: Meurthe-et-Moselle
- Arrondissement: Val-de-Briey
- Canton: Jarny
- Intercommunality: Orne Lorraine Confluences

Government
  - Mayor (2020–2026): Maud Lorenzi
- Area^{1}: 11.3 km^{2} (4.4 sq mi)
- Elevation: 240 m (790 ft)
- Highest elevation: 252 m (827 ft)
- Lowest elevation: 190 m (620 ft)
- Population (2023): 293
  - Density: 25.9/km^{2} (67.2/sq mi)
- Time zone: UTC+01:00 (CET)
  - Summer (DST): UTC+02:00 (CEST)
- INSEE/Postal code: 54581 /54800
- ^{1} French Land Register data, which excludes lakes, ponds, glaciers > 1 km^{2} (0.386 sq mi or 247 acres) and river estuaries.

Ville-sur-Yron (French pronunciation: [vil syʁ iʁɔ̃], literally Ville on Yron) is a commune in the Meurthe-et-Moselle department in north-eastern France.

== See also ==
- Communes of the Meurthe-et-Moselle department
- Parc naturel régional de Lorraine
