= Longeau =

Longeau may refer to:

- Longeau, Belgium, a village of Wallonia in the province of Luxembourg, part of the municipality of Messancy.
- Longeau (river), a river in the Lorraine region of France.
