= Moyeuvre =

Moyeuvre is the name of two adjacent communes in the Moselle department of France.

- Moyeuvre-Grande
- Moyeuvre-Petite
