= Yron =

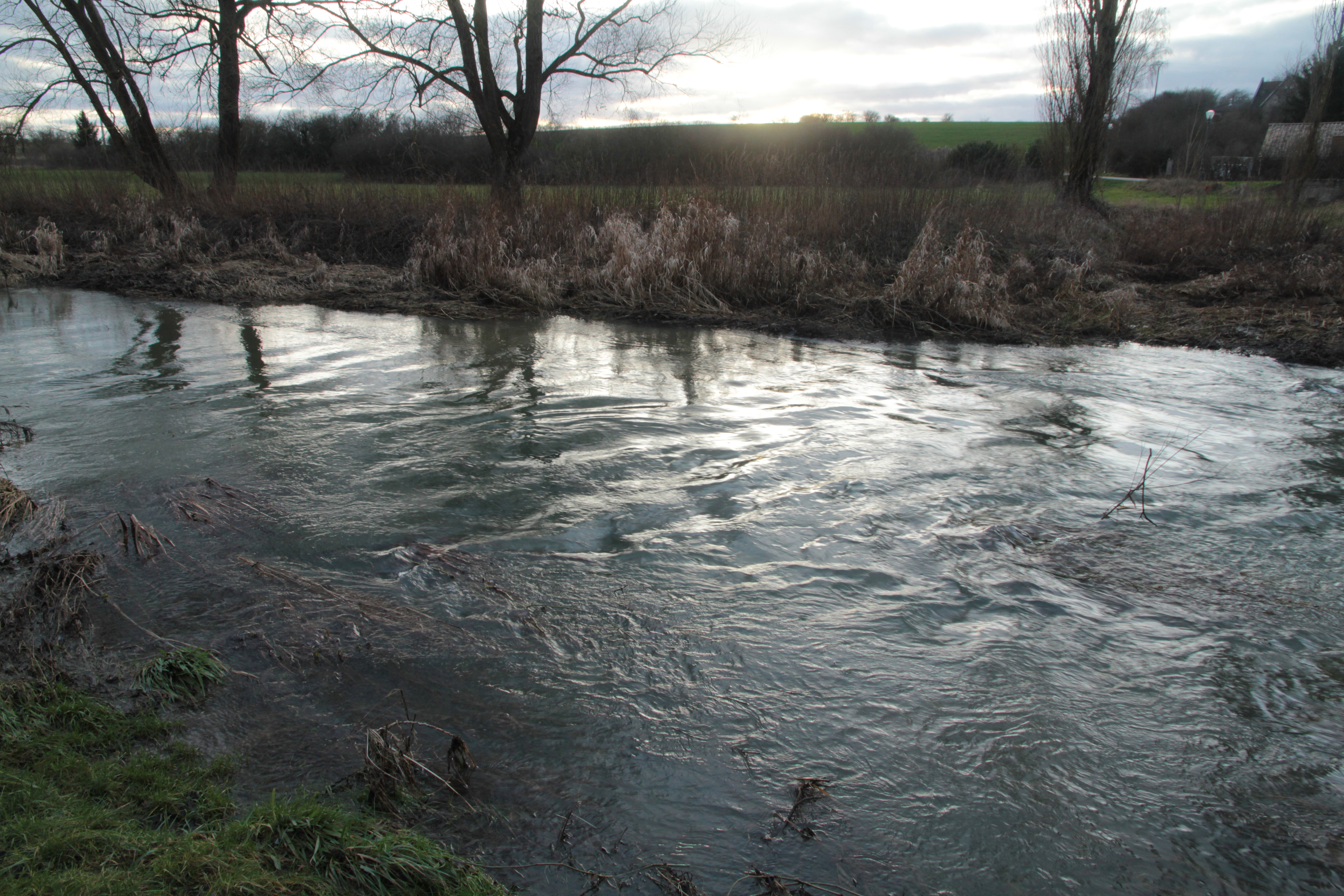

- Location within France Location within Grand Est

Location
- Country: France

Physical characteristics
- Source
  - location: Vigneulles-lès-Hattonchâtel
  - coordinates: 48.9783°N 5.6827°E
- Mouth
  - location: Orne
  - coordinates: 49.1673°N 5.862°E
- Length: 37.4 kilometres (23.2 mi)
- Basin size: 380 square kilometres (150 mi^{2})
- Discharge
  - average: 4.01 m^{3}/s (142 cu ft/s)

Basin features
- Progression: Orne→ Moselle→ Rhine→ North Sea
- Tributaries
  - left: Longeau

The Yron (French pronunciation: [iʁɔ̃]) is a 37.4-kilometre (23.2 mi) long river in the Lorraine (region) of northeastern France. It rises in Vigneulles-lès-Hattonchâtel and runs generally northeast to join the Orne river at Conflans-en-Jarnisy.
