= Longeau (river) =

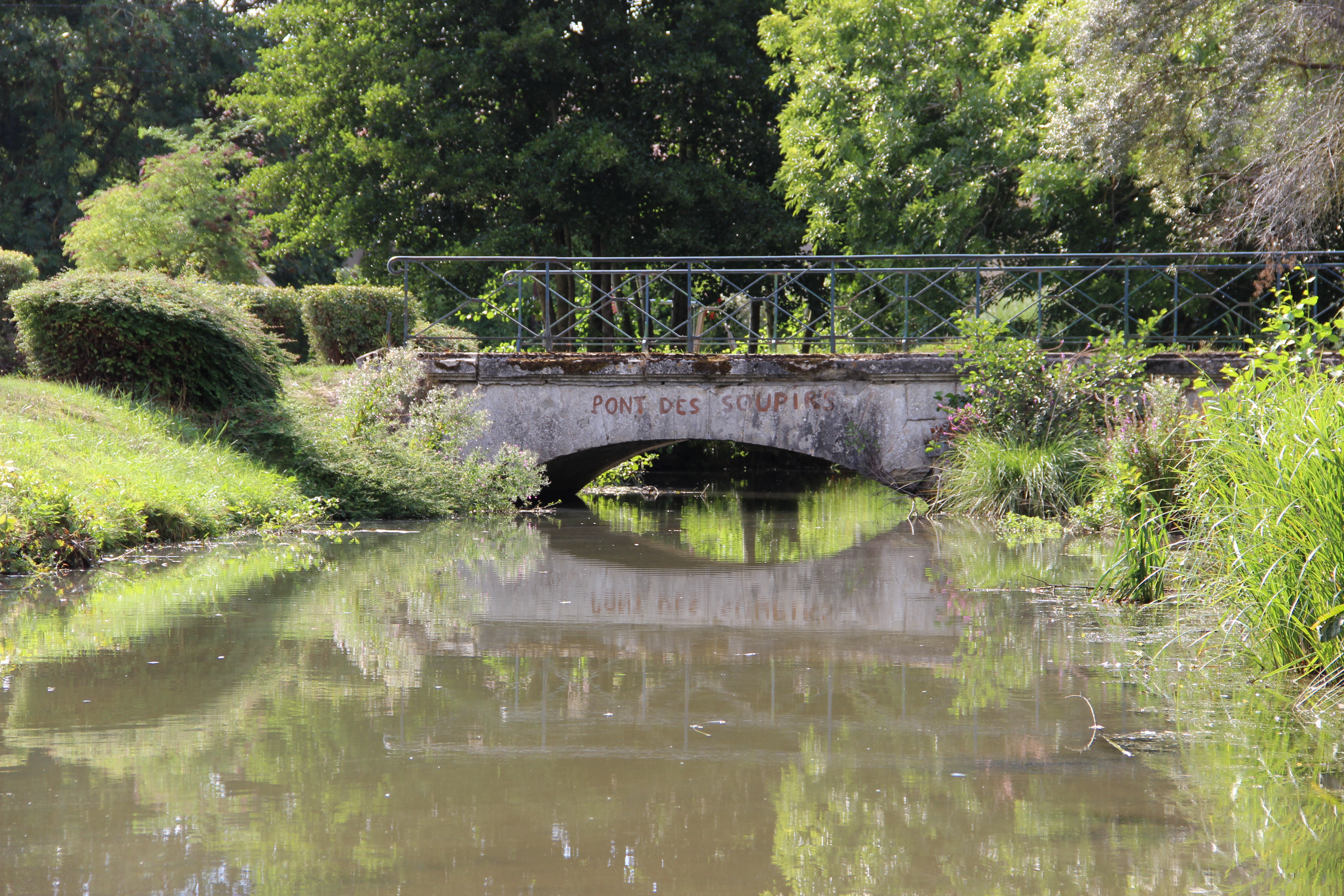

- Location within France Location within Grand Est

Location
- Country: France

Physical characteristics
- Source
  - location: Hannonville-sous-les-Côtes
  - coordinates: 49.0212°N 5.636°E
- Mouth
  - location: Yron
  - coordinates: 49.1477°N 5.8578°E
- Length: 37.5 km (23.3 mi)
- Basin size: 213 km^{2} (82 mi^{2})

Basin features
- Progression: Yron→ Orne→ Moselle→ Rhine→ North Sea

The Longeau (French pronunciation: [lɔ̃ʒo]) is a 37.5-kilometre (23.3 mi) long river in the Grand Est of northeastern France. It rises in Hannonville-sous-les-Côtes and runs generally northeast to join the river Yron at Jarny.
