= Serémange-Erzange =

- Commune
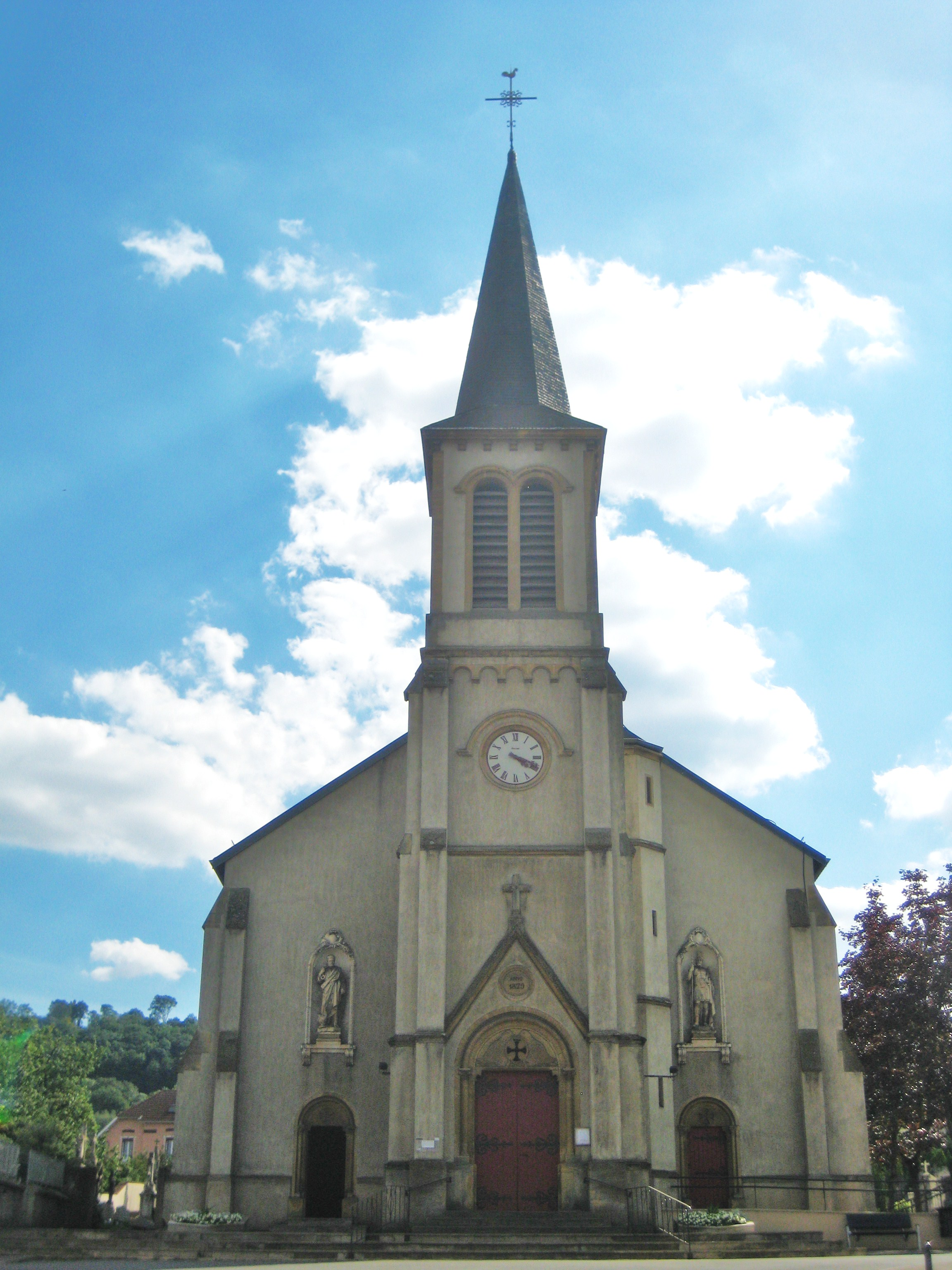
- The church in Serémange

- Coat of arms
- Location of Serémange-Erzange
- Location within France Location within Grand Est
- Coordinates: 49°19′17″N 6°05′28″E
- Country: France
- Region: Grand Est
- Department: Moselle
- Arrondissement: Thionville
- Canton: Hayange
- Intercommunality: CA du Val de Fensch

Government
  - Mayor (2020–2026): Serge Jurczak
- Area^{1}: 3.75 km^{2} (1.45 sq mi)
- Elevation: 200 m (660 ft)
- Highest elevation: 301 m (988 ft)
- Lowest elevation: 169 m (554 ft)
- Population (2023): 4,251
  - Density: 1,130/km^{2} (2,940/sq mi)
- Time zone: UTC+01:00 (CET)
  - Summer (DST): UTC+02:00 (CEST)
- INSEE/Postal code: 57647 /57290
- ^{1} French Land Register data, which excludes lakes, ponds, glaciers > 1 km^{2} (0.386 sq mi or 247 acres) and river estuaries.

Serémange-Erzange (French pronunciation: [səʁemɑ̃ʒ ɛʁzɑ̃ʒ]; German: Schremingen-Ersingen; Lorraine Franconian Schreméngen-Ierséngen) is a commune in the Moselle department in Grand Est in north-eastern France. The commune is composed of the localities Serémange, Erzange and Suzange.

== History ==
Sérémange was chosen by Jean-Martin Wendel in 1704 to site his steel-making plant, which continues to present-day as Wendel S.E. a company listed on the Euronext stock exchange.

== Population ==
Historical population
Year	Pop.	±% p.a.
1968	4,976	—
1975	4,613	−1.08%
1982	4,547	−0.21%
1990	4,143	−1.16%
1999	4,035	−0.29%
2007	4,098	+0.19%
2012	4,244	+0.70%
2017	4,273	+0.14%
2023	4,251	−0.09%
Source: INSEE

== See also ==
- Communes of the Moselle department
