= Vitry-sur-Orne =

- Commune
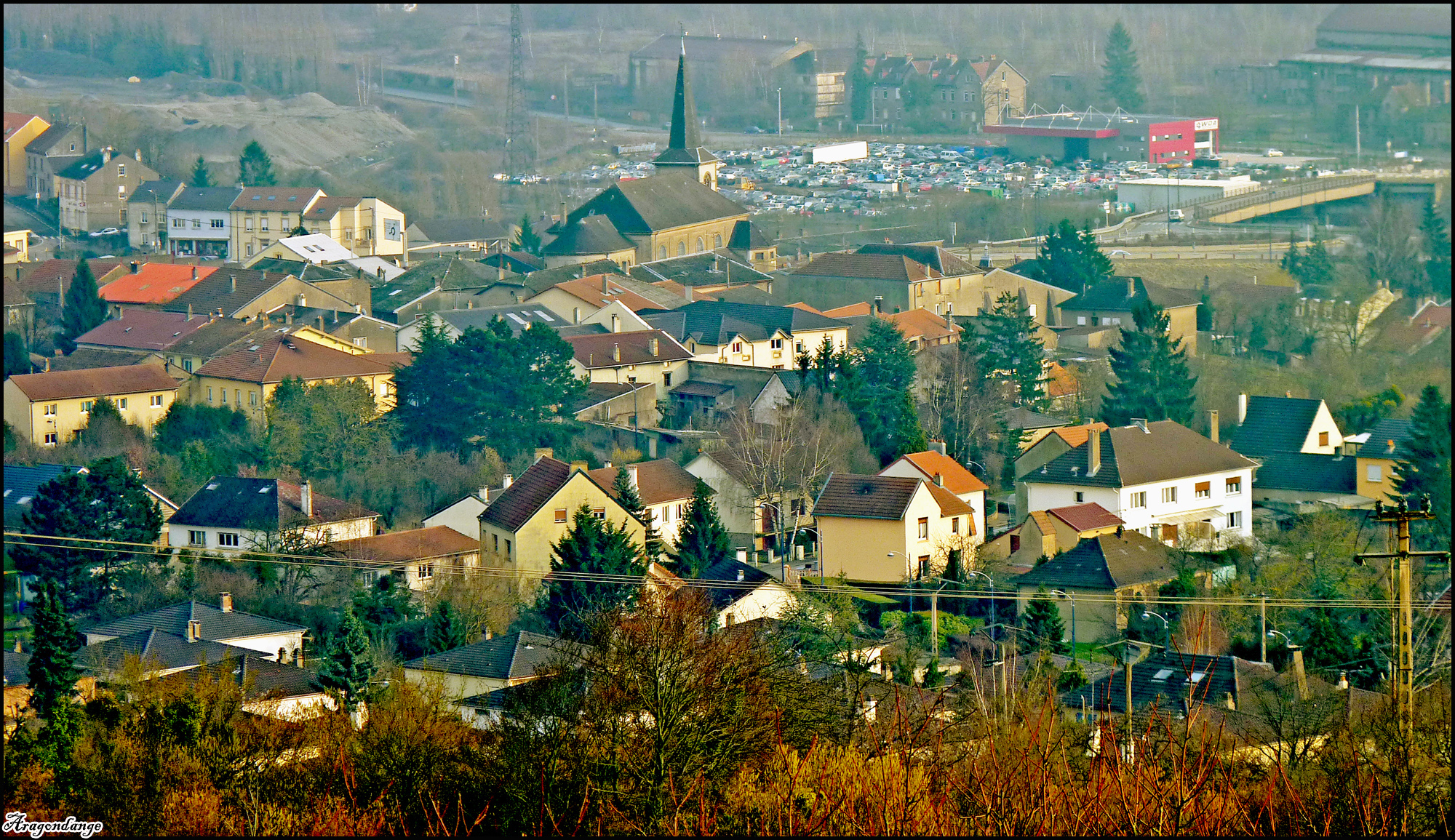
- A general view of Vitry-sur-Orne

- Coat of arms
- Location of Vitry-sur-Orne
- Location within France Location within Grand Est
- Coordinates: 49°15′58″N 6°06′34″E
- Country: France
- Region: Grand Est
- Department: Moselle
- Arrondissement: Thionville
- Canton: Hayange
- Intercommunality: Pays Orne-Moselle

Government
  - Mayor (2020–2026): Luc Corradi
- Area^{1}: 7.61 km^{2} (2.94 sq mi)
- Highest elevation: 360 m (1,180 ft)
- Lowest elevation: 157 m (515 ft)
- Population (2023): 2,884
  - Density: 379/km^{2} (982/sq mi)
- Demonym(s): Vitrien, Vitrienne
- Time zone: UTC+01:00 (CET)
  - Summer (DST): UTC+02:00 (CEST)
- INSEE/Postal code: 57724 /57185
- Website: www.vitry-sur-orne.com
- ^{1} French Land Register data, which excludes lakes, ponds, glaciers > 1 km^{2} (0.386 sq mi or 247 acres) and river estuaries.

Vitry-sur-Orne (French pronunciation: [vitʁi syʁ ɔʁn], literally Vitry on Orne; German: Wallingen) is a commune in the Moselle department in Grand Est in north-eastern France. It is part of the urban area of Metz.

== Population ==
Historical population
| Year | Pop. | ±% p.a. |
|---|---|---|
| 1968 | 2,708 | — |
| 1975 | 2,671 | −0.20% |
| 1982 | 2,512 | −0.87% |
| 1990 | 2,369 | −0.73% |
| 1999 | 2,332 | −0.17% |
| 2007 | 2,603 | +1.38% |
| 2012 | 3,003 | +2.90% |
| 2017 | 3,019 | +0.11% |
| 2023 | 2,884 | −0.76% |
Source: INSEE

== See also ==
- Communes of the Moselle department
