= Pierrevillers =

- Commune
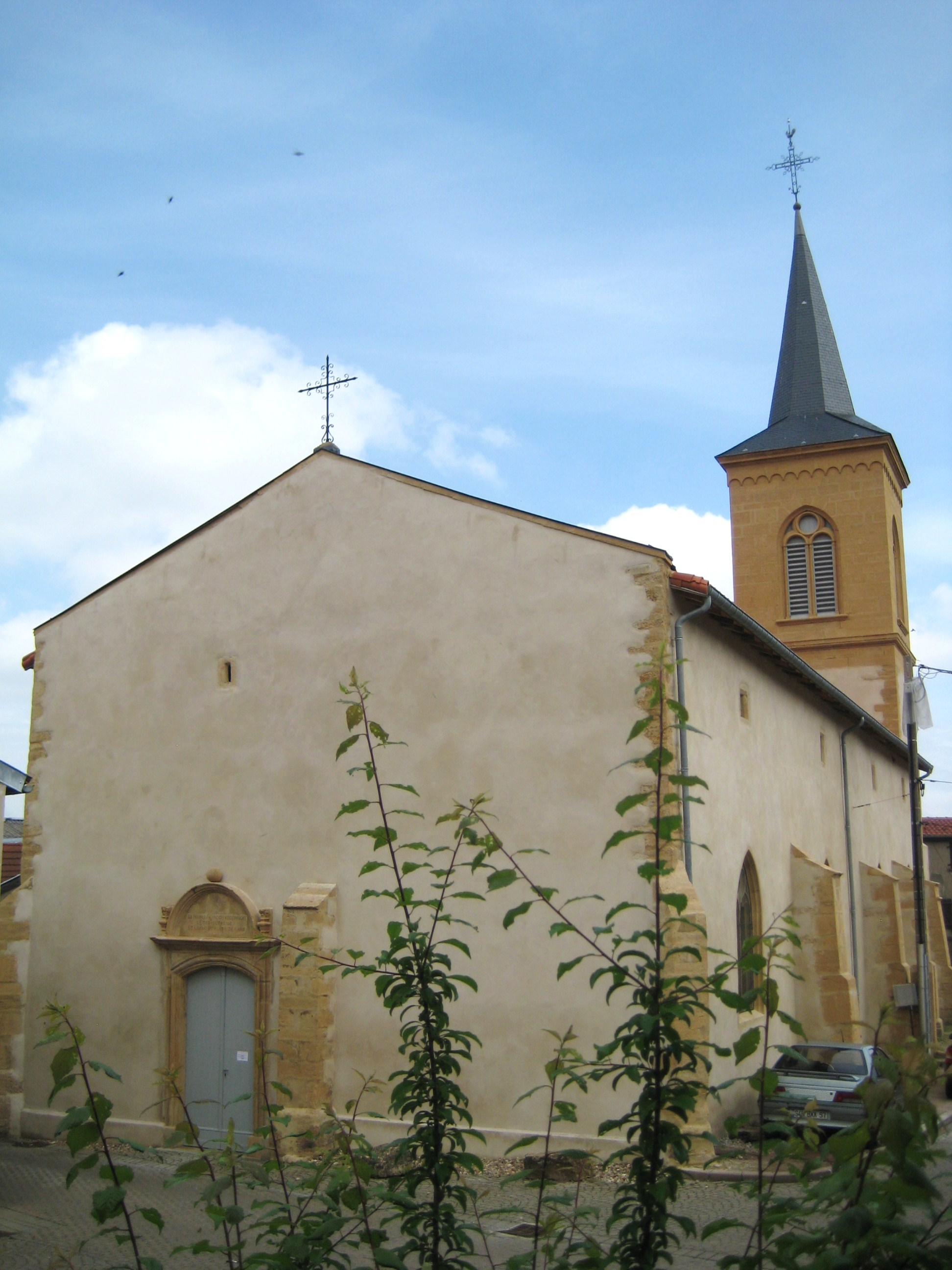
- The Church of Saint Martin, Pierrevillers

- Coat of arms
- Location of Pierrevillers
- Location within France Location within Grand Est
- Coordinates: 49°13′28″N 6°06′07″E
- Country: France
- Region: Grand Est
- Department: Moselle
- Arrondissement: Metz
- Canton: Rombas
- Intercommunality: Pays Orne-Moselle

Government
  - Mayor (2020–2026): René Heiser
- Area^{1}: 5.83 km^{2} (2.25 sq mi)
- Highest elevation: 403 m (1,322 ft)
- Lowest elevation: 192 m (630 ft)
- Population (2023): 1,443
  - Density: 248/km^{2} (641/sq mi)
- Demonym(s): Pierrevillois, Pierrevilloise
- Time zone: UTC+01:00 (CET)
  - Summer (DST): UTC+02:00 (CEST)
- INSEE/Postal code: 57543 /57120
- ^{1} French Land Register data, which excludes lakes, ponds, glaciers > 1 km^{2} (0.386 sq mi or 247 acres) and river estuaries.

Pierrevillers (French pronunciation: [pjɛʁvile]; German: Petersweiler) is a commune in the Moselle department in Grand Est in north-eastern France. It is part of the urban area of Metz.

== Geography ==
=== Location ===
15 km from Metz and an equal distance from Thionville, the village of Pierrevillers is located in the north-west of the Moselle. On the Moselle coastline, it is part of the Moselle Valley while the neighbouring town of Rombas is in the Orne valley. It is also situated next to the commune of Marange-Silvange.

The A4 motorway linking Paris to Strasbourg is 1 km away and the forthcoming construction of the VR 52 makes the village well served by major roads.

Close to peripheral agglomerations, it remains a fairly sparsely populated village compared to the neighbouring communes.

=== Climate ===
The degraded oceanic climate bears witness to the continental influence; the village therefore benefits from temperatures that can be high in summer and harsh in winter.

=== Neighbouring municipalities ===
Pierrevillers shares its administrative boundaries with three other communes: Amnéville (enclave of Malancourt-la-Montagne), Marange-Silvange and Rombas.

== History ==
Depended on the châtellenie de Briey, which was once owned by the Dukes of Mosellane.

=== Antiquity ===
The first traces of human habitation found in Pierrevillers are well out of the area that today constitutes the town, since they are situated at the highest point of the forest, on the edge of the territory of the commune of Rombas, at the place called Château de Drince. At the beginning of the century, the remains of an entrenched settlement prior to Roman colonization were spotted and reported. The remains of this remarkable oppidum on the Drince coast are still very visible and attest to the presence in the region of the Celtic people, the Mediomatrici (approx. 3rd century).

The commune has a probable Gallo-Roman origin, a charter of the year 960 mentions it under the name of Petraevillare, which means villa (agricultural domain) built on stone. A few steps away from the town hall, shards of Gallo-Roman pottery from the 15th century were unearthed a few years after the 1940 war, during the construction of a dwelling house.

On 20 June 2013, preventive excavations in the courtyard of the Templars uncovered a Roman villa with a hypocaust.

A deposit of seventeen metal objects dating from the Bronze Age was discovered at Pierrevillers on the Drince coast in 2014. These objects are part of the collections of the Musée de la Cour d'Or.

=== From the Thirty Years' War to the Revolution ===
In the 17th century, the Thirty Years' War did not spare the commune. Like many villages in Lorraine, it was ravaged and plundered by the various troops that criss-crossed the region and in particular by the Croats during the capture of Pierrevillers in 1636. Pierrevillers was burned and destroyed. The formation of villages in Lorraine is too often linked to the periods that followed the ravages of the Thirty Years' War, but for Pierrevillers, it is difficult to attribute to an existing construction a date that goes back before the 18th century. The oldest door lintel dated in the commune indicates the year 1709 without knowing whether it is a reconstruction, modification or extension.

Until the Revolution, village life was organised around one main activity: vine growing. The professions of the villagers included a majority of wine growers, coopers and distillers. The very structure of the village, which we still know today, is marked by this activity: narrow streets, almost non-existent usoirs, small houses with vaulted cellars often accessible from the street, additional vats placed at the back of the houses.

In 1794, François de Pange and his younger brother Jacques were hidden there by the Marlier family (from which their servant Joseph came) before reaching the Austrian Netherlands on foot.

=== The Industrial and Contemporary Era ===
The vineyard declined towards the end of the 19th century and practically disappeared at the beginning of the 20th century, due to vine diseases (phylloxera, mildew) but also because of the increase in trade with the more favoured wine-growing regions and the important industrial development of the Orne valley.

Quite rare in the old streets, the ploughmen's houses have, in addition to the dwelling, a housing for the cattle and a barn accessible by a carriage door. Larger, these constructions are more frequent in the rue de Verdun, they were generally built in the 19th century.

This urban structure was to be preserved until the construction of "la Cité" from the tile of the Pierrevillers mine, at the end of the 19th century, where the minette, a stratum of iron ore outcropping on the upstream side of the commune, was exploited. The first mining concession dates from 1898. Delivered to the Maizières-lès-Metz plant, the ore provided a living for around 150 miners, with an annual production of less than 25,000 tonnes. The mine ceased its activity between 1901 and 1913, when it merged with the Marange-Silvange mine. The 572,000 tonnes extracted annually by 300 miners were transported by cable (counterweights of this line, erected on the ground, remain visible from the national road between Pierrevillers and Marange) to the newly founded Hagondange plant. The mine closed definitively in 1931, given the difficulties of the steel market.

Around 1900, houses were built on rue de la Mine to house the workers, as well as a canteen whose building still exists at 167 avenue de Verdun.

From the 1950s onwards, new housing estates sprang up which, together with the creation of new roads, constituted for Pierrevillers the most rapid expansion in its history.

== See also ==
- Communes of the Moselle department
