= Château de Hattonchâtel =

Château in Grand Est, France

Coordinates: 48°59′33″N 5°42′21″E

The Château de Hattonchâtel in winter

The Château de Hattonchâtel is a château in the commune of Vigneulles-lès-Hattonchâtel in the Meuse département of France.

The site was fortified in 860 by Hatto, Bishop of Verdun, whose name it bears, on a rocky promontory overlooking the Woëvre flat land. The settlement became the chief stronghold of the bishops and also the location of their mint until 1546. In 1636 the retreating Swedes besieged and burnt most of the town.

The medieval castle was destroyed during World War I in 1918. The site was entirely reconstructed between 1923 and 1928 by Henri Jacquelin, a Norman architect originally from Evreux, in the Neo-Renaissance style. He produced the ultimate "troubadour" château of Lorraine, a pastiche which used some remains from the 11th-century building. The work was financed by the American benefactor Belle Skinner.

The Château de Hattonchâtel has been listed as a monument historique by the French Ministry of Culture since 1986 and is privately owned.

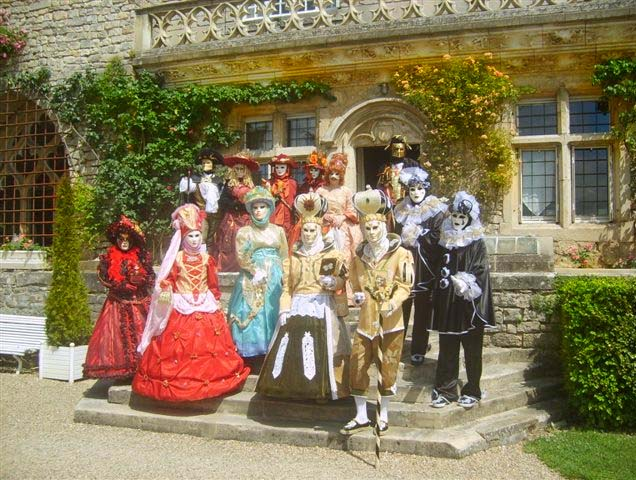
Masquerade ball at Château de Hattonchâtel, France 2008

The château is run as a hotel, wedding and conference centre.

The village of Hattonchâtel was an autonomous commune until 1973, when with several other villages it was incorporated in the Vigneulles-lès-Hattonchâtel municipality.

== See also ==
- List of castles in France
