= Rombas =

- Commune
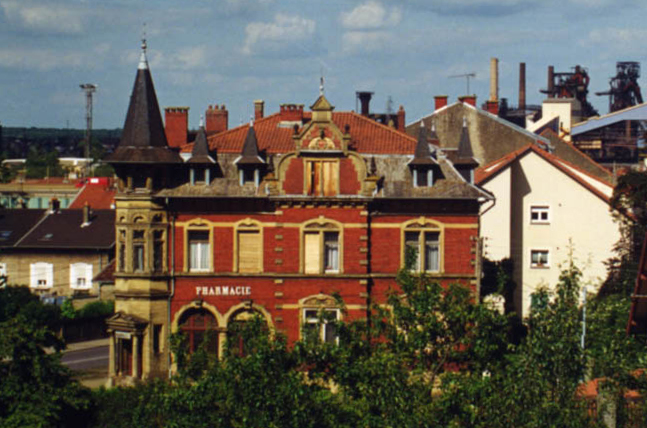
- The 'Rue de Metz pharmacy

- Coat of arms
- Location of Rombas
- Location within France Location within Grand Est
- Coordinates: 49°15′01″N 6°05′42″E
- Country: France
- Region: Grand Est
- Department: Moselle
- Arrondissement: Metz
- Canton: Rombas
- Intercommunality: CC Pays Orne-Moselle

Government
  - Mayor (2020–2026): Lionel Fournier
- Area^{1}: 11.69 km^{2} (4.51 sq mi)
- Elevation: 200 m (660 ft)
- Highest elevation: 383 m (1,257 ft)
- Lowest elevation: 162 m (531 ft)
- Population (2023): 9,371
  - Density: 801.6/km^{2} (2,076/sq mi)
- Time zone: UTC+01:00 (CET)
  - Summer (DST): UTC+02:00 (CEST)
- INSEE/Postal code: 57591 /57120
- ^{1} French Land Register data, which excludes lakes, ponds, glaciers > 1 km^{2} (0.386 sq mi or 247 acres) and river estuaries.

Rombas (French pronunciation: [ʁɔ̃bɑ]; German: Rombach; Lorrain: Rombéch) is a commune in the Moselle department in Grand Est in north-eastern France.

== Geography ==
Rombas is located in the lower Orne Valley, near Metz and Thionville.

== History ==
- The first human settlements date back to the Upper Paleolithic (-15,000 BP) on the site called Les Roches.
- Discovery in 1870 at the site called La tuilerie de Ramonville of Neolithic axes (-4,000 BP)
- The Germanic frank Rumo founded Rombas in the 5th century.
- The town went through several name changes over the course of history, it has been named Romesbach in 972, Romabach in 984, Rumesbach in 1128, Ramisbach in 1160–1162, Romesbas in 1185, Romebac in 1245, Romebair in 1247, Roumebac in 1280, Rombair in 1335–1338, Rombas in the 15th century, Rombach from 1870 to 1918 while absorbed by Germany; and finally Rombas from 1918.

== Population ==
Historical population

Year	Pop.	±% p.a.
1793	996	—
1800	1,027	+0.44%
1806	1,069	+0.67%
1821	1,097	+0.17%
1836	1,166	+0.41%
1841	1,184	+0.31%
1861	1,214	+0.13%
1866	1,348	+2.12%
1871	1,298	−0.75%
1875	1,310	+0.23%
1880	1,318	+0.12%
1885	1,402	+1.24%
1890	2,002	+7.38%
1895	2,345	+3.21%
1900	4,034	+11.46%
1905	5,230	+5.33%
1910	6,247	+3.62%

Year	Pop.	±% p.a.
1921	6,200	−0.07%
1926	6,495	+0.93%
1931	7,056	+1.67%
1936	6,459	−1.75%
1946	6,358	−0.16%
1954	6,893	+1.02%
1962	10,492	+5.39%
1968	12,412	+2.84%
1975	13,303	+1.00%
1982	11,733	−1.78%
1990	10,844	−0.98%
1999	10,743	−0.10%
2007	10,061	−0.82%
2012	9,975	−0.17%
2017	9,882	−0.19%
2023	9,371	−0.88%

Source: EHESS and INSEE (1968–2023)

== Sights ==
- The Drince tower, located on the edge of Pierrevillers, it overlooks Rombas at its highest elevation, between Metz and Thionville.
- The Fond Saint-Martin and Les Roches.
- The old church, demolished in 1755, was heavily fortified.
- The St Remy church, 1756, was replaced in 1938 by a modern church. Sculpture : Christ de Pitie from 16th century.

== Notable people from Rombas ==
- Mireille Guiliano, French-American author, born in Moyeuvre-Grande, 1946.
- Marie Hackin, archaeologist and French Resistance member, born in Rombas, 1905.

== Bibliography ==
- Jean-Jacques Sitek, Rombas, mémoire de la Vallée de l'Orne, 1993.
- Jean-Jacques Sitek, Rombas, Hier et Aujourd'hui, 1999.

== Notes & references ==
- Translated from the French Wikipedia article 12 June 2008 (UTC)
