= Ornes, Meuse =

Ornes
- Commune
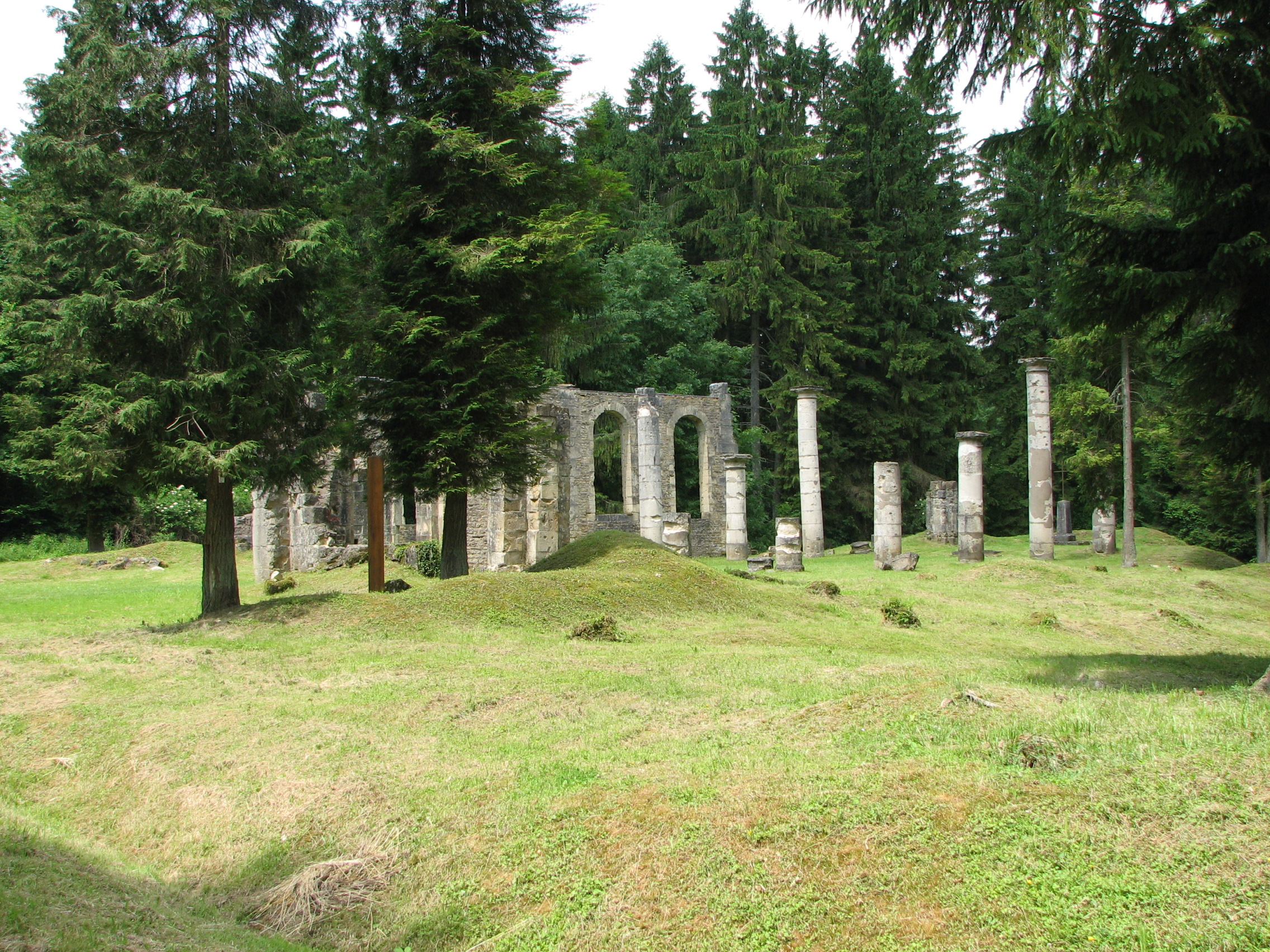
- Ruins of the Ornes church

- Coat of arms
- Location of Ornes
- Location within France Location within Grand Est
- Coordinates: 49°15′13″N 5°28′21″E
- Country: France
- Region: Grand Est
- Department: Meuse
- Arrondissement: Verdun
- Canton: Belleville-sur-Meuse
- Intercommunality: CA Grand Verdun

Government
  - Mayor (2020–2026): Charles Saint-Vanne
- Area^{1}: 18.52 km^{2} (7.15 sq mi)
- Elevation: 250 m (820 ft)
- Highest elevation: 327 m (1,073 ft)
- Lowest elevation: 209 m (686 ft)
- Population (2023): 9
  - Density: 0.49/km^{2} (1.3/sq mi)
- Time zone: UTC+01:00 (CET)
  - Summer (DST): UTC+02:00 (CEST)
- INSEE/Postal code: 55394 /55150
- ^{1} French Land Register data, which excludes lakes, ponds, glaciers > 1 km^{2} (0.386 sq mi or 247 acres) and river estuaries.

Ornes (French pronunciation: [ɔʁn]) is a commune in the Meuse department in Grand Est in north-eastern France. The village is one of the nine French villages destroyed in the First World War and one of the three villages that was rebuilt. It is now a memorial place.

Even though a few houses and a handful of permanent residents remain, the village is classified as having "died for France".

== Population ==
Historical population
Year	Pop.	±% p.a.
1968	6	—
1975	2	−14.52%
1982	1	−9.43%
1990	10	+33.35%
1999	6	−5.52%
2007	2	−12.83%
2012	6	+24.57%
2017	5	−3.58%
2023	9	+10.29%
Source: INSEE

== Geography ==
Ornes is located on departmental road 24, about 12 km to the north-east of Verdun. The source of the Orne river is in the commune.

The village is on the border of the Verdun forest where thousands of shells fell during World War I.

== See also ==
- Zone rouge (First World War)
- List of French villages destroyed in World War I
- Communes of the Meuse department
