= Clouange =

- Commune
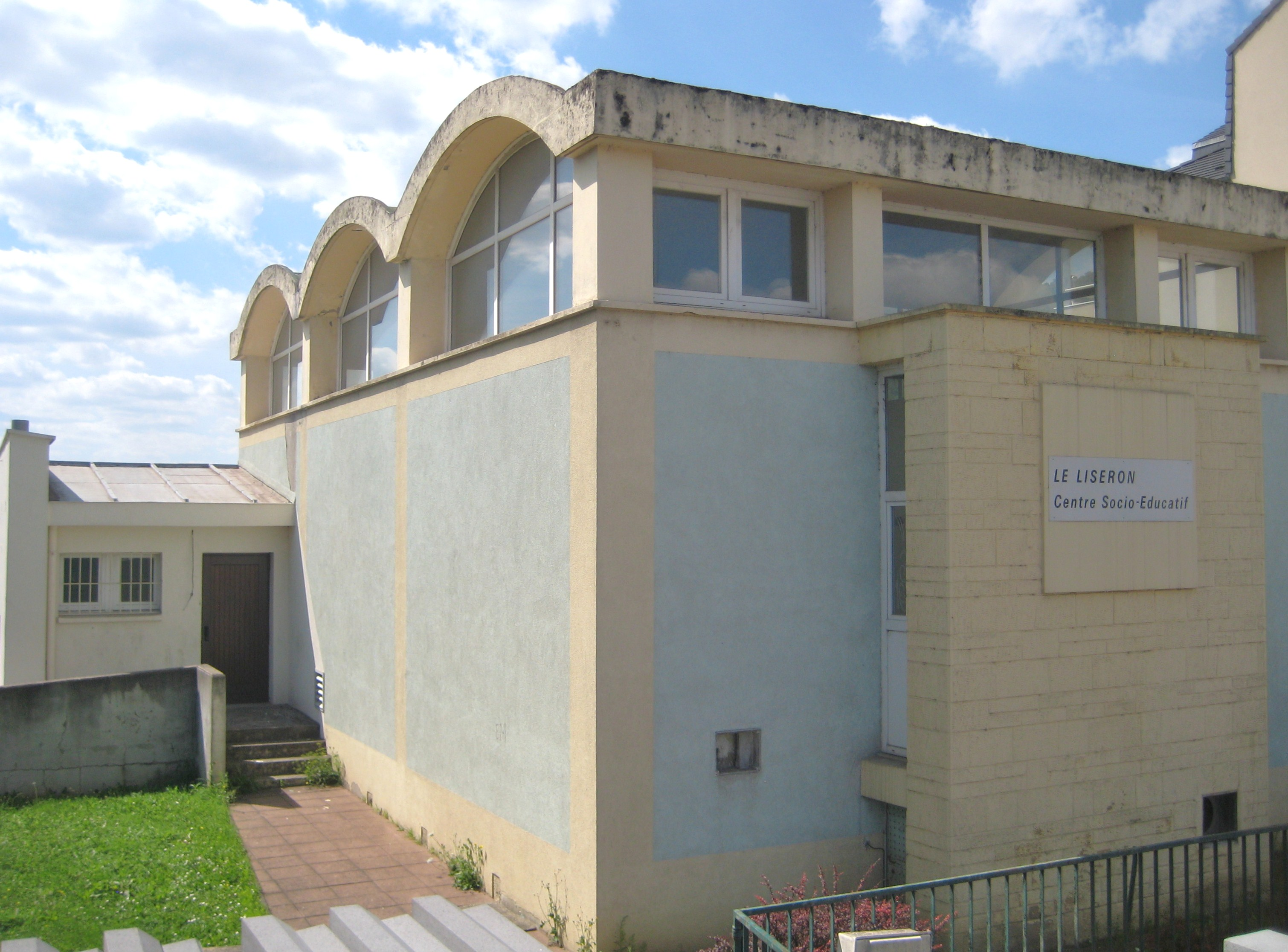
- The old Clouange synagogue

- Coat of arms
- Location of Clouange
- Location within France Location within Grand Est
- Coordinates: 49°15′45″N 6°05′52″E
- Country: France
- Region: Grand Est
- Department: Moselle
- Arrondissement: Thionville
- Canton: Hayange
- Intercommunality: CC du Pays Orne Moselle

Government
  - Mayor (2020–2026): Stéphane Boltz
- Area^{1}: 3.01 km^{2} (1.16 sq mi)
- Elevation: 200 m (660 ft)
- Highest elevation: 327 m (1,073 ft)
- Lowest elevation: 164 m (538 ft)
- Population (2023): 3,824
  - Density: 1,270/km^{2} (3,290/sq mi)
- Time zone: UTC+01:00 (CET)
  - Summer (DST): UTC+02:00 (CEST)
- INSEE/Postal code: 57143 /57185
- ^{1} French Land Register data, which excludes lakes, ponds, glaciers > 1 km^{2} (0.386 sq mi or 247 acres) and river estuaries.

Clouange (French pronunciation: [kluɑ̃ʒ]; German: Kluingen; Lorraine Franconian: Kluéngen) is a commune in the Moselle department in Grand Est in north-eastern France.

== Population ==
Historical population
Year	Pop.	±% p.a.
1968	4,678	—
1975	4,120	−1.80%
1982	4,321	+0.68%
1990	3,713	−1.88%
1999	3,643	−0.21%
2007	3,875	+0.77%
2012	3,834	−0.21%
2017	3,495	−1.83%
2023	3,824	+1.51%
Source: INSEE

== See also ==
- Communes of the Moselle department
