= Moyeuvre-Petite =

- Commune
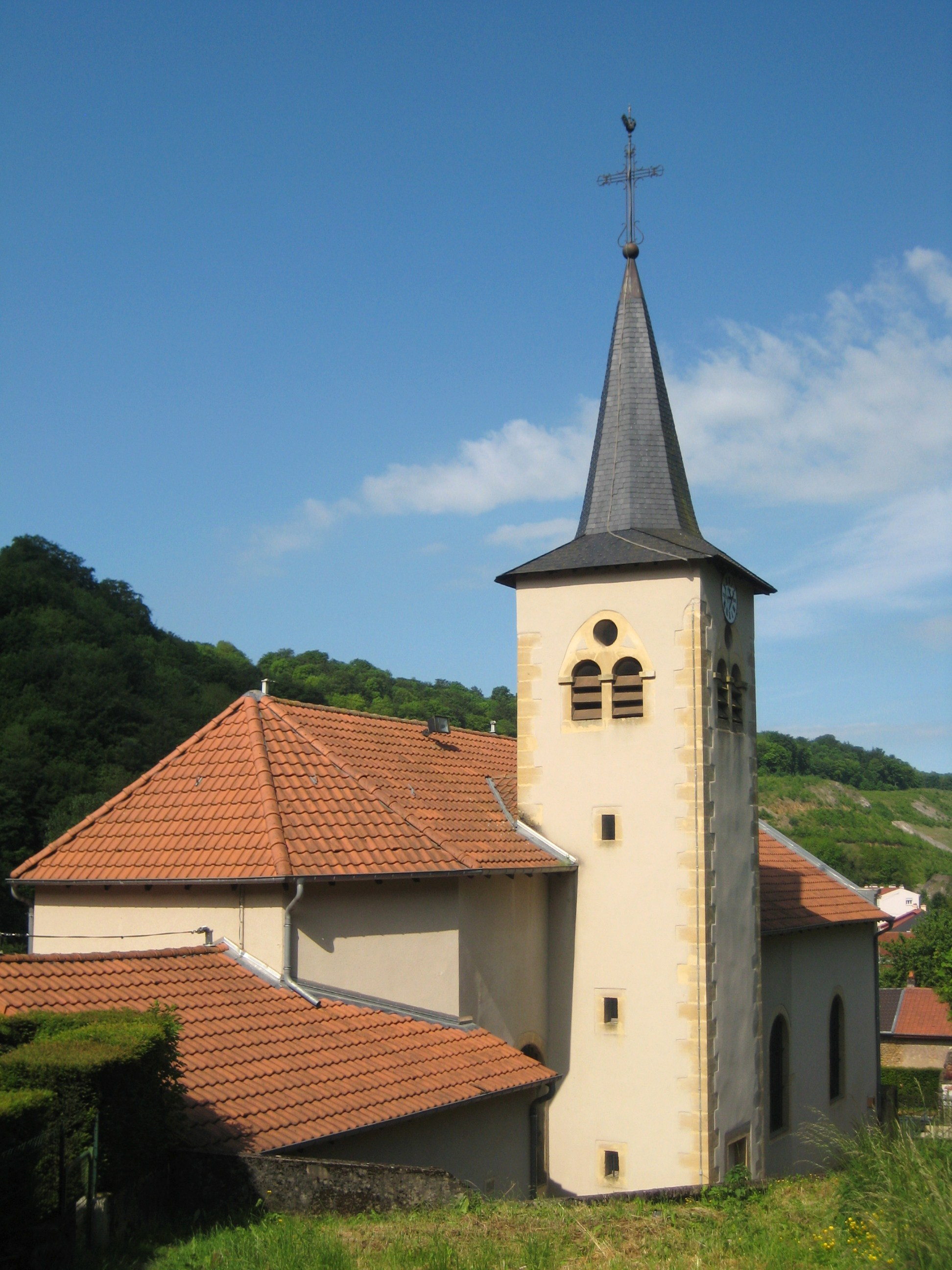
- The church in Moyeuvre-Petite

- Coat of arms
- Location of Moyeuvre-Petite
- Location within France Location within Grand Est
- Coordinates: 49°16′12″N 6°01′32″E
- Country: France
- Region: Grand Est
- Department: Moselle
- Arrondissement: Thionville
- Canton: Hayange
- Intercommunality: CC du Pays Orne Moselle

Government
  - Mayor (2020–2026): Christian Schweizer
- Area^{1}: 5.43 km^{2} (2.10 sq mi)
- Elevation: 250 m (820 ft)
- Highest elevation: 322 m (1,056 ft)
- Lowest elevation: 185 m (607 ft)
- Population (2023): 442
  - Density: 81.4/km^{2} (211/sq mi)
- Time zone: UTC+01:00 (CET)
  - Summer (DST): UTC+02:00 (CEST)
- INSEE/Postal code: 57492 /57250
- ^{1} French Land Register data, which excludes lakes, ponds, glaciers > 1 km^{2} (0.386 sq mi or 247 acres) and river estuaries.

Moyeuvre-Petite (French pronunciation: [mwajœvʁ pətit]; German: Kleinmövern) is a commune in the Moselle department in Grand Est in north-eastern France.

== See also ==
- Communes of the Moselle department
