= Hannonville-sous-les-Côtes =

- Commune
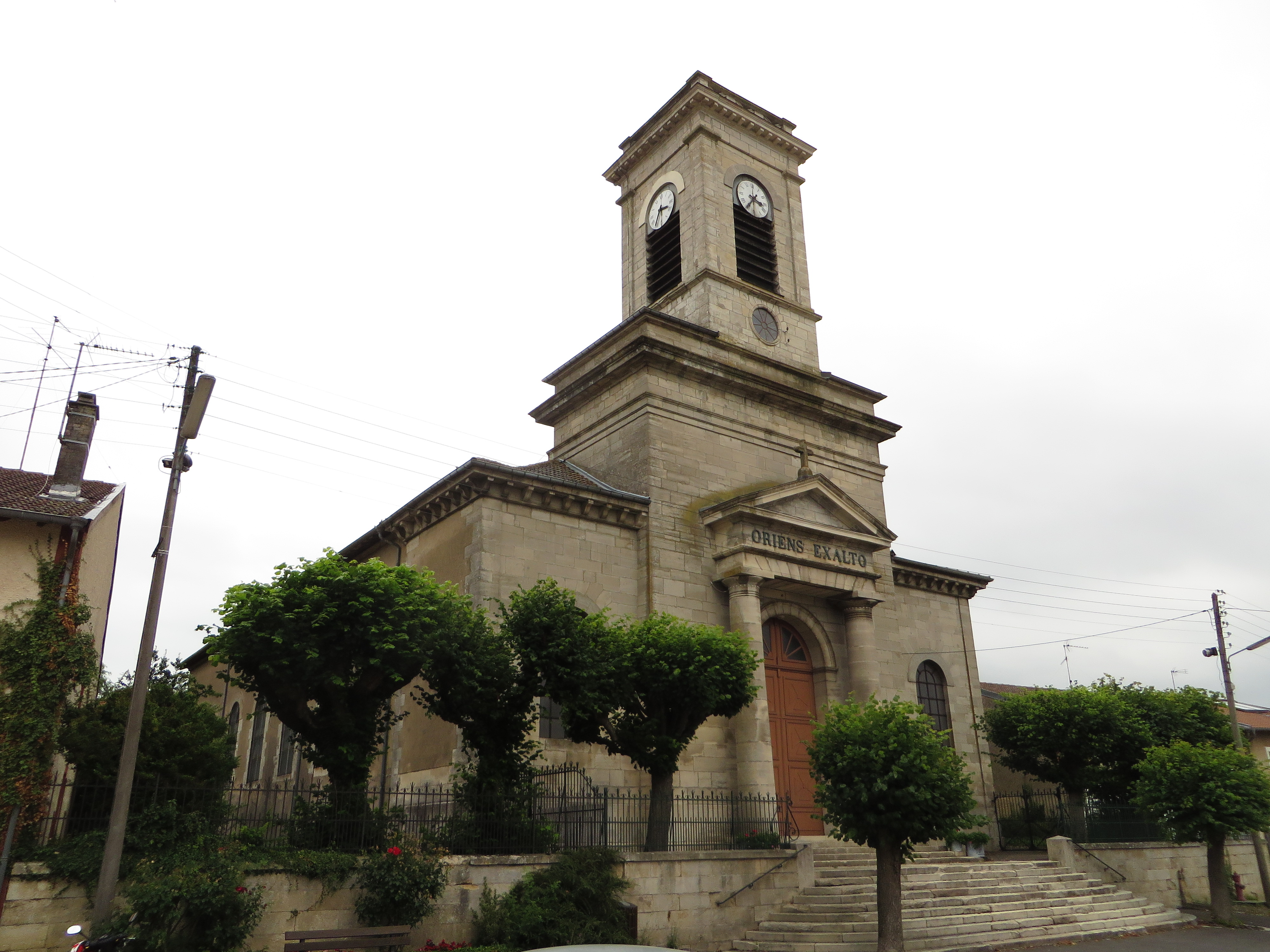
- The church in Hannonville-sous-les-Côtes

- Coat of arms
- Location of Hannonville-sous-les-Côtes
- Location within France Location within Grand Est
- Coordinates: 49°02′27″N 5°39′33″E
- Country: France
- Region: Grand Est
- Department: Meuse
- Arrondissement: Verdun
- Canton: Étain
- Intercommunality: Territoire de Fresnes-en-Woëvre

Government
  - Mayor (2020–2026): Danielle Leprince
- Area^{1}: 15.71 km^{2} (6.07 sq mi)
- Elevation: 241 m (791 ft)
- Highest elevation: 401 m (1,316 ft)
- Lowest elevation: 214 m (702 ft)
- Population (2023): 556
  - Density: 35.4/km^{2} (91.7/sq mi)
- Time zone: UTC+01:00 (CET)
  - Summer (DST): UTC+02:00 (CEST)
- INSEE/Postal code: 55228 /55210
- ^{1} French Land Register data, which excludes lakes, ponds, glaciers > 1 km^{2} (0.386 sq mi or 247 acres) and river estuaries.

Hannonville-sous-les-Côtes (French pronunciation: [anɔ̃vil su le kot]) is a commune in the Meuse department in Grand Est in north-eastern France.

== See also ==
- Communes of the Meuse department
- Parc naturel régional de Lorraine
