= Rosselange =

- Commune
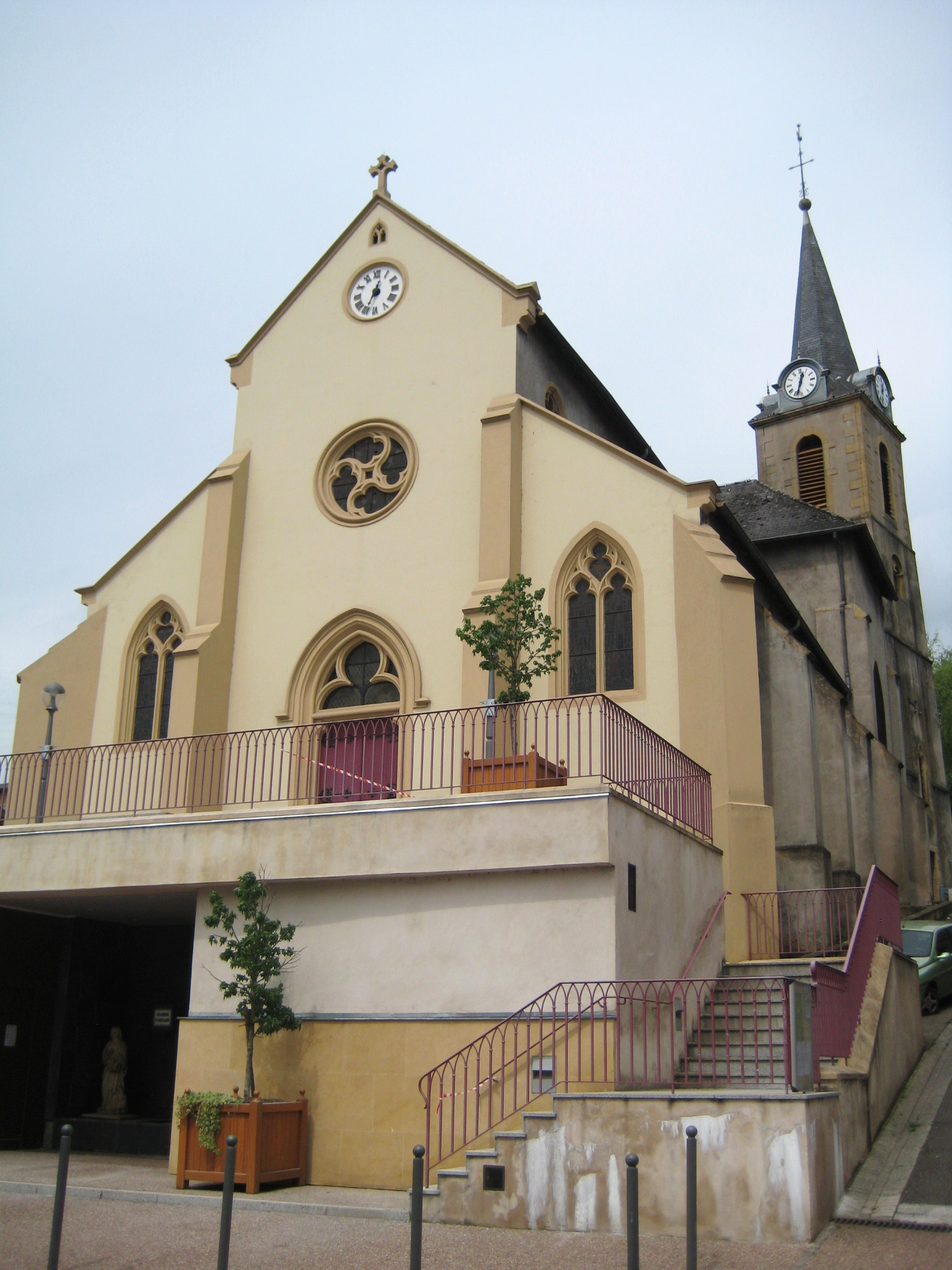
- The church in Rosselange

- Coat of arms
- Location of Rosselange
- Location within France Location within Grand Est
- Coordinates: 49°15′33″N 6°04′12″E
- Country: France
- Region: Grand Est
- Department: Moselle
- Arrondissement: Thionville
- Canton: Hayange
- Intercommunality: Pays Orne-Moselle

Government
  - Mayor (2020–2026): Vincent Matélic
- Area^{1}: 5.35 km^{2} (2.07 sq mi)
- Elevation: 160 m (520 ft)
- Highest elevation: 331 m (1,086 ft)
- Lowest elevation: 164 m (538 ft)
- Population (2023): 2,384
  - Density: 446/km^{2} (1,150/sq mi)
- Time zone: UTC+01:00 (CET)
  - Summer (DST): UTC+02:00 (CEST)
- INSEE/Postal code: 57597 /57780
- ^{1} French Land Register data, which excludes lakes, ponds, glaciers > 1 km^{2} (0.386 sq mi or 247 acres) and river estuaries.

Rosselange (French pronunciation: [ʁɔslɑ̃ʒ]; German: Rosslingen; Lorraine Franconian: Rossléngen/Rosléngen) is a commune in the Moselle department in Grand Est in north-eastern France.

== Population ==
Historical population
Year	Pop.	±% p.a.
1968	4,485	—
1975	3,923	−1.89%
1982	3,601	−1.22%
1990	3,242	−1.30%
1999	3,101	−0.49%
2007	2,980	−0.50%
2012	2,887	−0.63%
2017	2,693	−1.38%
2023	2,384	−2.01%
Source: INSEE

== See also ==
- Communes of the Moselle department
