= Gandrange =

- Commune
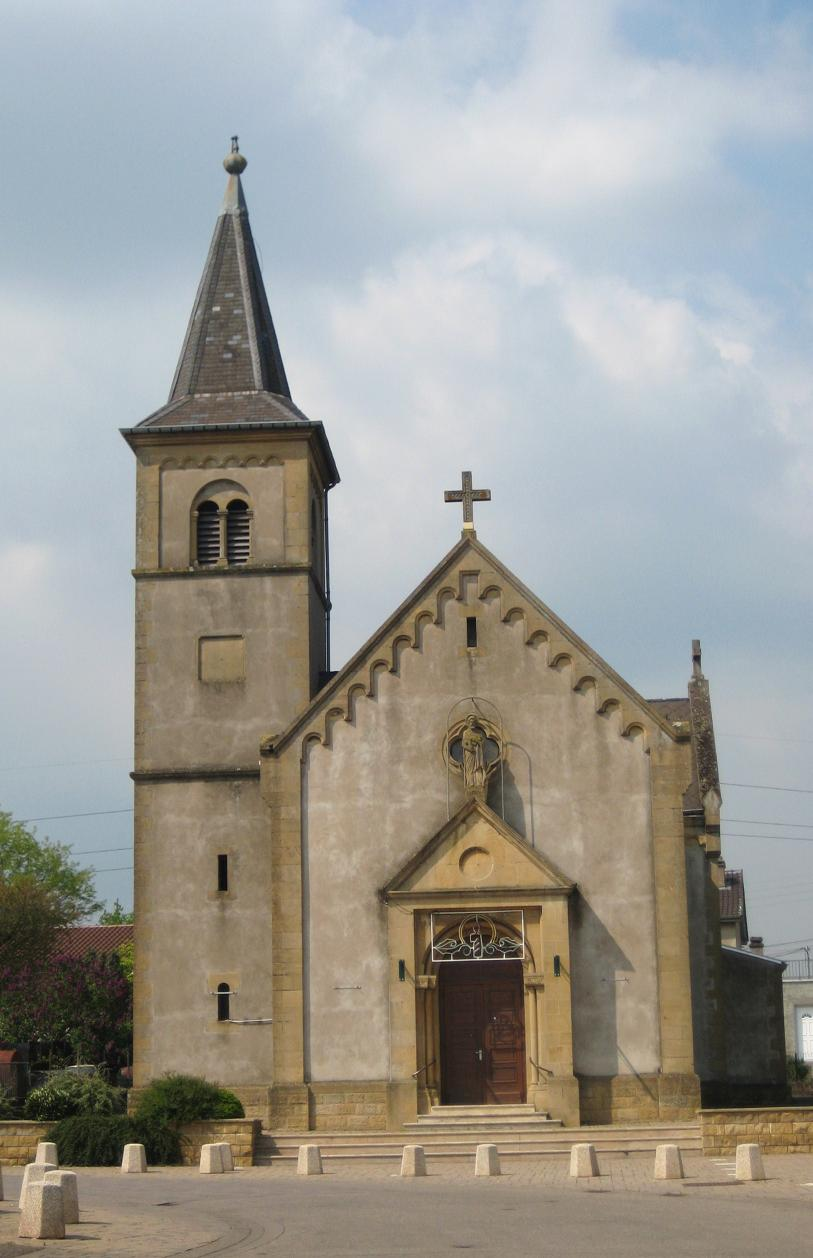
- New church Saint-Pierre of Boussange.

- Coat of arms
- Location of Gandrange
- Location within France Location within Grand Est
- Coordinates: 49°16′20″N 6°07′33″E
- Country: France
- Region: Grand Est
- Department: Moselle
- Arrondissement: Thionville
- Canton: Hayange
- Intercommunality: CC Rives de Moselle

Government
  - Mayor (2020–2026): Henri Octave
- Area^{1}: 4.08 km^{2} (1.58 sq mi)
- Elevation: 180 m (590 ft)
- Highest elevation: 224 m (735 ft)
- Lowest elevation: 154 m (505 ft)
- Population (2023): 3,031
  - Density: 743/km^{2} (1,920/sq mi)
- Time zone: UTC+01:00 (CET)
  - Summer (DST): UTC+02:00 (CEST)
- INSEE/Postal code: 57242 /57175
- ^{1} French Land Register data, which excludes lakes, ponds, glaciers > 1 km^{2} (0.386 sq mi or 247 acres) and river estuaries.

Gandrange (French pronunciation: [ɡɑ̃dʁɑ̃ʒ]; German: Gandringen) is a commune in the Moselle department in Grand Est in north-eastern France.

== Population ==
Historical population
Year	Pop.	±% p.a.
1968	2,706	—
1975	2,579	−0.68%
1982	2,296	−1.65%
1990	2,370	+0.40%
1999	2,542	+0.78%
2007	2,634	+0.45%
2012	2,886	+1.84%
2017	2,907	+0.15%
2023	3,031	+0.70%
Source: INSEE

== See also ==
- Communes of the Moselle department
