= Limey-Remenauville =

- Commune
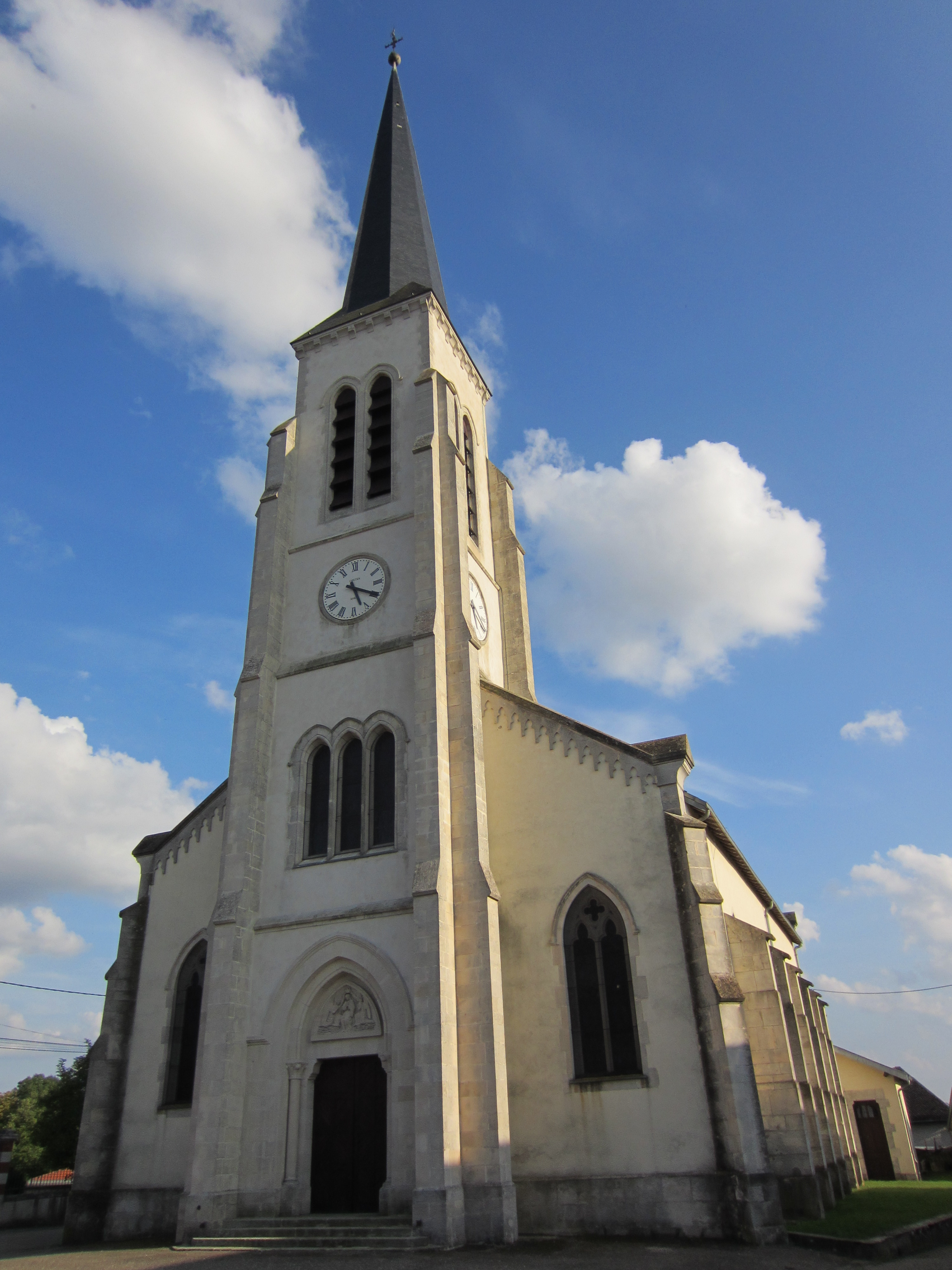
- "Nativité-de-la-Vierge" Church in Limey

- Coat of arms
- Location of Limey-Remenauville
- Location within France Location within Grand Est
- Coordinates: 48°53′13″N 5°53′45″E
- Country: France
- Region: Grand Est
- Department: Meurthe-et-Moselle
- Arrondissement: Toul
- Canton: Le Nord-Toulois
- Intercommunality: Mad et Moselle

Government
  - Mayor (2020–2026): Éliane Dubois
- Area^{1}: 18.33 km^{2} (7.08 sq mi)
- Elevation: 295 m (968 ft)
- Highest elevation: 340 m (1,120 ft)
- Lowest elevation: 235 m (771 ft)
- Population (2023): 317
  - Density: 17.3/km^{2} (44.8/sq mi)
- Time zone: UTC+01:00 (CET)
  - Summer (DST): UTC+02:00 (CEST)
- INSEE/Postal code: 54316 /54470
- ^{1} French Land Register data, which excludes lakes, ponds, glaciers > 1 km^{2} (0.386 sq mi or 247 acres) and river estuaries.

Limey-Remenauville is a commune in the Meurthe-et-Moselle department in north-eastern France.

== History ==
The origin of the name "Limey" is said to come from the Celtic word "lemos" meaning "elm [tree]". This particular tree was previously common in the area but has since disappeared.

The town has several memorials from the First World War. Remenauville is a former commune, whose village was totally destroyed during the First World War. Never rebuilt, it was attached to Limey in 1942. In 1962 the name Remenauville was added to that of Limey to form "Limey-Remenauville".

== See also ==
- Communes of the Meurthe-et-Moselle department
- Parc naturel régional de Lorraine
