= Conflans-en-Jarnisy =

- Commune
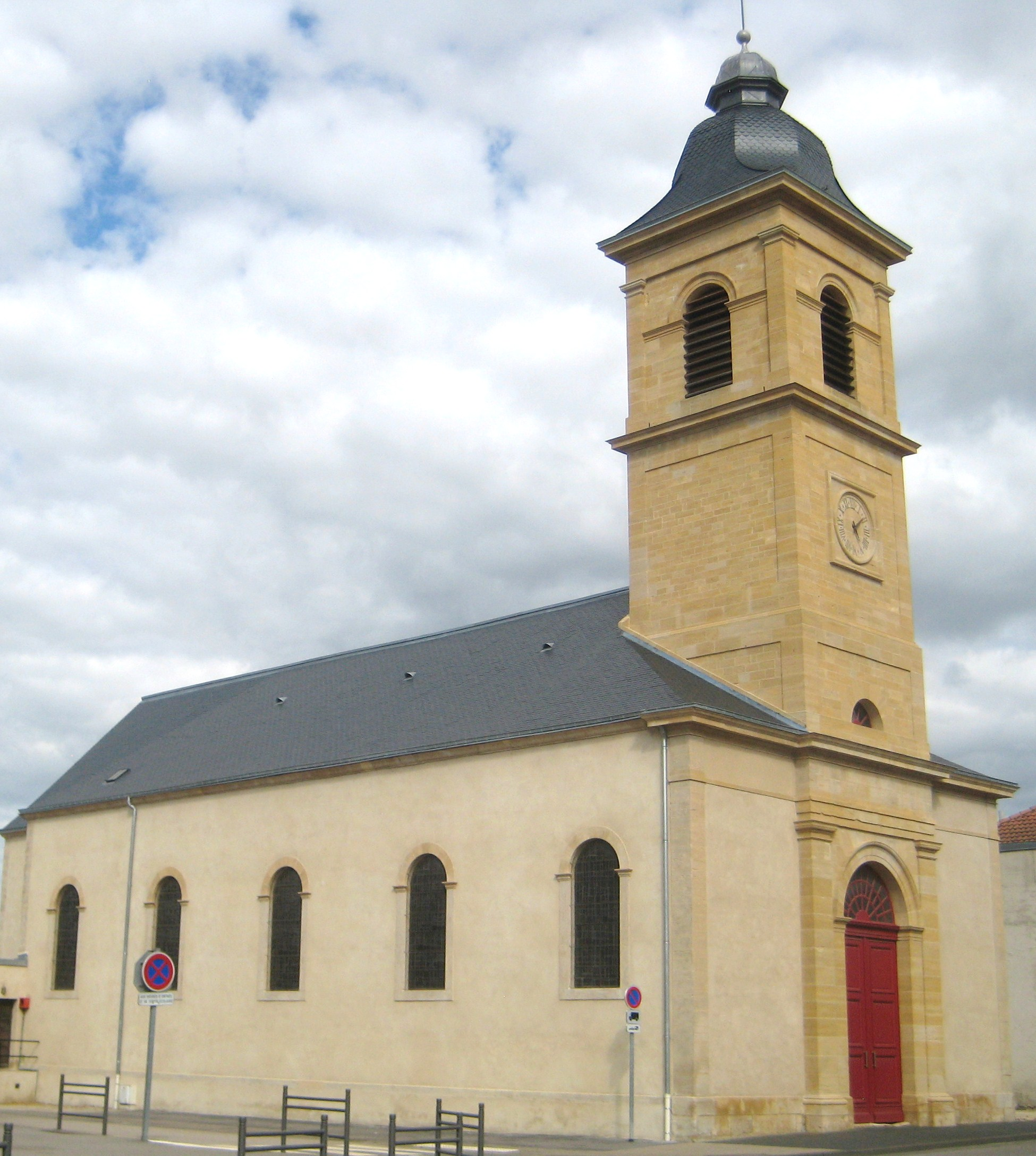
- The church in Conflans-en-Jarnisy

- Coat of arms
- Location of Conflans-en-Jarnisy
- Location within France Location within Grand Est
- Coordinates: 49°10′06″N 5°51′27″E
- Country: France
- Region: Grand Est
- Department: Meurthe-et-Moselle
- Arrondissement: Val-de-Briey
- Canton: Jarny
- Intercommunality: Orne Lorraine Confluences

Government
  - Mayor (2020–2026): Alain Lemey
- Area^{1}: 8.71 km^{2} (3.36 sq mi)
- Elevation: 191 m (627 ft)
- Highest elevation: 226 m (741 ft)
- Lowest elevation: 185 m (607 ft)
- Population (2023): 2,389
  - Density: 274/km^{2} (710/sq mi)
- Demonym: Conflanais
- Time zone: UTC+01:00 (CET)
  - Summer (DST): UTC+02:00 (CEST)
- INSEE/Postal code: 54136 /54800
- ^{1} French Land Register data, which excludes lakes, ponds, glaciers > 1 km^{2} (0.386 sq mi or 247 acres) and river estuaries.

Conflans-en-Jarnisy (French pronunciation: [kɔ̃flɑ̃ ɑ̃ ʒaʁnizi]) is a commune in the Meurthe-et-Moselle department in north-eastern France.

== Population ==
Historical population
Year	Pop.	±% p.a.
1968	2,850	—
1975	2,593	−1.34%
1982	2,890	+1.56%
1990	2,728	−0.72%
1999	2,502	−0.96%
2007	2,446	−0.28%
2012	2,388	−0.48%
2017	2,359	−0.24%
2023	2,389	+0.21%
Source: INSEE

== See also ==
- Communes of the Meurthe-et-Moselle department
