= Vigneulles-lès-Hattonchâtel =

- Commune
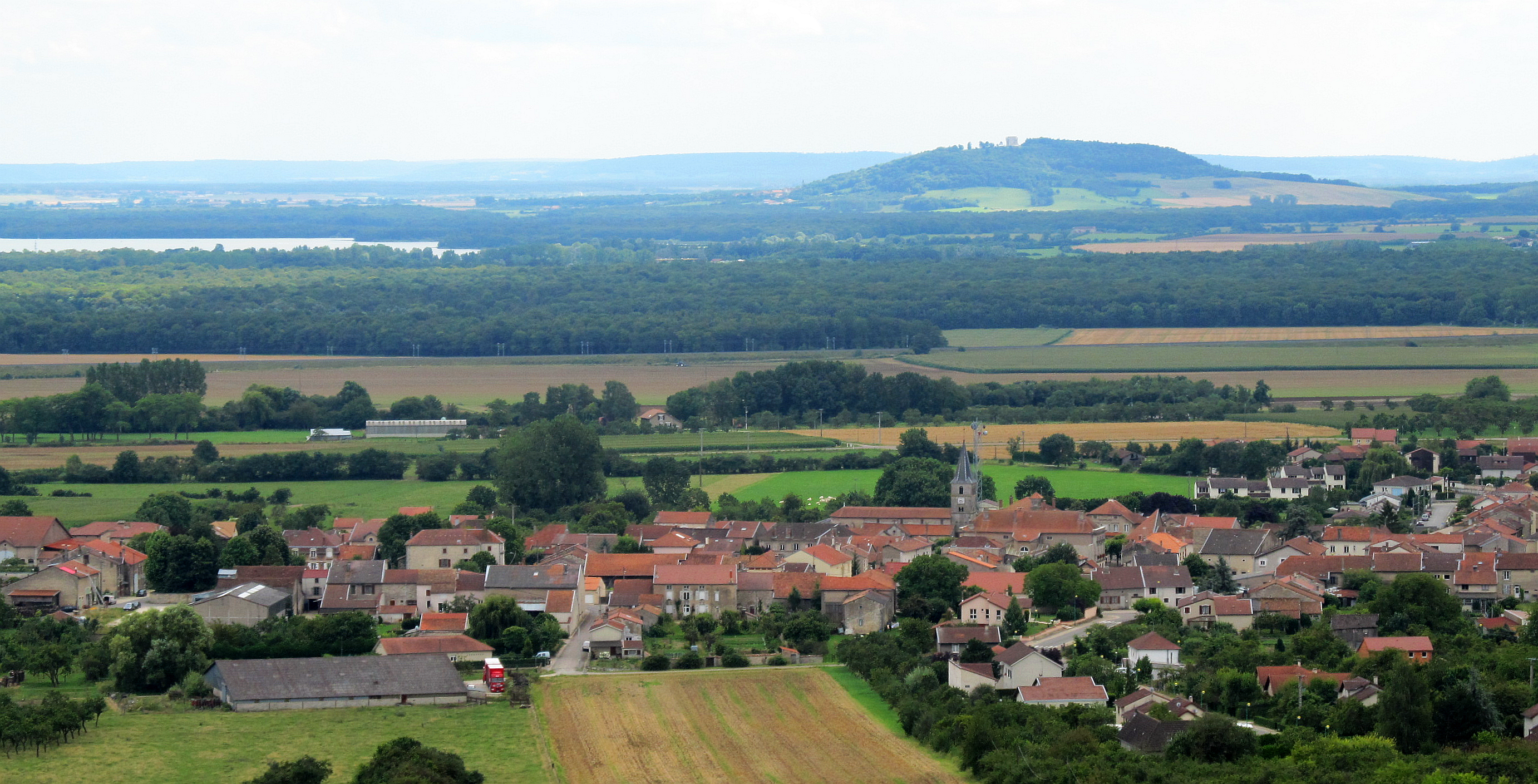
- Vigneulles from Hattonchâtel

- Coat of arms
- Location of Vigneulles-lès-Hattonchâtel
- Location within France Location within Grand Est
- Coordinates: 48°58′55″N 5°42′15″E
- Country: France
- Region: Grand Est
- Department: Meuse
- Arrondissement: Commercy
- Canton: Saint-Mihiel
- Intercommunality: Côtes de Meuse - Woëvre

Government
  - Mayor (2020–2026): Jean-Claude Zingerlé
- Area^{1}: 62.59 km^{2} (24.17 sq mi)
- Elevation: 259 m (850 ft)
- Highest elevation: 416 m (1,365 ft)
- Lowest elevation: 212 m (696 ft)
- Population (2023): 1,579
  - Density: 25.23/km^{2} (65.34/sq mi)
- Time zone: UTC+01:00 (CET)
  - Summer (DST): UTC+02:00 (CEST)
- INSEE/Postal code: 55551 /55210
- ^{1} French Land Register data, which excludes lakes, ponds, glaciers > 1 km^{2} (0.386 sq mi or 247 acres) and river estuaries.

Vigneulles-lès-Hattonchâtel (French pronunciation: [viɲœl le atɔ̃ʃatɛl], literally Vigneulles near Hattonchâtel) is a commune in the Meuse department in Grand Est in north-eastern France.

The former towns of Billy-sous-les-Côtes, Creuë, Hattonchâtel, Hattonville, Saint-Benoît-en-Woëvre, and Viéville-sous-les-Côtes were joined to Vigneulles-lès-Hattonchâtel on 1 March 1973.

== Gallery ==
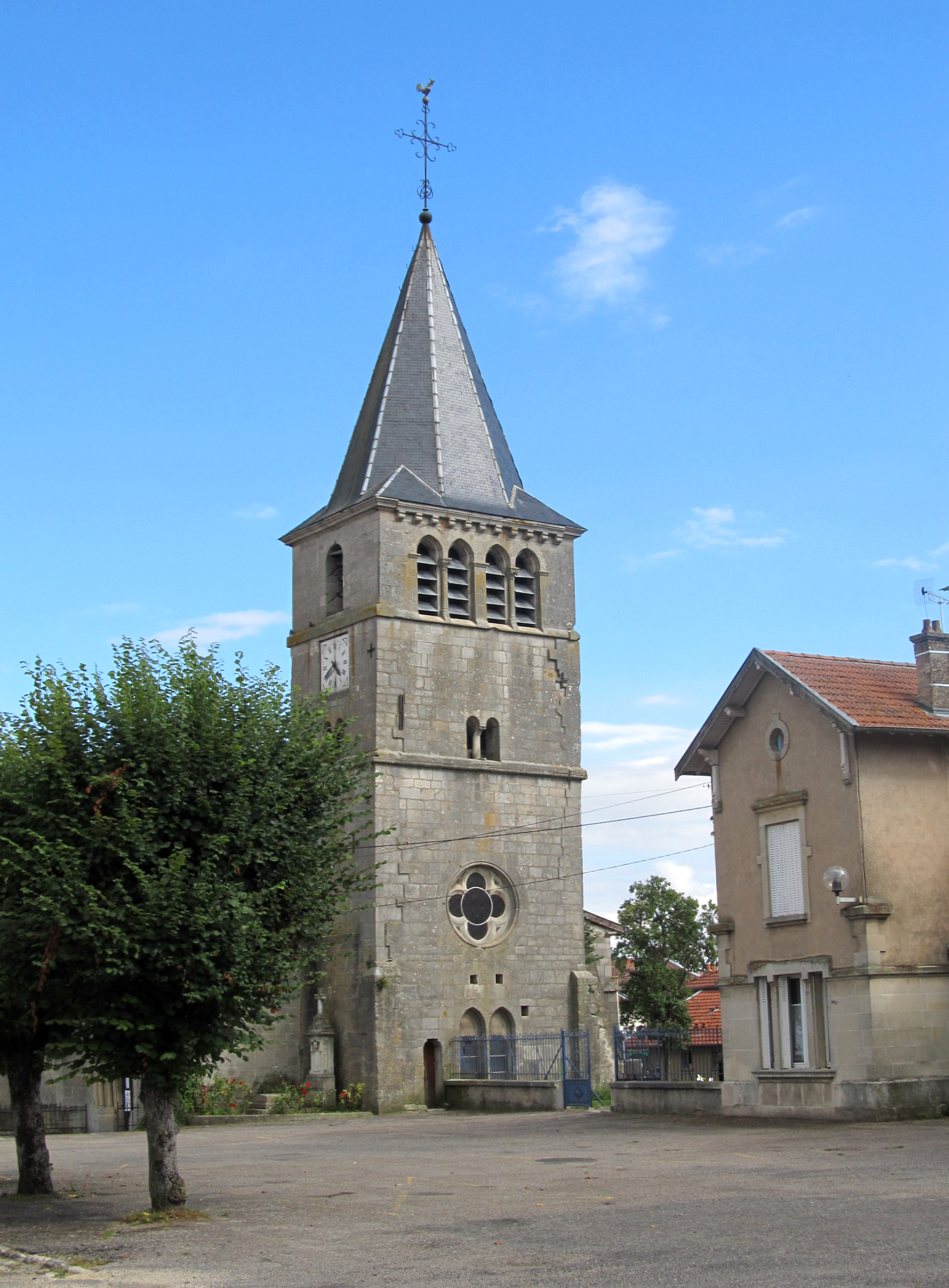
The bell tower of Vigneulles

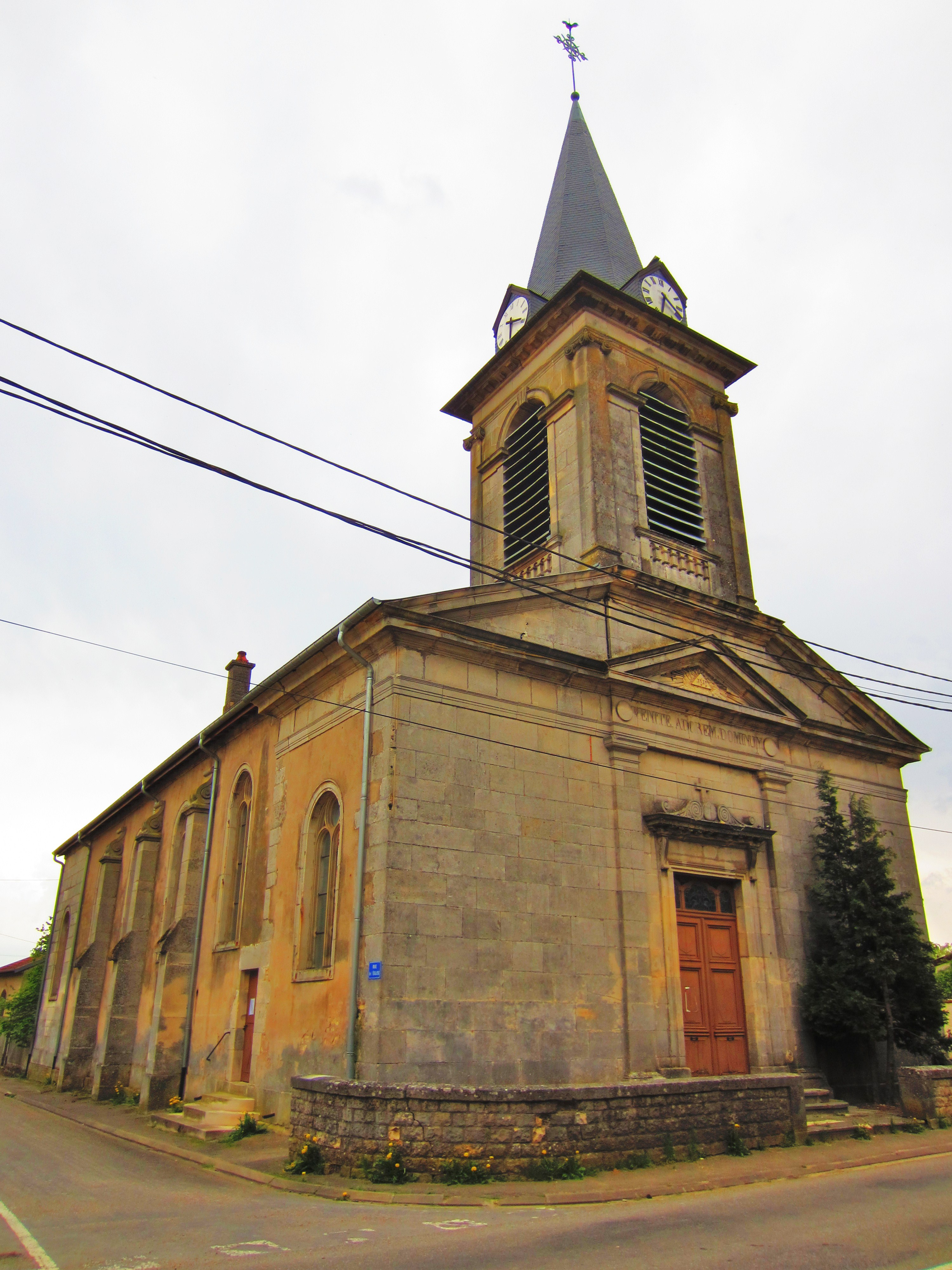
Saint-Sabastian church (Hattonville).

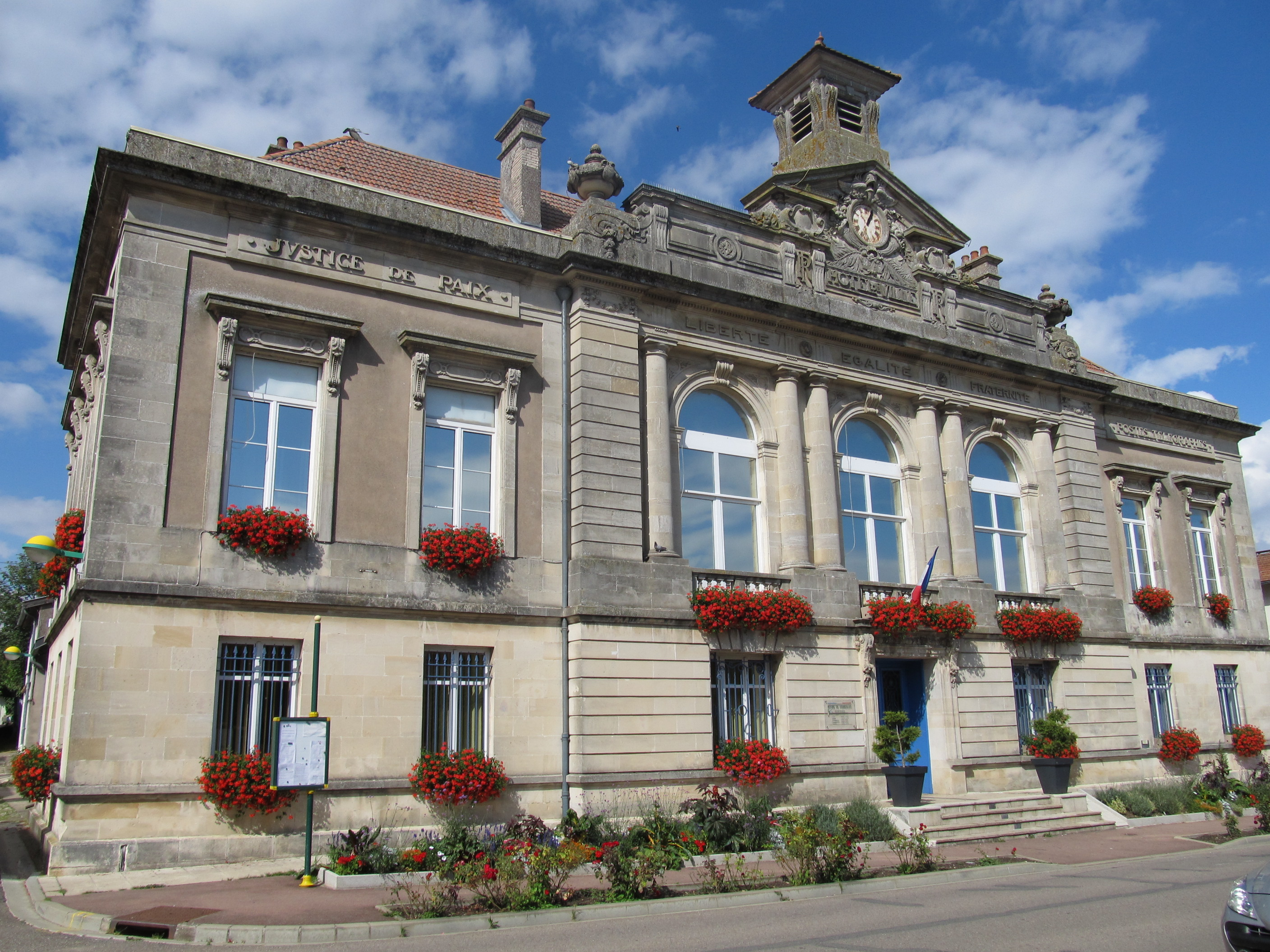
Town hall

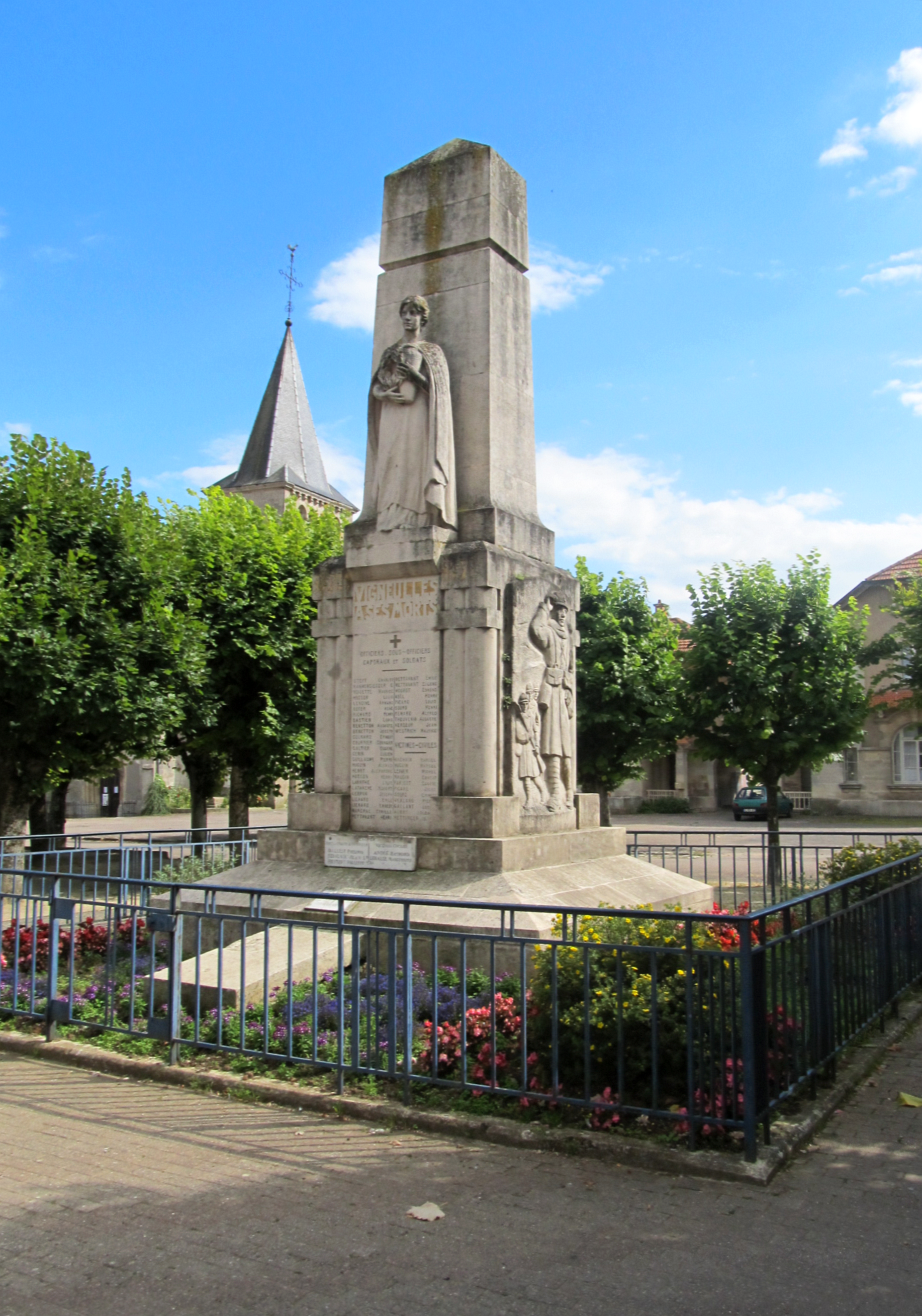
War memorial in Vigneulles

== See also ==
- Château de Hattonchâtel
- Communes of the Meuse department
- Parc naturel régional de Lorraine
