= 728th Airlift Squadron =

728th Airlift Squadron

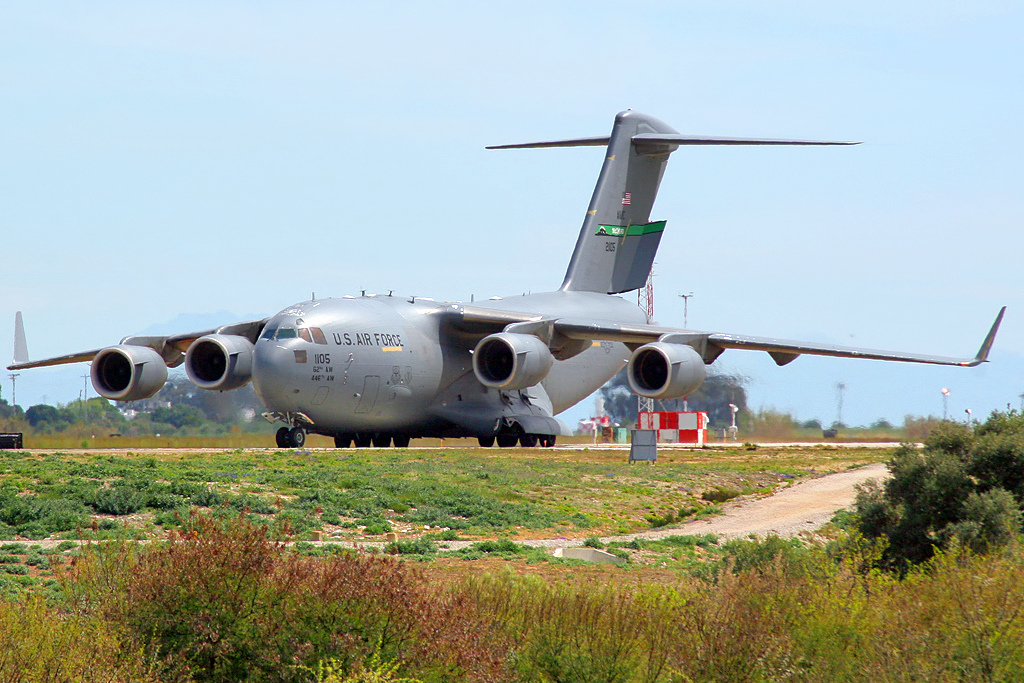
- 446th Airlift Wing C-17A Globemaster III (Note: Aircraft is Boeing C-17A Globemaster III, Lot XIV, serial 02-1105. From June to July 2003, this plane carried the civil registration N1105X. Baugher, Joe (19 May 2023). "2002 USAF Serial Numbers". Joe Baugher.)
- Active: 1943–1945; 1947–1952; 1952–present
- Country: United States
- Branch: United States Air Force
- Role: Airlift
- Part of: Air Force Reserve Command
- Garrison/HQ: McChord Air Force Base
- Nickname: Flying Knights
- Decorations: Distinguished Unit Citation; Air Force Meritorious Unit Award; Air Force Outstanding Unit Award; Republic of Korea Presidential Unit Citation; Republic of Vietnam Gallantry Cross with Palm

Commanders
- Current commander: Lt Col Roderick Morris

Insignia
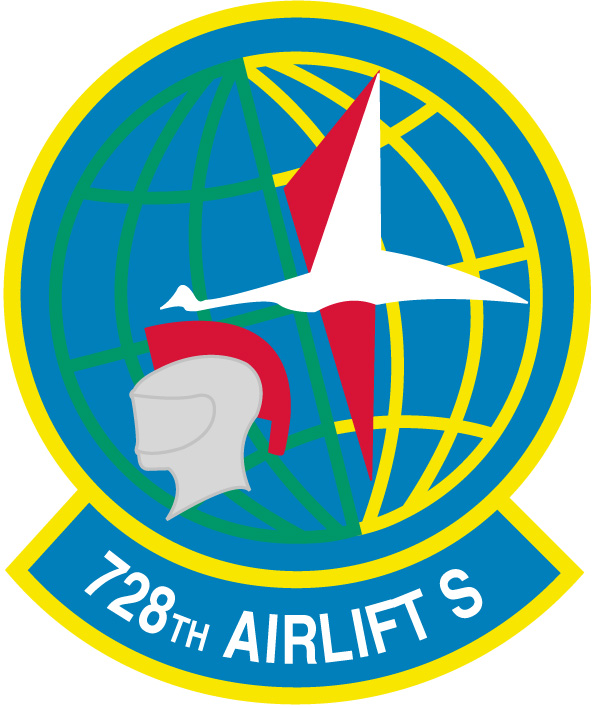
- 728th Airlift Squadron emblem (Note: Approved 12 December 1984)

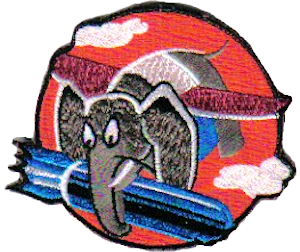
- 728th Bombardment Squadron emblem (Note: Approved 18 January 1944. Description: Over and through a yellow orange disc, a caricatured gray elephant with red aircraft wings, edged white, strapped about the middle with wide white band, holding a large light turquoise blue aerial bomb bendwise in the trunk, all between two small white cloud formations in sinister base and dexter chief respectively.)
- World War II fuselage code (Note: The squadron did not use this code until the end of the war, although it had been assigned earlier. Instead, the squadron's aircraft only carried the individual aircraft letter. Freeman, p. 289.): 9Z

The 728th Airlift Squadron is a United States Air Force Reserve squadron, assigned to the 446th Operations Group, stationed at McChord AFB, Joint Base Lewis-McChord, Washington. It is an associate unit of the active duty 8th Airlift Squadron of the 62d Airlift Wing.

The squadron was first activated as the 728th Bombardment Squadron in 1943. After training in the United States with the Boeing B-17 Flying Fortress, the squadron deployed to the European Theater of Operations, participating in the strategic bombing campaign against Germany. It earned a Distinguished Unit Citation (DUC) during an attack on a German jet fighter base near Kaltenkirchen in April 1945. Following V-E Day, the squadron returned to the United States and was inactivated.

The squadron was activated again in the reserves in 1947. Two years later, it began to train with Douglas B-26 Invaders. In August 1950, the squadron was one of the first reserve units mobilized for the Korean War. After filling its ranks and undergoing intensive training, the squadron deployed to Far East Air Forces and began flying combat missions. It was awarded two additional DUCs for its operations in Korea. In May 1952, the squadron was inactivated and its personnel and equipment were transferred to a regular unit that was simultaneously activated.

The squadron was activated in the reserves again two months later as the 728th Tactical Reconnaissance Squadron. It returned to the light bomber mission in 1955, but the Air Force's reserve units were converting to the airlift mission, and the squadron became the 728th Troop Carrier Squadron in July 1957, and has served in tactical and strategic airlift roles since then.

== Mission ==
The mission of the 728th is to provide mission-ready aircrews for operational support for strategic and tactical airlift, combat airdrop and aeromedical evacuation in support of U.S. Air Force, Air Force Reserve Command and gaining major command objectives.

== History ==
=== World War II ===
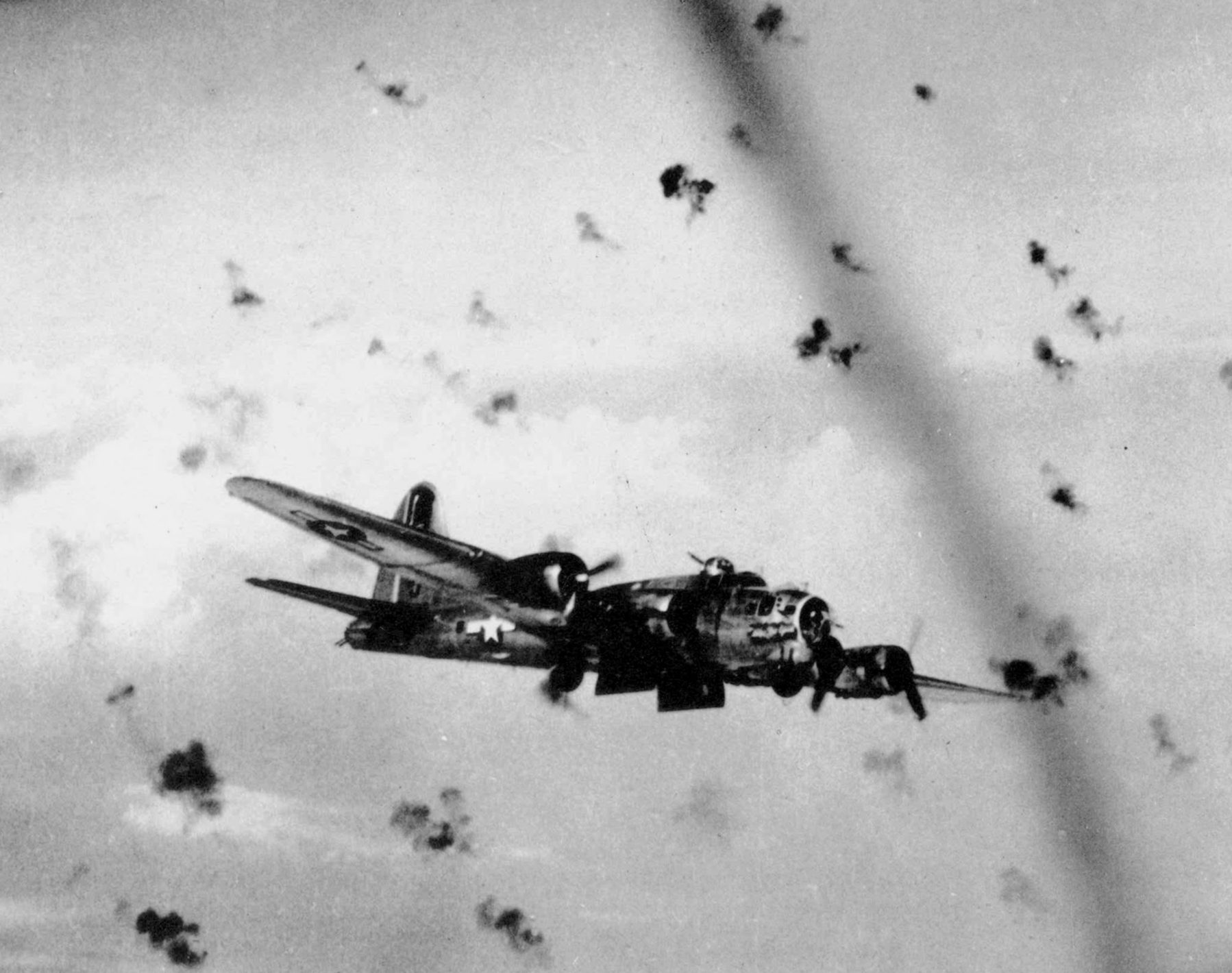
B-17G (43-37563, «Lady Be Good») of the 452nd Bomb Group 728th Bomb Squadron passing through flak fire.

The squadron was first activated in June 1943 at Geiger Field, Washington, as one of the four original squadrons of the 452d Bombardment Group. Later that month, it moved to Rapid City Army Air Base, South Dakota and began to train with the Boeing B-17 Flying Fortress. It continued training with Second Air Force until December, when it began its movement to the European Theater of Operations. The ground echelon staged through Camp Shanks and sailed on the RMS Queen Elizabeth on 2 January 1944. The air echelon deployed via the South Atlantic air ferry route in World War II

The squadron established itself at RAF Deopham Green in January 1944, and began operations on 4 February 1944 with a strike on an aircraft assembly plant near Brunswick. Its strategic targets included railroad marshalling yards near Frankfurt, aircraft factories near Regensberg and Kassel. the ball bearing factory at Schweinfurt and an oil refinery near Bohlen. In September 1944, the squadron participated in the third shuttle mission, striking Chemnitz before landing in bases in the Soviet Union.

The 728th was occasionally diverted to support tactical operations. It hit airfields, V-weapon launching sites, bridges and other objectives in preparations for Operation Overlord, the invasion of Normandy. It bombed enemy positions to support Operation Cobra, the breakout at Saint Lo in July 1944 and the attacks on Brest, France in August. It supported Operation Market Garden, airborne attacks in the Netherlands in September and, during the Battle of the Bulge, struck German lines of communication. It struck an airfield to support Operation Varsity, the airborne assault across the Rhine.

Shortly before the end of the war, on 7 April, the squadron struck the jet fighter base at Kaltenkirchen, pressing the attack despite strong fighter opposition, earning a Distinguished Unit Citation. It flew its last mission of the war on 21 April against marshalling yards at Ingolstadt.

After V-E Day, in August 1945, the squadron returned to the United States (the ground echelon once again sailed on the RMS Queen Elizabeth) and was inactivated at Sioux Falls Army Air Field, South Dakota.

=== Reserve duty and Korean War call-up ===
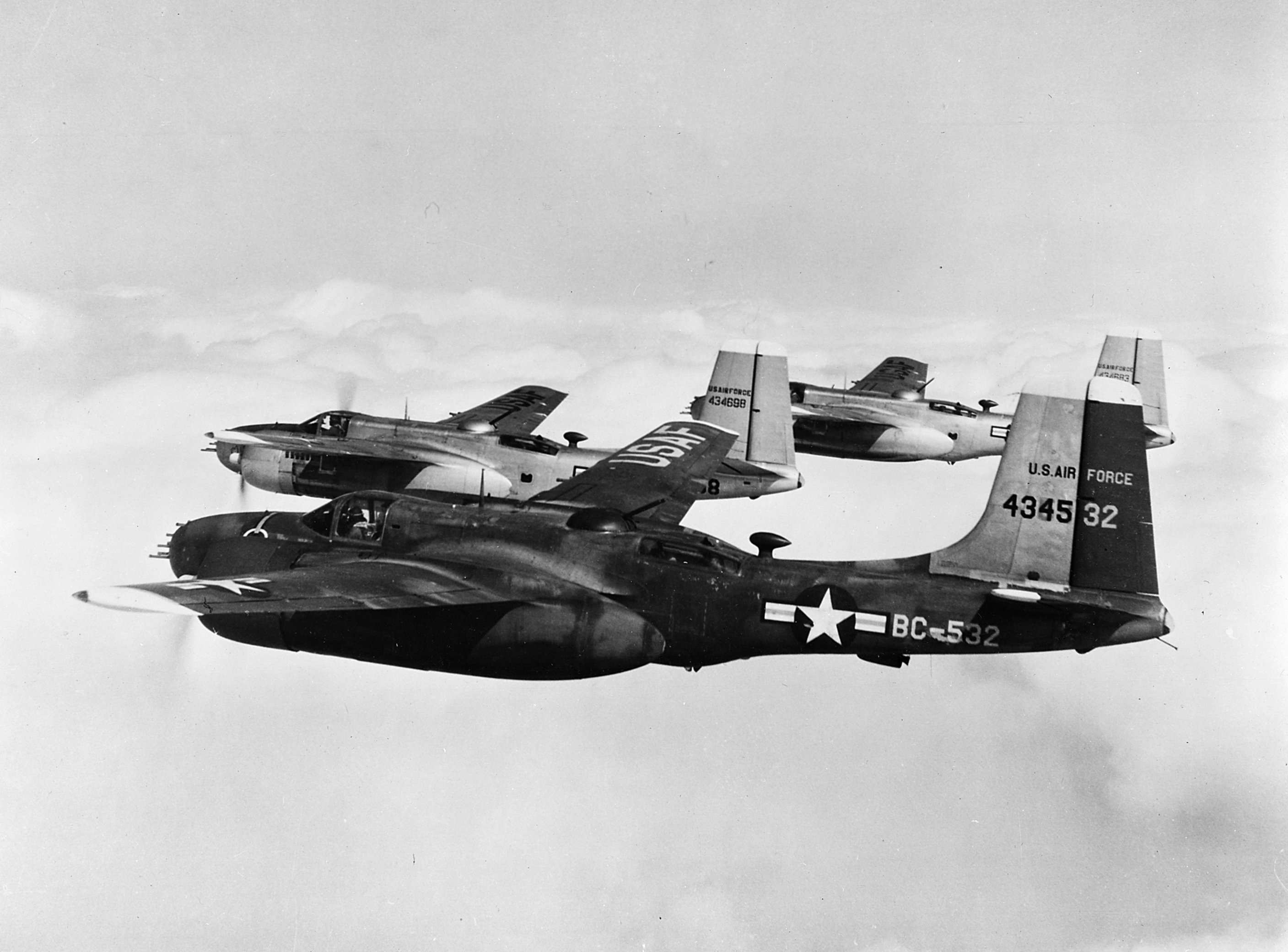
B-26Bs of the 452d Bomb Wing in Korea

The squadron was reactivated in the reserve at Long Beach Army Air Field, California, in 1947 as a very heavy bomber squadron, but conducted proficiency flying with a variety of trainer airplanes under the supervision of the 416th AAF Base Unit (later the 2347th Air Force Reserve Training Center). In a 1949 reorganization of the reserves, it became a light bomber squadron and began to equip and train with Douglas B-26 Invaders, although its manning was limited to 25% of its authorized strength. (Note: Robertson indicates the training began in 1949. Robertson, Factsheet 728 Airlift Squadron. Maurer, however, indicates that B-26 training did not begin until 1950. Maurer, Combat Squadrons, p. 725.)

The squadron was mobilized for the Korean War in August 1950 in the first wave of reserve mobilizations. To help bring it up to strength, the squadron was augmented by reservists assigned to the 448th Bombardment Wing, which was also stationed at Long Beach, but remained in reserve status until the following year. The 728th was a squadron of one of the first two reserve wings to be mobilized, (Note: The other was the 437th Troop Carrier Wing.) and administrative provisions for mobilization proved inadequate, and numerous reservists never received the telegrams calling them to active duty.

The unit moved to George Air Force Base, California, for intensive training and to be brought up to full strength. In October, the squadron deployed to Itazuke Air Base, Japan to begin combat operations. It entered combat two days later, depending on support from organizations already in theater and not waiting for support from the 452d Wing's ground echelon, which arrived by ship in November. The squadron operated from Japan and later from the southern tip of Korea. The squadron flew armed reconnaissance, intruder and interdiction missions. It supported ground troops and attacked tactical targets.

On 23 March 1951, the squadron led troop carrier aircraft carrying the 187th Airborne Infantry Regiment in an aerial assault on Munsan-ni, strafing the front lines of the Chinese Communist Forces and dropping bombs on enemy targets. Prior to June 1951, the squadron had been conducting strikes primarily in the daytime. However, due to the extent of enemy night movements, after June, the 728th focused on night operations. In May 1952, the squadron was inactivated and returned to the reserve. Its mission, personnel and aircraft were transferred to the 34th Bombardment Squadron, which was simultaneously activated at Pusan East (K-9) Air Base, South Korea.

=== Reconnaissance and bombardment in the reserves ===
The squadron was redesignated the 728th Tactical Reconnaissance Squadron and activated in June 1952 at Long Beach, where it absorbed some of the resources of the 921st Reserve Training Wing, which was inactivated. The reserve mobilization for the Korean War, however, had left the reserve without aircraft, and the unit did not receive aircraft until July 1952. Despite its tactical reconnaissance name, it was first equipped with Curtiss C-46 Commando transports. The following year, it began to equip with a mix of aircraft, including The B-26 and North American F-51 Mustang. In 1954 it received its first jets, Lockheed F-80 Shooting Stars.

In 1955, the squadron once again became the 728th Bombardment Squadron and trained with the Invader as a tactical bombardment unit. However, at this time, the Joint Chiefs of Staff were pressuring the Air Force to provide more wartime airlift. At the same time, about 150 Fairchild C-119 Flying Boxcars became available from the active force. Consequently, in November 1956 the Air Force directed Continental Air Command ConAC to convert units to the troop carrier mission by September 1957. In July 1957, the squadron became the 728th Troop Carrier Squadron.

=== Tactical airlift ===
As a troop carrier squadron the unit transitioned to the C-119 and flew them from Long Beach until reserve flying operations there ended in the fall of 1960 and the 452d Troop Carrier Wing moved to March Air Force Base. The squadron had been assigned directly to the wing since April 1959, when ConAC converted its flying wings to the dual deputy organization (Note: Under this plan flying [and missile] squadrons reported to the wing Deputy Commander for Operations and maintenance squadrons reported to the wing Deputy Commander for Maintenance.) and inactivated the 452d Troop Carrier Group. At March, in place of active duty support for reserve units, ConAC used the Air Reserve Technician Program, in which a cadre of the unit consisted of full-time personnel who were simultaneously civilian employees of the Air Force and held rank as members of the reserves.

=== Activation of groups under the wing ===
Since 1955, the Air Force had been detaching Air Force Reserve squadrons from their parent wing locations to separate sites. The concept offered several advantages: communities were more likely to accept the smaller squadrons than the large wings and the location of separate squadrons in smaller population centers would facilitate recruiting and manning. In time, the detached squadron program proved successful in attracting additional participants. Although the dispersal of flying units was not a problem when the entire wing was called to active service, mobilizing a single flying squadron and elements to support it proved difficult. This weakness was demonstrated in the partial mobilization of reserve units during the Berlin Crisis of 1961. To resolve this, at the start of 1962, ConAC determined to reorganize its reserve wings by establishing groups with support elements for each of its troop carrier squadrons. This reorganization would facilitate mobilization of elements of wings in various combinations when needed. However, as this plan was entering its implementation phase, another partial mobilization occurred for the Cuban Missile Crisis. The formation of new troop carrier groups was delayed until January for wings that had not been mobilized. The 942d Troop Carrier Group was formed at March on 17 January as the headquarters for the 728th and its supporting units.

=== Strategic airlift ===
In August 1965, the squadron received its first C-124 Globemaster II aircraft and began to transition from the tactical to the strategic airlift mission. In December, its mission formally changed and it became the 728th Air Transport Squadron, but a month later, in an Air Force wide change of names later became the 728th Military Airlift Squadron. The 728th flew regular missions in the Pacific and Far East theaters. The support these missions provided for the Republic of Vietnam resulted in the award of the Vietnamese Gallantry Cross with Palm to the squadron.

In March 1968, the squadron and its parent 942d Military Airlift Group moved their Douglas C-124 Globemaster IIs from March to Norton Air Force Base, California. As the Globemaster was retired, Air Force Reserve formed associate units. In this program reserve units flew and maintained aircraft owned by an associated regular unit. In January 1972, the 728th was reassigned to the associate 944th Military Airlift Group and began transition training to fly the Lockheed C-141 Starlifter. The following year, Air Force Reserve inactivated its reserve associate groups and the squadron was assigned directly to the 445th Military Airlift Wing.

The 728th participated in Operation Homecoming, bringing home the prisoners of war from Southeast Asia, and Operation New Life which supported the evacuation of orphans and other refugees from Vietnam to the United States. In 1989 the 728th flew many missions in support of Operation Just Cause in Panama and flew airlift missions into Southwest Asia in support of Operations Desert Shield and Desert Storm in 1991.

As a result of the closure of Norton as part of the United States Department of Defense's 1988 Base Realignment and Closure Commission program, on 1 January 1992, the 728th moved to McChord Air Force Base, Washington, where it was assigned to the 446th Military Airlift Wing. The 728th was renamed the 728th Airlift Squadron on 1 February 1992 following the reorganization of the 446th Airlift Wing under the Objective Wing system, it was joined by the 97th and 313th Airlift Squadrons within the reactivated 446th Operations Group.

Since arriving at McChord in January 1992, the 728th has participated in numerous real world contingency, peacekeeping, and humanitarian relief missions. In addition, the 728th provides active support for Phoenix Banner, Copper and Silver missions. The 728th's highest priority missions assist in the support of the president and vice president as well as secret service operations. In January 1997, a 728th crew repatriated the remains of five U.S. service members form Beijing, China, members of the Consolidated B-24J Liberator bomber crew that crashed near Liuchouw, China in August 1944 after returning from a bombing mission.

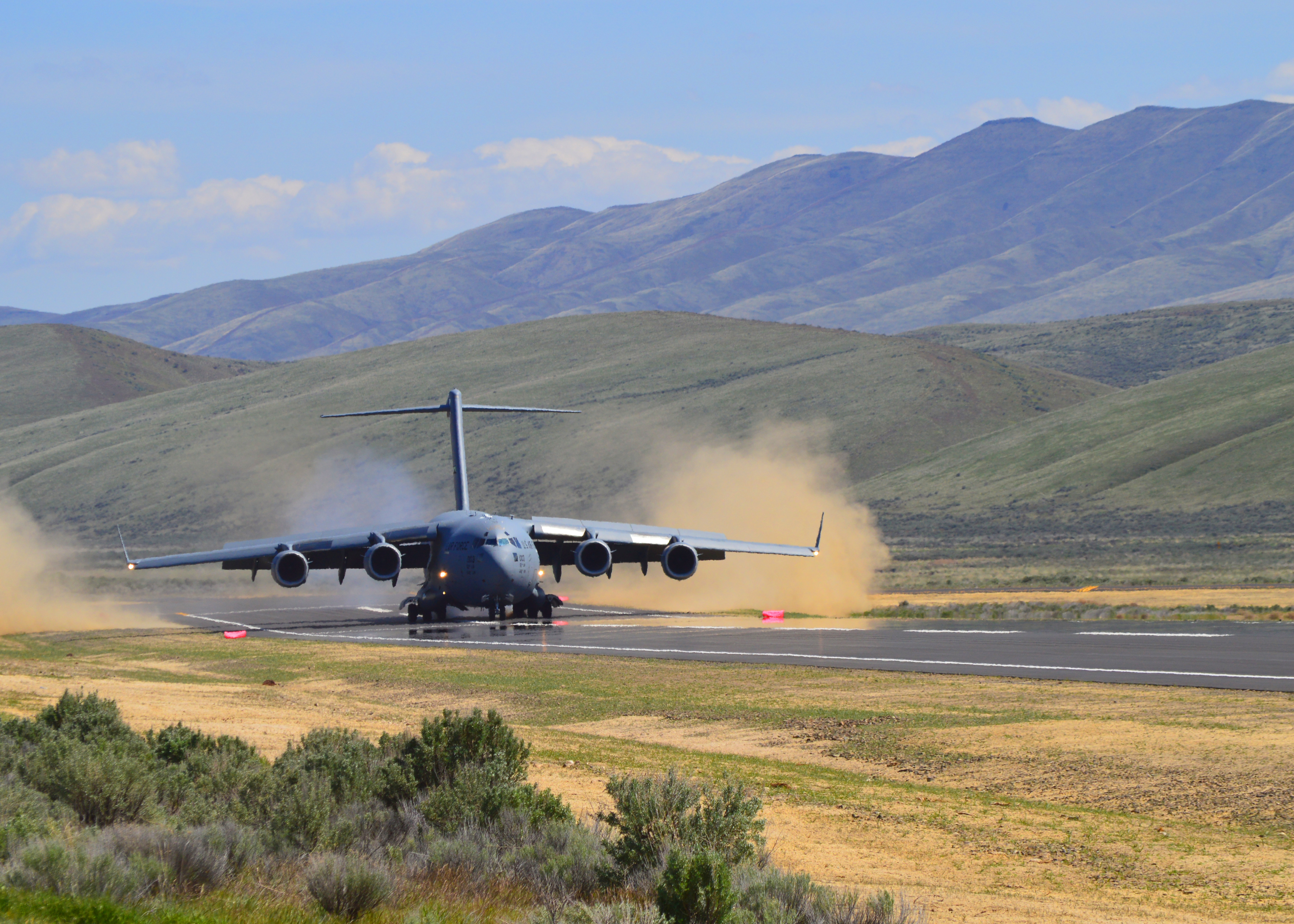
A C-17A Globemaster III operated by the 728th Airlift Squadron at the Selah Airstrip in Yakima, Washington.

The squadron was selected as the first of three associate reserve squadrons to transition to the Boeing C-17 Globemaster III. The first C-17 was delivered McChord 30 July 1999. The squadron's first operational C-17 mission, in November 1999, was a mission to Hanoi, Vietnam, where remains of 11 American servicemen, from the Korean War and the Vietnam War, were repatriated at the same time – the first time remains from two separate wars were repatriated on the same mission.

On 14 February 2003, the 728th was mobilized to support Operations Enduring Freedom (OEF) and Iraqi Freedom (OIF). From February 2003 until 13 February 2005, 728th aircrews flew combat airlift missions into Iraq and Afghanistan, performing engine running onloads/offloads of troops and equipment and flying aeromedical evacuation missions of wounded personnel. Members of the 728th also participated in the combat airdrop of the 173d Airborne Brigade over northern Iraq on 26 March 2003 as. The 728th received the Air Force Meritorious Unit Award for the period from 14 February 2003 to 13 February 2005 for its support of OEF and OIF.

== Lineage ==
- Constituted as the 728th Bombardment Squadron (Heavy) on 14 May 1943

Activated on 1 June 1943
Redesignated 728th Bombardment Squadron, Heavy on 20 August 1943
Inactivated on 28 August 1945

- Redesignated 728th Bombardment Squadron, Very Heavy on 11 March 1947

Activated in the reserve on 19 April 1947
Redesignated 728th Bombardment Squadron, Light on 27 June 1949
Ordered to active duty on 10 August 1950
Redesignated 728th Bombardment Squadron, Light, Night Intruder on 25 June 1951
Relieved from active duty, and inactivated, on 10 May 1952

- Redesignated 728th Tactical Reconnaissance Squadron on 6 June 1952

Activated in the reserve on 13 June 1952
Redesignated 728th Bombardment Squadron, Tactical on 22 May 1955
Redesignated 728th Troop Carrier Squadron, Medium on 1 July 1957
Redesignated 728th Air Transport Squadron, Heavy on 1 December 1965
Redesignated 728th Military Airlift Squadron on 1 January 1966
Redesignated 728th Military Airlift Squadron (Associate) on 1 January 1972
Redesignated 728th Airlift Squadron (Associate) on 1 February 1992
Redesignated 728th Airlift Squadron on 1 October 1994

=== Assignments ===
- 452d Bombardment Group, 1 June 1943 – 28 August 1945
- 452d Bombardment Group, 19 April 1947 – 10 May 1952
- 452d Tactical Reconnaissance Group (later 452d Bombardment Group, 452d Troop Carrier Group), 13 June 1952
- 452d Troop Carrier Wing, 14 April 1959
- 942d Troop Carrier Group (later 942d Air Transport Group, 942d Military Airlift Group), 17 January 1963
- 944th Military Airlift Group, 1 January 1972
- 445th Military Airlift Wing, 1 July 1973
- 446th Military Airlift Wing (later 446 Airlift Wing), 1 January 1992
- 446th Operations Group, 1 August 1992 – present

=== Stations ===
- Geiger Field, Washington, 1 June 1943
- Rapid City Army Air Base, South Dakota, c. 13 June 1943
- Pendleton Field, Oregon, 10 October 1943
- Walla Walla Army Air Base, Washington, c. 4 November–December 1943
- RAF Deopham Green (AAF-142), England, c. 8 January 1944 – 6 August 1945
- Sioux Falls Army Air Field, South Dakota, c. 12–28 August 1945
- Long Beach Army Air Field (later Long Beach Municipal Airport), California, 19 April 1947
- George Air Force Base, California, 10 August–October 1950
- Itazuke Air Base, Japan, 26 October 1950
- Miho Air Base, Japan, c. 10 December 1950
- Pusan East (K-9) Air Base, South Korea, 17 May 1951 – 10 May 1952
- Long Beach Municipal Airport, California, 13 June 1952
- March Air Force Base, California, 14 October 1960
- Norton Air Force Base, California, 25 March 1968
- McChord Air Force Base, Washington, 1 August 1992 – present

=== Aircraft ===
- Boeing B-17 Flying Fortress, 1943–1945
- Douglas B-26 Invader, 1949–1952, 1955–1957
- North American F-51 Mustang, 1953–1954
- Lockheed F-80 Shooting Star, 1954–1955
- Curtiss C-46 Commando, 1957–1958
- Fairchild C-119 Flying Boxcar, 1958–1965
- Douglas C-124 Globemaster II, 1965–1971
- Lockheed C-141 Starlifter, 1972–1999
- Boeing C-17 Globemaster III, 1999–present

=== Awards and campaigns ===
Award streamer	Award	Dates	Notes
	Distinguished Unit Citation	7 April 1945	Germany 728th Bombardment Squadron
	Distinguished Unit Citation	9 July-27 November 1951	Korea 728th Bombardment Squadron
	Distinguished Unit Citation	28 November 1951-30 April 1952	Korea 728th Bombardment Squadron
	Air Force Meritorious Unit Award	14 February 2003–13 February 2005	728th Airlift Squadron
	Air Force Meritorious Unit Award	1 October 2006–30 September 2007	728th Airlift Squadron
	Air Force Outstanding Unit Award	1 September 1985-31 August 1987	728th Military Airlift Squadron
	Air Force Outstanding Unit Award	1 January-31 July 1992	728th Military Airlift Squadron (later 728th Airlift Squadron)
	Air Force Outstanding Unit Award	1 July 1999-31 August 2000	728th Airlift Squadron
	Korean Presidential Unit Citation	31 October 1950-27 October 1951	728th Bombardment Squadron
	Vietnamese Gallantry Cross with Palm	1 January 1967-28 January 1973	728th Military Airlift Squadron

Campaign Streamer	Campaign	Dates	Notes
	Air Offensive, Europe	8 January 1944 – 5 June 1944	728th Bombardment Squadron
	Air Combat, EAME Theater	8 January 1944 – 11 May 1945	728th Bombardment Squadron
	Normandy	6 June 1944 – 24 July 1944	728th Bombardment Squadron
	Northern France	25 July 1944 – 14 September 1944	728th Bombardment Squadron
	Rhineland	15 September 1944 – 21 March 1945	728th Bombardment Squadron
	Ardennes-Alsace	16 December 1944 – 25 January 1945	728th Bombardment Squadron
	Central Europe	22 March 1944 – 21 May 1945	728th Bombardment Squadron
	CCF Intervention	3 November 1950 – 24 January 1951	728th Bombardment Squadron
	1st UN Counteroffensive	25 January 1951 – 21 April 1951	728th Bombardment Squadron
	CCF Spring Offensive	22 April 1951 – 9 July 1951	728th Bombardment Squadron
	UN Summer-Fall Offensive	9 July 1951 – 27 November 1951	728th Bombardment Squadron
	Second Korean Winter	28 November 1951 – 30 April 1952	728th Bombardment Squadron
	Korea Summer-Fall 1952	1 May 1952 – 10 May 1952	728th Bombardment Squadron
	Defense of Saudi Arabia	2 August 1990 – 16 January 1991	728th Military Airlift Squadron
	Liberation and Defense of Kuwait	17 January 1991 – 11 April 1991	728th Military Airlift Squadron

== See also ==
- List of United States Air Force airlift squadrons
- List of A-26 Invader operators
- B-17 Flying Fortress units of the United States Army Air Forces
