= 452nd Air Mobility Wing =

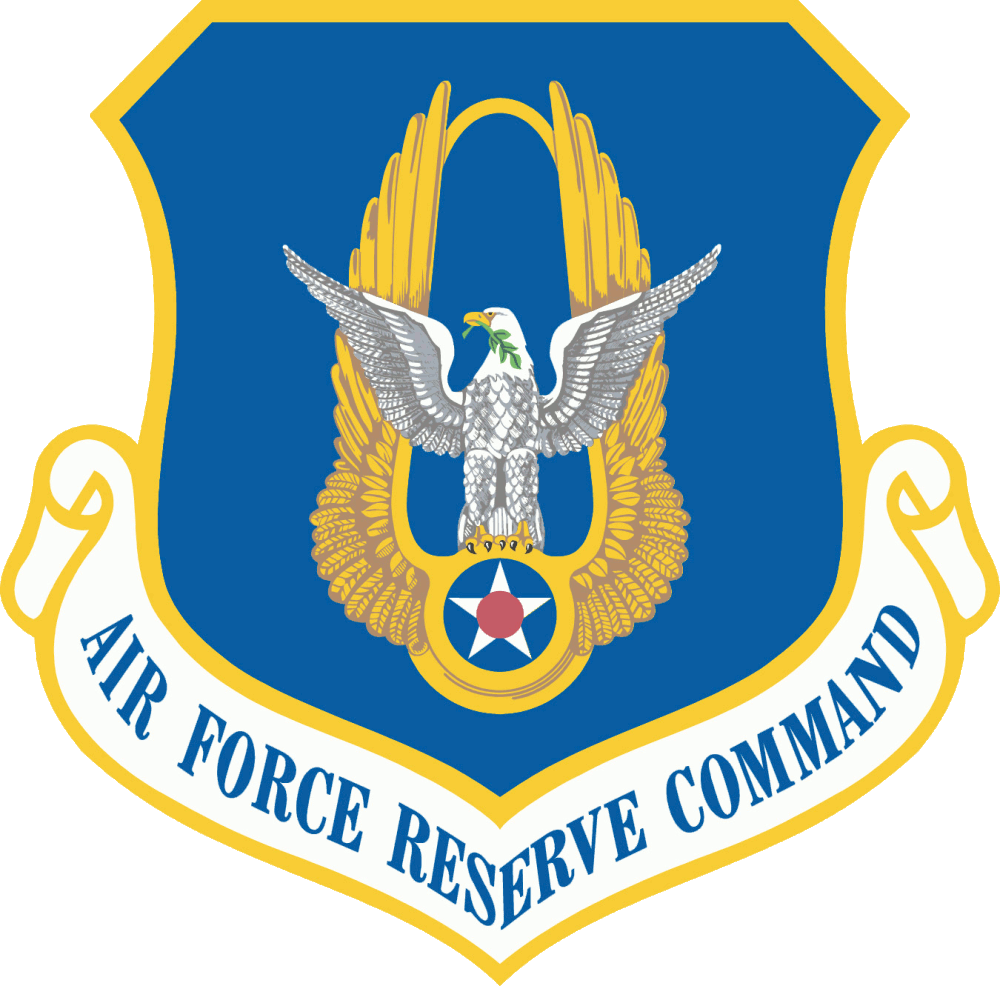
452nd Air Mobility Wing

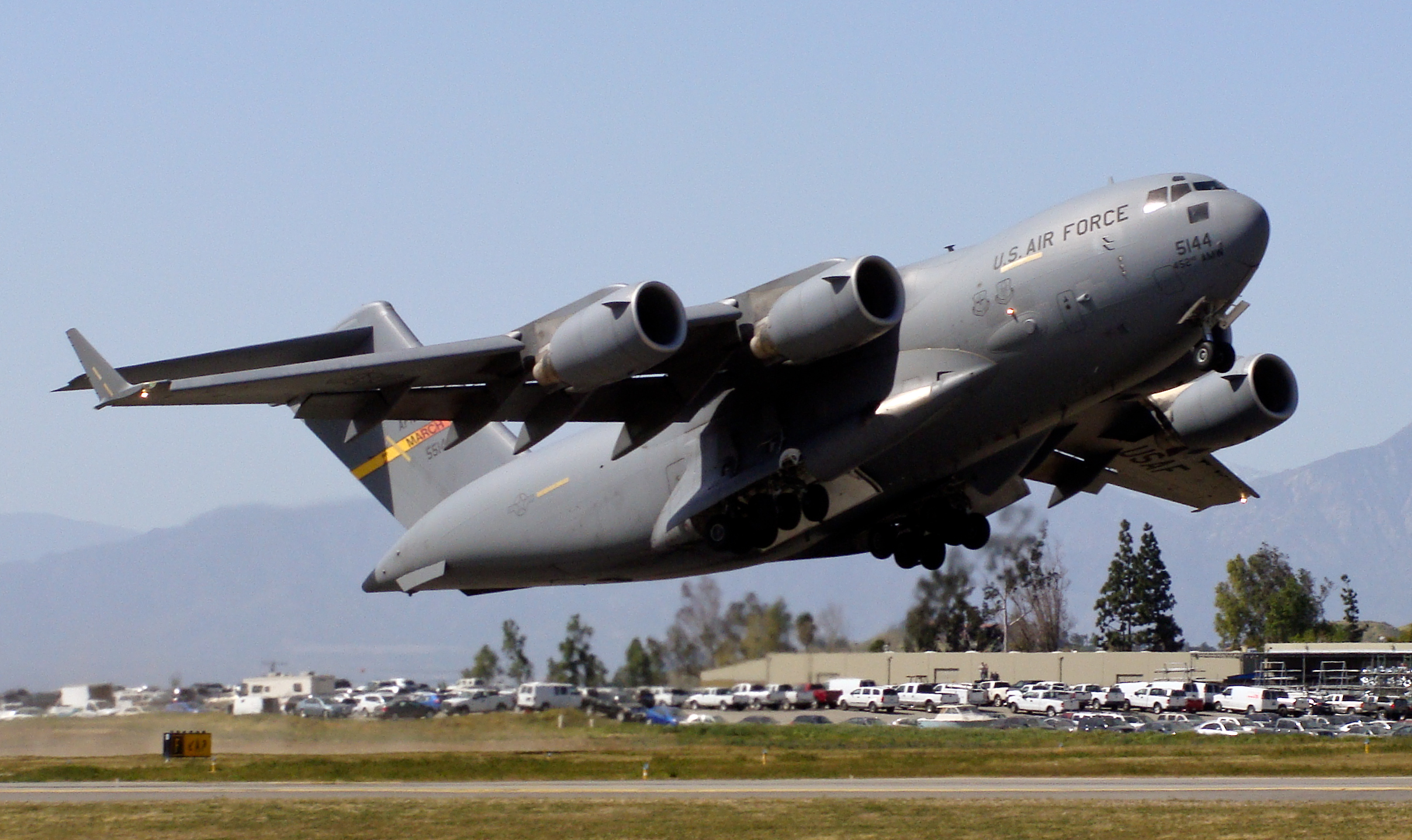
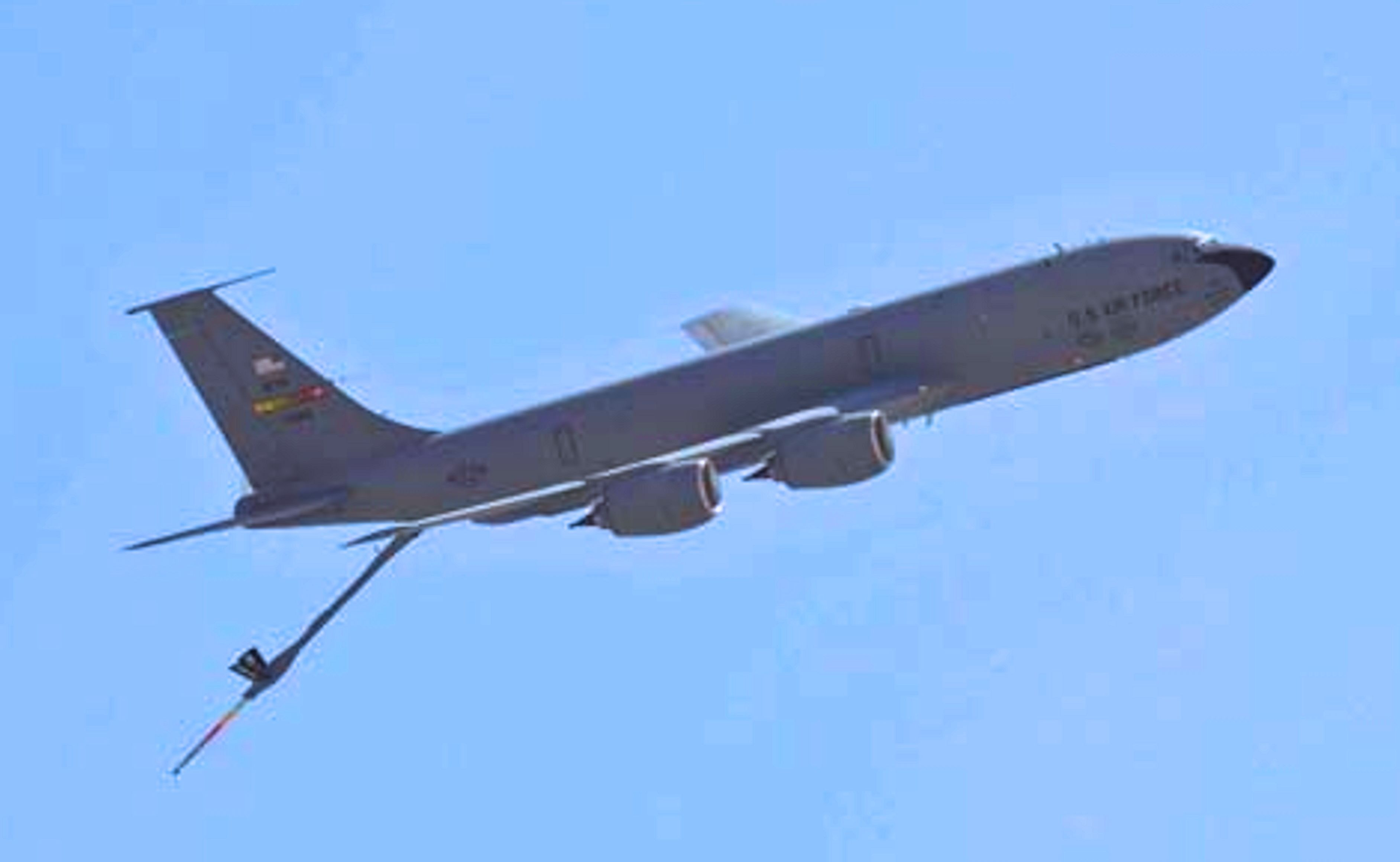
- A 452nd Wing C-17 Globemaster III A Wing KC-135 extends its refueling boom for display (Note: Taken during the March Field AirFest 2012, held 19–20 May 2012.)
- Active: 1949–1952; 1952–present
- Country: United States
- Branch: United States Air Force
- Type: Wing
- Role: Airlift/Air refueling
- Part of: Air Force Reserve Command
- Garrison/HQ: March Air Reserve Base, California
- Motto: Labor ad Futurum (Latin for 'Work for the Future')
- Engagements: European Theater of Operations Korean War
- Decorations: Distinguished Unit Citation; Air Force Outstanding Unit Award; Republic of Korea Presidential Unit Citation; Republic of Vietnam Gallantry Cross with Palm

Commanders
- Current commander: Col. Bryan M. Bailey

Insignia
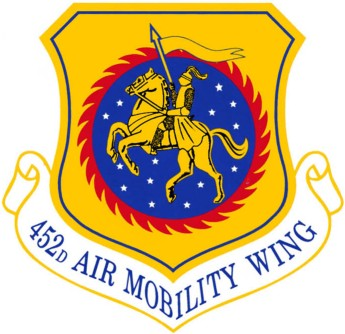
- 452nd Air Mobility Wing emblem (Note: Approved 10 February 1960.)

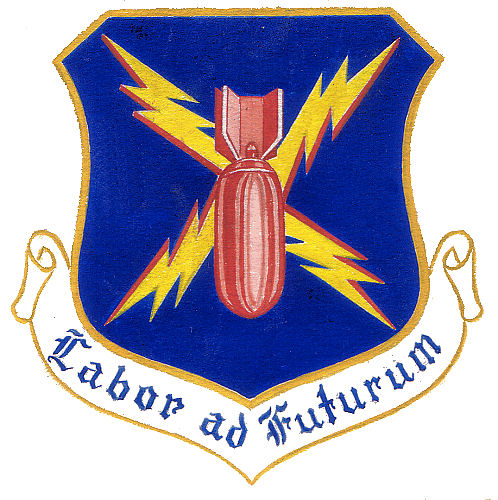
- 452nd Bombardment Wing emblem (Note: Approved 8 March 1956.)

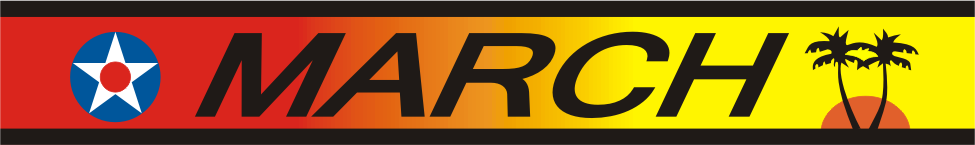
- Tail code

Aircraft flown
- Transport: C-17 Globemaster III
- Tanker: KC-135R Stratotanker

The 452nd Air Mobility Wing is an Air Reserve Component of the United States Air Force. It is assigned to the Fourth Air Force, Air Force Reserve Command, stationed at March Air Reserve Base, California. If mobilized, the Wing is gained by the Air Mobility Command.

== Mission ==
The 452nd Air Mobility Wing's mission is to organize, train and equip aircrews to provide air refueling and strategic airlift any time, any place. The wing's aircraft operate under widely varying situations ranging from small movements in battle to large movements over long distances.

== Units ==
The 452d Air Mobility Wing consists of the following major units:

- 452d Operations Group

336th Air Refueling Squadron (KC-135R)
729th Airlift Squadron (C-17)
452d Aeromedical Evacuation Squadron

- 452d Maintenance Group
- 452d Mission Support Group
- 452d Medical Group

== History ==
=== Initial activation and mobilization ===
The wing was first activated as a reserve organization at Long Beach Army Air Field California in June 1949 as the 452nd Bombardment Wing, when Continental Air Command (ConAC) converted its reserve flying organizations under the wing base organization, which combined them with their support organizations under a single wing. It trained under the supervision of the 2347th Air Force Reserve Training Center. President Truman's reduced 1949 defense budget also required reductions in the number of units in the Air Force, and the wing drew its cadre from the 304th Air Division, which was simultaneously inactivated, and the 459th Bombardment Group, which moved on paper to Davis-Monthan Air Force Base, Arizona. The wing trained for light bomber with the Douglas B-26 Invader, but also operated trainer aircraft. The wing was manned at 25% of normal strength but its combat group was authorized four squadrons rather than the three of active duty units.

The wing, along with all reserve combat and corollary units, was mobilized for the Korean war. It was called up in August 1950, and was one of the first two reserve wings to be mobilized. The wing was brought up to strength by absorbing more than half the personnel of the 448th Bombardment Wing, also located at Long Beach. Upon mobilization, the wing moved to George Air Force Base, California, and began accelerated aircrew training.

=== Korean War ===
On 15 October 1950, the first of five echelons of the 452nd left George for Itazuke Air Base, Kyushu, Japan. Its 731st Bombardment Squadron, trained in night operations, was detached to the 3rd Bombardment Wing at Iwakuni Air Base, Honshu, Japan. The first B-26 of the 452nd arrived at Itazuke on 25 October, and two days later the wing flew its initial B-26 interdiction mission to Korea, exactly seventy-seven days after recall. On the last day of the month, the aircrews of the 452nd learned they were in a real shooting war, as three Yakovlev fighters jumped one of their B-26s and a Mosquito controller near Yangsi. The B-26 crew shot down one of the Soviet-designed fighters, and North American F-51 Mustangs arrived to destroy the other two.

Upon arrival in the theater, the 452nd Bombardment Wing was the only B-26 unit conducting daylight operations. Until June 1951, it gave close support to ground units in Korea and engaged in interdiction of communist-held airfields, supply lines, and bridges, reaching peak operations in February 1951.

The wing moved to Miho Air Base on Honshu, Japan, on 10 December, and within a few days it suffered its first combat losses. Four B-26s and all their crews were lost, only one to hostile fire. One aircraft hit a cable on a power line during a low-level attack, a second flew into a mountain on takeoff in a snow squall, and a third dove out of the overcast into water. The fourth was knocked down by ground fire near Sunchon, North Korea. The 3 men in that crew parachuted free, but shortly after were captured and executed by unknown North Korean guerrillas.

On 25 April 1951, the enemy began a spring offensive, and Fifth Air Force required an extensive effort of the 452nd. For the next eight days the wing dispatched thirty to thirty-six sorties a day, getting maximum use from the approximately eighteen aircraft available each day. This required a refuel and rearm turnaround mission for each aircraft each day. The effort placed a heavy flying burden on all combat personnel as each crew was required to fly nine of ten days. As their effort began to exhaust the combat crews, pilots and observers serving in wing staff and support positions were pressed into service. This surge in operations also produced a sharp increase in maintenance activity as the aircraft sustained extensive battle damage. Three B-26s were lost behind enemy lines, and four others, only one of which was salvaged, sustained major battle damage.

The B-26s were effective in low-level attacks with machine guns, rockets, and bombs, but their crews found it difficult to maneuver at low altitudes in the small valleys of Korea, walled by hills rising from 500 to 5,000 feet. The moment of level flying needed to launch bombs and fire rockets made the light bombers vulnerable to ground fire, and combat losses soon forced them to bomb from medium altitudes. For its combat actions between 9 July 1951 – 27 November 1951 and 28 November 1951 – 30 April 1952 the wing received a second Distinguished Unit Citation. The only combat wing to be cited twice during the Korean War.Korean President Syngman Rhee personally presented the Wing with the Korean Presidential Unit Citation In addition it received credit for participating in eight campaigns.

==== 731st Bombardment Squadron ====
The 452nd's separated 731st Squadron completed its move from George to Iwakuni on 20 November 1950. Four crews which had left George as an advance echelon on 15 September participated in combat during October, and the unit put up its first complete squadron mission on 14 November 1950.

From the beginning of operations in Korea, the Air Force had been unable to attack moving targets at night. On 6 September 1950, General Vandenberg suggested that General Stratemeyer convert the 3rd Group completely to night attack and assign the 731st Squadron, especially trained for low-level operations, to the understrength 3rd Group. General Stratemeyer quickly implemented this solution to his night-attack problem.

During its seven-month Korean tour, the 731st flew more than 9,000 hours of combat on 2,000 combat sorties. Its missions included high-, medium-, and low-level visual and radar bombing, front-line close support, flare drops, and armed reconnaissance-all under conditions of darkness. When the 3rd Bombardment Wing was brought up to full strength by the acquisition of the 90th Bombardment Squadron as a third active force unit, the 731st was inactivated at Iwakuni on 25 June 1951.

On 10 May 1952, having served its prescribed twenty-one months, the 452nd Bombardment Wing was relieved from active military service, and was inactivated at Pusan East (K-9) Air Base and its personnel and equipment transferred to the 17th Bombardment Wing. The reservists had accumulated nearly 14,000 combat sorties during its active service.

=== Reconnaissance and Bombardment in the reserves ===
The wing was redesignated the 452nd Tactical Reconnaissance Wing and activated in June 1952 at Long Beach, where it absorbed the resources of the 921st Reserve Training Wing, which was inactivated. The reserve mobilization for the Korean War, however, had left the reserve without aircraft, and the unit did not receive aircraft until July 1952. Despite its tactical reconnaissance name, it was first equipped with Curtiss C-46 Commando transports. The following year, it began to equip with a mix of aircraft, including The B-26 and North American F-51 Mustang. In 1954 it received its first jets, Lockheed F-80 Shooting Stars.

In 1955, the wing once again became the 452nd Bombardment Wing and trained with the Invader as a tactical bombardment wing. However, at this time, the Joint Chiefs of Staff were pressuring the Air Force to provide more wartime airlift. At the same time, about 150 Fairchild C-119 Flying Boxcars became available from the active force. Consequently, in November 1956 the Air Force directed ConAC to convert units to the troop carrier mission by September 1957. In July 1957, the wing became the 452nd Troop Carrier Wing.

=== Airlift operations ===
The wing began troop carrier operations with Curtiss Commandos and Douglas C-47 Skytrains, finally receiving Fairchild C-119 Flying Boxcars in 1958. Shortly after the change in mission, the wing was impacted by the Detached Squadron Concept.

Since 1955, the Air Force began had been detaching Air Force Reserve squadrons from their parent wing locations to separate sites. The concept offered several advantages: communities were more likely to accept the smaller squadrons than the large wings and the location of separate squadrons in smaller population centers would facilitate recruiting and manning. In time, the detached squadron program proved successful in attracting additional participants. The 728th, 729th, and 730th Squadrons had all been stationed with the wing at Long Beach. However, in November 1957, the 733rd Troop Carrier Squadron was activated at Hill Air Force Base, Utah to replace the 313th Troop Carrier Squadron and became part of the wing.

The wing began to use inactive duty training periods for Operation Swift Lift, transporting high priority cargo for the air force and Operation Ready Swap, transporting aircraft engines, between Air Materiel Command's depots. The wing continued to train with the 2347th Center until 1958, when the center was inactivated and some of its personnel were absorbed by the wing. In place of active duty support for reserve units, ConAC adopted the Air Reserve Technician Program, in which a cadre of the unit consisted of full-time personnel who were simultaneously civilian employees of the Air Force and held rank as members of the reserves.

In April 1959, the wing converted to the Dual Deputate organization, (Note: Under this plan flying squadrons reported to the wing Deputy Commander for Operations and maintenance squadrons reported to the wing Deputy Commander for Maintenance.) and all flying and maintenance squadrons were directly assigned to the wing, when the 452d Troop Carrier Group was inactivated. In October 1960, the wing moved its Long Beach operations to March Air Force Base, California.

=== Activation of groups under the wing ===
Although the dispersal of flying units was not a problem when the entire wing was called to active service, mobilizing a single flying squadron and elements to support it proved difficult. This weakness was demonstrated in the partial mobilization of reserve units during the Berlin Crisis of 1961. To resolve this, at the start of 1962, ConAC determined to reorganize its reserve wings by establishing groups with support elements for each of its troop carrier squadrons. This reorganization would facilitate mobilization of elements of wings in various combinations when needed. However, as this plan was entering its implementation phase, another partial mobilization occurred for the Cuban Missile Crisis. The mobilization included the 733rd Squadron at Hill, which was assigned to the 349th Troop Carrier Wing while mobilized, but not the wing and remaining squadrons at Long Beach.

The formation of new troop carrier groups was delayed until January for wings that had not been mobilized. The 942nd, 943rd and 944th Troop Carrier Groups at March, and the 945th Troop Carrier Group at Hill were all assigned to the wing on 17 January.

Trained as a military airlift wing, 1966–1972; as a tactical airlift wing, 1972–1976. From 1957 to 1976 the 452nd participated in troop carrier and airlift joint training exercises with ground forces and performed routing, special transport, and humanitarian missions within the U.S. In the early 1960s began flying missions to Alaska, including airlift support for exercises and humanitarian relief missions for the 1964 Alaska earthquake. Airlifted troops and cargo to the Dominican Republic during the 1965 contingency operation (Power Pack) to restore a stable government there. In 1965 began flying airlift missions worldwide, but especially to the Far East and Southeast Asia. Was the base host organization at Hamilton Air Force Base, 1 October 1973 – December 1975.

Converted to an air refueling mission in 1976, the first reserve wing to directly support Strategic Air Command (SAC) bombers. From 1977 participated in tanker task forces worldwide. On 1 October 1977 the 336th Air Refueling Squadron began standing permanent alert duty with the active duty bombardment wing at March, a duty which continued until cancellation of Strategic Air Command (SAC) alert on 27 September 1991. Won the wing navigation trophy at the SAC Bombing and Navigation Competitions in 1983 and 1985 and the Saunders Trophy in 1985.

Deployed aircraft and volunteer aircrews and other personnel to Saudi Arabia in support of Desert Shield, beginning August 1990. The 336th ARS went on active duty in December 1990 and two squadron aircrews were among the first refuelers to launch on the first day of the Southwest Asia War (Desert Storm) against Iraq. Also, the Security Police Flight went on active duty and deployed to Saudi Arabia, February–June 1991

=== Post Cold War ===
On 1 April 1993, the 445th Military Airlift Wing located at Norton Air Force Base, California, became the first associate wing to transition to a "unit-equipped" wing by taking ownership of its own aircraft and resources. In 1993, March was selected for realignment. The 445th MAW was transferred from Norton AFB, to March AFB. As part of the Air Force's realignment, one of March's two reserve units, the 445th Military Airlift Wing, was inactivated and its personnel and equipment transferred to the 452nd, which was redesignated the 452nd Air Mobility Wing on 1 April 1994. On 1 April 1996, March became March Air Reserve Base. In 2000 452 Maintenance won Best C141 Maintenance Unit, Best BPO in Airlift Rodeo 2000 at Pope AFB. The last Rodeo for C141 competition. In 2005, the wing retired its C-141 fleet.

August 9, 2005 the wing received its first Boeing C-17 Globemaster III strategic airlifter, named "Spirit of California". This was the first of nine C-17s assigned to the 452nd, the wing became the first Air Force Reserve Command C-17 Globemaster III unit.

== Lineage ==
- Established as the 452nd Bombardment Wing, Light on 10 May 1949

Activated in the reserve on 27 June 1949
Ordered into active service on 10 August 1950
Inactivated on 10 May 1952

- Redesignated: 452nd Tactical Reconnaissance Wing on 6 June 1952

Activated in the reserve on 13 June 1952
Redesignated 452nd Bombardment Wing, Tactical on 22 May 1955
Redesignated 452nd Troop Carrier Wing, Medium on 1 July 1957
Redesignated 452nd Military Airlift Wing on 1 July 1966
Redesignated 452nd Tactical Airlift Wing on 1 April 1972
Redesignated 452nd Air Refueling Wing on 1 October 1976
Redesignated 452nd Air Refueling Wing, Heavy on 8 March 1978
Redesignated 452nd Air Refueling Wing on 1 February 1992
Redesignated 452nd Air Mobility Wing on 1 May 1994

=== Assignments ===
- Fourth Air Force, 27 June 1949
- Tactical Air Command, 10 August 1950
- Fifth Air Force, 15 November 1950 – 10 May 1952 (attached to 8th Fighter-Bomber Wing until 30 November 1950, 314th Air Division, 1 December 1950 – 25 May 1951)
- Fourth Air Reserve District, 13 June 1952
- Fourth Air Force, 1 December 1952
- Sixth Air Force Reserve Region, 1 September 1960
- Western Air Force Reserve Region, 31 December 1969
- Tenth Air Force, 8 October 1976
- Fourth Air Force, 1 October 1993 – present

=== Components ===
Groups

- 98th Air Refueling Group: 1 August 1992 – 1 October 1993
- 452nd Bombardment Group (later 452nd Tactical Reconnaissance Group, 452nd Bombardment Group, 452nd Troop Carrier Group, 452nd Operations Group): 27 June 1949 – 10 May 1952; 13 June 1952 – 14 April 1959; 1 August 1992–
- 904th Tactical Airlift Group: 31 December 1969 – 1 September 1975
- 916th Air Refueling Group, 1 October 1986 – 1 July 1987
- 931st Air Refueling Group, 1 July 1978 – 1 July 1987
- 939th Tactical Airlift Group (later 939th Military Airlift Group): 26 January 1968 – 15 June 1969 (detached entire period)
- 940th Air Refueling Group: 26 January 1968 – 1 October 1994
- 942nd Troop Carrier Group (later 942nd Air Transport Group, 942nd Military Airlift Group): 17 January 1963 – 1 January 1972
- 943rd Troop Carrier Group (later 943rd Tactical Airlift Group): 17 January 1963 – 25 April 1969
- 944th Troop Carrier Group (later 944th Tactical Airlift Group, 944th Military Airlift Group): 17 January 1963 – 25 July 1969 (detached after 25 March 1968)
- 945th Troop Carrier Group (later 945th Military Airlift Group): 17 January 1963 – 1 July 1972 (detached after 15 February 1972)

Squadrons

- 77th Air Refueling Squadron: 1 October 1985 – 1 October 1986
- 78th Air Refueling Squadron: 1 November 1981 – 1 October 1987
- 79th Air Refueling Squadron: 1 September 1982 – 1 August 1992
- 336th Air Refueling Squadron: 1 September 1975 – 1 August 1992
- 728th Troop Carrier Squadron: 14 April 1959 – 17 January 1963
- 729th Troop Carrier Squadron: 14 April 1959 – 17 January 1963
- 730th Troop Carrier Squadron: 14 April 1959 – 17 January 1963
- 733rd Troop Carrier Squadron: 14 April 1959 – 28 October 1962, 28 November 1962 – 17 January 1963
- Reserve Air Refueling Squadron, Provisional, 9500: attached 1 November 1980 – 1 November 1981

=== Stations ===
- Long Beach Army Air Field (later Long Beach Municipal Airport), California, 27 June 1949
- George Air Force Base, California, 10 August – October 1950
- Itazuke Air Base, Japan, 26 October 1950
- Miho Air Base, Japan, c. 10 December 1950
- Pusan East (K-9) Air Base, South Korea, 23 May 1951 – 10 May 1952
- Long Beach Airport, California, 13 June 1952
- March Air Force Base, California, 14 October 1960
- Hamilton Air Force Base, California, 1 January 1972
- March Air Force Base (later March Air Reserve Base), California 12 January 1976 – present

=== Aircraft ===
- Douglas B-26 Invader, 1949–1952; 1953–1957
- Beechcraft T-11 Kansan
- Douglas FB-26 Invader, 1953–1954
- Douglas TB-26 Invader, 1954–1957
- Curtiss C-46 Commando, 1952–1954, 1957–1958
- North American F-51 Mustang, 1953–1954
- North American TF-51 Mustang, 1953–1954
- Beechcraft C-45 Expeditor, 1953–1955, 1957–1958
- Lockheed F-80 Shooting Star, 1954–1955
- Lockheed TF-80 Shooting Star, 1954–1955
- North American B-25 Mitchell, 1954–1955
- Douglas C-47 Skytrain, 1957–1958
- Fairchild C-119 Flying Boxcar, 1958–1969
- Douglas C-124 Globemaster II, 1965–1972
- Lockheed C-130 Hercules, 1972–1976
- Boeing KC-135 Stratotanker, 1976–present
- McDonnell Douglas KC-10 Extender, 1981–1995
- Lockheed C-141 Starlifter, 1994–2005
- Boeing C-17 Globemaster III, 2005–present
