= 942nd Military Airlift Group =

942nd Military Airlift Group

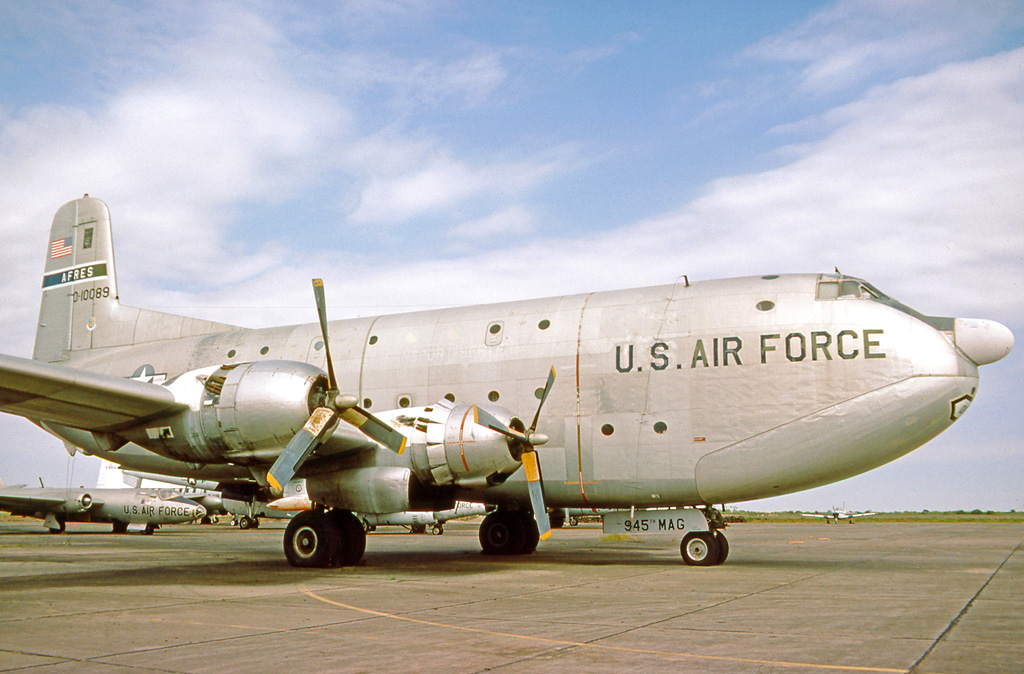
- Air Force Reserve Douglas C-124 (Note: Aircraft is Douglas C-124C Globemaster II serial 51–89)
- Active: 1963–1972
- Country: United States
- Branch: United States Air Force
- Role: Airlift
- Part of: Air Force Reserve

The 942nd Military Airlift Group is an inactive United States Air Force Reserve unit. It was last active with the 452nd Military Airlift Wing, based at Norton AFB, California. It was inactivated on 1 January 1972.

== History ==
=== Need for reserve troop carrier groups ===
After May 1959, the reserve flying force consisted of 45 troop carrier squadrons assigned to 15 troop carrier wings. (Note: There were an additional four rescue squadrons not assigned to the wings. Cantwell, p. 156) The squadrons were not all located with their parent wings, but were spread over thirty-five Air Force, Navy and civilian airfields under what was called the Detached Squadron Concept. The concept offered several advantages. Communities were more likely to accept the smaller squadrons than the large wings and the location of separate squadrons in smaller population centers would facilitate recruiting and manning. However, under this concept, all support organizations were located with the wing headquarters. Although this was not a problem when the entire wing was called to active service, mobilizing a single flying squadron and elements to support it proved difficult. This weakness was demonstrated in the partial mobilization of reserve units during the Berlin Crisis of 1961. To resolve this, at the start of 1962, Continental Air Command, (ConAC) determined to reorganize its reserve wings by establishing groups with support elements for each of its troop carrier squadrons. This reorganization would facilitate mobilization of elements of wings in various combinations when needed.

=== Activation of the 942nd Troop Carrier Group ===
As a result, the 942nd Troop Carrier Group was established at March Air Force Base, California on 17 January 1963 as the headquarters for the 728th Troop Carrier Squadron, which had been stationed there since October 1960. Along with group headquarters, a Combat Support Squadron, Materiel Squadron and a Tactical Infirmary were organized to support the 728th. The group was equipped with Fairchild C-119 Flying Boxcars for Tactical Air Command airlift operations.

The group was one of four C-119 groups assigned to the 452nd Troop Carrier Wing in 1963, the others were the 943rd and 944th Troop Carrier Groups, also at March, and the 945th Troop Carrier Group at Hill Air Force Base, Utah.

In 1965, the group converted to the Douglas C-124 Globemaster II. The group flew overseas missions, particularly to the Far East and Southeast Asia during the Vietnam War. In 1971, the group began phasing out the C-124 and was inactivated on 1 January 1972. The group's 728th Squadron moved to McChord Air Force Base, Washington, and re-equipped with Lockheed C-141 Starlifters.

== Lineage ==
- Established as the 942nd Troop Carrier Group, Medium and activated on 28 December 1962 (not organized)

Organized in the Reserve on 17 January 1963
Redesignated 942nd Air Transport Group, Heavy on 1 December 1965
Redesignated 942nd Military Airlift Group on 1 January 1966
Inactivated on 1 January 1972

=== Assignments ===
- Continental Air Command, 28 December 1962 (not organized)
- 452nd Troop Carrier Wing (later 452nd Military Airlift Wing), 17 January 1963 – 1 January 1972

=== Components ===
- 728th Troop Carrier Squadron (later 728th Military Airlift Squadron), 17 January 1963 – 1 January 1972

=== Stations ===
- March Air Force Base, California, 17 January 1963 – 25 March 1968
- Norton Air Force Base, California, 25 March 1968 – 1 January 1972

=== Aircraft ===
- Fairchild C-119 Flying Boxcar, 1963–1965
- Douglas C-124 Globemaster II, 1965–1971
