= 945th Military Airlift Group =

945th Military Airlift Group

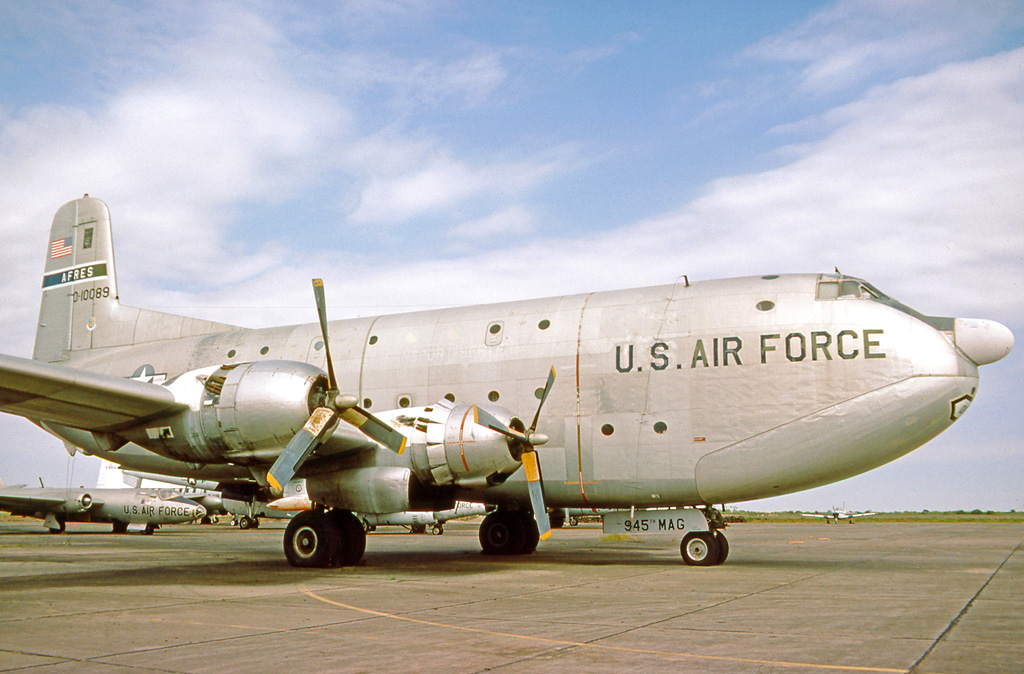
- Douglas C-124C Globemaster II of the 945th Military Airlift Group
- Active: 1963–1973
- Country: United States
- Branch: United States Air Force
- Role: Airlift
- Part of: Air Force Reserve

The 945th Military Airlift Group is an inactive United States Air Force Reserve unit. It was last active with the 452d Military Airlift Wing, based at Hill Air Force Base, Utah. It was inactivated on 1 January 1973

== History ==
=== Need for reserve troop carrier groups ===
After May 1959, the reserve flying force consisted of 45 troop carrier squadrons assigned to 15 troop carrier wings. (Note: There were an additional four rescue squadrons not assigned to the wings. Cantwell, p. 156) The squadrons were not all located with their parent wings, but were spread over thirty-five Air Force, Navy and civilian airfields under what was called the Detached Squadron Concept. The concept offered several advantages. Communities were more likely to accept the smaller squadrons than the large wings and the location of separate squadrons in smaller population centers would facilitate recruiting and manning. However, under this concept, all support organizations were located with the wing headquarters. Although this was not a problem when the entire wing was called to active service, mobilizing a single flying squadron and elements to support it proved difficult. This weakness was demonstrated in the partial mobilization of reserve units during the Berlin Crisis of 1961. To resolve this, at the start of 1962, Continental Air Command, (ConAC) determined to reorganize its reserve wings by establishing groups with support elements for each of its troop carrier squadrons. This reorganization would facilitate mobilization of elements of wings in various combinations when needed.

=== Activation of the 945th Troop Carrier Group ===
As a result, the 945th Troop Carrier Group was established at Hill Air Force Base, Utash on 17 January 1963 as the headquarters for the 733d Troop Carrier Squadron, which had been stationed there since November 1957. Along with group headquarters, a Combat Support Squadron, Materiel Squadron and a Tactical Infirmary were organized to support the 733d. The group was equipped with Fairchild C-119 Flying Boxcars for Tactical Air Command airlift operations.

The group was one of four C-119 groups assigned to the 452d Troop Carrier Wing in 1963. The others were the 942d, 943d and 945th Troop Carrier Group at March Air Force Base, California.

The group flew routine tactical airlift missions in the western states.

The group later flew overseas missions with the Douglas C-124 Globemaster II, particularly to the Far East and Southeast Asia during the Vietnam War. In 1971, the group began phasing out the C-124 and was inactivated on 1 January 1973 along with the 733d.

== Lineage ==
- Established as the 945th Troop Carrier Group, Medium and activated on 28 December 1962 (not organized)

Organized in the Reserve on 17 January 1963
Redesignated: 945th Military Airlift Group on 1 July 1966
Inactivated on 1 January 1973

=== Assignments ===
- Continental Air Command, 28 December 1962 (not organized)
- 452d Troop Carrier Wing (later 452d Military Airlift Wing), 17 January 1963
- 301st Tactical Fighter Wing, 1 July 1972 – 1 January 1973

=== Components ===
- 733d Troop Carrier Squadron (later Military Airlift Squadron), 17 January 1963 – 1 January 1973

=== Stations ===
- Hill Air Force Base, Utah, 17 January 1963 – 1 January 1973

=== Aircraft ===
- Fairchild C-119 Flying Boxcar, 1963–1965
- Douglas C-124 Globemaster II, 1965–1973
