= 733rd Military Airlift Squadron =

U.S. Air Force unit

733d Military Airlift Squadron
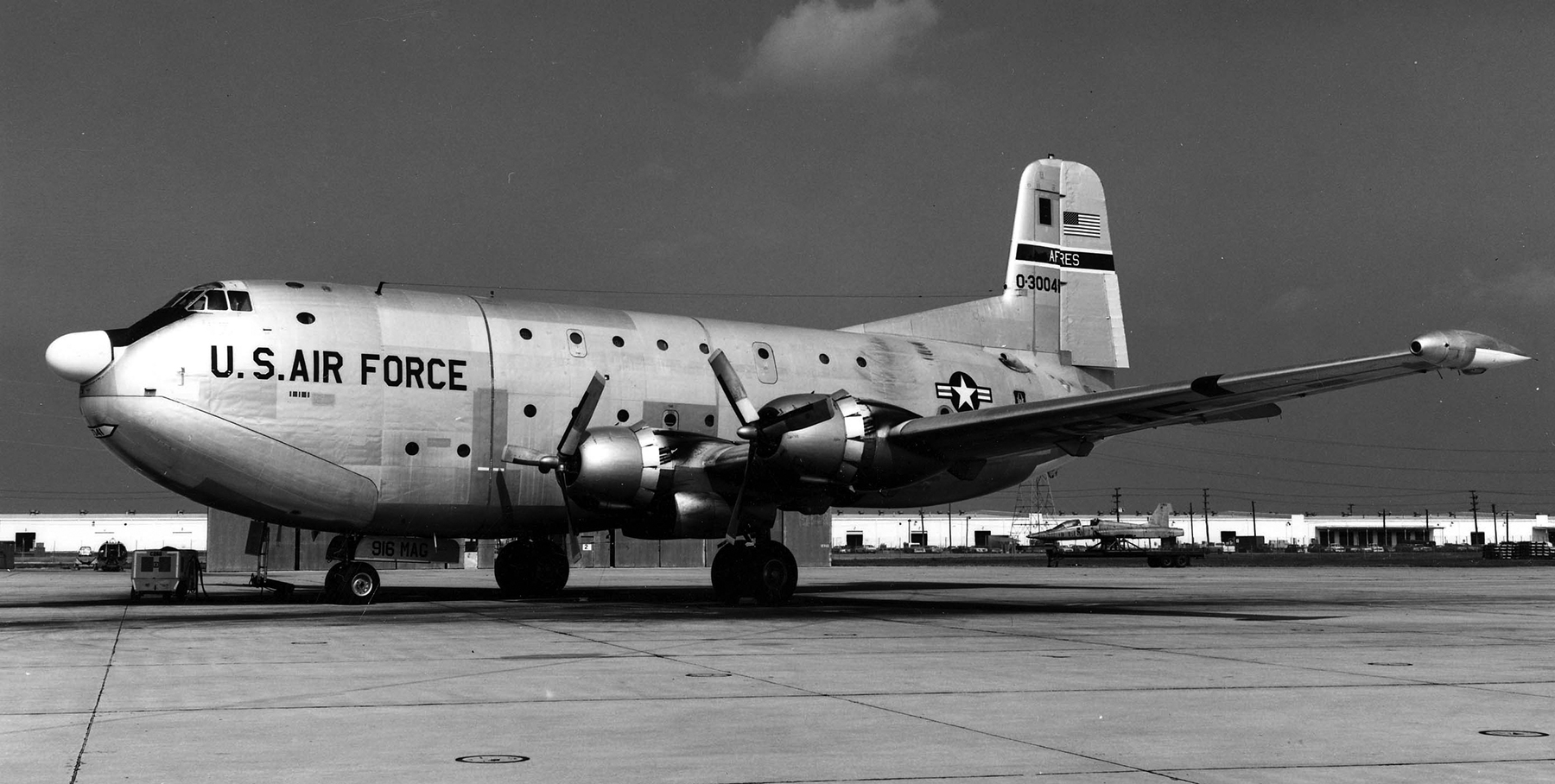
- Air Force Reserve C-124 Globemaster
- Active: 1942–1945; 1947–1951; 1952–1955; 1957–1973
- Country: United States
- Branch: United States Air Force
- Role: Airlift
- Motto: The Only Way to Fly
- Engagements: European Theater of Operations
- Decorations: Distinguished Unit Citation

Insignia
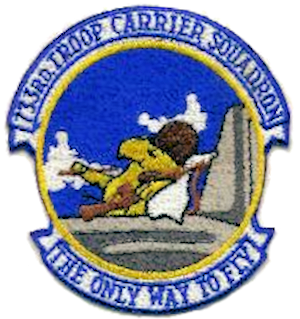
- Patch with 733d Troop Carrier Squadron emblem (Note: Approved 22 April 1960. Description: On an Air Force blue disc bordered Air Force golden yellow, two white cloud formations surmounted by an Air Force golden yellow Western Airlines TV bird in profile, resting comfortably against a white pillow as he sits in a chair, a helmet on his head, a cigarette in holder in his right hand, and with his left hand supporting a rifle against his left shoulder, all golden brown, all atop the tail section of an aircraft issuing from base, the tail fin rising in sinister white, shaded silver-gray; Outline and details Air Force blue throughout.)

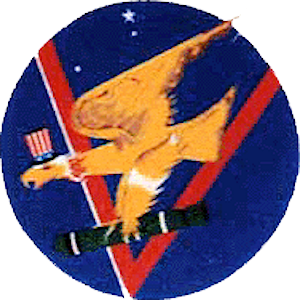
- 333d Bombardment Squadron emblem World War II
- World War II Fuselage code: TS

The 733rd Military Airlift Squadron, officially the 733d Military Airlift Squadron, is an inactive United States Air Force unit. It was activated as the 333rd Bombardment Squadron during World War II. After training in the United States, it deployed to the European Theater of Operations, where it participated in the strategic bombing campaign against Germany, earning two Distinguished Unit Citations. It returned to the United States in December 1945 and was inactivated at the Port of Embarkation.

The squadron was reactivated at Marietta Army Air Field, Georgia in the reserves in 1947, but was not fully manned or equipped until 1949, when it began to receive Douglas B-26 Invaders. It was inactivated on 20 March 1951 after being called to active duty for the Korean War, with its personnel used as "fillers" to bring other units up to strength.

When the Air Force reserves revived their combat units in 1952, the squadron was activated as a tactical reconnaissance unit. It briefly returned to the light bomber role in 1955, but in 1957, became an airlift unit as the 733rd Troop Carrier Squadron. It was again mobilized in 1962, and continued to serve as a reserve airlift unit until it was inactivated at Hill Air Force Base, Utah on 1 January 1973.

== History ==
=== World War II ===
==== Initial organization and training ====
The squadron was activated at MacDill Field, Florida, on 15 June 1942 as the 333rd Bombardment Squadron, one of the original squadrons of the 94th Bombardment Group. The AAF had decided to concentrate training of heavy bomber units under Second Air Force, and the squadron moved to Pendleton Field, Oregon, one of that command's bases, two weeks later to begin training with the Boeing B-17 Flying Fortress. The squadron cadre received its initial training at Pendleton. It moved to different bases for Phase I (individual training) and Phase II (crew training), completing Phase III (unit training) at Pueblo Army Air Base, Colorado. The air echelon of the squadron began ferrying their aircraft to the European Theater of Operations around the first of April 1943. The ground echelon left Pueblo on 18 April for Camp Kilmer, New Jersey and the New York Port of Embarkation on 18 April. They sailed aboard the RMS Queen Elizabeth on 5 May, arriving in Scotland on 13 May.

==== Combat in the European Theater ====
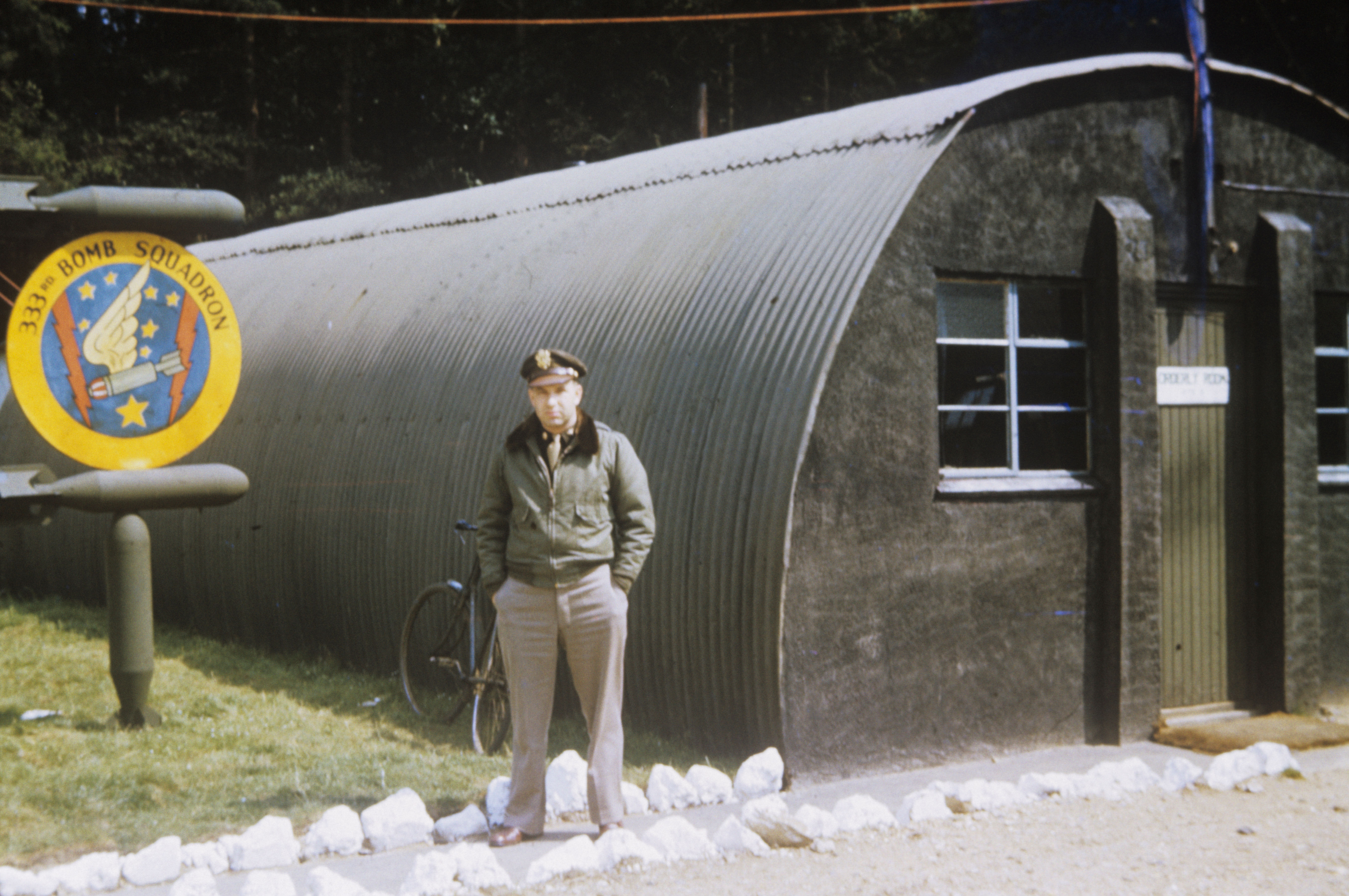
Squadron orderly room at Bury St. Edmunds (Note: This image depicts another squadron emblem. This version was apparently used earlier, but neither version received official approval. Watkens, pp. 40–41.)

The squadron began assembling at RAF Earls Colne in mid May, but Eighth Air Force decided to transfer its new Martin B-26 Marauder units from VIII Bomber Command to VIII Air Support Command and concentrate them on bases closer to the European continent. As a result, the 323d Bombardment Group moved to Earls Colne on 14 June, forcing the 94th Group and its squadrons to relocate to RAF Bury St. Edmunds, which would be its combat station for the rest of the war. It flew its first combat mission (and what would be its only mission from Earls Colne) on 13 June against the airfield at Saint-Omer, France. Until the end of the war, the squadron participated in the strategic bombing campaign against Germany. It attacked port facilities at Saint Nazaire, shipyards at Kiel, an aircraft plant at Kassel, oil facilities at Merseburg and ball bearing facilities at Eberhausen.

During an attack on the Messerschmitt factory at Regensberg on 17 August 1943, the squadron was without escort after its escorting Republic P-47 Thunderbolts reached the limit of their range. It withstood repeated attacks, first by enemy Messerschmitt Bf 109 and Focke-Wulf Fw 190 interceptors, then by Messerschmitt Bf 110 and Junkers Ju 88 night fighters, to strike its target, earning its first Distinguished Unit Citation (DUC). This was a "shuttle" mission, with the squadron recovering on bases in north Africa, rather than returning to England.

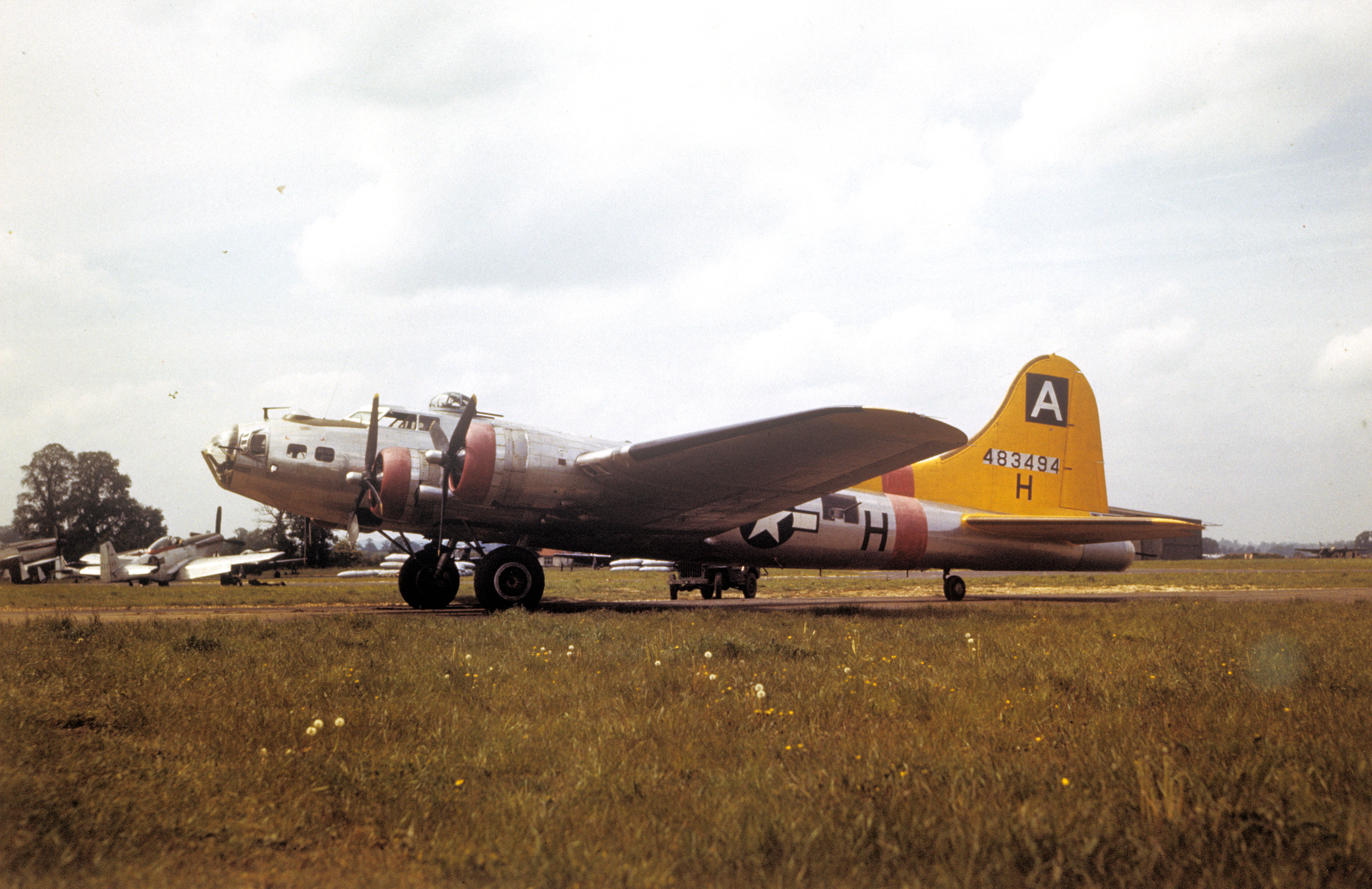
94th Bombardment Group B-17 (Note: Aircraft is Douglas Aircraft manufactured Boeing B-17G-85-DL Flying fortress, serial 44-83494. This plane survived the war and was written off at Offutt Air Force Base in February 1949. Dirkx, Marco (23 September 2025). "1944 USAF Serial Numbers". Joe Baugher’s Serial Number List.)

On 11 January 1944, it attacked a Messerschmitt aircraft parts manufacturing plant at Brunswick/Waggum Airfield. Weather conditions deteriorated during the flight to the target, preventing part of the escorting fighters from reaching the bombers and resulting in the squadron's bombers being recalled. However, the wing leader was unable to authenticate the recall message and continued to the target. In contrast, fair weather to the east of the target permitted the Luftwaffe to concentrate its fighter defenses into one of its largest defensive formations since October 1943. Despite heavy flak in the target area, the squadron bombed accurately and earned its second DUC for this action. The squadron participated in Big Week, the concentrated campaign against the German aircraft manufacturing industry from 20 to 25 February 1944. It bombed transportation, communication and petroleum industrial targets during Operation Lumberjack the final push across the Rhine and into Germany.

The squadron flew its last mission on 21 April 1945. Following V-E Day it dropped leaflets to displaced persons and German civilians on what were called "Nickling" flights The squadron was scheduled to be part of the occupation forces, but those plans were cancelled in September 1945. Starting in November, its planes were transferred to other units or flown back to the United States. Its remaining personnel sailed on the SS Lake Champlain on 12 December 1945. Upon reaching the Port of Embarkation, the squadron was inactivated.

=== Air Force reserve ===
==== Initial organization and mobilization for the Korean War ====
The squadron was again activated under Air Defense Command (ADC) at Marietta Army Air Field, Georgia in May 1947 as a air reserve unit and again assigned to the 94th Bombardment Group. Although nominally a very heavy bomber unit, It is not clear whether or not the squadron was fully staffed or equipped. In 1948 Continental Air Command (ConAC) assumed responsibility for managing reserve and Air National Guard units from ADC.

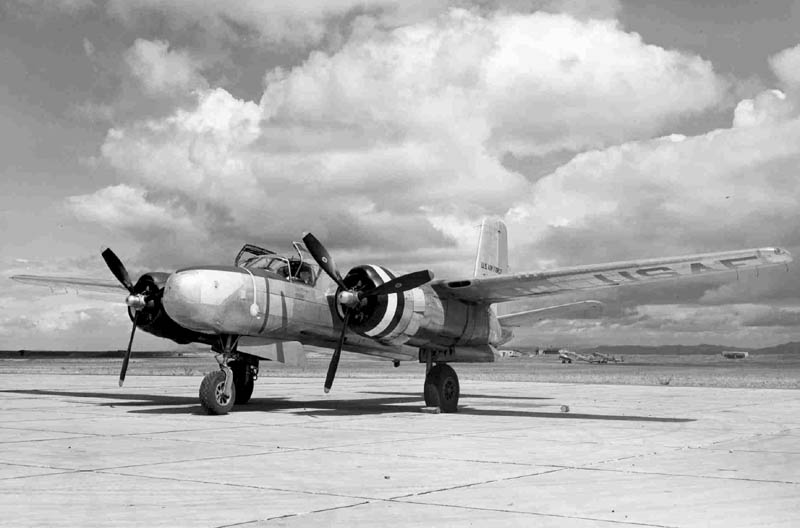
Air reserve B-26

In June 1949, the squadron was redesignated as a light bomber unit. Reserve wings were authorized four operational squadrons, rather than the three of active duty wings. However, the squadrons were manned at 25% of normal strength. The squadron began to equip with the Douglas B-26 Invader. All reserve combat units were mobilized for the Korean War. The 331st was called to active duty on 10 March 1951. Its personnel and equipment were used to bring other units up to strength, and the squadron was inactivated ten days later.

==== Reconnaissance operations ====
The squadron was reactivated at Dobbins Air Force Base in June 1952 as the 333rd Tactical Reconnaissance Squadron and equipped with RB-26 Invader photographic reconnaissance aircraft when the 94th Bombardment Wing replaced the 902d Reserve Training Wing at Dobbins. The reserve mobilization for the Korean War had left the reserve without aircraft, and the squadron only began receiving aircraft in July. In addition to its primary aircraft and obsolescent North American P-51 Mustangs, the squadron also operated a variety of trainers and transports.

In the mid-1950s, the Air Force determined that all reserve units should be designed to augment the regular forces in the event of a national emergency. However, there were six reserve flying training wings, including the 8711th Pilot Training Wing at Scott Air Force Base, Illinois, that had no mobilization mission. On 18 May 1955, the 94th Wing moved to Scott to replace the 8711th. The squadron did not move, but was inactivated as the 94th reorganized with only two tactical squadrons.

==== Airlift operations ====
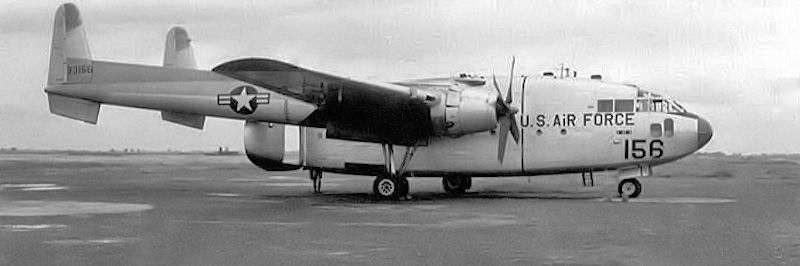
C-119 Flying Boxcar as flown by the squadron

The squadron was reactivated as the 733rd Troop Carrier Squadron (Note: The number change was required because a regular 333rd Troop Carrier Squadron was active at Sewart Air Force Base, Tennessee. Maurer, Combat Squadrons, p. 65.) in November 1957 at Hill Air Force Base, Utah, where it assumed the mission, personnel and Fairchild C-119 Flying Boxcars of the 313th Troop Carrier Squadron, which simultaneously moved on paper to Portland International Airport. At Hill, the squadron was assigned to the 452d Troop Carrier Group, which was located at Long Beach Municipal Airport, under the Dispersed Squadron Concept, under which ConAC dispersed some of its flying squadrons to separate bases in order to improve recruiting and avoid public objection to entire wings of aircraft being stationed near large population centers. The squadron used inactive duty training periods for Operation Swift Lift, transporting high priority cargo for the Air Force and Operation Ready Swap, transporting aircraft engines, between Air Materiel Command’s depots. In 1959 ConAC reorganized its flying wings under the dual deputy organization. Under this plan the squadron reported to directly to the wing, the 452nd Group was inactivated, and the squadron was reassigned to the 452nd Troop Carrier Wing.

The squadron was called to active duty for a second time on 28 October 1962 for the Cuban Missile Crisis. The 452nd Wing was not called up for this crisis, so while on active duty, the squadron was assigned to the 349th Troop Carrier Wing. It was returned to the reserve on 28 November, (Note: Caldwell dates the return date as 22 November. Caldwell, p. 191. Ravenstein agrees with Maurer a that the date was 28 November. Ravenstein, p. 132.) as tensions eased. Mobilizing dispersed units was not a problem when the entire wing was called to active service, but mobilizing a single flying squadron and elements to support it, as was done with the 733rd, proved difficult. This weakness was demonstrated in the partial mobilization of reserve units during the Berlin Crisis of 1961. To resolve this, ConAC determined to reorganize its reserve wings by establishing groups with support elements for each of its troop carrier squadrons at the start of 1962. This reorganization would facilitate mobilization of elements of wings in various combinations when needed. The mobilization of the squadron for the Cuban missile crisis delayed its reorganization until February 1963, when the 945th Troop Carrier Group was activated as the command element for the squadron, along with support elements for the 733rd.

In February 1966 ConAC determine to replace the C-119s of several of its troop carrier units, including the 733rd, with larger Douglas C-124 Globemaster II strategic airlifters. With this change in aircraft and mission, the squadron became the 733rd Military Airlift Squadron in October 1966. The squadron performed strategic airlift, including transporting equipment and supplies from the Ogden Air Materiel Area to Minuteman missile sites, and to Southeast Asia until it was inactivated in 1973 with the phaseout of the C-124.

== Lineage ==
- Constituted as the 333rd Bombardment Squadron (Heavy) on 28 January 1942

Activated on 15 June 1942
Redesignated 333rd Bombardment Squadron, Heavy c. 20 August 1943
Inactivated on 1 December 1945

- Redesignated 333rd Bombardment Squadron, Very Heavy on 13 May 1947

Activated in the reserve on 29 May 1947
Redesignated 333rd Bombardment Squadron, Light on 26 June 1949
Ordered to active service on 10 March 1951
Inactivated on 20 March 1951

- Redesignated 333rd Tactical Reconnaissance Squadron on 26 May 1952

Activated in the reserve on 14 June 1952
Inactivated on 18 May 1955

- Redesignated 733rd Troop Carrier Squadron, Medium on 24 October 1957

Activated in the reserve on 16 November 1957
Ordered to active service on 28 October 1962
Relieved from active duty on 28 November 1962
Redesignated 733rd Military Airlift Squadron (Associate) on 1 October 1966
Inactivated on 1 January 1973

=== Assignments ===
- 94th Bombardment Group, 15 June 1942 – 1 December 1945
- 94th Bombardment Group, 29 May 1947 – 20 March 1951
- 94th Tactical Reconnaissance Group, 14 June 1952 – 18 May 1955
- 452nd Troop Carrier Group, 16 November 1957
- 452nd Troop Carrier Wing, 14 April 1959
- 349th Troop Carrier Wing, 28 October 1962
- 452nd Troop Carrier Wing, 28 November 1962
- 945th Troop Carrier Group (later 945th Military Airlift Group), 11 February 1963 – 1 January 1973

=== Stations ===
- MacDill Field, Florida, 15 June 1942
- Pendleton Field, Oregon, 29 June 1942
- Davis-Monthan Field, Arizona, 29 August 1942
- Biggs Field, Texas, 1 November 1942
- Pueblo Army Air Base, Colorado, 3 January-17 April 1943
- RAF Earls Colne (AAF-358), England, 11 May 1943
- RAF Bury St. Edmunds (AAF-468), England, c. 13 June 1943 – 22 November 1945
- Camp Kilmer, New Jersey, c. 27–29 November 1945
- Marietta Army Air Field (later Marietta Air Force Base, Dobbins Air Force Base), Georgia, 29 May 1947 – 20 March 1951
- Dobbins Air Force Base, Georgia, 14 June 1952 – 18 May 1955
- Hill Air Force Base, Utah, 16 November 1957 – 1 January 1973

=== Aircraft ===
- Boeing B-17 Flying Fortress, 1942–1945
- Fairchild C-119 Flying Boxcar, 1962–1965
- Douglas C-124 Globemaster II, 1965–1973

=== Awards and campaigns ===
Award streamer	Award	Dates	Notes
	Distinguished Unit Citation	17 August 1943	333rd Bombardment Squadron, Germany
	Distinguished Unit Citation	11 January 1944	333rd Bombardment Squadron, Germany
	Vietnamese Gallantry Cross with Palm	1 January 1967-30 September 1972	733rd Military Airlift Squadron

Campaign Streamer	Campaign	Dates	Notes
	Air Offensive, Europe	11 May 1943–5 June 1944	333rd Bombardment Squadron
	Air Combat, EAME Theater	11 May 1943–11 May 1945	333rd Bombardment Squadron
	Normandy	6 June 1944–24 July 1944	333rd Bombardment Squadron
	Central Europe	22 March 1944–21 May 1945	333rd Bombardment Squadron
	Northern France	25 July 1944–14 September 1944	333rd Bombardment Squadron
	Rhineland	15 September 1944–21 March 1945	333rd Bombardment Squadron
	Ardennes-Alsace	16 December 1944–25 January 1945	333rd Bombardment Squadron

== See also ==
- B-17 Flying Fortress units of the United States Army Air Forces
- List of A-26 Invader operators
