= 927th Air Refueling Wing =

US Air Force unit

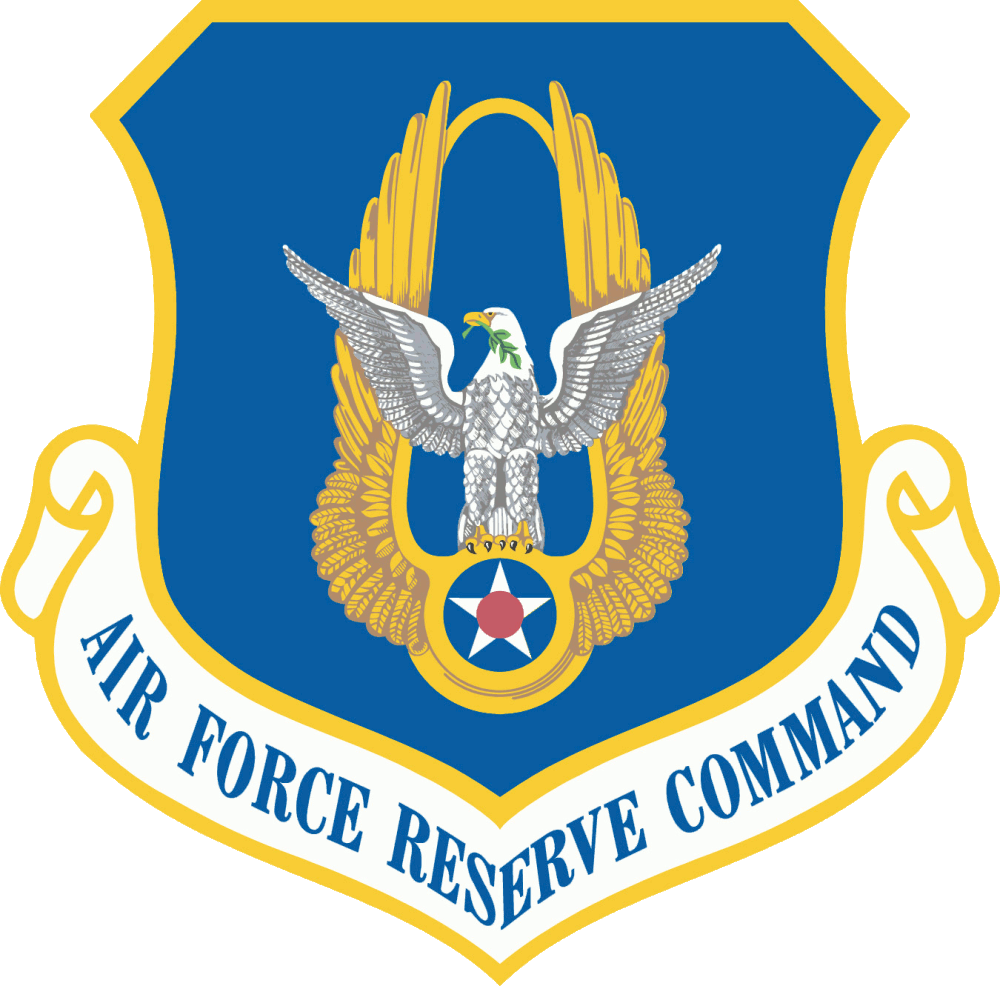
927th Air Refueling Wing

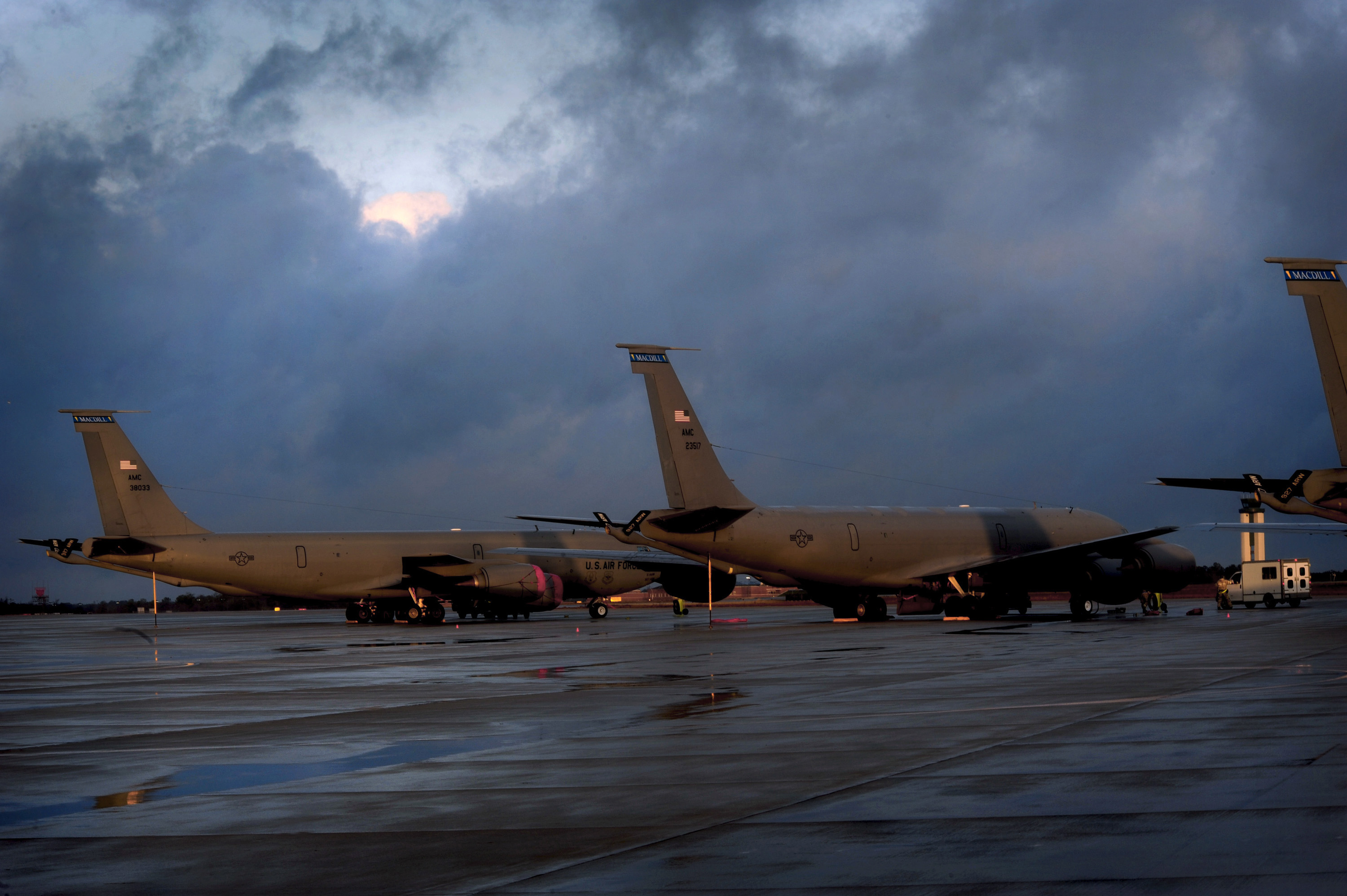
- 6th Air Refueling Wing KC-135R Stratotankers concurrently flown by the 927th Air Refueling Wing. The aircraft carry unit markings for both wings.
- Active: 1963–present
- Country: United States
- Branch: United States Air Force
- Type: Wing
- Role: Aerial refueling
- Part of: Air Force Reserve Command
- Garrison/HQ: MacDill Air Force Base, Florida
- Engagements: Operation Desert Storm; Operation Deny Flight; Operation Enduring Freedom
- Decorations: Air Force Outstanding Unit Award; Republic of Vietnam Gallantry Cross with Palm
- Website: https://www.927arw.afrc.af.mil/

Commanders
- Current commander: Colonel James D. Akers II
- Deputy Commander: Colonel Brent Murrell
- Command Chief: Chief Master Sergeant Vishal M. Rose

Insignia
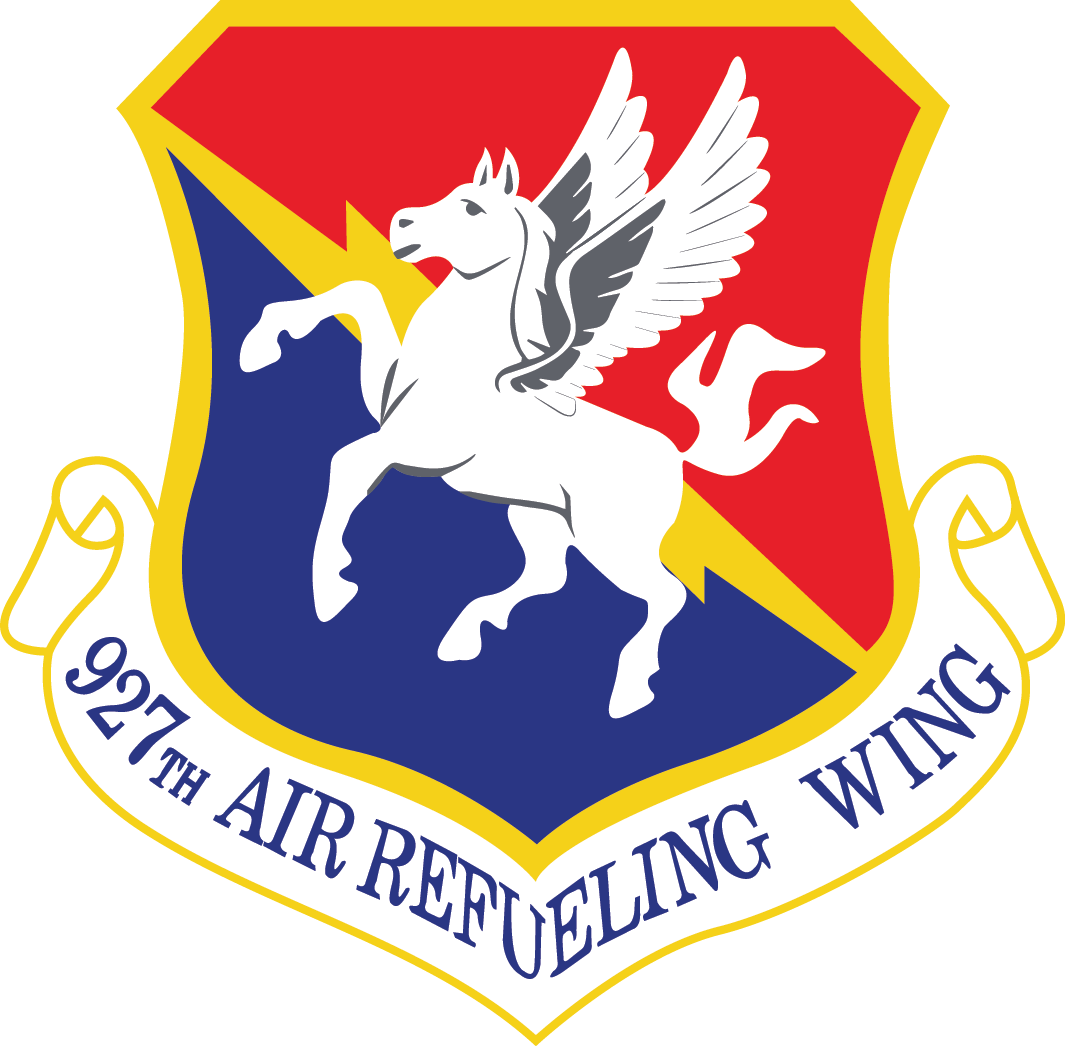
- 927th Air Refueling Wing emblem (Note: Approved 5 June 1995.)

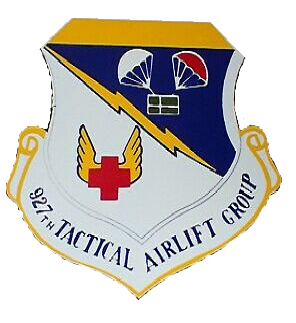
- 927th Tactical Airlift Group emblem

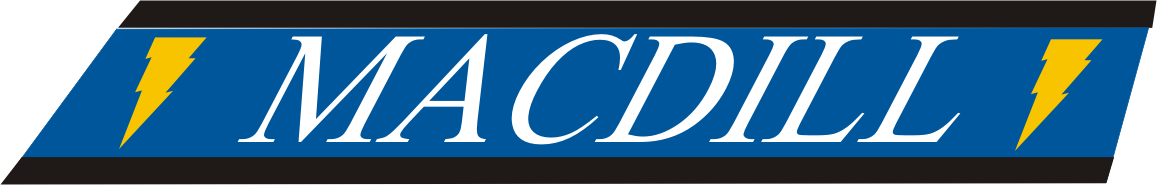
- Tail stripe

Aircraft flown
- Tanker: KC-135 Stratotanker

The 927th Air Refueling Wing is a combat coded Air Reserve Component wing of the United States Air Force. It is assigned to the Fourth Air Force of Air Force Reserve Command and is stationed at MacDill Air Force Base, Florida.

The wing has over 900 personnel, with approximately 200 full-time officer and enlisted Air Reserve Technicians and 700 part-time Traditional Reservist officers and airmen. An associate unit of the 6th Air Refueling Wing of the Air Mobility Command (AMC), both units share and fly the same Boeing KC-135R Stratotanker aircraft at MacDill and at forward deployed locations. The 927th also mirrors the 6th in nearly every aircraft maintenance and mission support function with parallel squadrons. The only activity not replicated in the 927th is a group level activity analogous to the 6th's medical group which operates the MacDill Air Force Base clinic. 927th medical personnel consist of an aerospace medicine squadron and an aeromedical staging squadron.

If mobilized to active duty, the 927th is gained by AMC.

== Mission ==
The mission of the 927 ARW is to provide a dedicated and prepared Total Force Team to fly, fight and win in air, space and cyberspace.

The wing directly supports the totally integrated Air Force mission by way of extending the global reach of United States air power through mission ready personnel and equipment while providing global air refueling and airlift operations.

== Units ==
The wing consists of 3 groups and 10 subordinate units including:

- 927th Operations Group
  - 63d Air Refueling Squadron
  - 927th Operations Support Squadron
  - 45th Aeromedical Evacuation Squadron
- 927th Maintenance Group
  - 927th Maintenance Squadron
  - 927th Aircraft Maintenance Squadron
- 927th Mission Support Group
  - 927th Security Forces Squadron
  - 927th Logistics Readiness Squadron
  - 927th Force Support Squadron
- Other Activities
  - 927th Aeromedical Staging Squadron
  - 927th Aerospace Medicine Squadron

== History ==
=== Need for reserve troop carrier groups ===
After May 1959, the Air Force Reserve flying force consisted of 45 troop carrier squadrons assigned to 15 troop carrier wings. (Note: There were an additional four rescue squadrons not assigned to the wings. Cantwell, p. 156.) The squadrons were not all located with their parent wings, but were spread over thirty-five Air Force, Navy and civilian airfields under what was called the Detached Squadron Concept. The concept offered several advantages. Communities were more likely to accept the smaller squadrons than the large wings and the location of separate squadrons in smaller population centers would facilitate recruiting and manning. However, under this concept, all support organizations were located with the wing headquarters. Although this was not a problem when the entire wing was called to active service, mobilizing a single flying squadron and elements to support it proved difficult. This weakness was demonstrated in the partial mobilization of Air Force Reserve units during the Berlin Crisis of 1961. To resolve this, at the start of 1962, Continental Air Command, (ConAC) determined to reorganize its Air Force Reserve wings by establishing groups with support elements for each of its troop carrier squadrons. This reorganization would facilitate mobilization of elements of wings in various combinations when needed.

=== Activation of the 927th Troop Carrier Group ===
As a result of these organizational changes, the 927th Troop Carrier Group (927 TCG) was established at what was then Selfridge Air Force Base, Michigan on 11 February 1963 as the headquarters for the 63d Troop Carrier Squadron (63 TCS), with the 63 TCS having been stationed at Selfridge AFB since November 1957. Along with group headquarters, a Combat Support Squadron, a Materiel Squadron, and a Tactical Infirmary were organized to support the 63 TCS.

If mobilized to active duty, the 927 TCG was operationally gained by Tactical Air Command (TAC), which was also responsible for its training. The 927 TCG's mission was to organize, recruit and train Air Force Reservists in the tactical airlift of airborne forces, their equipment and supplies and delivery of these forces and materials by airdrop, landing or cargo extraction systems.

The 927 TCG was one of three Fairchild C-119 Flying Boxcar troop carrier groups assigned to the 403d Troop Carrier Wing (403 TCW) at Selfridge AFB in 1963. The other groups were geographically separated units (GSUs) consisting of the 928th Troop Carrier Group (928 TCG) at O'Hare Air Reserve Station at O'Hare International Airport, Illinois and the 929th Troop Carrier Group (29 TCG) at Davis Field, Oklahoma.

The 927 TCG was redesignated the 927th Tactical Airlift Group (927 TAG) in 1967 and flew the C-119 until 1969. The group was then redesignated as the 927th Tactical Air Support Group (927 TASG) on 18 June 1969 and flew the Cessna U-3 Blue Canoe aircraft until 1971.

The group was once again redesignated as the 927th Tactical Airlift Group (927 TAG) on 29 June 1971 and converted to the Lockheed C-130A Hercules aircraft. Days later, on 1 July 1971, Selfridge Air Force Base was transferred to the Michigan Air National Guard and was renamed Selfridge Air National Guard Base, becoming the first major active Air Force base to come under control of the Air National Guard. The 927 TAG then became an Air Force Reserve (AFRES) tenant command at Selfridge ANGB.

During the Vietnam War, the 927 TAG's flying squadron routinely ferried dismantled aircraft and delivered equipment and supplies to South Vietnam with its C-119 and later C-130 aircraft. Unit personnel also supported humanitarian relief efforts during the 1973 New York and Pennsylvania floods, as well as hurricane disaster relief to Honduras in 1974 and for Hurricane Hugo victims in 1989.

In 1975, with TAC's divestment of the C-130 fleet, the operational gaining command for the 927 TAG shifted to the Military Airlift Command (MAC).

During 1990, the 927 TAG deployed more than 400 airmen, plus unit aircraft and supplies, for six months to the Middle East in support of Operation Desert Shield and Operation Desert Storm.

=== Air Refueling ===
1992 saw numerous changes for the unit. The 927 TAG relinquished their C-130A aircraft, converted to an air refueling mission with Boeing KC-135E Stratotanker aircraft, and was redesignated the 927th Air Refueling Group (927 ARG). This also coincided with major organizational changes across the Air Force the same year with Strategic Air Command (SAC), the former operator of KC-135 aircraft, being disestablished, and all KC-135 assets other than those in Alaska, Hawaii, Europe, and Asia being transferred to the newly established Air Mobility Command (AMC). As a result, if mobilized to active duty, the 927 ARG would now be operationally-gained by AMC.

On 1 October 1994, the 927 ARG was redesignated as the 927th Air Refueling Wing (927 ARW). From 1995 through 2004, the wing participated in numerous missions, operations and exercises around the world, including:

- Operation Northern Watch
- Somalia Pullout
- Atlantic Express
- Airlift to Soto Cano Air Base, Honduras
- AWACS support to Geilenkirchen, Germany
- Red Flag exercises at Nellis Air Force Base, Nevada
- Snowbird Support
- Airlift of other Air Force Reserve assets from Rhein-Main Air Base, Germany to Eglin AFB Auxiliary Field #3/Duke Field, Florida
- Airlift to Ramstein Air Base, Germany
- Operation Pitch Black
- Pacific Express to Kadena Air Base, Japan
- Phoenix Tusk to Bangor Air National Guard Base, Maine
- Deployments to Italy and France in support of Operation Deny Flight, Operation Decisive Endeavor, and Operation Deliberate Guard/Force, enforcing the "no fly zone" over the former Yugoslavia

In 1997, the Air Force Reserve (AFRES) ceased to be a Field Operating Agency of Headquarters, Air Force (HAF) and became its own Major Command (MAJCOM), renamed Air Force Reserve Command (AFRC). The letters "AFRC" replaced the letters "AFRES" on the tails of all 927 ARW aircraft, but operational relationships with AMC remained unchanged. The wing also commenced transition from the legacy KC-135E to the Boeing KC-135R Stratotanker PACER CRAG variant.

During 1999, the 927th responded to Presidential Selected Recall Callup (PSRC) authority, deploying members on extended active duty in support of Operation Noble Anvil and NATO's Operation Allied Force.

The wing also responded within one hour after the 11 September attacks in 2001, with the wing launching from their home station of Selfridge Air National Guard Base and quickly providing refueling services for USAF fighter aircraft patrolling the North Central United States and other concurrent support of Homeland Defense as part of Operation Noble Eagle. The 927th Security Forces Squadron was also initially activated for 12 months and extended for an additional 12 months in support of Operations Noble Eagle and Enduring Freedom. The wing continued to support Operation Enduring Freedom (Global War on Terrorism) through 2014, Operation Freedom's Sentinel through 2021, and continues to remain actively engaged in supporting Operation Noble Eagle (Homeland Defense).

=== Relocation to MacDill AFB ===
In its 2005 Base Realignment and Closure Commission (BRAC) recommendations, DoD recommended to realign Selfridge ANGB. Under this recommendation, the 927 ARW would transfer its eight unit-owned KC-135R aircraft to the 127th Wing (127 WG) of the Michigan Air National Guard, also based at Selfridge ANGB. The 927 ARW would then realign to an Active-Reserve Associate arrangement with the then-6th Air Mobility Wing (6 AMW) at MacDill Air Force Base, Florida in order to capture Air Force Reserve experience in the southeastern United States and enhance the combined units' overall capability.

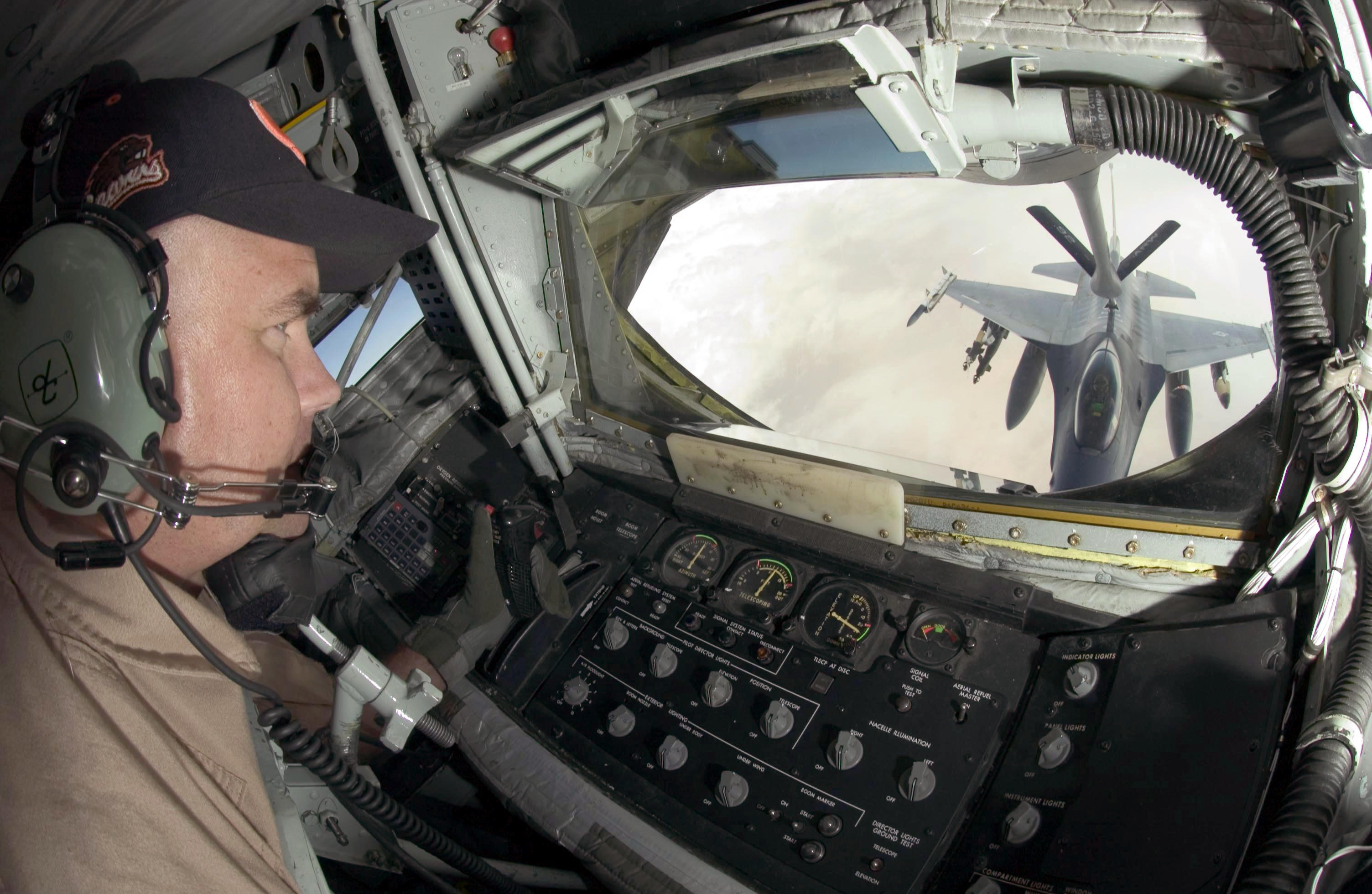
USAF KC-135R boom operator view from boom control station

In another recommendation, DoD recommended realigning Grand Forks Air Force Base, North Dakota, redistributing four of the 319th Air Refueling Wing's KC-135R aircraft to MacDill AFB. The enlarged 6 AMW would then host an Air Force Reserve association arrangement with manpower realigned from Selfridge ANGB, with both units operating, maintaining and sharing the same (with the increase of aircraft reassigned from Grand Forks AFB) sixteen (16) KC-135R aircraft.

In 2007, the wing began moving from Selfridge ANGB to MacDill AFB and formally established itself there on 1 May 2008.

In late 2014, the 6 AMW activated a second active duty air refueling squadron. While the 927 ARW continued to have only its single air refueling squadron, the wing benefitted from an increase in Primary Aircraft Authorized (PAA) for 6 AMW from seventeen (17) to twenty-four (24) KC-135R aircraft.

In 2019, the 6 AMW lost its resident airlift squadron and its three C-37A Gulfstream V aircraft. As a consequence, the 6 AMW reverted to its previous designation from 2001 as the 6th Air Refueling Wing (6 ARW).

On 21 December 2021, the Secretary of the Air Force announced that the 6 ARW would become Main Operating Base 6 (MOB 6) for the new KC-46A Pegasus air refueling aircraft, eventually replacing the extant twenty-four (24) KC-135R Stratotanker aircraft at MacDill AFB with an equal number of KC-46A aircraft. Arrival of the first KC-46A at MacDill AFB is anticipated in late 2023/early 2024. As part of the 6 ARW's transition, the 927 ARW will also transition to the KC-46A.

== Lineage ==
- Established as the 927th Troop Carrier Group, Medium and activated on 15 January 1963 (not organized)

Organized in the reserve on 11 February 1963
Redesignated 927th Tactical Airlift Group on 1 July 1967
Redesignated 927th Tactical Air Support Group on 18 June 1969
Redesignated 927th Tactical Airlift Group on 29 June 1971
Redesignated 927th Airlift Group on 1 February 1992
Redesignated 927th Air Refueling Group on 1 June 1992
Redesignated 927th Air Refueling Wing on 1 October 1994

=== Assignments ===
- Continental Air Command, 15 January 1963 (not organized)
- 403d Troop Carrier Wing, 11 February 1963
- Central Air Force Reserve Region, 31 December 1969
- 403d Composite Wing (later 403d Tactical Airlift Wing), 1 June 1970
- 459th Tactical Airlift Wing, 15 March 1976
- 440th Tactical Airlift Wing (later 440th Airlift Wing), 1 July 1981
- 434th Wing (later 434th Air Refueling Wing), 1 August 1992
- Twenty-Second Air Force, 1 October 1994
- Fourth Air Force, 1 April 1997 – present

=== Components ===
- 927th Operations Group: 1 August 1992 – present
- 63d Troop Carrier Squadron (later 63d Tactical Airlift Squadron, 63d Tactical Air Support Squadron, 63d Tactical Airlift Squadron, 63d Air Refueling Squadron): 11 February 1963 – 1 August 1992

=== Stations ===
- Selfridge Air Force Base (later Selfridge Air National Guard Base), Michigan, 11 February 1963 - 30 April 2008
- MacDill Air Force Base, Florida, 1 May 2008 – present

=== Aircraft ===
- Fairchild C-119 Flying Boxcar, 1963–1969
- Cessna U-3 Blue Canoe, 1969–1971
- Lockheed C-130 Hercules, 1971–1992
- Boeing KC-135 Stratotanker, 1992–present
