= 928th Airlift Wing =

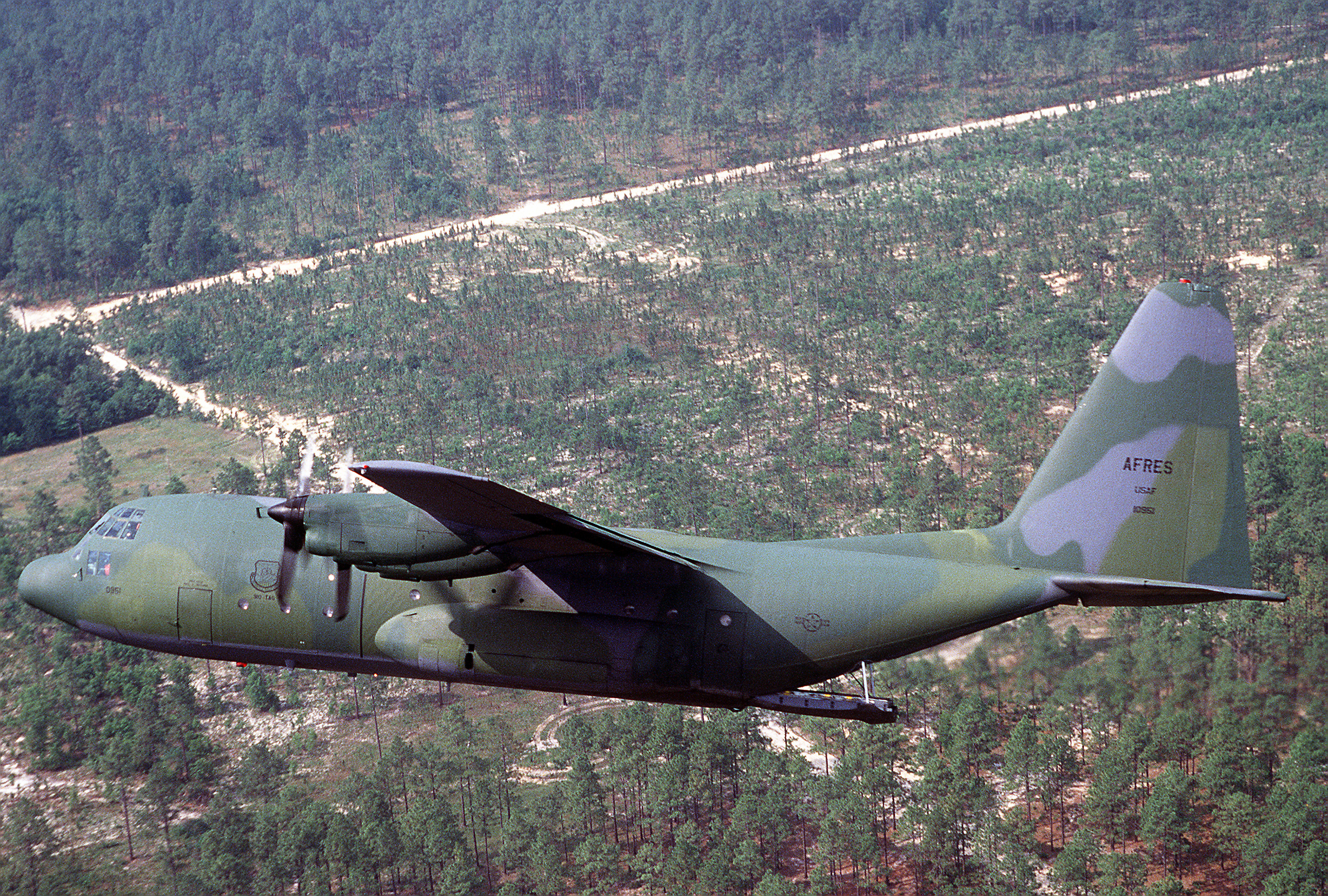
- An Air Force Reserve C-130 Hercules approaches a drop zone during Airlift Rodeo '90
- Active: 1963-1997
- Country: United States
- Branch: United States Air Force
- Role: Airlift
- Part of: Air Force Reserve Command

Insignia
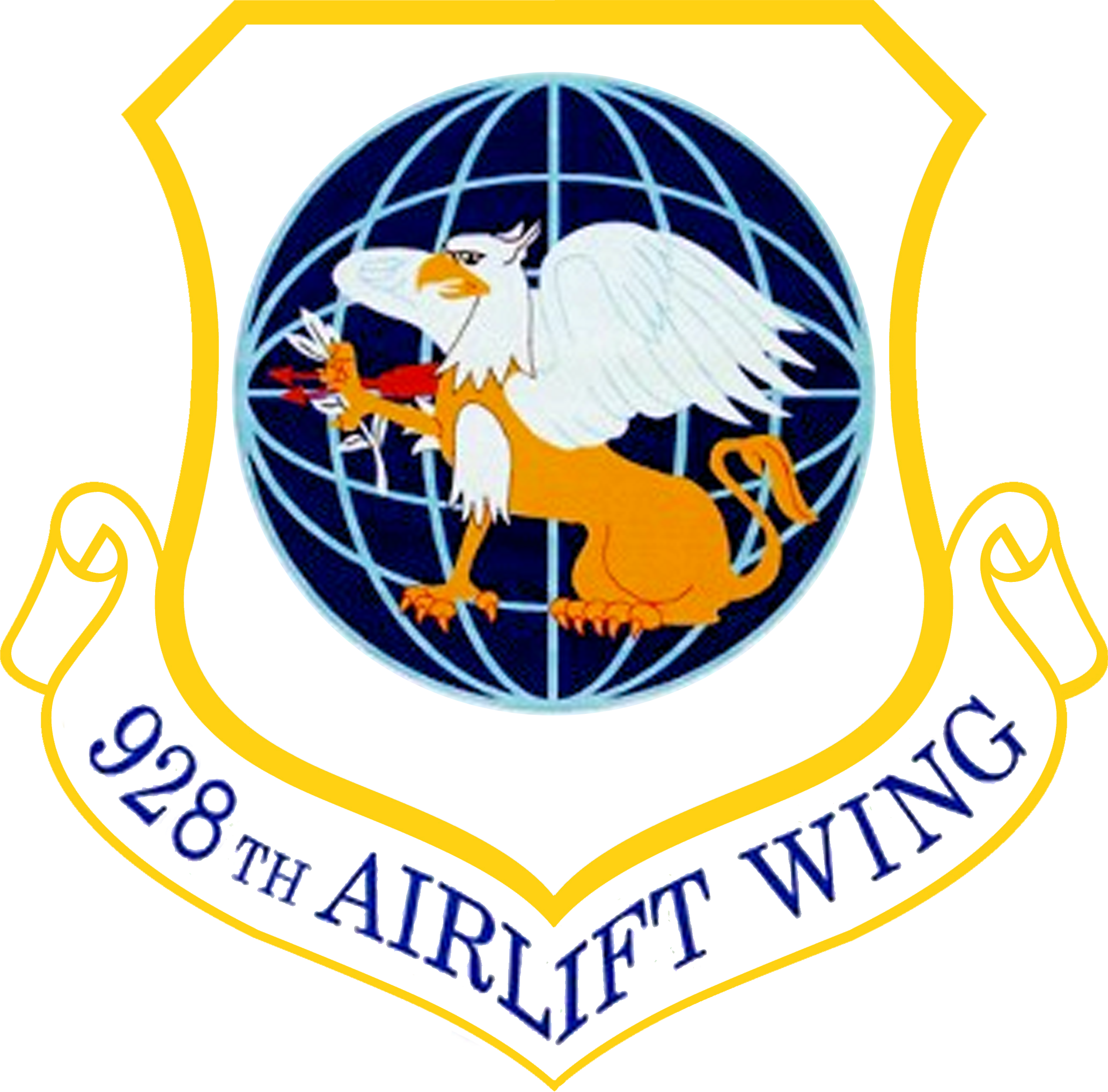
- 928th Airlift Wing emblem

O'Hare Air Reserve Station
- Part of United States Air Force Reserves

Location
- Coordinates: 41°59′24″N 87°53′42″W

The 928th Airlift Wing is an inactive United States Air Force Reserve unit. It was last active with the Twenty-Second Air Force at O'Hare Air Reserve Station, Illinois, where it was inactivated on 1 July 1997.

== History ==
=== Need for reserve troop carrier groups ===
After May 1959, the Air Force Reserve flying force consisted of 45 troop carrier squadrons assigned to 15 troop carrier wings. (Note: There were an additional four rescue squadrons not assigned to the wings. Cantwell, p. 156) The squadrons were not all located with their parent wings, but were spread over thirty-five Air Force, Navy and civilian airfields under what was called the Detached Squadron Concept. The concept offered several advantages. Communities were more likely to accept the smaller squadrons than the large wings and the location of separate squadrons in smaller population centers would facilitate recruiting and manning.

However, under this concept, all support organizations were located with the wing headquarters. Although this was not a problem when the entire wing was called to active service, mobilizing a single flying squadron and elements to support it proved difficult. This weakness was demonstrated in the partial mobilization of reserve units during the Berlin Crisis of 1961. To resolve this, at the start of 1962, Continental Air Command, (ConAC) determined to reorganize its reserve wings by establishing groups with support elements for each of its troop carrier squadrons. This reorganization would facilitate mobilization of elements of wings in various combinations when needed.

The unit motto was "Deeds not words."

=== Activation of the 928th Troop Carrier Group ===
As a result, the 928th Troop Carrier Group was activated at O'Hare International Airport, Illinois on 11 February 1963 as the headquarters for the 64th Troop Carrier Squadron, which had been stationed there since March 1958. Along with group headquarters, a Combat Support Squadron, Materiel Squadron and a Tactical Infirmary were organized to support the 64th.

If mobilized, the group was gained by Tactical Air Command (TAC), which was also responsible for its training. Its mission was to organize, recruit and train Air Force Reservists in the tactical airlift of airborne forces, their equipment and supplies and delivery of these forces and materials by airdrop, landing or cargo extraction systems. The group was equipped with Fairchild C-119 Flying Boxcars for TAC airlift operations.

The group was one of three C-119 groups assigned to the 403d Troop Carrier Wing in 1963, the others being the 927th Troop Carrier Group, at Selfridge Air Force Base, Michigan and the 929th Troop Carrier Group at Davis Field, Oklahoma.

In 1963, the group moved US troops to the Dominican Republic and airlifted Christmas gifts destined for US servicemen in Vietnam. After a period of uncertainty in 1970, the unit was redesignated as a Tactical Airlift Group and later reassigned to the 440th Tactical Airlift Wing at Billy Mitchell Field, Wisconsin, although remaining at O'Hare. The 928th received newer Lockheed C-130A Hercules and in 1978 responded to a severe weather emergency in New England, flying equipment and supplies into several areas after severe blizzards brought life on the coast to a standstill. In 1979, the 928th started a regular rotation with other Air Force Reserve and Air National Guard C-130 units under Operation CORONET OAK that took them to Howard AFB, Panama to support the operations of the U.S. Southern Command (USSOUTHCOM) across Central and South America. Rotations to the Central American country lasted 2–3 weeks at a time.

The 928 TAG was upgraded to first-line C-130H transports during the 1980s, retiring the first-generation C-130As. Elements of the group were part of Operations Desert Shield in 1990 and Desert Storm in 1991, with aircraft, flight crews, maintenance specialists and a variety of support specialists deployed to operating locations in several Persian Gulf States where they provided airlift support to U.S. and coalition military forces.

In 1992, with inactivation of Military Airlift Command (MAC), operational claimancy for the 928th shifted to the newly established Air Mobility Command (AMC) and the unit was redesignated the 928th Airlift Group.

In 1994, the 928th was expanded to a wing level organization and redesignated as the 928th Airlift Wing (928 AW). The 928th subsequently took part in Operation Uphold Democracy (Haiti) and Operation Safe Borders (support of U.S. Army forces in Honduras). .

BRAC 93 shut down the Air Force Reserve presence at O'Hare in 1997 and the 928th's aircraft were reassigned to Air Force Reserve C-130 units at Dobbins Air Reserve Base, Georgia and Peterson Air Force Base, Colorado.

== Lineage ==
- Established as the 928th Troop Carrier Group, Medium and activated on 15 January 1963 (not organized)

Organized in the Reserve on 11 February 1963
Redesignated 928th Tactical Airlift Group on 1 July 1967
Redesignated 928th Airlift Group on 1 February 1992
Redesignated 928th Airlift Wing on 1 October 1994
Inactivated on 1 July 1997

=== Assignments ===
- Continental Air Command, 15 January 1963 (not organized)
- 403d Troop Carrier Wing (later 403d Tactical Airlift Wing), 11 February 1963
- Eastern Air Force Reserve Region, 1 December 1969
- 440th Tactical Airlift Wing (later 440th Airlift Wing), 17 September 1970
- Twenty-Second Air Force, 1 October 1994 – 1 July 1997

=== Components ===
- 928th Operations Group, 1 October 1994 – 1 July 1997
- 64th Troop Carrier Squadron (later 64th Tactical Airlift Squadron, 64th Airlift Squadron), 11 February 1963 – 1 October 1994

=== Stations ===
- O'Hare International Airport (later O'Hare Air Reserve Station), Illinois, 11 February 1963 – 1 July 1997

=== Aircraft ===
- Fairchild C-119 Flying Boxcar, 1963–1970
- Lockheed C-130 Hercules, 1970–1997
