= 65th Airlift Squadron =

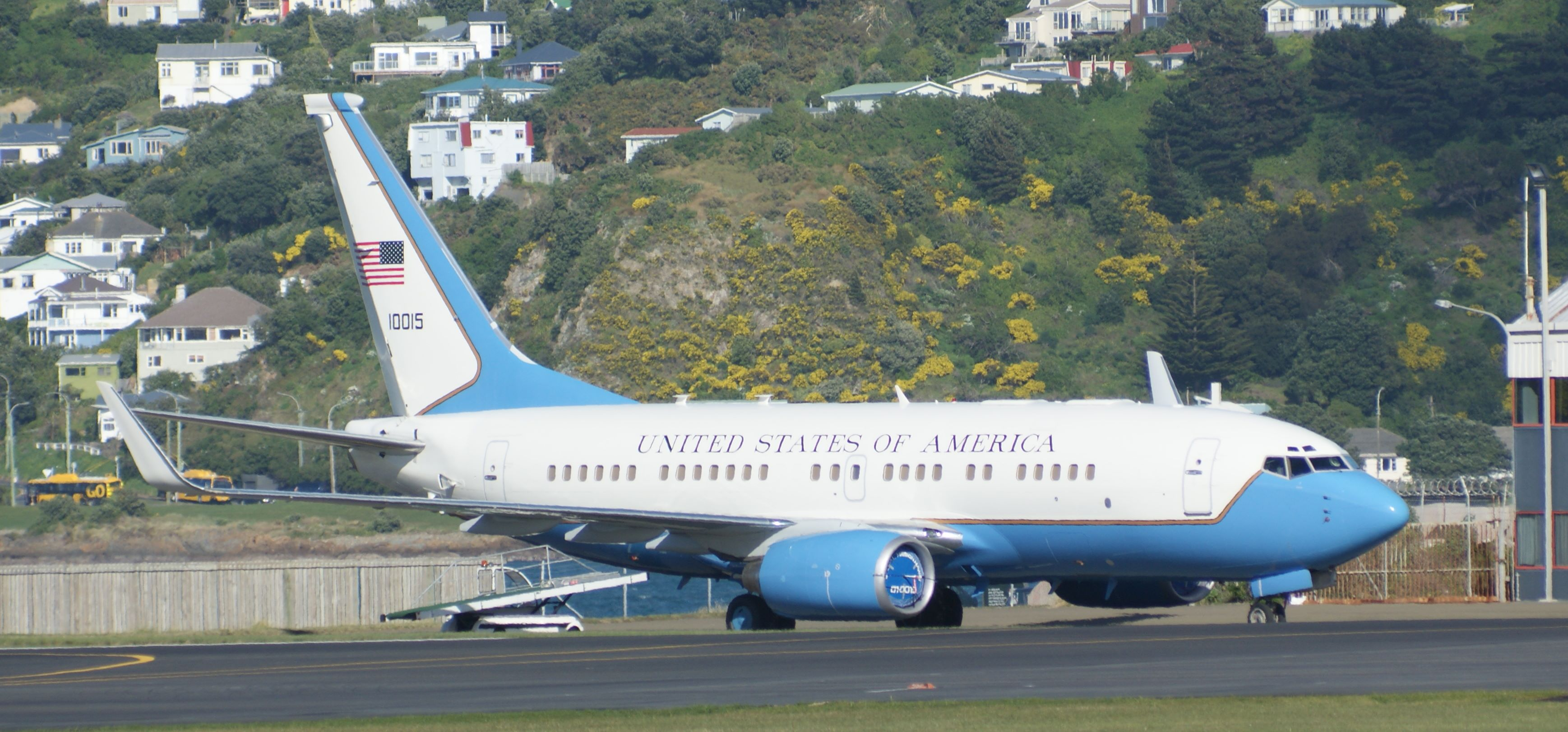
- Squadron C-40 Clipper at Wellington Airport
- Active: 1942–1946; 1947–1966; 1992–present
- Country: United States
- Branch: United States Air Force
- Role: Airlift
- Part of: Pacific Air Forces
- Garrison/HQ: Joint Base Pearl Harbor–Hickam
- Engagements: Southwest Pacific Theater; Korean War
- Decorations: Distinguished Unit Citation; Air Force Outstanding Unit Award; Philippine Presidential Unit Citation; Republic of Korea Presidential Unit Citation

Insignia
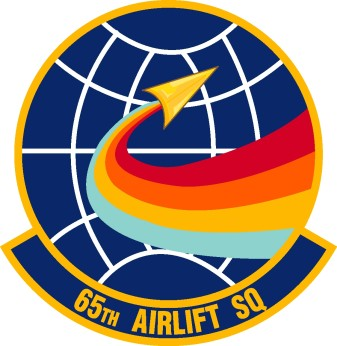
- 65th Airlift Squadron emblem (approved 27 November 1992)

The 65th Airlift Squadron is part of the 15th Wing at Joint Base Pearl Harbor–Hickam, Hawaii. It operates C-37 aircraft providing executive airlift in the Pacific theater.

== Mission ==
The squadron's mission is to provide global airlift to Commander, US Pacific Command and Commander, Pacific Air Forces, as well as distinguished visitor missions.

== History ==
=== World War II ===
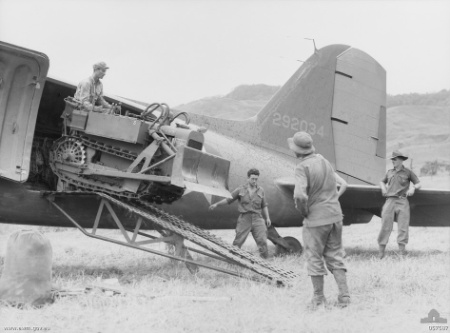
New Guinea. A bulldozer arrives for use on the Kaiapit strip, September 1943. The aircraft is C-47A 42-92034 of the 65th Troop carrier Squadron.

The 65th conducted aerial transportation and evacuation in the Pacific Theater of Operations from 26 July 1943-c. August 1945.

=== Reserve operation and Korean War mobilization ===
In Korea, the 65th carried out aerial evacuation and transportation operations between 9 May 1952 and 31 December 1952.

=== Pacific airlift ===
Beginning in 1992, flew specially configured C-135s, and later C-37 and C-40 aircraft, to provide global airlift to Commander, US Pacific Command and Commander, Pacific Air Forces, as well as distinguished visitor missions.

== Lineage ==
- Constituted as the 65th Troop Carrier Squadron on 7 December 1942

Activated on 12 December 1942
Inactivated on 27 January 1946

- Activated in the reserve on 9 August 1947

Redesignated 65th Troop Carrier Squadron, Medium on 27 June 1949
Ordered to active service on 1 April 1951
Inactivated on 1 January 1953

- Activated in the reserve on 1 January 1953

Ordered to active service on 28 Oct 1962
Relieved from active service on 28 Nov 1962
Discontinued and inactivated on 1 July 1966

- Redesignated 65th Airlift Squadron on 20 February 1992

Activated on 10 March 1992

=== Assignments ===
- 403d Troop Carrier Group, 12 Dec 1942
- Fifth Air Force, 26 July 1943
- 54th Troop Carrier Wing, 13 August 1943
- 433d Troop Carrier Group, 9 November 1943
- 403d Troop Carrier Group, 20 February 1945 – 27 January 1946
- 419th Troop Carrier Group, 9 August 1947
- 403 Troop Carrier Group, 27 June 1949 – 1 January 1953
- 403 Troop Carrier Group, 1 January 1953
- 442d Troop Carrier Group, 16 November 1957
- 403d Troop Carrier Wing, 14 April 1959
- 929th Troop Carrier Group, 11 January 1963 – 1 July 1966
- 15th Air Base Wing, 10 March 1992
- 15th Operations Group, 13 April 1992 – present

=== Stations ===
- Bowman Field, Kentucky, 12 December 1942
- Alliance Army Air Field, Nebraska, 18 December 1942
- Pope Field, North Carolina, 3 May 1943
- Baer Field Indiana, 19 June–14 July 1943
- Port Moresby, New Guinea, 26 July 1943 (air echelon operated from Tsili Tsili, New Guinea after 18 September 1943)
- Nadzab Airfield Complex, New Guinea, 9 October 1943 (air echelon operated from Tsili Tsili, New Guinea until 31 October 1943 and from Tadji, Papua New Guinea, 3 May–2 June 1944)
- Biak, 18 October 1944 (air echelon operated from Hill Field, Mindoro, after 24 January 1945)
- Morotai, Netherlands East Indies, 27 February 1945
- Dulag Airfield, Leyte, Philippines, 15 July 1945
- Clark Field, Luzon, Philippines, 27 January 1946
- Richmond Army Air Base, Virginia, 9 August 1947
- Portland International Airport, Oregon, 27 June 1949 – 29 March 1952
- Ashiya Air Base, Japan, 14 April 1952 – 1 January 1953
- Portland International Airport, Oregon, 1 January 1953
- Paine Air Force Base, Washington, 15 April 1955
- Davis Field, Oklahoma, 16 November 1957 – 1 July 1966
- Hickam Air Force Base (later Joint Base Pearl Harbor–Hickam, Hawaii, 10 Mar 1992 – present)

=== Aircraft ===
- Douglas C-47 Skytrain (1943–1945)
- Curtiss C-46 Commando (1944–1945, 1947–1952)
- Fairchild C-119 Flying Boxcar (1952, 1953–1966)
- Boeing C-135 Stratolifter (1992–2003)
- Gulfstream C-37A Gulfstream V (2002–present)
- Boeing C-40B Clipper (2003–2019)
