= 403rd Wing =

403rd Wing

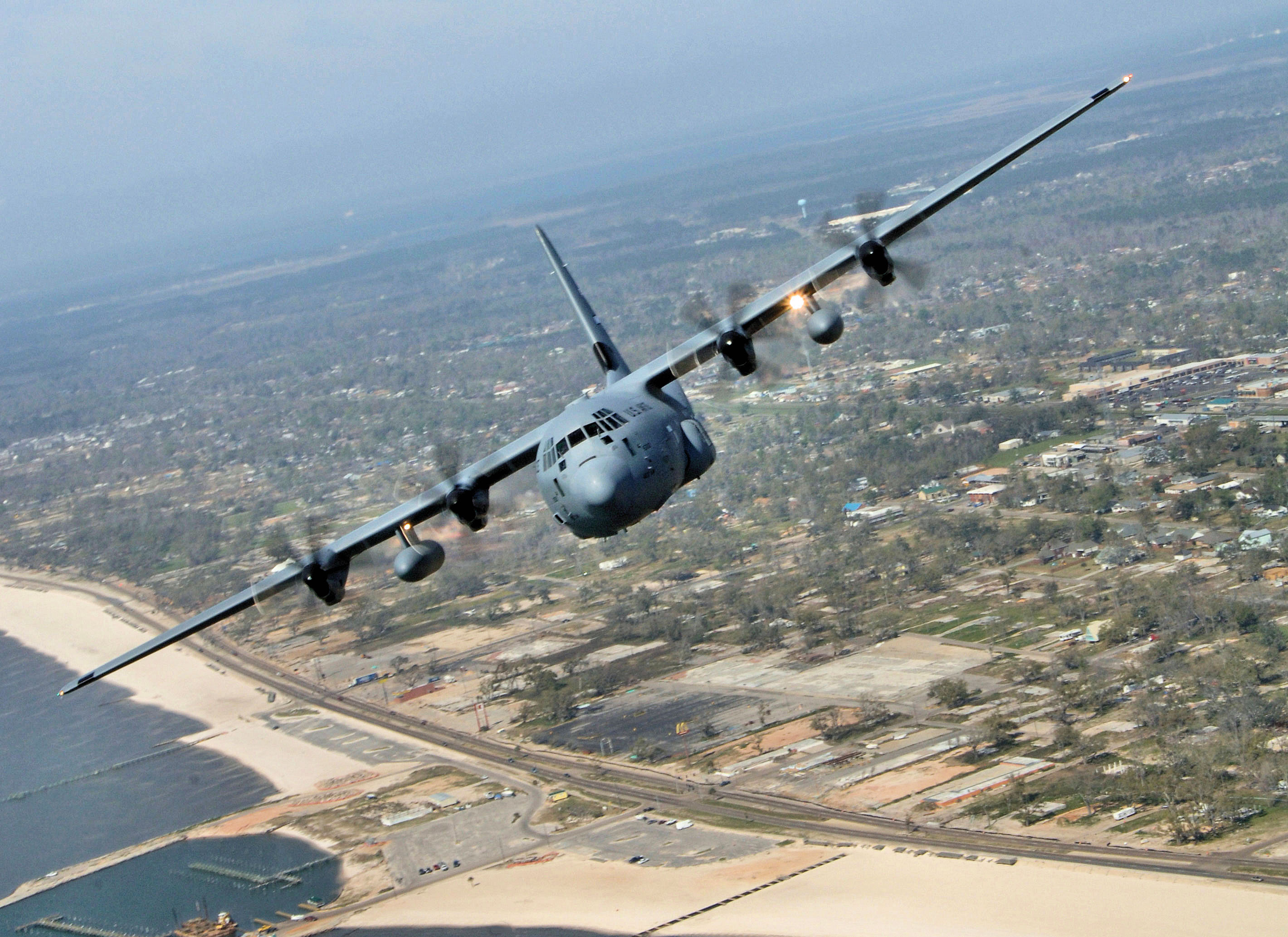
- 403rd Wing C-130 Hercules over coastal Georgia
- Active: 1949–1953; 1953–present
- Country: United States
- Branch: United States Air Force
- Role: Airlift & Weather Reconnaissance
- Part of: Air Force Reserve Command: Twenty-Second Air Force
- Garrison/HQ: Keesler Air Force Base
- Motto: Spectate ad Caelum Latin Look to the Skies
- Engagements: Korean War
- Decorations: Air Force Outstanding Unit Award; Republic of Korea Presidential Unit Citation; Republic of Vietnam Gallantry Cross with Palm

Commanders
- Current commander: Colonel Jaret T. Fish

Insignia
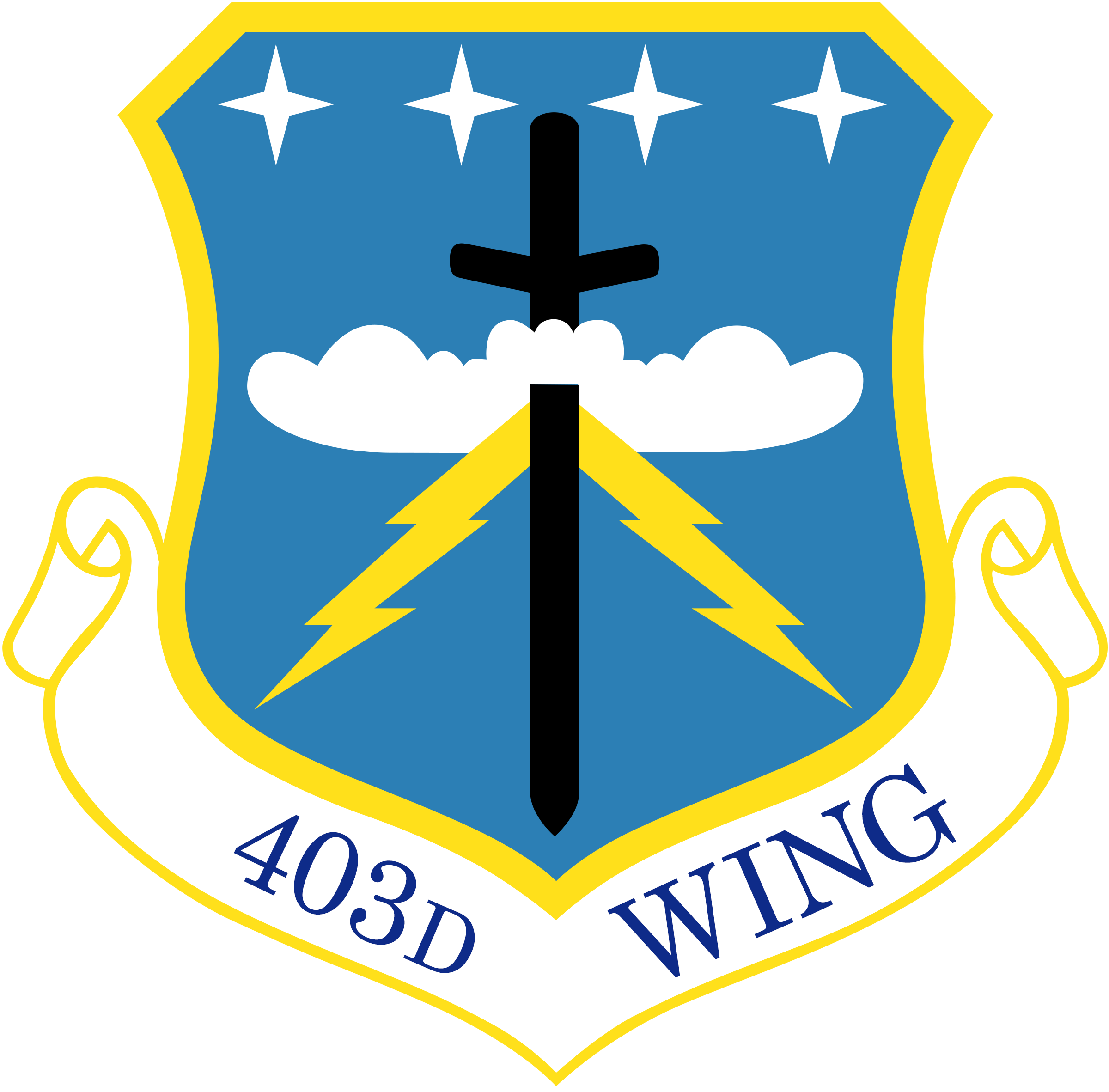
- 403rd Wing emblem (approved 19 December 1995)

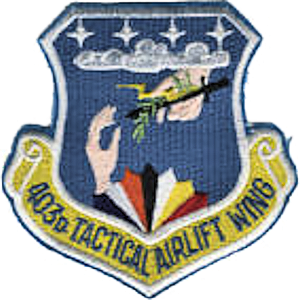
- 403rd Troop Carrier Wing emblem (approved 9 January 1953)

The 403rd Wing is a unit of the United States Air Force assigned to the Air Force Reserve Command. It is located at Keesler Air Force Base, Mississippi and employs a military manning authorization of more than 1,400 reservists, including some 250 full-time air reserve technicians. The 403rd Wing is a subordinate unit of the 22nd Air Force at Dobbins Air Reserve Base.

== Mission ==
The 403rd Wing provides command and staff supervision to assigned squadrons and flights that support tactical airlift missions. These missions include airlift of personnel, equipment and supplies. Additionally, the wing is the only unit in the Department of Defense tasked to organize, equip, train and perform all hurricane weather reconnaissance in support of the Department of Commerce.

The 403rd is gained upon mobilization by the Air Mobility Command and will execute missions in support of the theater commander, such as resupply, employment operations within the combat zone or forward area, and when required, aeromedical, refugee evacuation and augmentation of other airlift forces.

As of 2021 the 403rd's mission is to Develop Exceptional Airmen Ready to Respond to Every Challenge, Every Time.

The Wing's vision is Wing of Choice...Airmen First Mission Always.

=== Units ===
The 403rd Wing has three subordinate groups, 12 squadrons, and three flights.

- 403rd Operations Group
  - 403rd Operations Support Squadron
  - 815th Airlift Squadron
  - 53rd Weather Reconnaissance Squadron
  - 36th Aeromedical Evacuation Squadron
  - 5th Operational Weather Flight
  - 12th Operational Weather Flight
- 403rd Maintenance Group
  - 403rd Maintenance Squadron
  - 403rd Aircraft Maintenance Squadron
  - 803rd Aircraft Maintenance Squadron
- 403rd Mission Support Group
  - 403rd Force Support Squadron
  - 403rd Security Forces Squadron
  - 403rd Logistics Readiness Squadron
  - 41st Aerial Port Squadron
  - 403rd Communications Flight
- 403rd Aeromedical Staging Squadron

== History ==
=== Initial activation ===
Established on 7 December 1942 and activated on 12 December 1942, the 403rd Troop Carrier Group mobilized in Bowman Field, Kentucky, as a response to U.S. involvement in World War II. The unit quickly moved to Alliance, Nebraska, for further training. Airmen of the 403rd Troop Carrier Group called themselves “The Sandmen,” after their beloved commander Colonel Harry Sands Jr., whom they called “The Old Man,” “The Colonel,” and “Colonel Bud.” They all agreed that Colonel Sands was a “great leader” and a “Good Joe,” and they followed his leadership into battle after only a few months of training in the heartland.

The 403rd Troop Carrier Group first entered the Pacific Theater of Operations on 27 July 1943, and was assigned to the XIII Air Force Service Command. The group became the first U.S. troop carrier unit to enter the South Pacific, the first and only troop carrier unit to enter both the South and Southwest Pacific Areas, and Airmen conducted the first parachute drop and first air evacuation in the South Pacific. Airmen at first were sent to Tontouta, New Caledonia, where the group provided immediate support of cargo and passengers to Espiritu Santo in the New Hebrides Islands and Guadalcanal. 403rd Airmen also provided paratrooper drop support of U.S. and Australian paratroopers during the Lae Campaign in New Guinea in September 1943. 403rd Airmen were also involved in the February 1944 invasion of the Philippines to liberate the islands from Japanese control. Flying C-47s, Airmen brought in cargo and high priority personnel into the archipelago and evacuated wounded personnel on their way back. Airmen continued to work throughout 1944 to move troops, supplies, and other cargo to advance bases in the Pacific. Over the course of two years of flying during the war, the Group flew 247,660 hours and completed 201,422 missions. Airmen flew approximately 43, 211, 326 mission miles, and Airmen earned 546 Distinguished Flying Cross Medals, 1 Soldier's Medal, and 1 Legion of Merit.

After the war, the 403rd was inactivated on 15 October 1946 and placed on an interim status for more than two years. The unit was redesignated as the 403rd Troop Carrier Group Medium on 10 May 1949 while the 403rd Troop Carrier Wing was activated on 27 June 1949 at Portland Airport in Portland, Oregon. The activation marked a major change in the unit's organization, as most Airmen in the 403rd came from the 305th Bombardment Group and not the wartime 403rd Troop Carrier Group. Prior to the activation, the 305th Bombardment Group had been activated in July 1947 under command of Colonel Chester McCarty, but due to inadequate facilities at the Portland Airport, the Group “did very little work.”

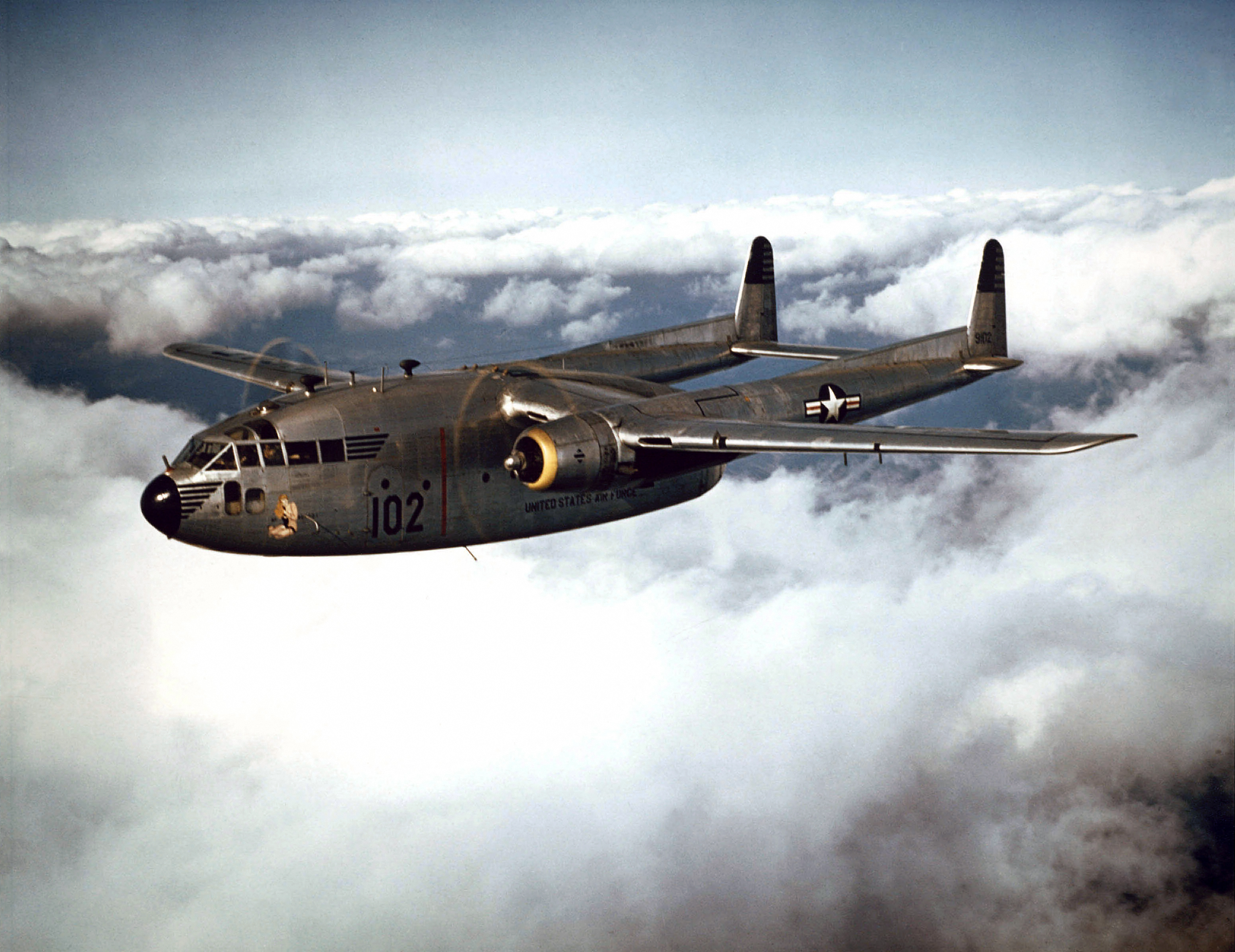
Wing C-119 in 1952 (Note: Aircraft is Fairchild C-119B-10-FA Flying Boxcar serial 49-102 of the 314th Troop Carrier Group. This aircraft was later converted to a C-119C.)

The wing was first activated at Portland Airport in June 1949 as the 403rd Troop Carrier Wing, a Curtiss C-46 Commando unit when Continental Air Command reorganized its reserve units under the wing base organization system. At Portland, the wing trained under the supervision of the 2343d Air Force Reserve Flying Training Center. The wing was manned at 25% of normal strength but its 403rd Troop Carrier Group was authorized four squadrons rather than the three of active duty units.

The wing was mobilized on 1 April 1951 for duty during the Korean War. The 403rd was one of six reserve troop carrier wings mobilized for service with Tactical Air Command (TAC). The reserve wings were assigned to Eighteenth Air Force, which was initially composed entirely of reserve troop carrier units., The wing trained at home in its C-46s and participated in Eighteenth Air Force's training exercises until March 1952, when TAC directed it to transfer its C-46s and prepare to move its personnel overseas. The wing departed the United States on 29 March and by 14 April, it was in place at Ashiya Air Base, Japan.

Upon arrival at Ashiya, the 314th Troop Carrier Group, flying Fairchild C-119 Flying Boxcars, and the 21st Troop Carrier Squadron, flying Douglas C-47 Skytrains and Douglas C-54 Skymasters were attached to the wing for operations, bringing wing strength to nine squadrons. The wing's 403rd Troop Carrier Group spent its first month at Ashiya training on its new C-119s.

This action finally solved the Far East Air Force's year-old problem of providing the Army with sufficient lift to handle the 187th Regimental Combat Team intact. The new arrangement was soon put to the test. In May 1952, the 403rd airlifted the 187th to Pusan in an expedited movement incident to quelling a communist prisoner of war riot at Koje Do Island. It engaged in a number of airborne training missions with the 187th. In October 1952 the wing participated in an airborne feint which was part of a United Nations Command amphibious demonstration off eastern Korea

While on active service, the wing airdropped more than 10,000 personnel, airlifted over 18,000 tons and evacuated almost 14,000 patients. After twenty-one months of active service, the 403rd Troop Carrier Wing was inactivated on 1 January 1953 and its mission, personnel and equipment were transferred to the 483d Troop Carrier Wing, which was simultaneously activated.

=== Reactivation in the reserve ===
The wing was activated the same day back in Portland, where it replaced the 454th Troop Carrier Wing, which had been activated in the summer of 1952 when the reserves began receiving aircraft again following its mobilization for the Korean War. (Note: All reserve combat and corollary units were mobilized for the Korean war. Cantwell, p. 87. The reserve mobilization for the Korean war, however, left the reserve without aircraft, and reserve units did not receive aircraft until July 1952. Cantwell, p. 139) The 403rd performed routine airlift training the reserve. During that time, the wing also supported Army airdrop training, ferried aircraft to various parts of the country and the world, took part in training exercises, and performed humanitarian missions as needed.

During the first half of 1955, the Air Force began detaching Air Force Reserve squadrons from their parent wing locations to separate sites. The concept offered several advantages: communities were more likely to accept the smaller squadrons than the large wings and the location of separate squadrons in smaller population centers would facilitate recruiting and manning. As it finally evolved in the spring of 1955, Continental Air Command (ConAC)'s plan called for placing Air Force reserve units at fifty-nine installations located throughout the United States. In one of the first three moves to implement this program, ConAC detached the 65th Troop Carrier Squadron from Portland to Paine Air Force Base, Washington. In time, the detached squadron program proved successful in attracting additional participants

=== Move to Selfridge Air Force Base ===
The Joint Chiefs of Staff were pressuring the Air Force to provide more wartime airlift. At the same time, about 150 C-119s became available from the active force. Consequently, in November 1956 the Air Force directed ConAC to convert three fighter bomber wings to the troop carrier mission by September 1957. In addition, within the Air Staff was a recommendation that the reserve fighter mission given to the Air National Guard and replaced by the troop carrier mission. Cuts in the budget in 1957 also led to a reduction in the number of reserve wings from 24 to 15 and of squadrons from 55 to 45. The reduction impacted the 403rd Wing, which was replaced at Portland by a single squadron, the 304th Air Rescue Squadron. The wing was not inactivated, however. Instead, it moved as a paper unit to Selfridge Air Force Base, Michigan, where it replaced one of the inactivating reserve fighter units, the 439th Fighter-Bomber Wing. The 63d Troop Carrier Squadron was located at Selfridge with wing headquarters, but the 64th Troop Carrier Squadron was at Niagara Falls Municipal Airport, where it absorbed the resources of the 445th Troop Carrier Wing, (Note: The 445th Wing, which had been a Fighter-Bomber unit itself, was not inactivated, but moved to another station to replace an inactivating fighter bomber unit. Ravenstein, pp. 241–242) while the 65th replaced the 713th Fighter-Bomber Squadron at Davis Field, Oklahoma. The 64th Squadron's stay in New York was short, for in March 1958 it moved to O'Hare International Airport, Illinois, where it replaced the 97th Troop Carrier Squadron, placing it closer to wing headquarters.

After the success of reserve wings in providing airlift in Operation Sixteen Ton, (Note: The 403rd Wing was the only reserve airlift wing that did not participate in this operation. Cantwell, pp. 149–150.) the wing began to use inactive duty training periods for Operation Swift Lift, transporting high priority cargo for the air force and Operation Ready Swap, transporting aircraft engines, between Air Materiel Command's depots.

The wing trained with the 2242d Air Reserve Flying Center, but in April 1958, the center was inactivated and some of its personnel were absorbed by the wing. In place of active duty support for reserve units, ConAC adopted the Air Reserve Technician Program, in which a cadre of the unit consisted of full-time personnel who were simultaneously civilian employees of the Air Force and held rank as members of the reserves. One year later, ConAC organized its wings under the Dual Deputate organization. (Note: Under this plan flying squadrons reported to the wing Deputy Commander for Operations and maintenance squadrons reported to the wing Deputy Commander for Maintenance) The 403rd Troop Carrier Group was inactivated and all flying squadrons were directly assigned to the wing.

=== Activation of groups under the wing ===
Although the dispersal of flying units was not a problem when the entire wing was called to active service, mobilizing a single flying squadron and elements to support it proved difficult. This weakness was demonstrated in the partial mobilization of reserve units during the Berlin Crisis of 1961 To resolve this, at the start of 1962, ConAC determined to reorganize its reserve wings by establishing groups with support elements for each of its troop carrier squadrons. This reorganization would facilitate mobilization of elements of wings in various combinations when needed. However, as this plan was entering its implementation phase, another partial mobilization, which included the 403rd Wing, occurred for the Cuban Missile Crisis, with the units being released on 22 November 1962 after a month of active service. The 403rd was one of eight troop carrier wings activated for the crisis. The formation of troop carrier groups was delayed until February 1963 for wings that had been mobilized. The 927th Troop Carrier Group at Selfridge, the 928th Troop Carrier Group at O'Hare and the 929th Troop Carrier Group at Davis Field, were all assigned to the wing on 11 February.

In 1963, the wing moved US troops to the Dominican Republic and airlifted Christmas gifts destined for US servicemen in Vietnam. In January 1963 the wing also headed a mission to provide support for the Cuyamel Mission Clinic in Cuyamel, Honduras, and airlifted eight tons of medical supplies to the clinic.

=== Composite wing ===
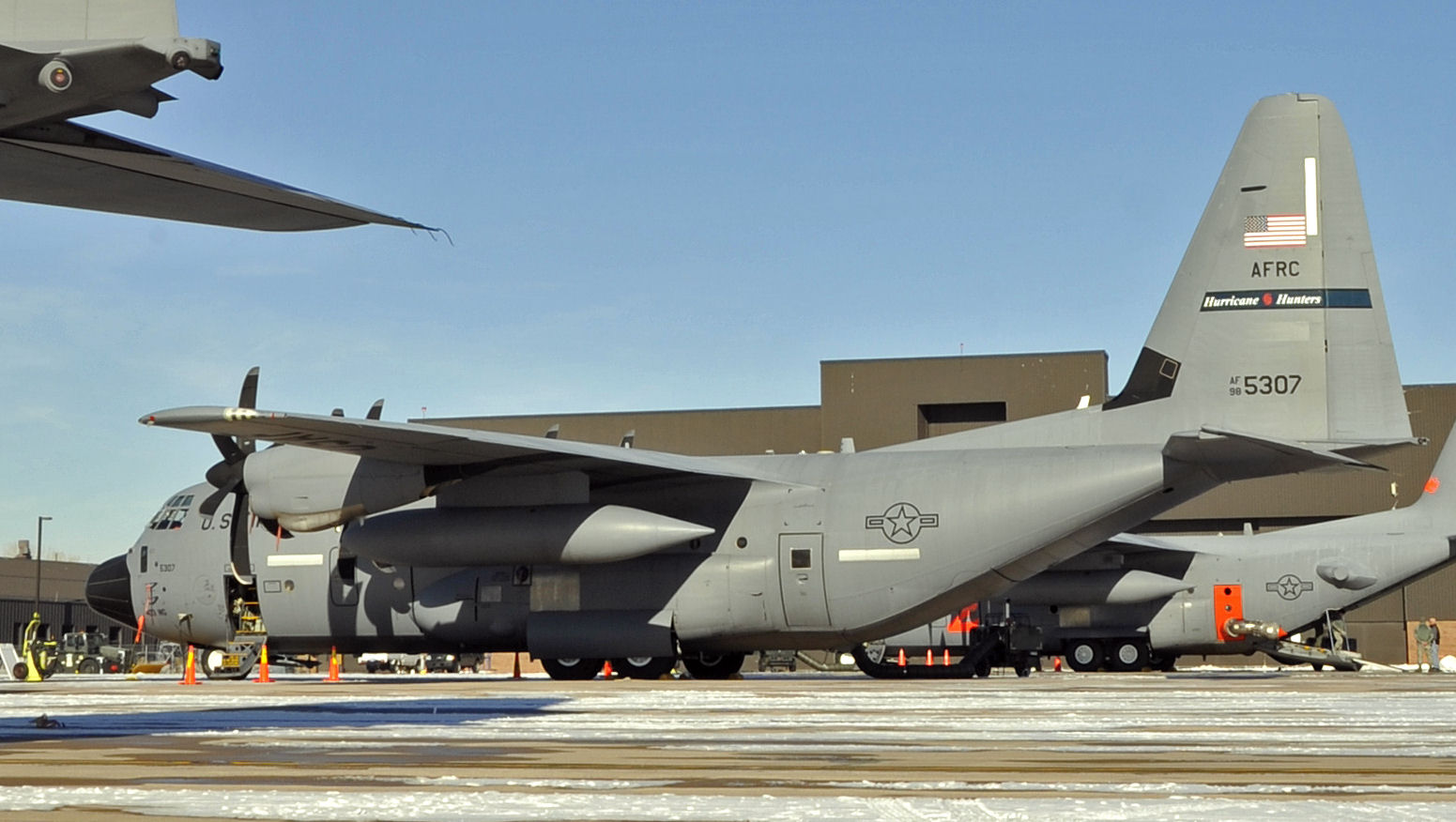
403rd WG Lockheed Martin WC-130J Hercules 98-5307

After a period of uncertainty from 1969 to 1971, when it served as a composite wing with a variety of missions and aircraft, the 403rd returned to tactical airlift missions. From 1971 to 1976, the wing took part in several tactical exercises and humanitarian airlift operations. During that time it also ferried aircraft, supplies, and equipment to US forces in Vietnam and other points in the Far East. In 1976 and 1977, the wing was re-designated as the 403rd Aerospace Rescue and Recovery Wing and gained the 301st, 303d, 304th, and 305th Aerospace Rescue and Recovery Squadrons (ARRS). Although the 403rd Wing added four Aerospace Rescue and Recovery Squadrons, only the 305th ARRS operated at Selfridge Air Force Base. The 301st AARS conducted rescue missions out of Homestead Air Force Base in Florida, while the 303d AARS did the same in March Field, California, and the 304th in Portland, Oregon. Airmen performed search and rescue, and aeromedical evacuation missions. In 1977 the 920th Weather Reconnaissance Group was also assigned to the 403rd as was the 815th Weather Reconnaissance Squadron. Its crews and aircraft conducted aerial weather reconnaissance missions and flew into hurricanes to determine their intensities and movements. In 1978, after a mass suicide at Jonestown in Guyana, the wing helped recover the bodies of US citizens. After the eruption of Mount St. Helens (Washington) in 1980, the wing participated in search and rescue efforts.

=== Operations at Keesler Air Force Base ===
Its most memorable accomplishments, however, have been while flying reserve-status humanitarian airlift missions such as those flown during Operation Provide Relief, rescue missions supporting the space shuttle program, providing airlift support to United States Southern Command and U.S. embassies within Central and South America, and participating in real-world war contingencies such as Operation Just Cause, the 1989 action to replace Manuel Noriega as ruler of Panama; Operations Desert Shield and Desert Storm in Southwest Asia; Operation Provide Promise, the airlift of humanitarian aid to Bosnia and Herzegovina; Operation Provide Comfort, aiding Kurds fleeing Iraqi oppression; Operation Uphold Democracy, the removal of a junta in Haiti; and Operation Provide Relief, the delivery of humanitarian aid during the Somali Civil War. Since 1993, the 403rd has also gained the 53d Weather Reconnaissance Squadron which was re-activated and replaced the 815th Weather Reconnaissance Squadron. Airmen in the 53d, also known as Hurricane Hunters, are part of the only operational unit in the world that conducts aerial weather reconnaissance on a routine basis.

Following the September 11, 2001, terror attacks, Airmen in the 403rd deployed numerous times in support of the Global War on Terror. In addition to Operation Joint Forge in Bosnia-Herzegovina, Airmen in the wing deployed to Iraq, Afghanistan, and other countries in the Middle East and Southwest Asia in support of Operations Iraqi Freedom and Enduring Freedom. In May 2006, Airmen in the 96th Aerial Port Squadron deployed to Ali Al Salem Air Base in Kuwait in support of Operations Iraqi Freedom and Enduring Freedom, while in one 2009 deployment, Airmen in the 815th Airlift Squadron set a world record for the maximum number of airdrop bundles delivered in a one-week period including 801 bundles in 24 missions. Airmen also flew 358 missions and 1,233 sorties and delivered nearly 5,000 tons of cargo. Aircrews also flew over 20,000 passengers including more than 500 aeromedical evacuation patients, and logged more than 2,500 flying hours.

Airmen in the 403rd continued to routinely deploy during the second decade of the twenty-first century with deployments to Afghanistan and various other locations in Southwest Asia in September 2012, September 2013, November 2013, and 2015 in support of Operations Enduring Freedom, Freedom's Sentinel and Inherent Resolve. During one deployment in May 2018, 403rd Airmen deployed to Al Udeid Air Base, Qatar, participated in the first dual-mission combat airdrop with Airmen assigned to the 774th Expeditionary Airlift Squadron at Bagram Airfield, Afghanistan.

On 6 August 2010 the wing received operational control of the regular 345th Airlift Squadron "The Golden Eagles," the first C-130 active associate squadron in Air Mobility Command, and began integrating its personnel with the operations of the reserve 815th Airlift Squadron. However, on 21 March 2013, the wing announced that beginning in October 2013 it would be redeploying its 10 C-130J aircraft to Pope Air Force Base, North Carolina, in preparation for inactivation of the 815th under the Force Structure Action Implementation Plan. The associate active 345th was inactivated, while the 53d Weather Reconnaissance Squadron was unaffected. The transfer of the aircraft was delayed in early 2014 and the closure of the two airlift squadrons delayed on 28 July 2014 pending final plans in National Defense Authorization Act 2015 to shut down the 440th Airlift Wing at Pope.

In April 2014 the 815th Airlift Squadron was scheduled for inactivation, but the order was amended in July later that year. Following the decision to keep the 815th Airlift Squadron, another maintenance squadron was activated to provide adequate aircraft maintenance. On 11 September 2016, the 803d Aircraft Maintenance Squadron was activated. The 36th Aeromedical Evacuation Squadron transferred from Pope Field, North Carolina in February 2016, while the 12th Operational Weather flight was also reassigned to the 403rd in October 2017.

== Lineage ==
- Established as the 403rd Troop Carrier Wing, Medium on 10 May 1949

Activated in the reserve on 27 June 1949
Ordered to active duty on 1 April 1951
Inactivated on 1 January 1953

- Activated in the reserve on 1 January 1953

Ordered to active duty on 28 October 1962
Relieved from active duty on 28 November 1962
Redesignated 403rd Tactical Airlift Wing on 1 July 1967
Redesignated 403rd Composite Wing on 31 December 1969
Redesignated 403rd Tactical Airlift Wing on 29 July 1971
Redesignated 403rd Aerospace Rescue and Recovery Wing on 15 March 1976
Redesignated 403rd Rescue and Weather Reconnaissance Wing on 1 January 1977
Redesignated 403rd Tactical Airlift Wingon 31 December 1987
Redesignated 403rd Airlift Wing on 1 February 1992
Redesignated 403rd Wing on 1 July 1994

=== Assignments ===
- Fourth Air Force, 27 June 1949
- Tactical Air Command, 2 April 1951
- Eighteenth Air Force, 1 June 1951 – 1 January 1953 (attached to 315th Air Division after 14 April 1952)
- Fourth Air Force, 1 January 1953
- Tenth Air Force, 16 November 1957
- Fifth Air Force Reserve Region, 1 September 1960
- Twelfth Air Force, 28 October 1962
- Fifth Air Force Reserve Region, 28 November 1962
- Central Air Force Reserve Region, 31 December 1969
- Eastern Air Force Reserve Region, 1 April 1971
- Western Air Force Reserve Region, 15 March 1976
- Fourth Air Force, 8 October 1976
- Fourteenth Air Force, 1 August 1992
- Twenty-Second Air Force, 1 July 1993
- Tenth Air Force, 1 October 1994
- Twenty-Second Air Force, 1 April 1997 – present

=== Components ===
Groups

- 314th Troop Carrier Group: attached 14 April – 31 December 1952
- 403rd Troop Carrier Group (later 403rd Operations Group): 27 June 1949 – 1 January 1953; 1 January 1953 – 14 April 1959; 1 August 1992
- 908th Airlift Group: 1 August 1992 – 1 October 1994
- 913th Tactical Airlift Group (later 913th Airlift Group): 21 April 1971 – 8 January 1976; 1 August 1992 – 1 October 1994
- 914th Tactical Airlift Group: 21 April 1971 – 8 January 1976
- 920th Weather Reconnaissance Group: 1 January 1977 – 1 July 1981; 1 March 1983 – 1 November 1983
- 927th Troop Carrier Group (later 927th Tactical Airlift Group, 927th Tactical Air Support Group, 927th Tactical Airlift Group): 11 February 1963 – 31 December 1969; 1 June 1970 – 15 March 1976
- 928th Troop Carrier Group (later 1928th Tactical Airlift Group, 928th Tactical Air Support Group, 928th Tactical Airlift Group): 11 February 1963 – 1 December 1969
- 929th Troop Carrier Group: 11 February 1963 – 1 January 1964
- 930th Special Operations Group: 1 June 1970 – 15 January 1971
- 931st Tactical Air Support Group: 1 June 1970 – 15 January 1971
- 934th Tactical Airlift Group: 31 December 1987 – 1 August 1992
- 939th Aerospace Rescue and Recovery Group: 1 April 1985 – 1 October 1987

Squadrons

- 21st Troop Carrier Squadron: attached 14 April – 1 December 1952
- 53rd Troop Carrier Squadron: attached 14 April – c. 12 September 1952
- 63rd Troop Carrier Squadron: 14 April 1959 – 11 February 1963
- 64th Troop Carrier Squadron: 14 April 1959 – 11 February 1963
- 65th Troop Carrier Squadron: 14 April 1959 – 11 January 1963
- 301st Aerospace Rescue and Recovery Squadron: 15 March 1976 – 1 October 1987
- 303rd Aerospace Rescue and Recovery Squadron: 15 March 1976 – 1 April 1985
- 304th Aerospace Rescue and Recovery Squadron: 15 March 1976 – 8 April 1985
- 305th Aerospace Rescue and Recovery Squadron: 15 March 1976 – 1 October 1987
- 815th Weather Reconnaissance Squadron (later 815th Tactical Airlift Squadron, 815th Airlift Squadron): 1 November 1983 – 1 August 1992
- 6461st Troop Carrier Squadron: attached 1 – 31 December 1952

=== Stations ===
- Portland Airport (later Portland International Airport), Oregon, 27 June 1949 – 29 March 1952
- Ashiya Air Base, Japan, 14 April 1952 – 1 January 1953
- Portland International Airport, Oregon, 1 January 1953
- Selfridge Air Force Base (later Selfridge Air National Guard Base), Michigan, 16 November 1957
- Keesler Air Force Base, Mississippi, 1 November 1983 – present

=== Aircraft ===
- Beechcraft T-7 Navigator (1949–1951)
- Beechcraft T-11 Kansan (1949–1951)
- Curtiss C-46 Commando (1949–1952, 1953–1957)
- Curtiss TC-46 Commando (1949, 1952)
- Douglas C-47 Skytrain (1952, 1957 – Unknown)
- Douglas C-54 Skymaster (1952)
- Fairchild C-119 Flying Boxcar (1952, 1957–1969, 1970)
- Cessna U-3 Blue Canoe (1969, 1970–1971)
- Cessna O-2 Skymaster (1970–1971)
- Cessna A-37 Dragonfly (1970–1971)
- Lockheed C-130 Hercules (1971–1976, 1977, 1987, 1983–1998)
- Bell HH-1 Huey (1976–1987)
- Sikorsky HH-3 Jolly Green Giant (1976–1987)
- Sikorsky CH-3 Jolly Green Giant (1976–1977)
- Bell UH-1 Huey (1979–1987)
- Lockheed HC-130 Hercules (1976–1987)
- Lockheed C-130J Super Hercules (1998 – present)
- Lockheed WC-130A/B/E/H Hercules, (1965–2005)
- Lockheed WC-130J Super Hercules, (1998–present)

=== Commanders ===
- Brig Gen Chester E. McCarty, 27 Jun 1949
- Col Sidney S. Murphy, c. Jul 1951
- Brig Gen Chester E. McCarty, Aug 1951
- Lt Col Robert E. Harrington, 6 Dec 1951
- Brig Gen Chester E. McCarty, 8 Feb 1952
- Col Philip H. Best, 14 Apr 1952
- Col Maurice F. Casey Jr., 15 May 1952 1 Jan 1953.
- Unknown, 1 Jan 1953
- Col Robert W. Sheets, by Jan 1954
- Col James H. McPartlin, 15 Nov 1957
- Col Gari F. King, 1 Aug 1961
- Col George L. Kittle, 1 Dec 1970
- Brig Gen George H. Wilson, 22 Mar 1971
- Brig Gen Roy M. Marshall, 25 Jun 1973
- Col James S. Brown, 22 Jul 1976
- Lt Col Elmer C. Apel, 17 Aug 1976
- Col James C. Wahleithner, 18 Jan 1977
- Brig Gen Richard L. Hall, 9 Apr 1979
- Brig Gen Joe L. Campbell, 24 May 1989
- Brig Gen Ernest R. Webster, 2 Mar 1994
- Brig Gen Charles D. Ethredge, 2 Apr 2000
- Brig Gen Richard R. Moss, Jul 2004-11 Jan 2009
- Brig Gen James Muscatell, 11 Jan 2009-12 May 2011
- Col Jay D. Jensen, 12 May 2011-15 Jul 2013
- Col Craig L. LaFave, 16 Jul 2013-13 Sep 2013
- Col Frank Amodeo, 14 Sep 2013-31 Aug 2016
- Col Michael W. Manion, 31 Aug 2016-7 May 2017
- Col Jennie r. Johnson, 7 May 2017-09 Jun 2019
- Col Robert J. Stanton, 01 Mar 2018-temporary
- Col Jeffrey A. Van Dootingh, 09 Jun 2019-05 Jun 2021
- Col Stuart M. Rubio, 05 Jun 2021-11 July 2025
- Col. Jaret T. Fish, 11 July 2025 – Present

== See also ==
- Thirteenth Air Force
- United States Air Force in South Korea
