= 63rd Air Refueling Squadron =

US Air Force unit

63rd Air Refueling Squadron

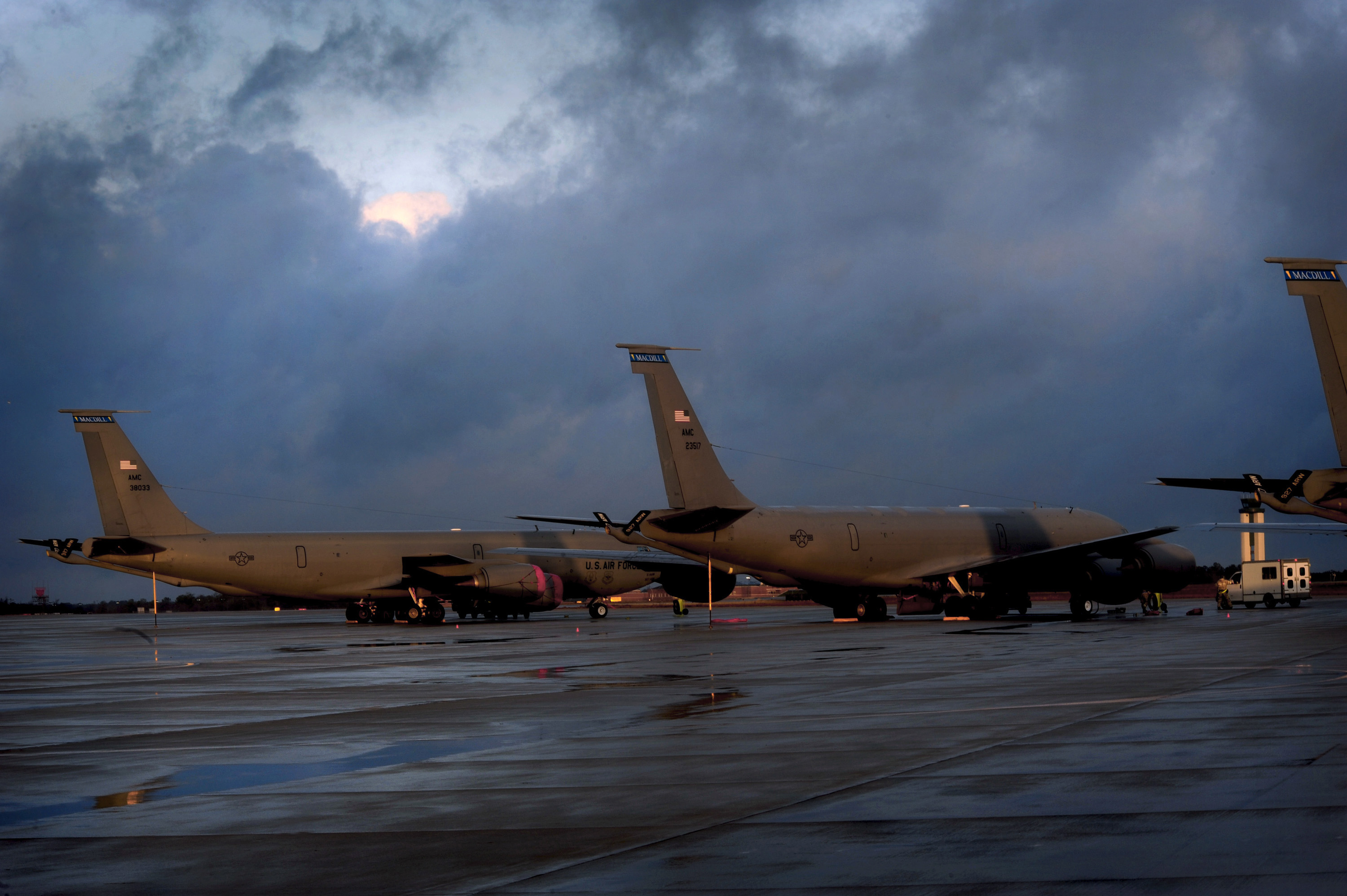
- 927th Air Refueling Wing KC-135 Stratotankers
- Active: 1942–1946; 1947–1953; 1953–present
- Country: United States
- Branch: United States Air Force
- Role: Aerial refueling
- Part of: Air Force Reserve Command
- Garrison/HQ: MacDill Air Force Base
- Nickname(s): Flying Jennies
- Engagements: Southwest Pacific Theater; Korean War
- Decorations: Distinguished Unit Citation; Navy Meritorious Unit Commendation; Air Force Outstanding Unit Award; Philippine Presidential Unit Citation; Republic of Korea Presidential Unit Citation; Republic of Vietnam Gallantry Cross with Palm

Insignia
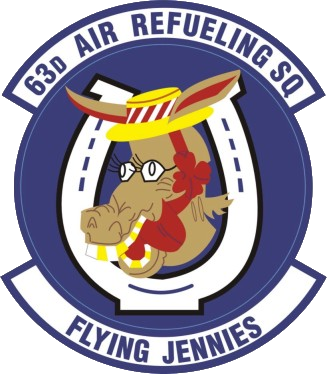
- 63rd Air Refueling Squadron emblem (Note: Approved 20 October 1952.)

The 63rd Air Refueling Squadron, sometimes written as 63d Air Refueling Squadron, is a United States Air Force Reserve squadron, assigned to the 927th Operations Group at MacDill Air Force Base, Florida. It is a reserve associate of the active duty 91st Air Refueling Squadron. The squadron operates the KC-135 Stratotanker aircraft conducting air refueling missions.

The squadron was activated during World War II as the 63d Troop Carrier Squadron. After Training in the United States, it deployed to the Southwest Pacific Theater, where it flew airlift missions, earning a Distinguished Unit Citation, Navy Meritorious Unit Commendation, and Philippine Presidential Unit Citation for its actions. After V-J Day, the squadron remained in the Philippines until inactivating in May 1946.

The squadron was again activated in the reserve in 1947. In April 1951, the squadron was called to active duty for the Korean War. It moved to Japan, and again flew combat airlift missions, earning a Republic of Korea Presidential Unit Citation. In January 1953, the squadron was relieved from active duty, transferring its planes and personnel to a regular unit. It was activated the same day in the reserve. The squadron continued to fly airlift missions, and was again called to active service for the Cuban Missile Crisis in 1962. Except for a short period, when it was nominally a special operations unit, it flew airlift missions until 1992, when it converted to the air refueling role.

== History ==
=== World War II ===
The 63d flew aerial transportation and casualty evacuation in the South and Southwest Pacific from, 6 August 1943-c.August 1945, and between Japan and Korea from 19 May-31 December 1952. The squadron received a Navy Unit Commendation for its service at part of the South Pacific Combat Air Transport Command (SCAT) from October 1943 to July 1944.

=== Air reserve operations ===
The squadron conducted tactical airlift operations from 1953 to 1969 and 1971 to 1992 and trained for tactical air support missions from 1969 to 1971. It deployed personnel to Southwest Asia in 1990 and 1991 during Operations Desert Shield and Desert Storm. It has flown air refueling missions since 1992.

== Lineage ==
- Constituted as the 63rd Troop Carrier Squadron on 7 December 1942

Activated on 12 December 1942
Inactivated on 15 May 1946

- Activated in the reserve on 21 June 1947

Redesignated 63rd Troop Carrier Squadron, Medium, on 27 June 1949
Ordered to active service on 1 April 1951
Inactivated on 1 January 1953

- Activated in the reserve on 1 January 1953

Ordered to active service on 28 October 1962
Relieved from active service on 28 November 1962

- Redesignated 63d Tactical Airlift Squadron on 1 July 1967
- Redesignated 63d Tactical Air Support Squadron on 26 June 1969
- Redesignated 63d Tactical Airlift Squadron on 29 June 1971
- Redesignated 63d Airlift Squadron on 1 February 1992
- Redesignated 63d Air Refueling Squadron on 1 Oct 1992

=== Assignments ===
- 403d Troop Carrier Group, 12 December 1942 – 15 May 1946 (attached to South Pacific Combat Air Transport Command 10 October 1943 – 3 July 1944)
- 419th Troop Carrier Group, 21 June 1947
- 403d Troop Carrier Group, 27 June 1949 – 1 January 1953
- 403d Troop Carrier Group, 1 January 1953
- 403d Troop Carrier Wing, 14 April 1959
- 927th Troop Carrier Group (later 927th Tactical Air Support Group, 927th Tactical Airlift Group, 927th Airlift Group, 927th Air Refueling Group), 11 Feb 1963
- 927th Operations Group, 1 Aug 1992 – present

=== Stations ===
- Bowman Field, Kentucky, 12 December 1942
- Alliance Army Air Field, Nebraska, 18 December 1942
- Pope Field, North Carolina, 3 May 1943
- Baer Field, Indiana, 20 June – 18 July 1943
- Espiritu Santo, 6 August 1943
- Los Negros Island, 13 August 1944
- Biak, 1 October 1944 (air echelon operated from Wakde, 4–19 October 1944, and from Noemfoor, 29 October - 29 December 1944)
- Dulag Airfield, Leyte, 3 May 1945
- Clark Field, Luzon, 23 January – 15 May 1946
- Andrews Field (later Andrews Air Force Base), Maryland, 21 June 1947
- Portland Municipal Airport, Oregon, 27 June 1949 – 29 March 1952
- Ashiya Air Base, Japan, 14 April 1952 – 1 January 1953
- Portland International Airport, Oregon, 1 January 1953
- Selfridge Air Force Base (later Selfridge Air National Guard Base), Michigan, 16 November 1957
- MacDill Air Force Base, Florida, 1 May 2008 – present

=== Aircraft ===
- Douglas C-47 Skytrain (1943–1946)
- Curtiss C-46 Commando (1945–1946, 1951–1952, 1953–1957)
- Douglas C-54 Skymaster (1946)
- Fairchild C-119 Flying Boxcar (1952, 1953–1954, 1957–1969)
- Cessna U-3 Blue Canoe (1969–1971)
- Lockheed C-130 Hercules (1971–1992)
- Boeing KC-135 Stratotanker (1992 – present)
