= 929th Troop Carrier Group =

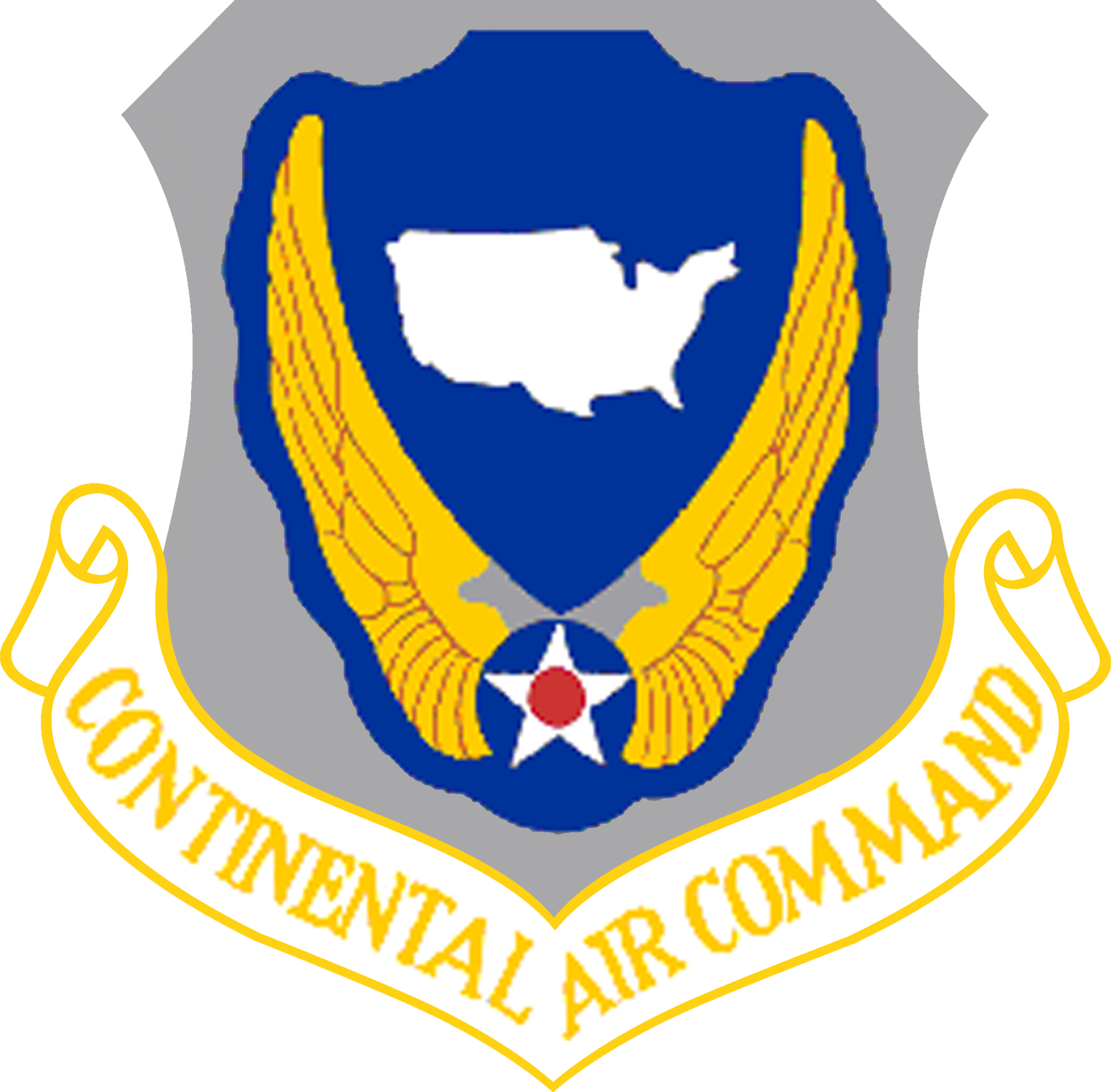
929th Troop Carrier Group

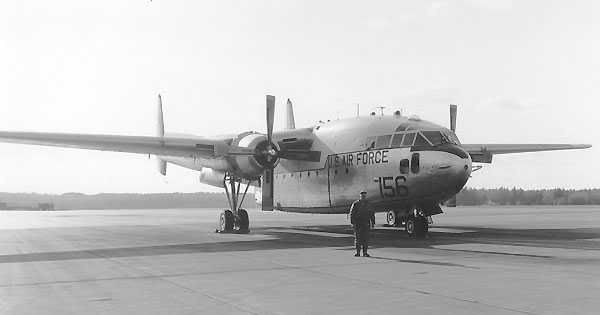
- Reserve C-119 Flying Boxcar (Note: Aircraft is Kaiser-Frazer C-119F-KM Flying Boxcar serial 51-8156)
- Active: 1963-1966
- Country: United States
- Branch: United States Air Force
- Role: Airlift
- Part of: Continental Air Command

The 929th Troop Carrier Group is an inactive United States Air Force Reserve unit. It was last active with the 433d Troop Carrier Wing, based at Davis Field, Oklahoma. It was inactivated on 1 July 1966

== History ==
=== Need for reserve troop carrier groups ===
During the first half of 1955, the Air Force began detaching Air Force Reserve squadrons from their parent wing locations to separate sites. The concept offered several advantages. Communities were more likely to accept the smaller squadrons than the large wings and the location of separate squadrons in smaller population centers would facilitate recruiting and manning. Continental Air Command (ConAC)'s plan called for placing Air Force Reserve units at fifty-nine installations located throughout the United States. When these relocations were completed in 1959, reserve wing headquarters and wing support elements would typically be on one base, along with one (or in some cases two) of the wing's flying squadrons, while the remaining flying squadrons were spread over thirty-five Air Force, Navy and civilian airfields under what was called the Detached Squadron Concept.

Although this dispersal was not a problem when the entire wing was called to active service, mobilizing a single flying squadron and elements to support it proved difficult. This weakness was demonstrated in the partial mobilization of reserve units during the Berlin Crisis of 1961 To resolve this, at the start of 1962, Continental Air Command, (ConAC) determined to reorganize its reserve wings by establishing groups with support elements for each of its troop carrier squadrons. This reorganization would facilitate mobilization of elements of wings in various combinations when needed. However, as this plan was entering its implementation phase, another partial mobilization occurred for the Cuban Missile Crisis, with the units being released on 22 November 1962. The formation of troop carrier groups occurred in January 1963 for units that had not been mobilized, but was delayed until February for those that had been.

=== Activation of 929th Troop Carrier Group ===
As a result, the 929th Troop Carrier Group was established at Davis Field, Oklahoma on 11 February 1963, as the headquarters for the 65th Troop Carrier Squadron, which had been stationed there since November 1957. Along with group headquarters, a Combat Support Squadron, Materiel Squadron and a Tactical Infirmary were organized to support the 65th.

The group mission was to organize, recruit and train Air Force Reserve personnel in the tactical airlift of airborne forces, their equipment and supplies and delivery of these forces and materials by airdrop, landing or cargo extraction systems. The group was equipped with Fairchild C-119 Flying Boxcars for Tactical Air Command airlift operations.

The group was one of three C-119 groups assigned to the 403d Troop Carrier Wing in 1963, the others being the 927th Troop Carrier Group, at Selfridge Air Force Base, Michigan and the 928th Troop Carrier Group at O'Hare International Airport, Illinois.

In 1963, it moved US troops to the Dominican Republic and airlifted Christmas gifts destined for US servicemen in Vietnam. Reassigned to the 433d Troop Carrier Wing at Kelly Air Force Base, Texas in 1964; the unit, however remained at Davis Field.

In November 1965, Defense Secretary Robert McNamara announced that the 929th Troop Carrier Group would be moved from Davis Field because the facility was inadequate for the Air Force’s newer transport jets. Instead of being moved, the unit was instead inactivated due to budget reductions caused by the cost of the Vietnam War. The closure which was completed the following June, affected 798 reservists, eight active-duty personnel and 181 civilians.

== Lineage ==
- Established as the 929th Troop Carrier Group, Medium and activated on 15 January 1963 (not organized)

Organized in the Reserve on 11 February 1963
Inactivated on 1 July 1966

- Redesignated 929th Military Airlift Group on 31 July 1985

=== Assignments ===
- Continental Air Command, 15 January 1963 (not organized)
- 403d Troop Carrier Wing, 11 February 1963
- 433d Troop Carrier Wing, 1 January 1964 – 1 July 1966

=== Components ===
- 65th Troop Carrier Squadron, 11 February 1963 – 1 July 1966

=== Stations ===
- Davis Field, Oklahoma, 11 February 1963 – 1 July 1966

=== Aircraft ===
- Fairchild C-119 Flying Boxcar, 1963-1966
