= 64th Air Refueling Squadron =

US Air Force unit

64th Air Refueling Squadron

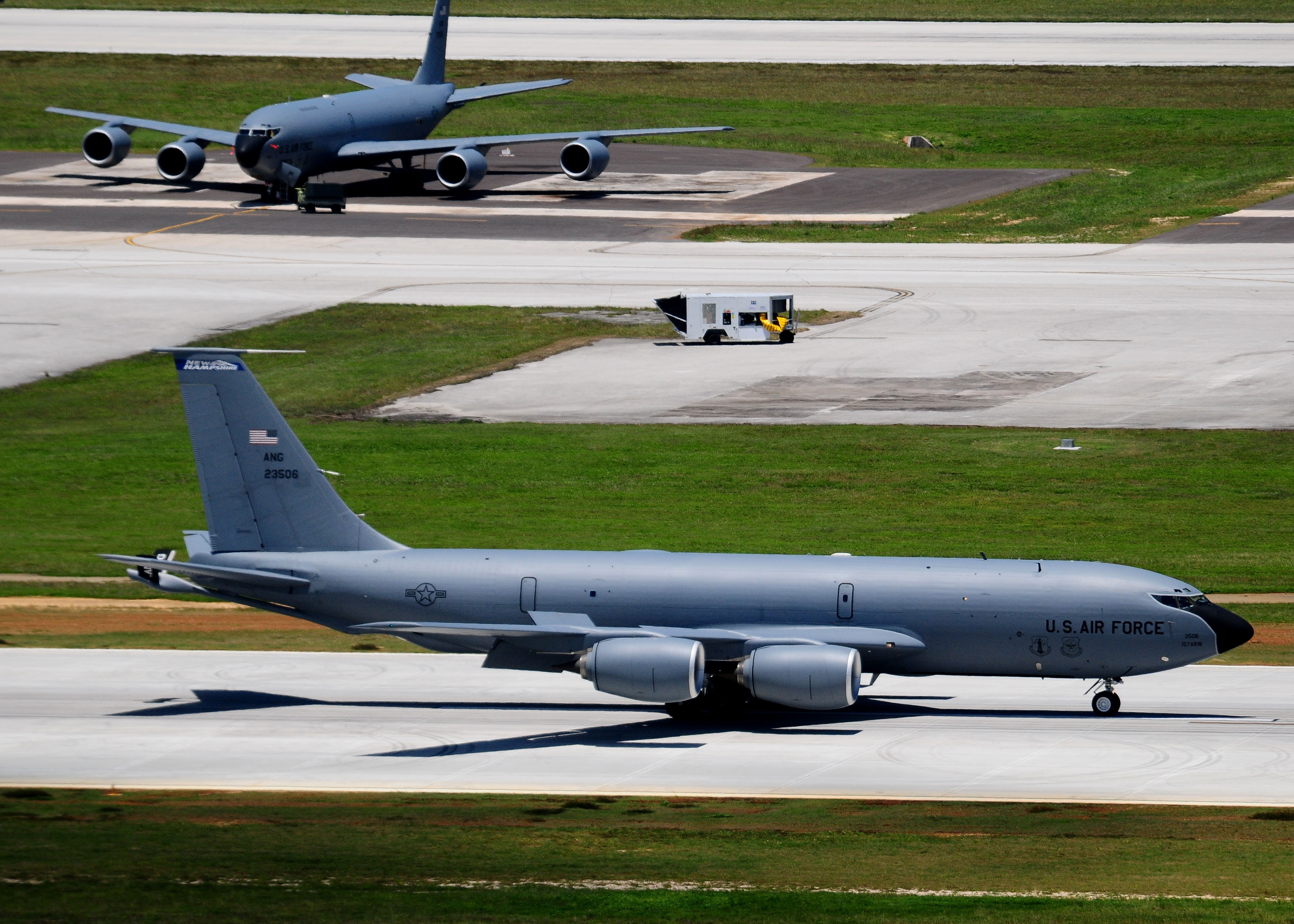
- 157th Air Refueling Wing KC-135R Stratotanker deployed to Andersen AFB
- Active: 1942–1946; 1947–1953; 1953–1997; 2003-2008; 2009–present
- Country: United States
- Branch: United States Air Force
- Role: Aerial refueling
- Part of: Air Mobility Command
- Engagements: World War II; Battle of New Georgia; Battle of Vella Lavella; Battle of Bougainville; Southwest Pacific Theater; Korean War; Vietnam War
- Decorations: Distinguished Unit Citation; Navy Unit Commendation; Air Force Outstanding Unit Award; Philippine Presidential Unit Citation; Republic of Korea Presidential Unit Citation; Republic of Vietnam Gallantry Cross with Palm

Commanders
- Current commander: Lt. Col Christopher Fei

Insignia
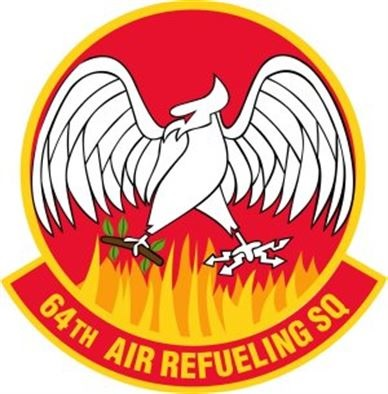
- 64th Air Refueling Squadron emblem (approved 28 June 1994)

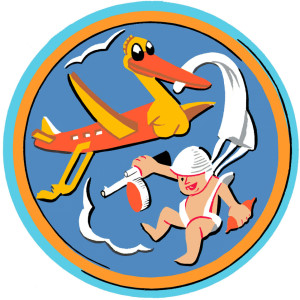
- 64th Troop Carrier Squadron emblem (approved 16 June 1943)

The 64th Air Refueling Squadron is a United States Air Force air-refueling squadron assigned to the 22d Operations Group at McConnell Air Force Base, Kansas. As part of the Air Force's Total Force Initiative, the 64th is stationed at Pease Air National Guard Base, New Hampshire, where it is operationally controlled by the 157th Air Refueling Wing of the New Hampshire Air National Guard. The 64th is equipped with the KC-46 Pegasus.

The 64th was first constituted during World War II, providing transportation and evacuation in the Pacific Theater. From 1953 through 1997, the 64th provided airlift services, including during the Vietnam War. Repurposed as a refueling squadron in 2002, the 64th was active in the Air Force Reserve from 2003 until 2007, and then reactivated in October 2009.

== Mission ==
The squadron is part of the Total Force Initiative:

The aim of the Total Force Integration effort is to integrate regular U.S. Air Force airlift and tanker flying units with existing Air National Guard and U.S. Air Force Reserve wings, with the intention of sharing operations and maintenance functions, increasing active duty access to aircraft to meet steady state operational requirements, and taking advantage of the opportunity to season Air Force personnel with the operational experience located in Air Reserve Components.

== History ==
=== World War II ===
The 64th flew aerial transportation and evacuation in the South and Southwest Pacific from 7 August 1943 until c. 14 August 1945. The squadron received a Navy Unit Commendation for its service at part of the South Pacific Combat Air Transport Command (SCAT) from August 1943 to July 1944.

=== Reserves and Korean mobilisation ===
The 64th flew aerial transportation and evacuation between Japan and Korea from 19 May through 31 December 1952.

=== Reserve airlift operations ===
In 1957, the squadron moved on paper from Portland International Airport to Niagara Falls Municipal Airport, where is assumed the mission, personnel, and equipment of the 700th Troop Carrier Squadron. The squadron trained and provided airlift services from, January 1953 to March 1997, including airlift to Vietnam during the late 1960s and to Southwest Asia in 1990–1991. It participated in various training exercises and airlift missions worldwide until inactivation on 31 March 1997.

=== Reserve air refueling operations ===
Redesignated as the 64th Air Refueling Squadron on 22 November 2002, the 64th was active in the Air Force Reserve from 1 April 2003 until 23 June 2007. During this time, it was part of the 939th Operations Group based at Portland Air Reserve Station in Oregon.

=== Associate status ===
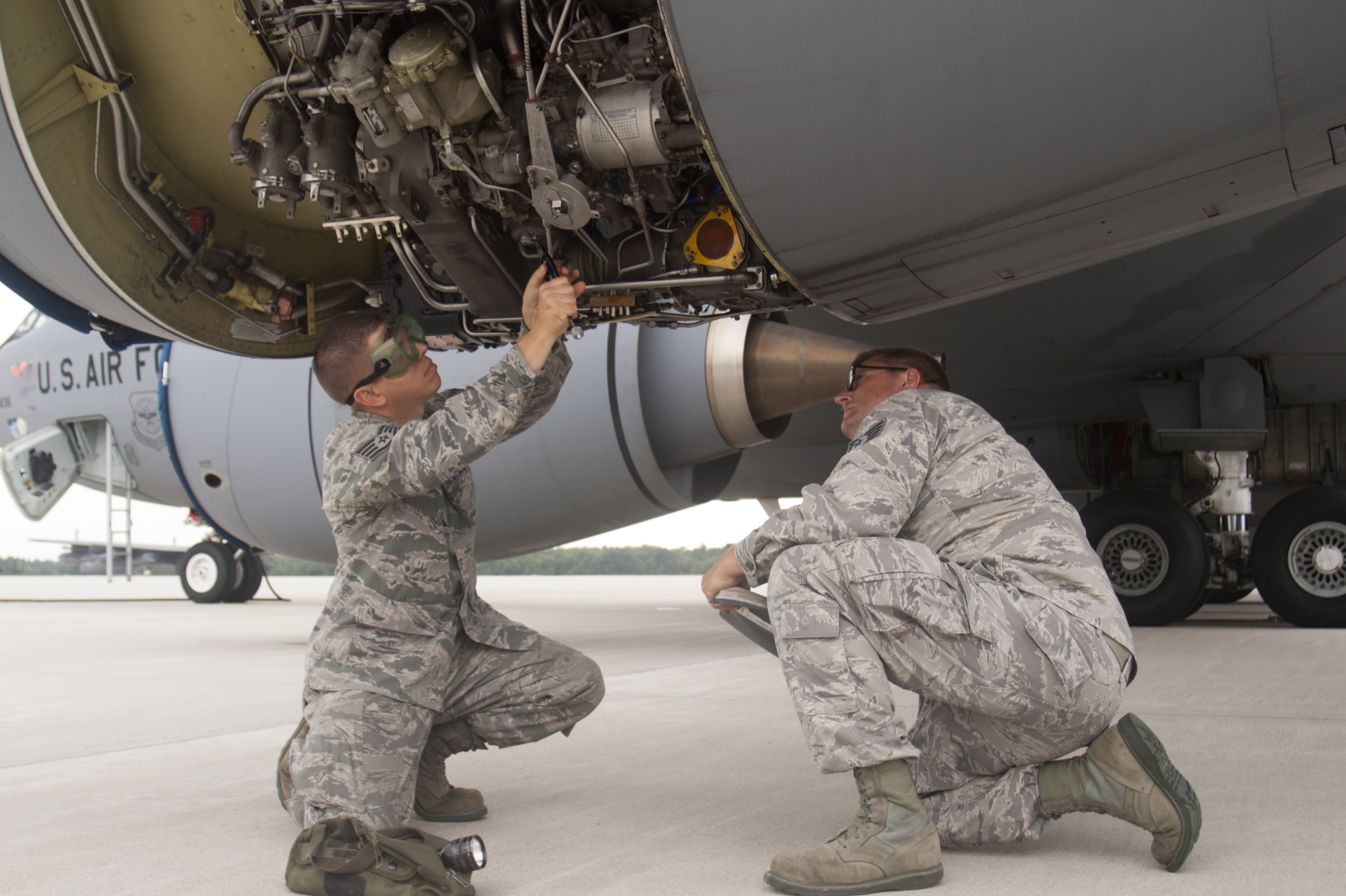
64 ARS and 157 ARW personnel working at Pease Air National Guard Base in September 2013

The 64th Air Refueling Squadron was activated at Pease Air National Guard Base, New Hampshire, on 2 October 2009 as part of the 22d Air Refueling Wing. It is part of the Total Force Initiative and works with the 157th Air Refueling Wing, New Hampshire Air National Guard. This was the first time that an active duty Air Force unit returned to Pease since the base was closed in 1991. On 9 January 2013, the Air Force announced that Pease would be in the running to host the first Boeing KC-46 Pegasus tankers as they entered service. In August 2014, Air Force leaders announced that the 157th would become the first Air National Guard unit to equip with the KC-46A. The Pegasus was scheduled to enter the Air Force inventory during fiscal year 2019; the first KC-46A arrived at Pease on 8 August 2019. The 12th and final KC-46A was delivered on 5 February 2021.

== Lineage ==
- Constituted as the 64th Troop Carrier Squadron on 7 December 1942

Activated on 12 December 1942
Inactivated on 15 May 1946

- Activated in the reserve on 5 April 1947
- Redesignated 64th Troop Carrier Squadron, Medium on 27 June 1949

Ordered to active service on 1 April 1951
Inactivated on 1 January 1953

- Activated in the reserve on 1 January 1953

Ordered to active service on 28 October 1962
Relieved from active service on 28 November 1962
Redesignated 64th Tactical Airlift Squadron on 1 July 1967
Redesignated 64th Airlift Squadron on 1 February 1992
Inactivated on 31 March 1997

- Redesignated 64th Air Refueling Squadron on 22 November 2002

Activated in the reserve on 1 April 2003
Inactivated on 23 June 2007

- Activated on 1 October 2009

=== Assignments ===
- 403d Troop Carrier Group, 12 December 1942 – 15 May 1946
- 419th Troop Carrier Group, 3 August 1947
- 403d Troop Carrier Group, 27 June 1949 – 1 January 1953
- 403d Troop Carrier Group, 1 January 1953
- 403d Troop Carrier Wing, 14 April 1959
- 928th Troop Carrier Group (later 928th Tactical Airlift Group, 928th Airlift Group), 11 February 1963
- 928th Operations Group, 1 August 1992 – 1 July 1997
- 939th Operations Group, 1 April 2003 – 23 June 2007
- 22d Operations Group, 1 Oct 2009 – present

=== Stations ===
- Bowman Field, Kentucky, 12 December 1942
- Alliance Army Air Field, Nebraska, 18 December 1942
- Pope Field, North Carolina, 3 May 1943
- Baer Field, Indiana, 20 June – 17 July 1943
- Tontouta Airfield, New Caledonia, 1 August 1943
- Espiritu Santo, 7 August 1943
- Henderson Field, Guadalcanal, 1 November 1943
- Biak, 16 September 1944 (operated from Wakde Airfield, Netherlands East Indies, 2–21 October 1944, and Noemfoor, schouten Islands, 29 October 1944 – 1 January 1945)
- Dulag Airfield, Leyte, Philippines, 16 July 1945
- Clark Field, Luzon, Philippines, c. January–15 May 1946
- Olmsted Field, Pennsylvania, 5 April 1947
- Portland Municipal Airport, Oregon, 27 June 1949 – 29 March 1952
- Ashiya Air Base, Japan, 14 April 1952 – 1 January 1953
- Portland International Airport, Oregon, 1 January 1953
- Niagara Falls Municipal Airport, New York, 16 November 1957
- O'Hare International Airport (later O'Hare Reserve Facility, O'Hare Air Reserve Forces Facility, O'Hare Air Reserve Station), Illinois, 25 March 1958 – 31 March 1997
- Portland International Airport, Oregon, 1 April 2003 – 23 June 2007
- Pease Air National Guard Base, New Hampshire, 1 Oct 2009 – present

=== Aircraft ===
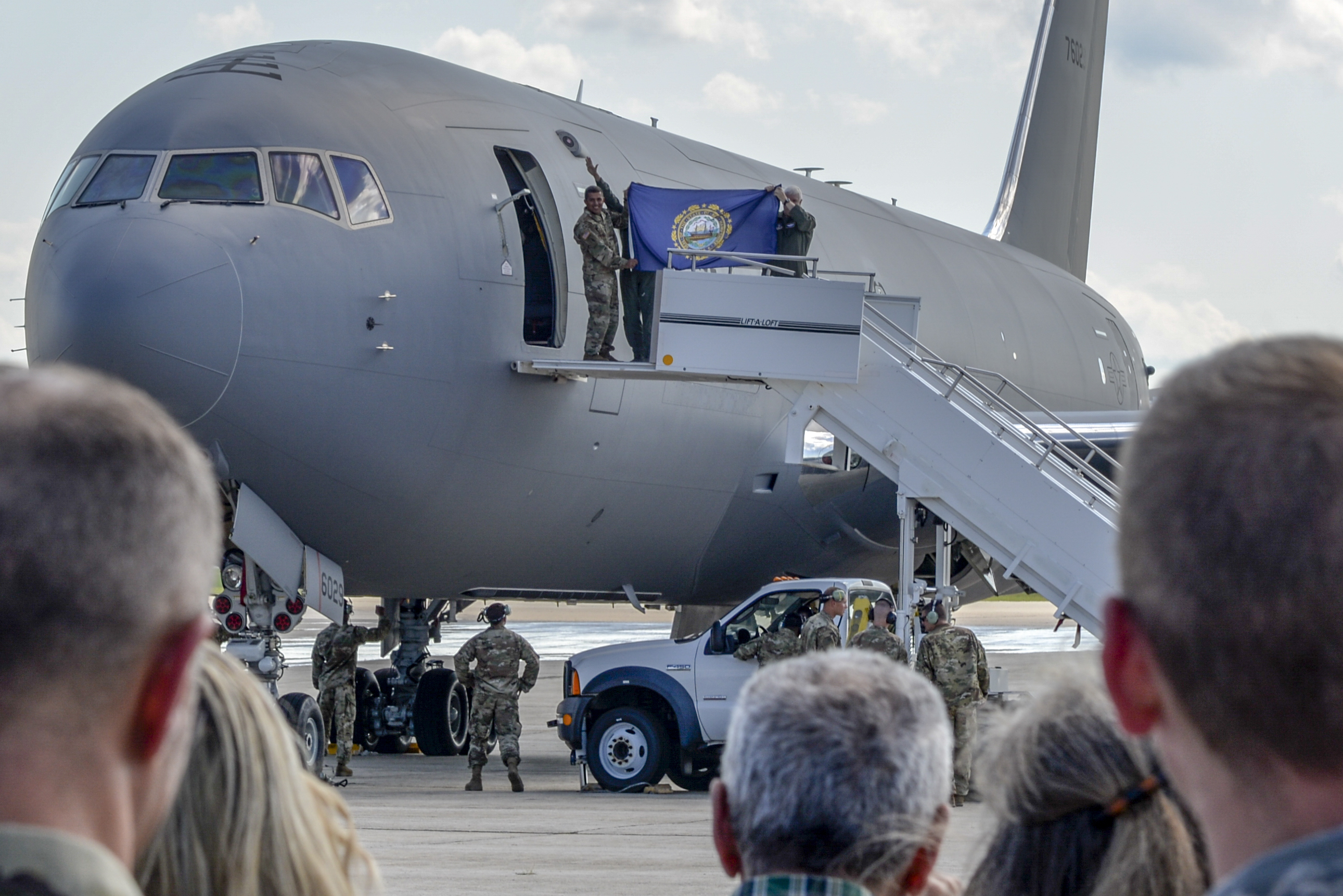
The first KC-46A arriving at Pease on 8 August 2019

- Douglas C-47 Skytrain (1943–1945)
- Curtiss C-46 Commando (1945, 1947–1950, 1951–1952)
- Fairchild C-119 Flying Boxcar (1952, 1957–1970)
- Lockheed C-130 Hercules (1970–1997)
- Boeing KC-135 Stratotanker (2003–2008, 2009–24 March 2019)
- Boeing KC-46A Pegasus, (8 August 2019 – present)

== Sources ==
- Maurer, Maurer, ed. (1982) [1969]. Combat Squadrons of the Air Force, World War II (PDF) (reprint ed.). Washington, DC: Office of Air Force History. ISBN 0-405-12194-6. LCCN 70605402. OCLC 72556. Archived from the original (PDF) on 20 December 2016.
- Armstrong, William. (2017). Marine Air Group 25 and SCAT (Images of Aviation). Arcadia. ISBN 1467127434.
- See also thirsty13th.com, the official website of a sister squadron of the 64th TCS in 1943–1945. The site offers a book with much information about the 64th Troop Carrier Squadron.
- AFHRA 64th Air Refueling Squadron History (accessed 24 December 2009)
