= 66th Training Squadron =

66th Training Squadron

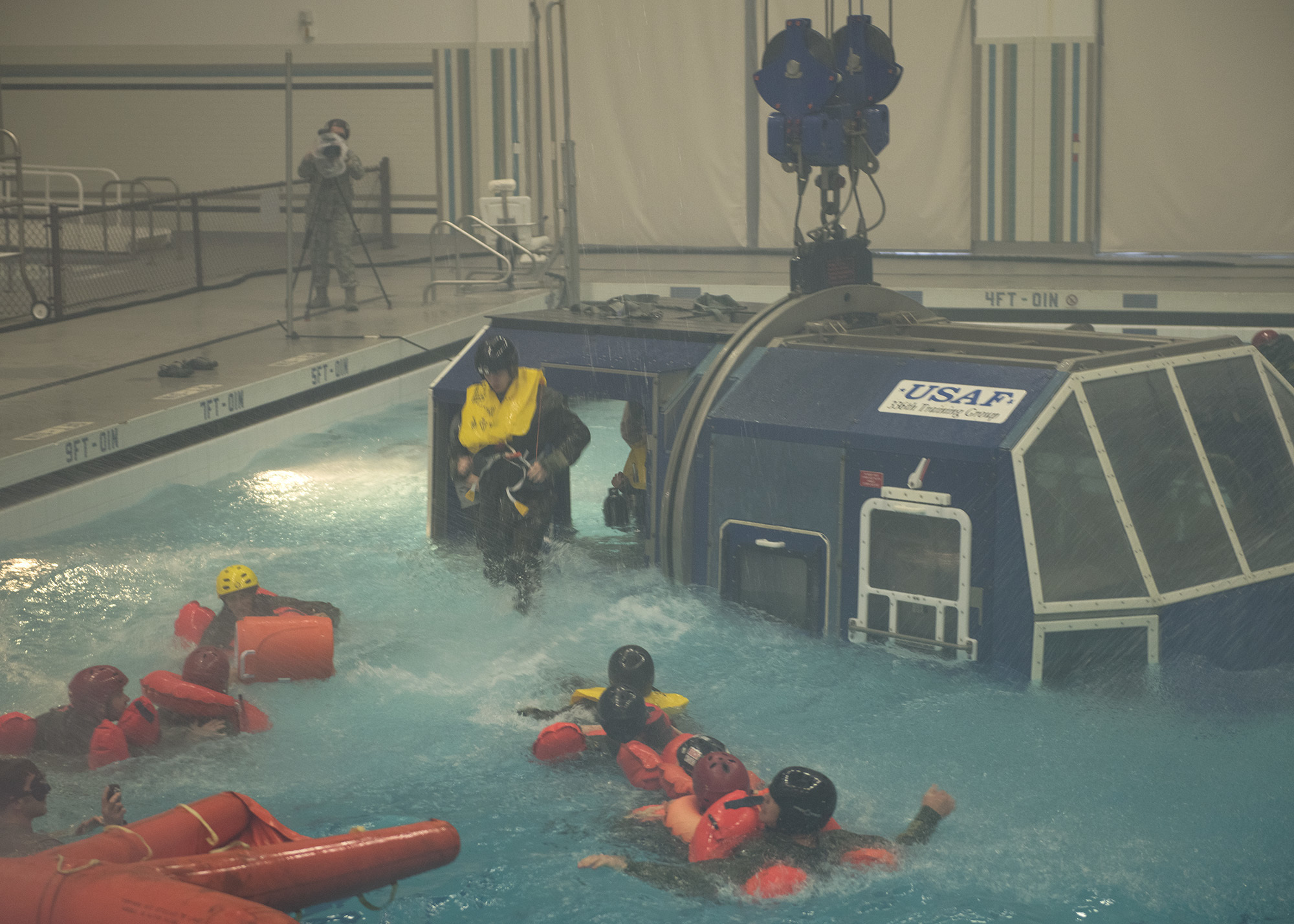
- Students escape from a simulated crashed aircraft during water survival training
- Active: 1942–1946; 1947–1951; 1971–present
- Country: United States
- Branch: United States Air Force
- Role: survival training
- Part of: Air Education and Training Command
- Garrison/HQ: Fairchild Air Force Base
- Motto(s): Learn and Return
- Engagements: Southwest Pacific Theater
- Decorations: Distinguished Unit Citation; Philippine Presidential Unit Citation

Insignia
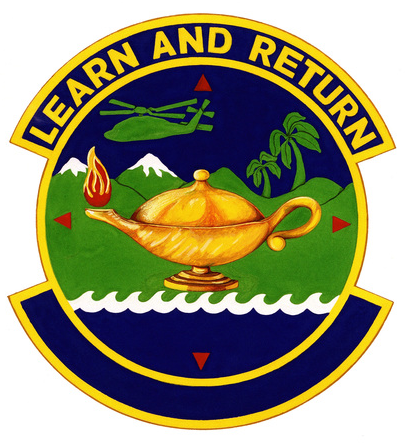
- 66th Training Sq emblem (Note: Originally approved for the 3614th Combat Crew Training Squadron.)

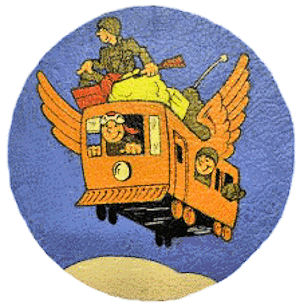
- 66th Troop Carrier Squadron emblem (Note: Approved 15 December 1944.)

The 66th Training Squadron is an active unit of the United States Air Force. Its current assignment is with the 336th Training Group at Fairchild Air Force Base where is performs the training for the SERE instructor course for the USAF.

== History ==
=== World War II ===
During World War II, the squadron operated primarily in the Southwest Pacific Theater, conveying personnel, dropping parachutists, towing gliders, transporting cargo, munitions and evacuating casualties in numerous campaigns. The squadron earned both the United States Distinguished Unit Citation and the Philippine Presidential Unit Citation for its combat operations.

=== Air Force reserve ===
As part of the Air Force Reserve during the postwar years, the squadron performed peacetime transport missions. Ordered to active service during the Korean War, the units' equipment and personnel were reassigned to Far East Air Force active duty units. It was then inactivated as a paper unit.

=== Survival training ===
The 3614th Combat Crew Training Squadron was activated at Clark Air Base, Philippines in April 1971, when Air Training Command assumed responsibility for operating th Jungle Survival School there from Pacific Air Forces.

== Lineage ==
66th Troop Carrier Squadron

- Constituted as the 66th Troop Carrier Squadron on 7 December 1942

Activated on 12 December 1942
Inactivated on 15 January 1946

- Activated in the reserve on 3 August 1947

Redesignated the 66th Troop Carrier Squadron (Medium) on 27 June 1949.
Ordered to active service on 1 April 1951.
Inactivated on 17 April 1951

- Consolidated with the 3614th Combat Crew Training Squadron as the 66th Crew Training Squadron on 1 January 1993

66th Training Squadron

- Designated as the 3614th Combat Crew Training Squadron

Organized on 1 April 1971
Consolidated with the 66th Troop Carrier Squadron as the 66th Crew Training Squadron on 1 January 1993
Redesignated 66th Training Squadron on 1 April 1994

=== Assignments ===
- 403d Troop Carrier Group, 12 December 1942
- Fifth Air Force, 21 July 1943
- 54th Troop Carrier Wing, 13 August 1943
- 433d Troop Carrier Group, 9 November 1943
- 403d Troop Carrier Group, 20 February 1945 – 15 January 1946
- 419th Troop Carrier Group, 3 August 1947
- 403d Troop Carrier Group, 27 June 1949 – 17 April 1951
- 3636th Combat Crew Training Group (later 336th Crew Training Group, 336th Training Group), 1 April 1971 – present

=== Stations ===
- Bowman Field, Kentucky, 12 December 1942
- Alliance Army Air Field, Nebraska, 18 December 1942
- Pope Field, North Carolina, 3 May 1943
- Baer Field, Indiana, 18 June – 6 July 1943
- Port Moresby Airfield Complex, New Guinea, 21 July 1943
- Nadzab Airfield Complex, New Guinea, 25 September 1943 (operated from Tadji Airfield, New Guinea, 12 May – June 1944)
- Mokmer Airfield, Biak, Netherlands East Indies, 18 November 1944 (operated from Hill Field, Mindoro, and Dulag Airfield, Leyte, Philippines after 18 January 1945)
- Wama Airfield, Morotai, Netherlands East Indies, 27 February 1945
- Dulag Airfield, Leyte, Philippines, 15 August 1945 – 15 January 1946
- Roanoke Municipal Airport, Virginia, 3 August 1947
- Portland Municipal Airport, Oregon, 27 June 1949 – 17 April 1951
- Clark Air Base, Philippines, 1 April 1971
- Fairchild Air Force Base, Washington, 4 April 1981 – present

=== Aircraft ===
- Douglas C-47 Skytrain, 1943–1945
- Curtiss C-46 Commando, 1944–1945
- Stinson L-5 Sentinel, 1945
