= 419th Operations Group =

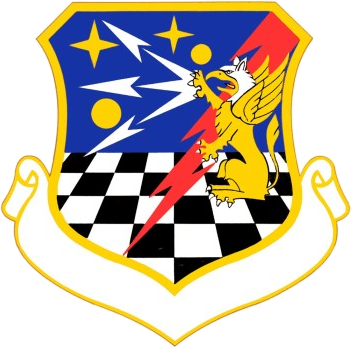
- Emblem of the 419th Operations Group
- Active: 1944–1946; 1947–1951; 1956–1957; 1992–present
- Country: United States
- Branch: United States Air Force

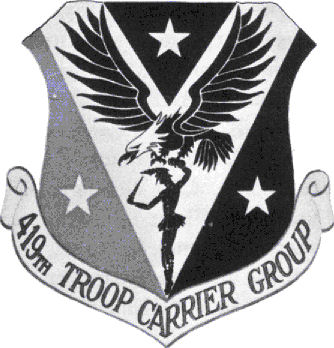
Emblem of the 419th Troop Carrier Group (1950s)

The 419th Operations Group (419 OG) is an operational component of the 419th Fighter Wing, stationed at Hill Air Force Base, Utah.

The 419 OG plans and organizes operational programs and establishes policies and procedures for operational training functions. It directs, monitors and supports operations programs, including flight operations, standardization/evaluation, weapons and tactics, intelligence, operations and training and life support.

The group's designated flying squadron is the 466th Fighter Squadron. Pilots from the unit train for both air-to-air and air-to-ground attack missions in the F-16 C/D model aircraft.

== History ==
Activated on Guam on 31 January 1945. Assigned to Seventh Air Force. From late January 1945 to mid-February 1946 the 419th Troop Carrier Group's headquarters was assigned neither squadrons nor aircraft, but was composed primarily of a few detachments on Saipan, Tinian, Guam (all in the Mariana Islands), and Angaur (in the Palau Islands), the latter detachment moving to Iwo Jima in March 1945. The detachments operated transportation terminals that assisted in moving troops, equipment, food, and mail to, and in evacuating personnel from, combat areas.

When activated again, the 419th controlled several Reserve units at five separate locations. In mid-1949 the group moved without personnel or equipment to Scott AFB, IL, where it became the combat component of the new 419th Troop Carrier Wing. Group pilots trained in T-6, T-7, T-11, and C/TC-47 aircraft until c. March 1951.

Beginning July 1956, the group (and its three squadrons) trained in C-123 assault airlift operations. For the next 16 months the group airlifted, airdropped, and airlanded troops and cargo to support tactical operations, special missions, and U.S. Army and joint airborne exercises, worldwide.

From August 1992 it trained for and flew fighter missions. Between December 1994 and February 1995, took part patrols to enforce the no-fly zone over northern Iraq.

=== Lineage ===
- Established as 419th Troop Carrier Group on 1 December 1944

Activated on 31 January 1945
Inactivated on 15 February 1946

- Activated in the Reserve on 22 March 1947

Redesignated 419th Troop Carrier Group, Medium on 27 June 1949
Ordered to active service on 1 May 1951
Inactivated on 2 May 1951

- Redesignated 419th Troop Carrier Group, Assault, Fixed Wing on 24 February 1956

Activated on 9 July 1956
Inactivated on 11 December 1957

- Redesignated: 419th Military Airlift Group on 31 July 1985 (Remained inactive)
- Redesignated: 419th Operations Group on 1 August 1992

Activated in the Reserve on 1 August 1992.

=== Assignments ===
- Central Pacific Base Command, 31 January 1945
- Twentieth Air Force, 6 December 1945
- Pacific Air Command, U.S. Army, 1 January 1946
- Far East Air Service Command, 1–15 February 1946
- Eleventh Air Force, 22 March 1947

Attached to 69th Troop Carrier Wing, 22 March – 16 October 1947

- 69 Troop Carrier Wing (later, 69 Air Division), 17 October 1947
- 419th Troop Carrier Wing, 27 June 1949 – 2 May 1951
- Eighteenth Air Force, 9 July 1956

Attached to 463d Troop Carrier Wing, 9 July 1956–

- Ninth Air Force, 1 September – 11 December 1957

Remained attached to 463d Troop Carrier Wing, to 25 September 1957
Attached to 838th Air Division, 26 September – 11 December 1957

- 419th Fighter Wing, 1 August 1992–present

=== Components ===
- 12th Rescue Squadron: 22 March 1947 – 27 June 1949
- 15th Fighter Squadron: 30 September 1947 – 27 June 1949
- 63d Troop Carrier Squadron: 21 June 1947 – 27 June 1949
- 64th Troop Carrier Squadron: 3 August 1947 – 27 June 1949
- 65th Troop Carrier Squadron: 9 August 1947 – 27 June 1949
- 66th Troop Carrier Squadron: 3 August 1947 – 27 June 1949
- 79th Troop Carrier Squadron: 11 April 1948 – 27 June 1949
- 339th Troop Carrier Squadron: 27 June 1949 – 2 May 1951; 9 July 1956 – 11 December 1957
- 340th Troop Carrier Squadron: 27 June 1949 – 2 May 1951; 9 July 1956 – 11 December 1957
- 341st Troop Carrier Squadron: 27 June 1949 – 2 May 1951; 9 July 1956 – 11 December 1957
- 342d Troop Carrier Squadron: 27 June 1949 – 2 May 1951
- 466th Fighter Squadron: 1 August 1992–present

=== Stations ===
- Agana Airfield, Guam, Marianas Islands, 31 January 1945 – 15 February 1946
- Richmond AAB (later, Byrd Field), Virginia, 22 March 1947
- Scott AFB, Illinois, 27 June 1949 – 2 May 1951
- Ardmore AFB, Oklahoma, 9 July 1956 – 11 December 1957
- Hill AFB, Utah, 1 August 1992 – present

=== Aircraft ===
- C/TC-46 Commando, 1949–1951
- C-123 Provider, 1956–1957
- F-16 Falcon, 1992–2017
- F-35 Lightning II, 2015–present
