= Davis Field (Oklahoma) =

Muskogee-Davis Regional Airport (former Muskogee Army Airfield)
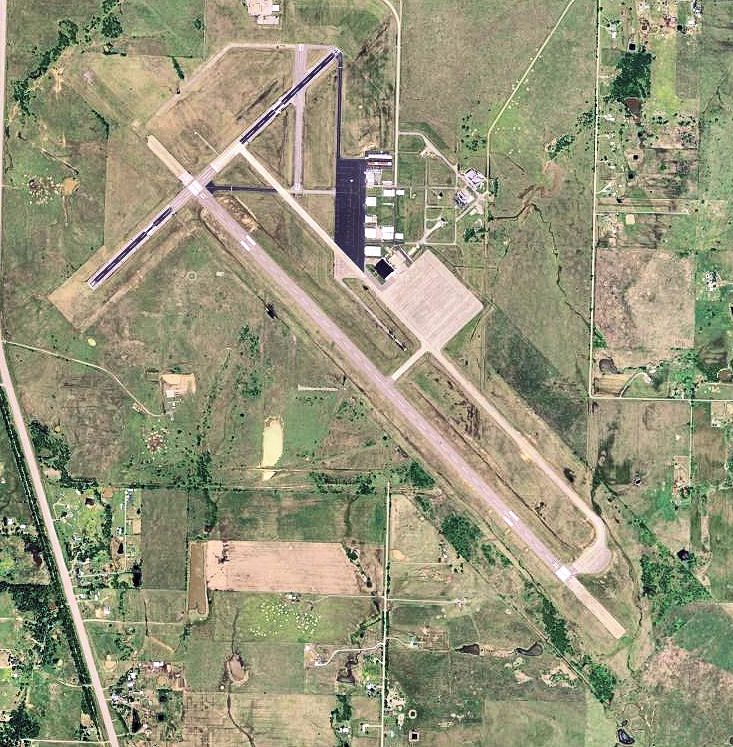
- USGS 2006 orthophoto
- IATA: MKO; ICAO: KMKO; FAA LID: MKO

Summary
- Airport type: Public
- Owner: City of Muskogee
- Serves: Muskogee, Oklahoma
- Elevation AMSL: 611 ft (186 m)
- Coordinates: 35°39′28″N 095°21′42″W

Map
- Location in Oklahoma

Runways
Direction	Length		Surface
Direction	ft	m	Surface
13/31	7,202	2,195	Asphalt
4/22	4,498	1,371	Asphalt/Concrete
18/36	1,904	580	Asphalt

Statistics (2008)
- Aircraft operations: 8,500
- Based aircraft: 58
- Source: Federal Aviation Administration

Muskogee-Davis Regional Airport (IATA: MKO, ICAO: KMKO, FAA LID: MKO), formerly Davis Field, is a city-owned Regional Business Airport located seven miles south of Muskogee, Oklahoma. The National Plan of Integrated Airport Systems for 2011–2015 called it a general aviation facility.

The airport can accommodate light through heavy transport jet aircraft. It is open 24 hours and is attended 8:00 a.m. to 5:00 p.m. with after–hours service on request.

== Facilities ==
Muskogee-Davis Regional AIrport covers 1,627 acres (583 ha) at an elevation of 611 feet (186 m). It has three runways: 13/31 is 7,202 by 150 feet (2,195 x 46 m) asphalt; 4/22 is 4,498 by 75 feet (1,371 x 23 m) asphalt; 18/36 is 1,904 by 60 feet (580 x 18 m) asphalt.

In the year ending August 5, 2008 the airport had 8,500 aircraft operations, average 23 per day: 80% general aviation and 20% military. 58 aircraft were then based at the airport: 86% single-engine, 9% multi-engine, 3% helicopter, and 2% ultralight.

Davis Field Aviation is the fixed-base operator (FBO). Hours of operation are 8:00 a.m. to 5:00 p.m. seven days a week. Jet fuel as well as full and self serve Avgas are available.

== History ==
=== Military use ===
Named in honor of Muskogee native Jack Davis, who was killed in action in the South Pacific in World War II, Muskogee-Davis Regional Airport was previously known as Davis Field, and prior to that, Muskogee Army Airfield, a U.S. Army Air Forces installation. Built in 1941–42 by U.S. Army Corps of Engineers for the War Department, the initial runway was constructed by commandeering a straight stretch of U.S. Highway 64. The facility was leased by the U.S. government in October 1942 to serve as a ground air support base to nearby Camp Gruber. It was also used as a combat crew training site for aerial photographic reconnaissance during World War II. The government lease for wartime use was terminated on August 15, 1947.

Muskogee-Davis Regional Airport was leased again by the U.S. government in December 1956 for use as an Air Force Reserve installation. In early 1957, the 65th Troop Carrier Squadron (65 TCS) of the Air Force Reserve (AFRES) was stationed at Davis Field, operating C-119 Flying Boxcar transport aircraft for Tactical Air Command (TAC) operations. The 929th Troop Carrier Group (929 TCG) of the Air Force Reserve was later established at Davis Field on 11 February 1963 as the headquarters for the 65 TCS, along with group headquarters, a Combat Support Squadron, Materiel Squadron and a Tactical Infirmary to support the 65 TCS.

The group mission was to organize, recruit and train Air Force Reserve personnel in the tactical airlift of airborne forces, their equipment and supplies and delivery of these forces and materials by airdrop, landing or cargo extraction systems.

The group was one of three C-119 groups assigned to the 403d Troop Carrier Wing (403 TCW) in 1963, the others being the 927th Troop Carrier Group, at Selfridge Air Force Base, Michigan and the 928th Troop Carrier Group at O'Hare International Airport, Illinois.

In 1963, the group moved US troops to the Dominican Republic and airlifted Christmas gifts destined for US servicemen in Vietnam. Reassigned to the 433d Troop Carrier Wing (443 TCW) at Kelly Air Force Base, Texas in 1964, the 929th, however, remained at Davis Field.

In November 1965, Defense Secretary Robert S. McNamara announced that the 929th Troop Carrier Group would be moved from Davis Field because the facility was inadequate for the Air Force's newer transport jets that the unit was expected to eventually transition to. Instead of being moved, the unit was instead inactivated on 1 July 1966 due to budget reductions caused by the cost of the Vietnam War. The closure which was completed the following June, affected 798 reservists, eight active duty and Active Guard and Reserve (AGR) personnel and 181 Air Reserve Technician (ART) civilians. At this point, control was returned to the local civilian government for use as a civilian airport.

Today, in addition to its role as a civilian general aviation facility, Muskogee-Davis Regional Airport continues to be used by the USAF for transient training operations from Vance AFB, Altus AFB, Tinker AFB and Will Rogers Air National Guard Base.

=== Historical airline service ===
Davis Field was first served by both Braniff International Airways and Mid-Continent Airlines beginning in 1946. Braniff served Muskogee as one of many stops on a route between Denver and Memphis which included stops at Oklahoma City, Tulsa, and Little Rock. Mid-Continent served the airport as one of several stops on a route between Kansas City and New Orleans. The two carriers used Douglas DC-3 aircraft and merged in 1952 under the Braniff name. Service continued on the Kansas City - New Orleans route but was discontinued on the Denver - Memphis route. Braniff ended flights at Muskogee in the mid-1950s.

Central Airlines began service in the early 1950s using DC-3s as well. Central flew a route between Amarillo and Dallas/Fort Worth, Texas which circumvented through Oklahoma stopping at Tulsa and Muskogee among several other smaller cities. By 1961 Muskogee became a stop on a new route between Dallas and Kansas City which also stopped in Tulsa and several smaller cities.

In 1967 Central merged into the original Frontier Airlines (1950-1986) which continued to serve Muskogee with DC-3s as a stop on a route between Kansas City and Dallas. Frontier soon upgraded their service with much larger Convair 580 aircraft and Muskogee became a stop on a route between Denver and Memphis, much like the first route of Braniff Airways. Frontier ended service at the end of 1974. SMB Stage Lines, a small commuter airline, also served Davis Field beginning in 1968 on a route between Dallas and Tulsa. SMB worked to replace Frontier but instead ended service by early 1975 to become an all cargo carrier. Muskogee has not seen commercial air service since that time.

== See also ==
- List of airports in Oklahoma
