= John J. Closner III =

John James Closner III
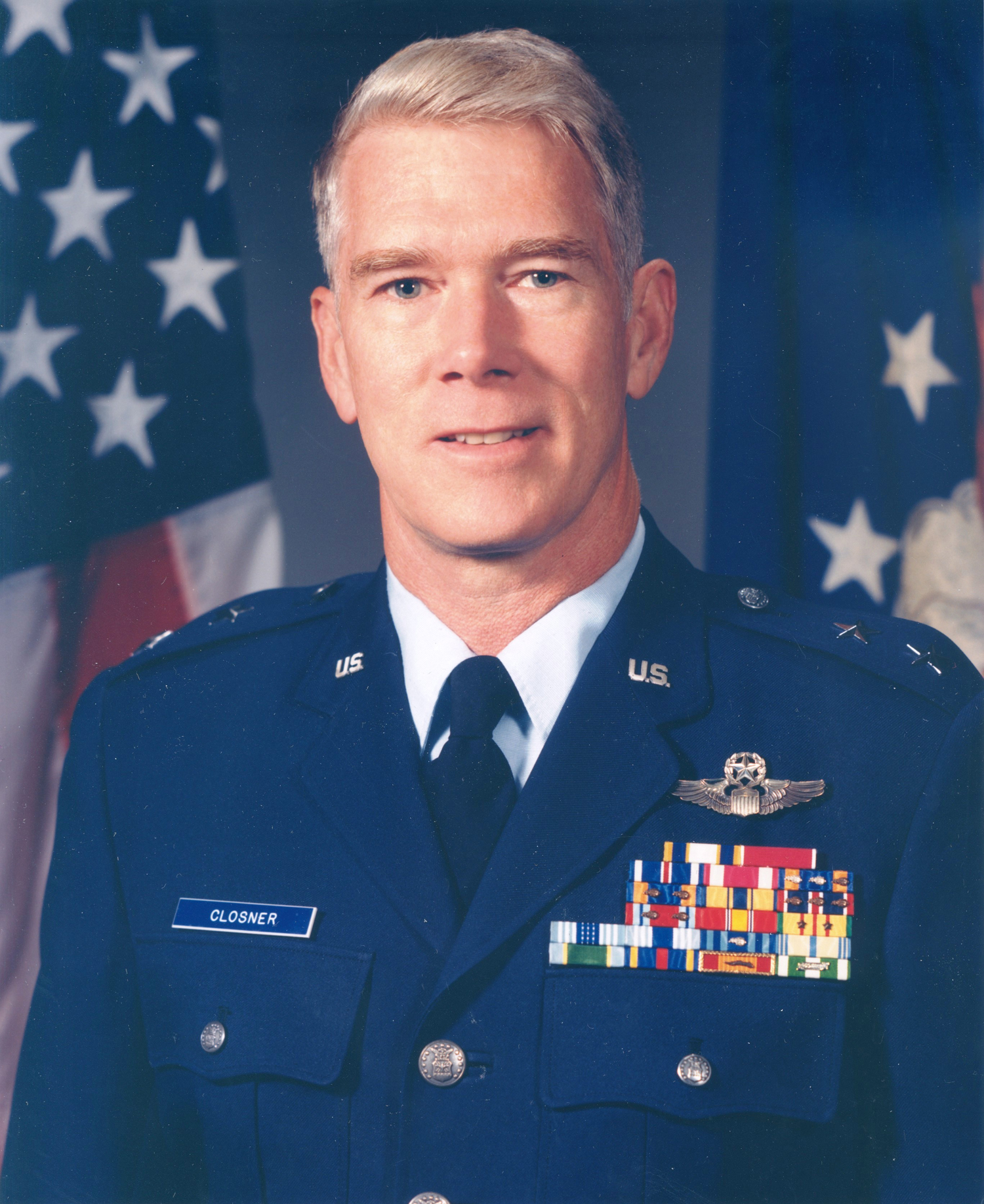
- Born: March 27, 1940 (age 86); Houston, Texas, U.S.
- Military career
- Allegiance: United States of America
- Branch: United States Air Force
- Service years: 1962–1996
- Rank: Major general
- Unit: United States Air Force Reserve Command

John James Closner III (born March 27, 1940) is a retired major general in the United States Air Force who served as commander of the United States Air Force Reserve Command, Headquarters U.S. Air Force, Washington D.C., and commander, Headquarters Air Force Reserve, a separate operating agency located at Robins Air Force Base, Georgia. As chief of the Air Force Reserve, he served as the principal adviser on Reserve matters to the Air Force Chief of Staff. As commander of AFRES, he had full responsibility for the supervision of U.S. Air Force Reserve units around the world.

Closner was born in 1940, in Houston and graduated from Bayside High School, Long Island, New York, in 1958. He earned a bachelor's degree in business administration from Texas A&M University in 1962. The general completed Squadron Officer School in 1971, Air Command and Staff College in 1973, and Industrial College of the Armed Forces in 1976.

He was commissioned through the Air Force Reserve Officer Training Corps program at Texas A&M University. He received wings after pilot training at Reese Air Force Base, Texas, and then completed F-100 fighter training at Luke Air Force Base, Arizona. In August 1964 Closner was assigned to the 494th Tactical Fighter Squadron, Royal Air Force Station Lakenheath, England, where he flew the F-100.

In June 1967 he was assigned to the 615th Tactical Fighter Squadron, Phan Rang Air Base, South Vietnam, as an instructor pilot. He flew 300 combat missions and also had assignments as a standardization and evaluation officer, ground training officer and flying training officer.

Closner separated from active duty in July 1968 and flew for 18 months with Pan American Airlines. In February 1970 he joined the New Jersey Air National Guard as a full-time, civil service employee. He was assigned to the 177th Tactical Fighter Squadron, Atlantic City, where he flew the F-100 and F-105, and was chief of standardization and evaluation.

In January 1973 Closner was assigned to the 507th Tactical Fighter Group, Tinker Air Force Base, Oklahoma. He figured prominently in the command's first F-105 fighter conversion and served as chief of standardization and evaluation, and as an operations and training officer. He assumed command of the 465th Tactical Fighter Squadron at Tinker in November 1975.

In May 1978 Closner became commander of the 917th Tactical Fighter Group at Barksdale Air Force Base, Louisiana, and flew A-37s. Two years later the unit was the first in the Air Force Reserve to convert to A-10s. As commander, he also guided the activation of the first A-10 flight training school for the Air National Guard and the Air Force Reserve. He served as commander of the Air Force Reserve's first F-16 wing, the 419th Tactical Fighter Wing, Hill Air Force Base, Utah, from July 1983 until July 1987, when he became commander of 10th Air Force, Bergstrom Air Force Base, Texas. In July 19S9 he was assigned as deputy to the chief of Air Force Reserve, Air Force headquarters, and assumed his present duties in November 1990.

A command pilot with more than 5,000 flying hours, Closner has flown the A-10, A-37, F-16, F-100 and F-105. His military awards and decorations include the Distinguished Service Medal, Legion of Merit, Distinguished Flying Cross, Meritorious Service Medal, Air Medal with 14 oak leaf clusters, Air Force Commendation Medal and Air Force Outstanding Unit Award with three oak leaf clusters.

His civic affiliations include the Air Force Association, Reserve Officers Association, Bergstrom-Austin Community Council and Austin Military Affairs Council.

He was promoted to major general November 1, 1990, with same date of rank. He retired on April 1, 1996.
