= General McIntosh =

General McIntosh may refer to:

- James M. McIntosh (1828–1862), Confederate States Army brigadier general
- John Baillie McIntosh (1829–1888), Union Army brigadier general
- Lachlan McIntosh (1725–1806), Continental Army brigadier general
- Robert A. McIntosh (born 1943), U.S. Air Force major general
