= Bryan Radliff =

U.S. Air Force general

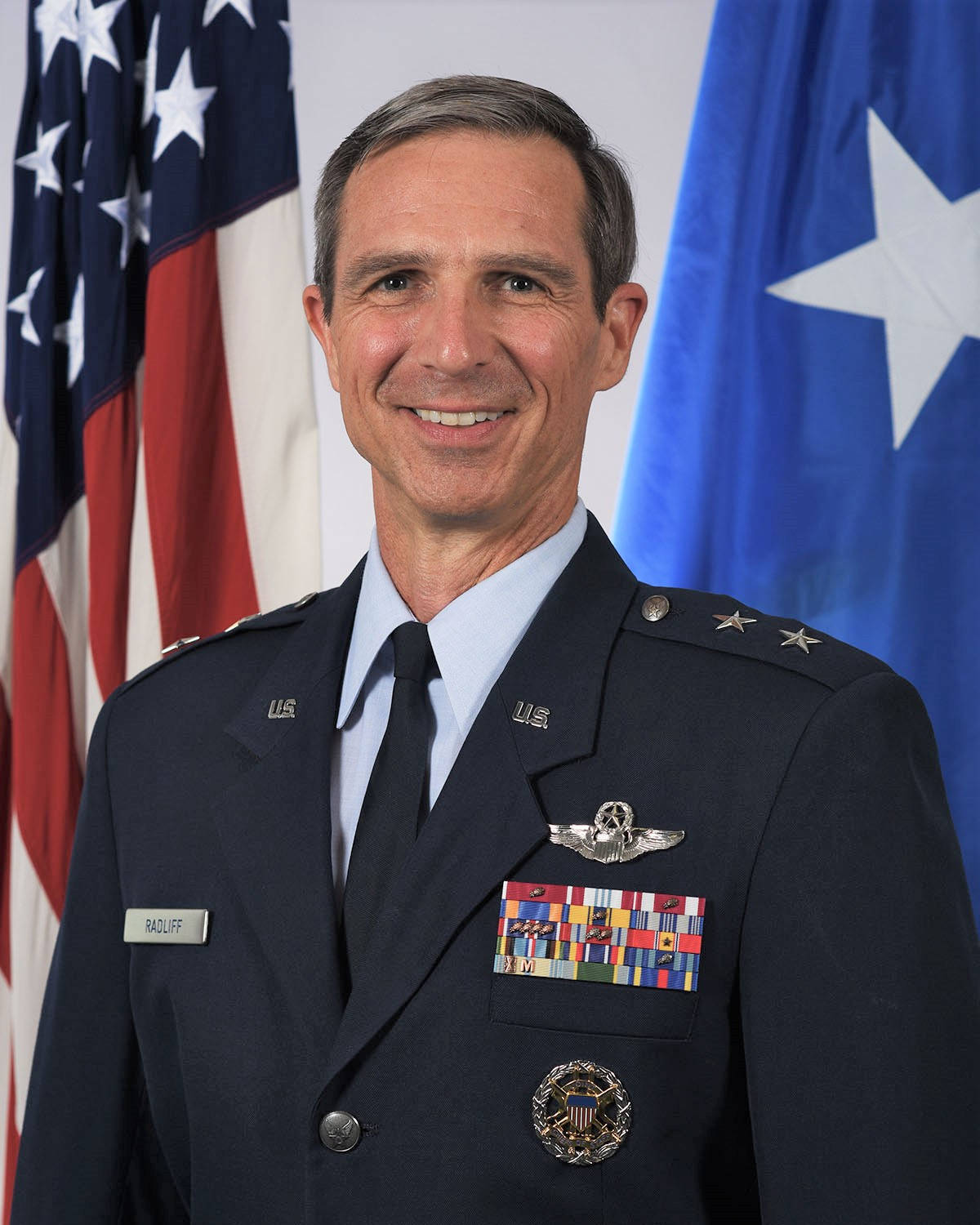
- Official portrait, 2020
- Military career
- Allegiance: United States
- Branch: United States Air Force
- Service years: 1988–2023
- Rank: Major General
- Commands: 10th Air Force; 419th Fighter Wing; 477th Fighter Group; 44th Fighter Group; Detachment 4, 307th Fighter Squadron
- Awards: Legion of Merit

Bryan P. Radliff is a retired United States Air Force major general who served as the Commander of the Tenth Air Force from 2021 to 2023. Previously, he was the Mobilization Assistant to the Commander of the First Air Force from 2018 to 2021.

Military offices
Preceded by Keith A. Knudson	Commander of the 419th Fighter Wing; 2012–2015	Succeeded by David Smith
Preceded by Brian K. Borgen	Commander of the Tenth Air Force; 2021–2023	Succeeded by Regina A. Sabric
