= Richard W. Scobee =

American Air Force Lieutenant general

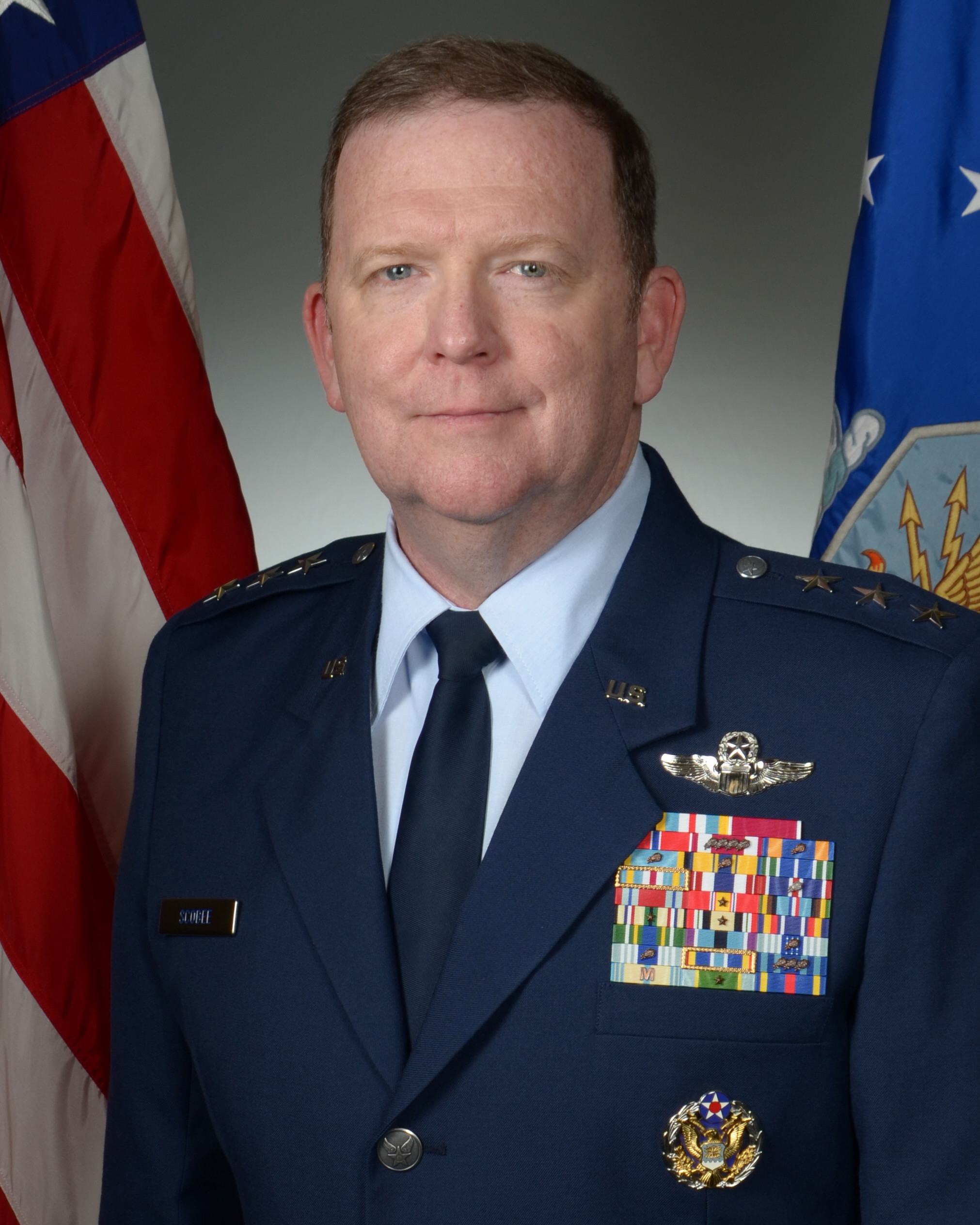
- Born: April 13, 1964 (age 62); Tucson, Arizona
- Military career
- Allegiance: United States
- Branch: United States Air Force
- Service years: 1986–2022
- Rank: Lieutenant General
- Commands: Air Force Reserve Command; Tenth Air Force; 301st Fighter Wing; 944th Fighter Wing; 944th Operations Group; 301st Fighter Squadron
- Conflicts: Iraq War
- Awards: Air Force Distinguished Service Medal (2); Defense Superior Service Medal; Legion of Merit (2); Bronze Star Medal

Richard William Scobee (born April 13, 1964) is a retired lieutenant general in the United States Air Force. Scobee was commander of the Air Force Reserve Command at Robins Air Force Base from 2018 to 2022. He is the son of Dick Scobee, an American test pilot and astronaut who perished in the Space Shuttle Challenger disaster.

== Air Force career ==
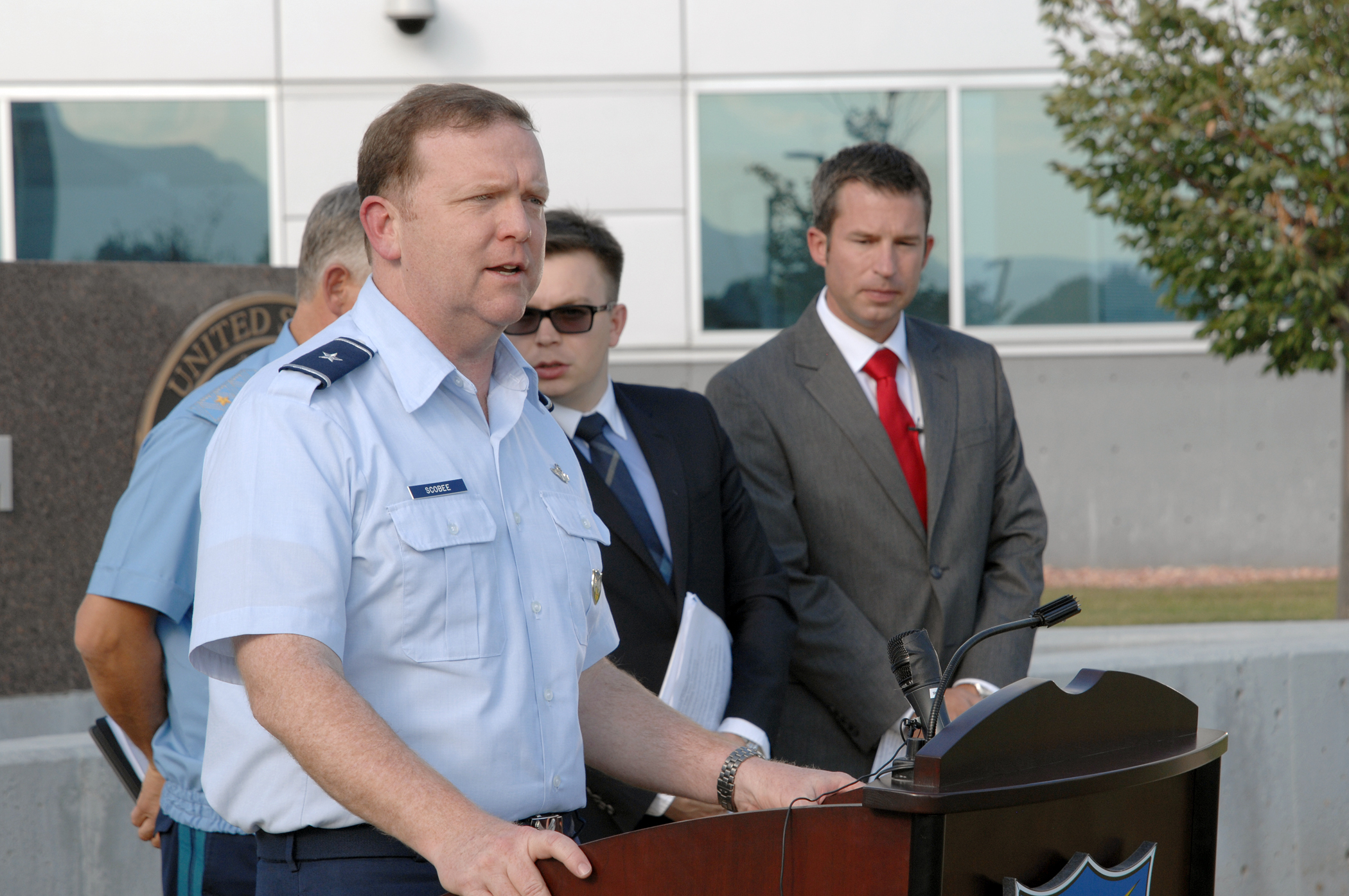
Scobee, as a brigadier general in 2012, speaking at the end of a NORAD exercise

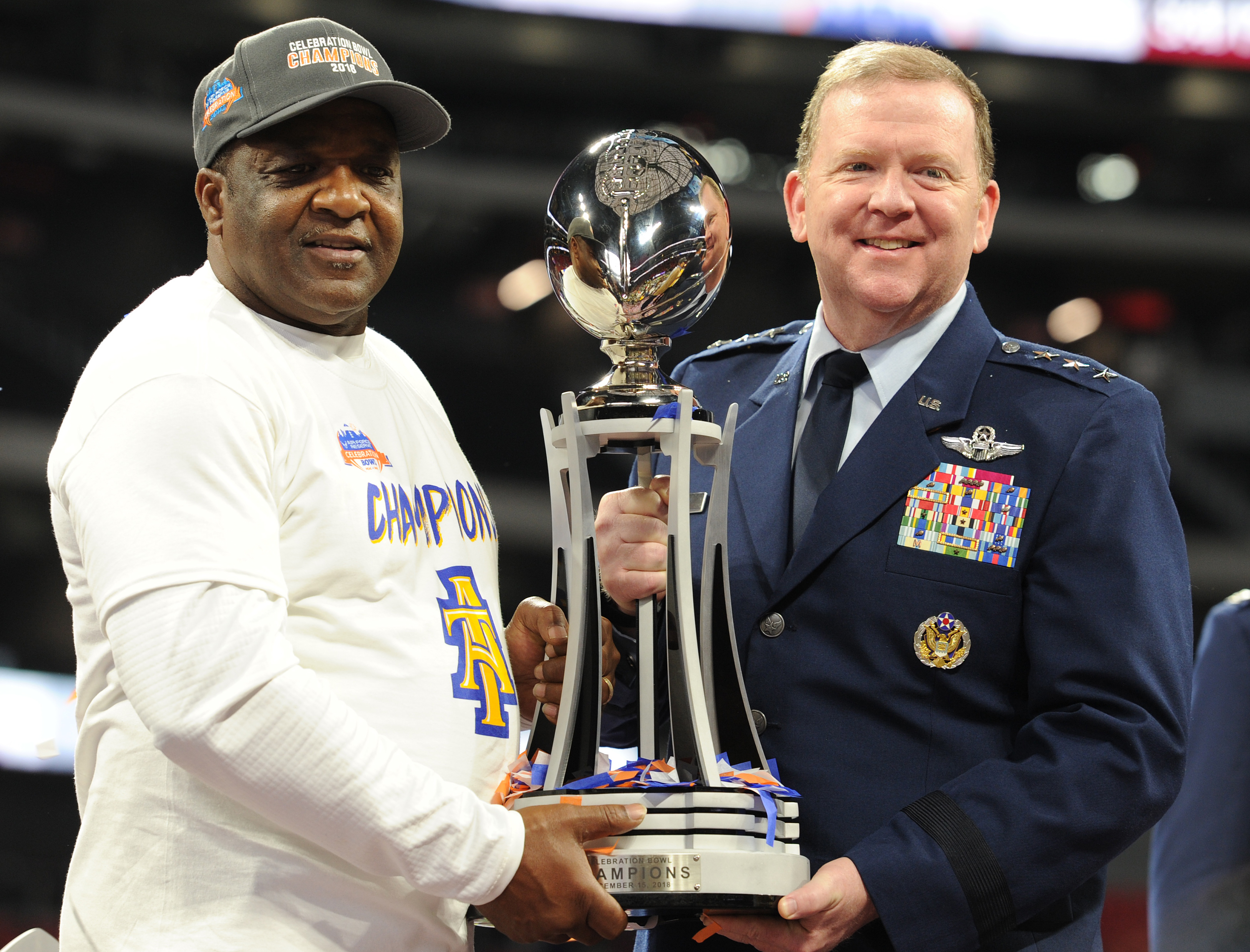
Scobee presenting the 2018 Celebration Bowl trophy to head coach Sam Washington

Richard Scobee was born in Tucson, Arizona, and raised in Houston, Texas. He graduated from the United States Air Force Academy and was commissioned as a second lieutenant in the United States Air Force in 1986. He attended Euro-NATO Joint Jet Pilot training (ENJJPT) at Sheppard Air Force Base in Wichita Falls, Texas, graduating in 1987. He became an F-16 Fighting Falcon pilot, and was stationed Macdill Air Force Base, Ramstein Air Base, Shaw Air Force Base, and Kunsan Air Base throughout his career. He served as the commander of the 301st Fighter Squadron and the 301st Fighter Wing at Naval Air Station Joint Reserve Base Fort Worth, and the 944th Operations Group and the 944th Fighter Wing at Luke Air Force Base. Additionally, he served as the commander of the 506th Air Expeditionary Group at Kirkuk Air Base in 2008. As a general officer, he has served as a Deputy Director of Operations at NORAD, the Commander of the Tenth Air Force, and as the Deputy Commander of Air Force Reserve Command. In September 2018, he assumed command of the Air Force Reserve Command.

== Awards and decorations ==
US Air Force Command Pilot Badge
Headquarters Air Force Badge

Air Force Distinguished Service Medal with one bronze oak leaf cluster
Defense Superior Service Medal
Legion of Merit with one bronze oak leaf cluster
Bronze Star Medal
Meritorious Service Medal with four bronze oak leaf clusters
Air Medal with oak leaf cluster
Aerial Achievement Medal with oak leaf cluster
Air Force Commendation Medal with oak leaf cluster
Army Achievement Medal
Joint Meritorious Unit Award
Air Force Meritorious Unit Award
Air Force Outstanding Unit Award with one silver oak leaf cluster
Combat Readiness Medal
National Defense Service Medal with one bronze service star
Armed Forces Expeditionary Medal
Southwest Asia Service Medal with one bronze service star
Iraq Campaign Medal
Global War on Terrorism Service Medal
Korea Defense Service Medal
Humanitarian Service Medal
Air Force Overseas Short Tour Service Ribbon with oak leaf cluster
Air Force Overseas Long Tour Service Ribbon
Air Force Expeditionary Service Ribbon with gold frame
Air Force Longevity Service Award with three bronze oak leaf clusters
Armed Forces Reserve Medal
Small Arms Expert Marksmanship Ribbon with service star
Air Force Training Ribbon

== Effective dates of promotions ==
Rank	Date
Second Lieutenant	May 28, 1986
First Lieutenant	May 28, 1988
Captain	May 28, 1990
Major	February 1, 1998
Lieutenant Colonel	September 12, 2002
Colonel	August 9, 2006
Brigadier General	December 22, 2010
Major General	March 26, 2015
Lieutenant General	September 7, 2018

Military offices
Preceded by William B. Binger	Commander of the Tenth Air Force; 2014–2017	Succeeded by Ronald B. Miller
Preceded by William B. Waldrop Jr.	Deputy Commander of the Air Force Reserve Command; 2017–2018	Succeeded by Kenneth D. Lewis Jr.
Preceded by Maryanne Miller	Chief of Air Force Reserve and Commander of the Air Force Reserve Command; 2018–2022	Succeeded by John P. Healy
