= Tenth Air Force =

United States Air Force numbered unit

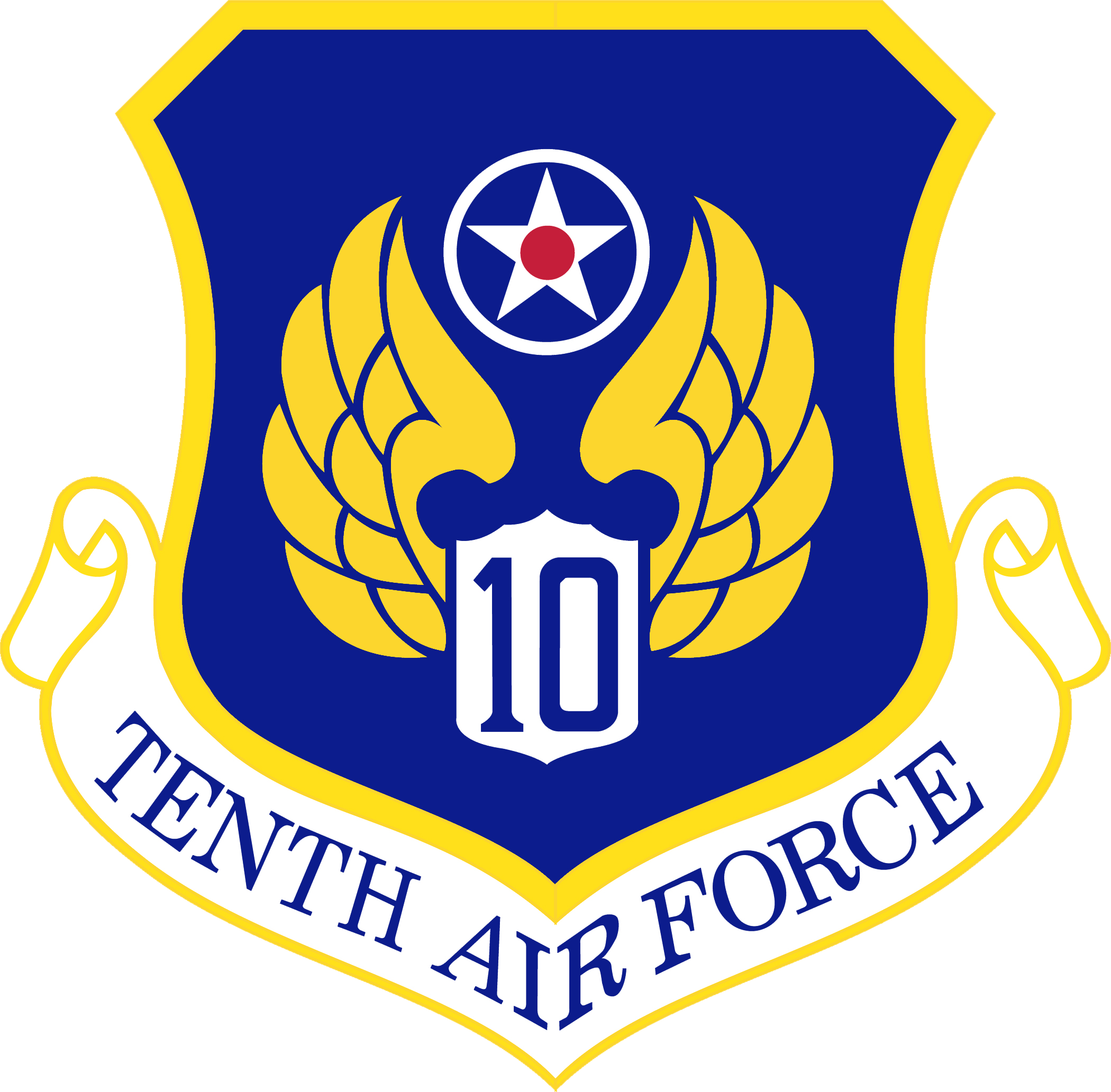
- Shield of the Tenth Air Force
- Active: 1 December 1985 – present (as Tenth Air Force); 8 October 1976 – 1 December 1985 (as Tenth Air Force (Reserve)); 20 January 1966 – 31 December 1969; 24 May 1946 – 1 September 1960; 18 September 1942 – 6 January 1946 (as Tenth Air Force); 4 February 1942 – 18 September 1942 (as 10 Air Force) (83 years, 11 months)
- Country: United States of America
- Branch: United States Air Force (18 September 1947 – present); United States Army ( Army Air Forces, 4 February 1942 – 18 September 1947)
- Type: Numbered Air Force
- Role: Provide combat-ready reserve air forces to Air Combat Command, Air Force Global Strike Command, Pacific Air Forces, Air Education and Training Command, Air Force Special Operations Command, and Air Force Space Command
- Part of: Air Force Reserve Command
- Headquarters: Carswell Air Reserve Station, Naval Air Station Joint Reserve Base Fort Worth, Texas, U.S.
- Engagements: World War II - Asiatic-Pacific Theater: Burma; India-Burma; Central Burma; China Defensive; China Offensive

- Decorations: Air Force Outstanding Unit Award

Commanders
- Commanding officer: Brig Gen Kevin J. Merrill
- Command chief: CMSgt Christopher S. Bluto Jr.
- Notable commanders: Lewis H. Brereton; Clayton L. Bissell; Howard C. Davidson

The Tenth Air Force (10 AF) is a unit of the U.S. Air Force, specifically a numbered air force of the Air Force Reserve Command (AFRC). 10 AF is headquartered at Naval Air Station Fort Worth Joint Reserve Base/Carswell Field (formerly Carswell AFB), Texas.

The command directs the activities of 14,000 Air Force Reservists and 950 civilians located at 30 military installations throughout the United States. 10 AF is the AFRC numbered air force whose units and aircraft are primarily gained by the Combat Air Forces (CAF), specifically Air Combat Command (ACC), with a smaller number also gained by Air Force Global Strike Command (AFGSC), Pacific Air Forces (PACAF), Air Force Special Operations Command (AFSOC) and Air Education and Training Command (AETC). In addition, Tenth Air Force units fly satellites for Air Force Space Command (AFSPC) in support of the Department of Defense and NOAA.

Tenth Air Force was a United States Army Air Forces combat air force created for operations in India, Burma and Indochina during World War II in the China Burma India Theater of operations. It was established at New Delhi, India, on 12 February 1942, around a nucleus of air force personnel newly arrived from Java and the Philippines, under the command of Major General (later Lieutenant General) Louis Brereton. In the years since World War II, the 10th Air Force has served both US air defense under the former Air Defense Command and Aerospace Defense Command, and reserve training and readiness programs under the cognizance of the Air Force Reserve (AFRES) and the Air Force Reserve Command (AFRC).

The 10th Air Force is commanded by Brig Gen Kevin J. Merrill.

== Overview ==
Tenth Air Force, located at Naval Air Station Fort Worth Joint Reserve Base, Texas, directs the activities of nearly 16,000 reservists and 636 civilians located at 31 military installations throughout the United States. The mission of Tenth Air Force is to exercise command supervision of its assigned Reserve units to ensure they maintain the highest combat capability to augment active forces in support of national objectives.

With approximately 60 full-time headquarters staff members, Tenth Air Force acts as the focal point for all matters pertaining to assigned Air Force Reserve units and individuals. With the assistance of 36 traditional reservists assigned, the headquarters monitors and provides assistance to all subordinate units to help resolve problem areas and more efficiently maintain unit combat readiness.

The headquarters is responsible for managing and supervising five fighter wings comprising eleven fighter squadrons and seven fighter groups; one rescue wing comprising six air rescue squadrons in two groups; one bomb wing; one airborne warning and control group; one special operations wing; one space wing comprising nine squadrons; one regional support group; and more than seventy non-flying units.

If mobilized, the flying units with custody of their own aircraft and their support elements would be gained by Air Combat Command (ACC), Air Force Special Operations Command (AFSOC), and Air Force Global Strike Command (AFGSC), with other units gained by Air Force Space Command (AFSPC), Air Education and Training Command (AETC), Air Mobility Command (AMC), United States Air Forces in Europe (USAFE) and Pacific Air Forces (PACAF). Tenth Air Force is the only Numbered Air Force that touches every Major Command in USAF with the exception of the Air Force Materiel Command (AFMC).

The flying organizations within Tenth Air Force include fighter units equipped with the F-16 Fighting Falcon and A-10 Thunderbolt II; air rescue units equipped with the HC-130 Hercules and the HH-60 Pave Hawk helicopter; a bomb wing equipped with the B-52 Stratofortress; a special operations unit equipped with the C-145A Skytruck and the U-28; fighter associate program groups embedded with active duty USAF wings and equipped with the F-22 Raptor, F-15E Strike Eagle and F-16 Fighting Falcon; an airborne warning and control associate unit equipped with the E-3 Sentry; and associate units flying MQ-1 Predator, MQ-9 Reaper and RQ-4 Global Hawk Unmanned Aerial Vehicles. The 610th Regional Support Group at NAS Fort Worth JRB is responsible for the management of twelve geographically separated units throughout the United States.

Other organizations include combat air operations, medical, civil engineer, combat logistics, communications, security forces, aerial port, intelligence and aeromedical units. Additionally, the Reserve portion of the Air National Guard/Air Force Reserve Test Center (AATC), which conducts operational test and evaluation of fighter equipment and improvements, is directly assigned to Tenth Air Force.

Reservists from 10th Air Force units are routinely deployed to Air Expeditionary units in combat areas of Central and Southwest Asia as part of the Overseas Contingency Operation.

== Units ==
Operational units of Tenth Air Force are:

- Combat Air Forces

44th Fighter Group - Tyndall AFB, Florida
301st Fighter Wing – NAS JRB Fort Worth, Texas
307th Bomb Wing – Barksdale AFB, Louisiana
414th Fighter Group – Seymour Johnson AFB, North Carolina
419th Fighter Wing – Hill AFB, Utah
442d Fighter Wing – Whiteman AFB, Missouri
477th Fighter Group – Elmendorf AFB, Alaska
482d Fighter Wing – Homestead ARB, Florida
919th Special Operations Wing – Eglin AFB Aux Field No. 3 / Duke Field, Florida
920th Rescue Wing – Patrick Space Force Base, Florida
924th Fighter Group - Davis-Monthan AFB, Arizona
926th Wing – Nellis AFB, Nevada and Creech AFB, Nevada
943d Rescue Group – Davis-Monthan AFB, Arizona
655th ISR Group - Wright-Patterson AFB, Ohio

- Regional Support Groups

610th Regional Support Group – NAS JRB Fort Worth, Texas

- Space Forces

310th Space Wing – Schriever AFB, Colorado

- Pilot Training Forces

944th Fighter Wing – Luke AFB, Arizona

- Command/Control Forces

513th Air Control Group – Tinker AFB, Oklahoma

Tenth Air Force Squadrons, Flights, and Operational Locations are also stationed at:

- Hickam Air Force Base, Hawaii
- Holloman Air Force Base, New Mexico
- Langley Air Force Base, Virginia
- March ARB, California
- Moody Air Force Base, Georgia
- Offutt Air Force Base, Nebraska
- Portland IAP / Portland Air National Guard Base, Oregon
- Sheppard Air Force Base, Texas
- Vandenberg Air Force Base, California
- Beale Air Force Base, California

== History ==
=== World War II ===
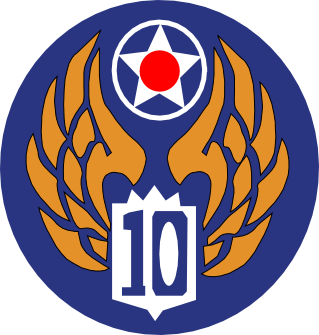
10th Air Force USAAF emblem

Tenth Air Force was constituted on 4 February 1942 and activated on 12 February, built up around a nucleus of air force personnel newly arrived from Java and the Philippines, under the command of Maj. Gen. Lewis H. Brereton. It had its headquarters at New Delhi. Components of the air force moved to India over a three-month period from March to May 1942. It was responsible for creating, operating and safeguarding the India-China Ferry, more commonly known as the Hump airlift, between 8 April and 1 December 1942, first with its Assam-Burma-China Command until 16 July, then the India-China Ferry Command until 1 December, when jurisdiction for the airlift passed to the Air Transport Command.

The Tenth Air Force initially controlled all USAAF combat operations in the China Burma India theater under theater commander Lt. Gen. Joseph Stilwell.

Under Maj. Gen. Clayton Bissell's re-organization of the Tenth Air Force, five commanders reported to him:

- Brig. Gen. Caleb V. Haynes ran the India Air Task Force, created 8 October 1942.
- Brig. Gen. Claire Chennault ran the China Air Task Force, created 4 July 1942 to replace the American Volunteer Group.
- Brig. Gen. Robert F. Tate ran the India–China Ferry Command.
- Brig. Gen. Robert C. Oliver ran the Tenth's service arm.
- Brig. Gen. Francis M. Brady operated the large air base at Karachi.

The India Air Task Force included the 7th Bombardment Group (heavy), 341st Bombardment Group (medium), and the 51st Fighter Group. On paper were more squadrons not yet prepared for war—some had no aircraft, some had too little training, and some were bare cadres.

In March 1943, the China Air Task Force was dissolved and its components made part of the new Fourteenth Air Force, activated in China under Chennault. In July 1943, Howard C. Davidson succeeded Bissell as commanding general. The Tenth operated in India and Burma as part of the Allied Eastern Air Command until it moved to China late in July 1945.

The Tenth Air Force conducted offensive strategic bombing operations in Burma and Thailand and supported Allied ground efforts with close air support and operations against Japanese communications and supply installations. After the end of the war in China, the command headquarters departed from Shanghai on 15 December 1945, being attached to Army Service Forces at Fort Lawton, Washington, where the last personnel were demobilized and the command inactivated, being returned to HQ USAAF on 6 January 1946.

=== Air Defense Command ===
In March 1946, USAAF Chief General Carl Spaatz had undertaken a major re-organization of the postwar USAAF that had included the establishment of Major Commands (MAJCOM), who would report directly to HQ United States Army Air Forces. Continental Air Forces was inactivated, and Tenth Air Force was assigned to the postwar Air Defense Command in March 1946 and subsequently to Continental Air Command (ConAC) in December 1948 being primarily concerned with air defense.

The command was re-activated on 24 May 1946 at Brooks Field (later, Brooks AFB), Texas. It moved to Offutt AFB, Nebraska, 1 July 1948; Fort Benjamin Harrison (later, Benjamin Harrison AFB), Indiana, 25 September 1948. It was originally assigned to provide air defense over a wide region from Kentucky to Montana; from the Four Corners of southwest Colorado to the Northeast tip of Minnesota, north of the borders of New Mexico, Oklahoma, Arkansas and Tennessee.

The 56th Fighter Wing at Selfridge AFB, Michigan, joined Tenth Air Force on 1 December 1948, transferring in from SAC's Fifteenth Air Force.

In addition to the command and control of the active Air Force interceptor and radar units in its region, it also became the command organization for the Air Force Reserve and state Air National Guard units. By 1949 with the establishment of the Western Air Defense Force (WADF) and Eastern Air Defense Force (EADF), the air defense mission of the command was transferred to WADF, leaving Tenth AF free to focus on its reserve training tasks.

Moved to Selfridge AFB, Michigan, 16 January 1950 where for the next decade it concentrated on air reserve training throughout the decade. On 1 July 1960, the Fifth Air Force Reserve Region was formed at Selfridge AFB. The Fifth Air Force Reserve Region was one of five Reserve regions and became operational on 1 September 1960, under the control of Continental Air Command (CAC), as a result, Tenth Air Force was discontinued, and inactivated, on 1 September 1960.

Tenth Air Force was reactivated on 20 January 1966, at Richards-Gebaur AFB, Missouri as part of Air Defense Command with the inactivation of its organization of Air Defense Sectors. Its area of responsibility was the central region of the United States east of the Rocky Mountains to the Mississippi River and the northern peninsula of Michigan.

On 16 January 1968 Air Defense Command was re-designated Aerospace Defense Command (ADCOM) as part of a restructuring of USAF air defense forces. Tenth Air Force's second period of service was short lived, however, and the command was again inactivated as the result of a major ADCOM reorganization on 31 December 1969 of the First Fourth, Tenth Air Forces and several Air Divisions. This reorganization was the result of the need to eliminate intermediate levels of command in ADCOM driven by budget reductions and a perceived lessening of the need for continental air defense against attacking Soviet aircraft.

ADCOM reassigned the units under the inactivated Tenth Air Force primarily to the 14th, 23d and 24th Air Divisions.

=== Air Force Reserve ===
Continental Air Command was discontinued on 1 August 1968, and was replaced by Headquarters Air Force Reserve, located at Robins AFB, Georgia. In July 1969, the Fourth Region moved from Randolph AFB to Ellington AFB, near Houston, Texas. On 31 December 1969, the five regions were merged into three. The responsibilities of the Fourth and Fifth Regions were consolidated into the new Central Air Force Reserve Region. Eastern Region became responsible for the First and Second Region areas, the Sixth Region became the Western Region. This change increased the area of responsibility of Central Region from five states to 14, ranging from the Canadian to the Mexican borders. As a result of these consolidations, Tenth Air Force was again inactivated on 31 December 1969.

When Air Force operations were phased out of Ellington AFB, Central Region Headquarters moved to Bergstrom AFB in Austin, Texas on 10 March 1976. The Air Force Reserve's entire intermediate management structure was then realigned effective 8 October 1976; and the Reserve Regions were inactivated and succeeded by the currently activated Tenth Air Force. Redesignated Tenth Air Force (Reserve) on 24 September 1976, the unit activated in the Reserve on 8 October 1976 at Bergstrom AFB, Texas, assigned to Air Force Reserve. It was redesignated Tenth Air Force on 1 December 1985.

As a result, the unit assumed command over all Tactical Air Command-gained and Strategic Air Command-gained Air Force Reserve units regardless of geographic location. With the inactivation of TAC and SAC in 1992, Tenth Air Force today is responsible for command supervision of fighter, bomber, rescue, airborne warning and control, special operations, flying training, combat air operations battle staff, and space reserve units.

=== Lineage ===
- Established as 10th Air Force on 4 February 1942.

Activated on 12 February 1942
Redesignated Tenth Air Force on 18 September 1942
Inactivated on 6 January 1946

- Activated on 24 May 1946

Discontinued, and inactivated, on 1 September 1960

- Activated on 20 January 1966

Organized on 1 April 1966
Inactivated on 31 December 1969

- Redesignated Tenth Air Force (Reserve) on 24 September 1976

Activated on 8 October 1976
Redesignated Tenth Air Force on 1 December 1985

=== Assignments ===
- Air Force Combat Command, 12 February 1942
- U.S. Army Forces in China-Burma-India Theater, 5 March 1942
- Army Air Forces, India-Burma Sector, 21 August 1943

Attached to Eastern Air Command, 15 December 1943 – 1 June 1945
Further attached to Strategic Air Force, Eastern Air Command, 15 December 1943 – 20 June 1944

- Army Air Forces, India-Burma Theater, 27 October 1944
- Army Air Forces, China Theater, 6 July 1945
- U.S. Army Air Forces, China Theater, 25 August 1945
- Army Service Forces, Seattle Port of Embarkation, 5–6 January 1946
- Air Defense Command, 24 May 1946
- Continental Air Command, 1 December 1948 – 1 September 1960
- Air (later, Aerospace) Defense Command, 20 January 1966 – 31 December 1969
- Air Force Reserve (later, Air Force Reserve Command), 8 October 1976 – present

=== Components ===
==== Commands ====
- IX Air Service Area: 19 March – 1 July 1948, assigned to Tenth Air Force, 19 March – 1 July 1948
- X Air Force Service Command, assigned from 1 February – 20 August 1943. Activated 1 May 1942 with headquarters at New Delhi, India. Brigadier General Elmer E. Adler was appointed commanding officer. 10 AFSC was redesignated China-Burma-India Air Service Command on 20 August 1943. 22 Air Depot Group was assigned to CBI Air Service Command from 14 February 1944 at Kharagpur, until 29 June 1944.
- XXI Air Force Service: 19 March – 1 July 1948
- Karachi American Air Base: 13 February – 20 August 1943

==== Air Divisions ====
- 30th Air Division: 16 December 1949 – 1 September 1950; 1 April 1966 – 18 September 1968
- 73d Air Division: 1 July 1948 – 27 June 1949
- 96th Air Division: 1 July 1948 – 27 June 1949
- 322d Air Division: 1 July 1948 – 27 June 1949
- 323d Air Division: 1 July 1948 – 27 June 1949.
- 20th Air Division: 1 April 1966 – 31 December 1967
- 28th Air Division: 1 April 1966 – 19 November 1969
- 29th Air Division: 1 April 1966 – 15 September 1969
- 31st Air Division: 1 July 1968 – 31 December 1969
- 24th Air Division: 19 November – 1 December 1969
- 25th Air Division: 15 September – 1 December 1969
- 26th Air Division: 19 November – 1 December 1969
- 27th Air Division: 15 September – 19 November 1969

==== District ====
- 2 Air Reserve: 1 December 1951 – 1 April 1954.

==== Regions ====
- Fourth Air Force Reserve: 1 Jul – 1 September 1960
- Fifth Air Force Reserve: 1 Jul – 1 September 1960

==== Wings and groups ====
- 552d Airborne Early Warning and Control Wing, 15 September – 15 November 1969
- 4780th Air Defense Wing (Training), 1 July 1968 – 15 November 1969
- 12th Bombardment Group, c. 21 March 1944 - c. 24 January 1945
- 341st Bombardment Group, 15 September 1942 - 3 October 1942, then resubordinated to the India Air Task Force; then reassigned back to Tenth Air Force on 16 October 1943.

=== Stations ===
- Patterson Field, Ohio 4 February 1942
- New Delhi, India, March–May 1942
- Barrackpore, India. October 1943
- Belvedere Palace, Calcutta, India, January 1944
- Kanjikoah, India, June 1944
- Myitkyina, Burma, November 1944
- Bhamo, Burma, February 1945
- Piardoba, India May 1945
- Kunming, China, June–July 1945
- Liuchow, China, August 1945
- Kunming, China, June–July 1945
- Liuchow, China, August 1945
- Kunming, China, August 1945
- Shanghai, China, October 1945
- Fort Lawton, Washington, 5–6 January 1946
- Brooks Field (later, AFB), Texas, 24 May 1946
- Offut Air Force Base, Nebraska, 1 July 1948
- Selfridge Air Force Base, Michigan, January 1950-1 September 1960
- Richards-Gebaur Air Force Base, Missouri, 1 April 1966 – 31 December 1969
- Bergstrom Air Force Base, Texas, 8 October 1976
- Carswell ARS, Texas, 30 June 1996

== List of commanders ==
No.	Commander		Term		
No.	Portrait	Name	Took office	Left office	Term length
1	Roger P. Scheer	Major General; Roger P. Scheer	1 December 1985	1 November 1986	335 days
2	William B. McDaniel	Brigadier General; William B. McDaniel	1 November 1986	6 July 1987	247 days
3	John J. Closner III	Brigadier General; John J. Closner III	6 July 1987	5 July 1989	1 year, 364 days
4	Robert A. McIntosh	Brigadier General; Robert A. McIntosh	5 July 1989	1 December 1990	1 year, 149 days
5	David R. Smith	Major General; David R. Smith	1 December 1990	February 1998	~7 years, 62 days
6	John A. Bradley	Major General; John A. Bradley	February 1998	4 March 2002	~4 years, 31 days
7	David E. Tanzi	Major General; David E. Tanzi	4 March 2002	20 January 2005	2 years, 322 days
8	Allan R. Poulin	Major General; Allan R. Poulin	20 January 2005	24 December 2005	338 days
9	Richard C. Collins	Major General; Richard C. Collins	24 December 2005	3 June 2007	1 year, 161 days
10	Thomas R. Coon	Major General; Thomas R. Coon	3 June 2007	May 2009	~1 year, 332 days
11	Frank J. Padilla	Major General; Frank J. Padilla	May 2009	5 November 2011	~2 years, 188 days
12	William B. Binger	Major General; William B. Binger	5 November 2011	18 October 2014	2 years, 347 days
13	Richard W. Scobee	Major General; Richard W. Scobee	18 October 2014	1 May 2017	~2 years, 195 days
14	Ronald B. Miller	Major General; Ronald B. Miller	1 May 2017	10 May 2019	~2 years, 9 days
15	Brian K. Borgen	Major General; Brian K. Borgen	10 May 2019	4 June 2021	2 years, 25 days
16	Bryan P. Radliff	Major General; Bryan P. Radliff	4 June 2021	4 August 2023	2 years, 61 days
17	Regina A. Sabric	Major General; Regina A. Sabric	4 August 2023	8 June 2025	1 year, 308 days
18	Kevin J. Merrill	Brigadier General; Kevin J. Merrill	8 June 2025	Incumbent	222 days

== See also ==
- Objective, Burma!
