= David R. Smith (general) =

American general

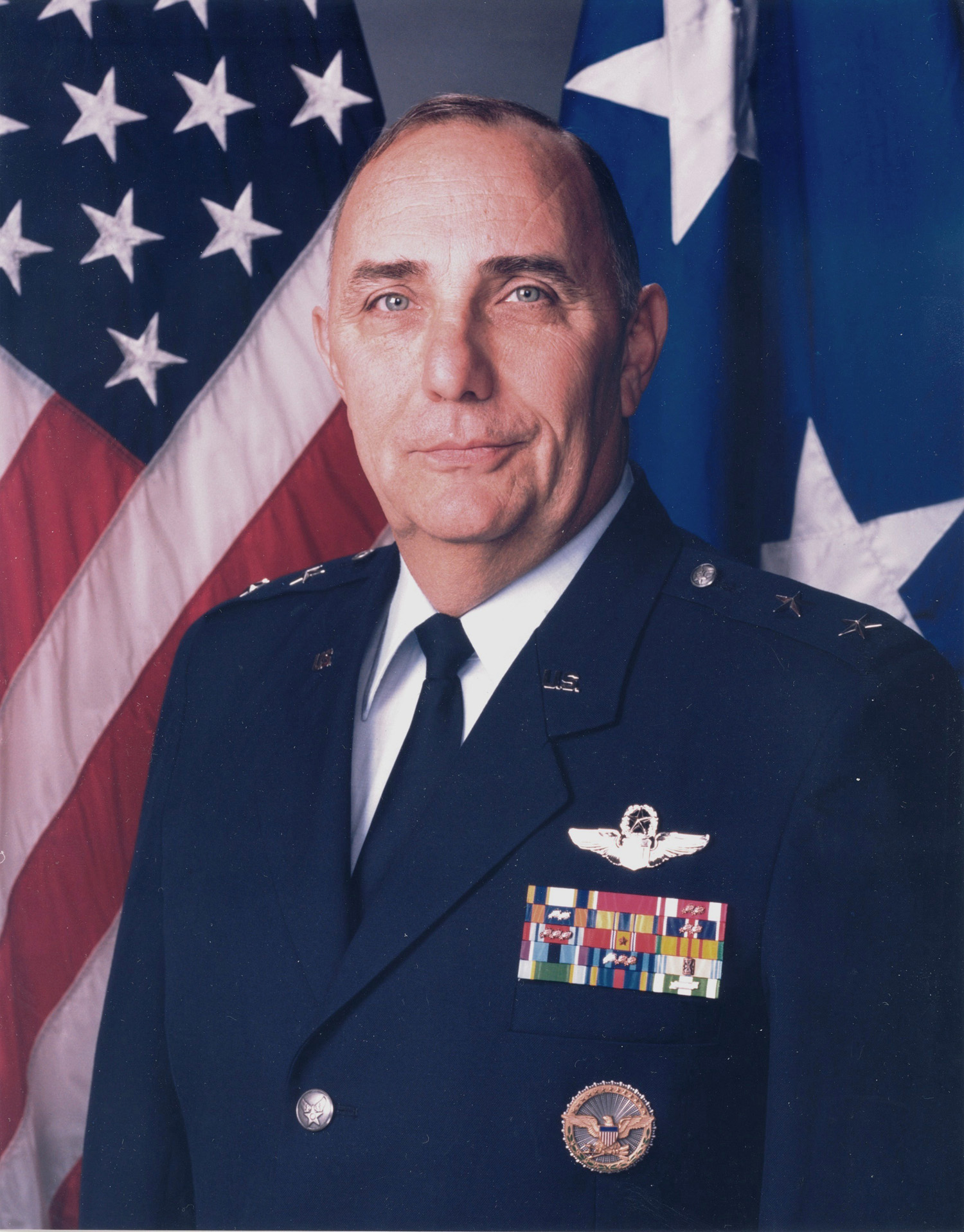
- Born: January 3, 1942 (age 84); Rochester, New York, U.S.
- Military career
- Allegiance: United States of America
- Branch: United States Air Force
- Service years: 1965–2002
- Rank: Major General
- Unit: Air Force Reserve Command

David R. Smith (born 1942) was a major general in the United States Air Force who served as Commander of the United States Air Force Reserve Command, Headquarters U.S. Air Force, Washington D.C., and commander, Headquarters Air Force Reserve, a separate operating agency located at Robins Air Force Base, Georgia. As chief of Air Force Reserve, he served as the principal adviser on Reserve matters to the Air Force Chief of Staff. As commander of AFRES, he had full responsibility for the supervision of U.S. Air Force Reserve units around the world. He was also commander of the 10th Air Force.

Smith was born in Rochester, New York. He graduated from Ithaca High School in 1959 and earned a bachelor of arts degree in business from Franklin & Marshall College in 1964. He completed the Industrial College of the Armed Forces in 1977.

In August 1965 he was commissioned as a second lieutenant through the Air Force Reserve Officer Training Corps program and received pilot wings at Craig Air Force Base, Alabama. He then was assigned to fly the RF-4C Phantom II reconnaissance fighter for the 9th Tactical Reconnaissance Squadron at Shaw Air Force Base, South Carolina. In June 1966 he was assigned to the 11th Tactical Reconnaissance Squadron, Udorn Royal Thai Air Force Base, Thailand. There he flew 100 missions over North Vietnam in the RF-4C. After completing his combat tour in January 1967, he was assigned to the 32nd Tactical Reconnaissance Squadron, Royal Air Force Station Alconbury, England. In September 1968 he returned to Craig Air Force Base's 3617th Flying Training Squadron as a T-37 instructor pilot, where he remained until his release from active duty in March 1971.

Smith joined the Air Force Reserve in June 1971 as a member of the 757th Special Operations Squadron, Youngstown Municipal Airport, Ohio, flying the A-37B Dragonfly. In June 1973 he became an Air Reserve Technician with the 917th Tactical Fighter Group, Barksdale Air Force Base, Louisiana, where he spent nine years. During that time he was the 917th Combat Crew Training School operations officer, flight management officer and commander; 47th Tactical Fighter Squadron operations officer and commander; and 917th Tactical Fighter Group deputy commander for operations.

In July 1982 Smith was assigned to the 434th Tactical Fighter Wing, Grissom Air Force Base, Indiana, as deputy commander for operations. He returned to Barksdale Air Force Base in August 1983 as commander of his former unit, the 917th Tactical Fighter Group. In August 1986 he was assigned as deputy chief of plans at Headquarters Air Force Reserve, Robins Air Force Base, Georgia. In July 1987 he became commander of the 482nd Tactical Fighter Wing, Homestead Air Force Base, Florida. He assumed his present duties in December 1990.

He is a command pilot with more than 5,000 flying hours in the RF-4C, T-37B, A-10, F-4D and F-16A/B. His military awards and decorations include the Legion of Merit, Meritorious Service Medal with two oak leaf clusters, Air Medal with 10 oak leaf clusters, and Air Force Commendation Medal.

He was promoted to major general August 12, 1992, with same date of rank. He retired on January 5, 2002.
