= John P. Healy =

U.S. Air Force general

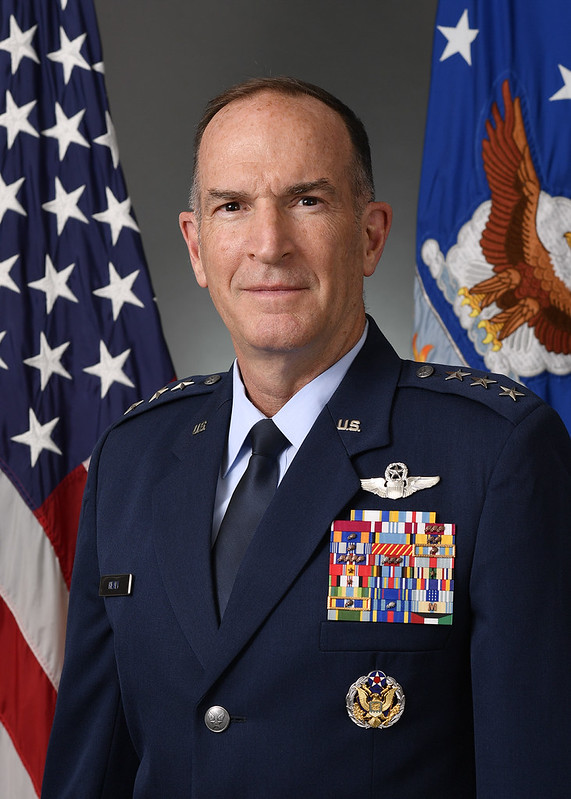
- Official portrait, 2026
- Born: 04-04-1967
- Alma mater: University of Connecticut (BA); Webster University (MA)
- Military career
- Allegiance: United States
- Branch: United States Air Force; Air Force Reserve
- Service years: 1989–present
- Rank: Lieutenant General
- Commands: Air Force Reserve Command; 22nd Air Force; 337th Airlift Squadron
- Awards: Air Force Distinguished Service Medal; Defense Superior Service Medal; Legion of Merit (3)

John P. Healy (born c. 1967) is a United States Air Force lieutenant general who serves as the chief of Air Force Reserve and commander of the Air Force Reserve Command since 3 August 2022. He served as the deputy to the chief of Air Force Reserve from July 2021 to 2 August 2022. He previously commanded the 22nd Air Force from 2019 to 2021.

Military offices
Preceded by Craig L. LaFave	Commander of the 22nd Air Force; 2019–2021	Succeeded by Bret C. Larson
Preceded by Hubert C. Hegtvedt	Deputy to the Chief of Air Force Reserve; 2021–2022	Succeeded by Matthew J. Burger
Preceded by Richard W. Scobee	Chief of Air Force Reserve and Commander of the Air Force Reserve Command; 2022–present	Incumbent
