= Air reserve component =

US reserve force

The air reserve components (ARC) are the reserve forces of the United States Air Force, consisting of the Air Force Reserve (AFR) and the Air National Guard (ANG). "ARC" is a designation used to refer to the entire reserve structure of the Air Force; it is not a command or organization in and of itself. Both the AFR and ANG have their own command structures. Together with the regular Air Force, the AFR and ANG (as well as the Civil Air Patrol, as of 2015), make up the "Air Force Total Force" concept.
