= Brian K. Borgen =

US Air Force general

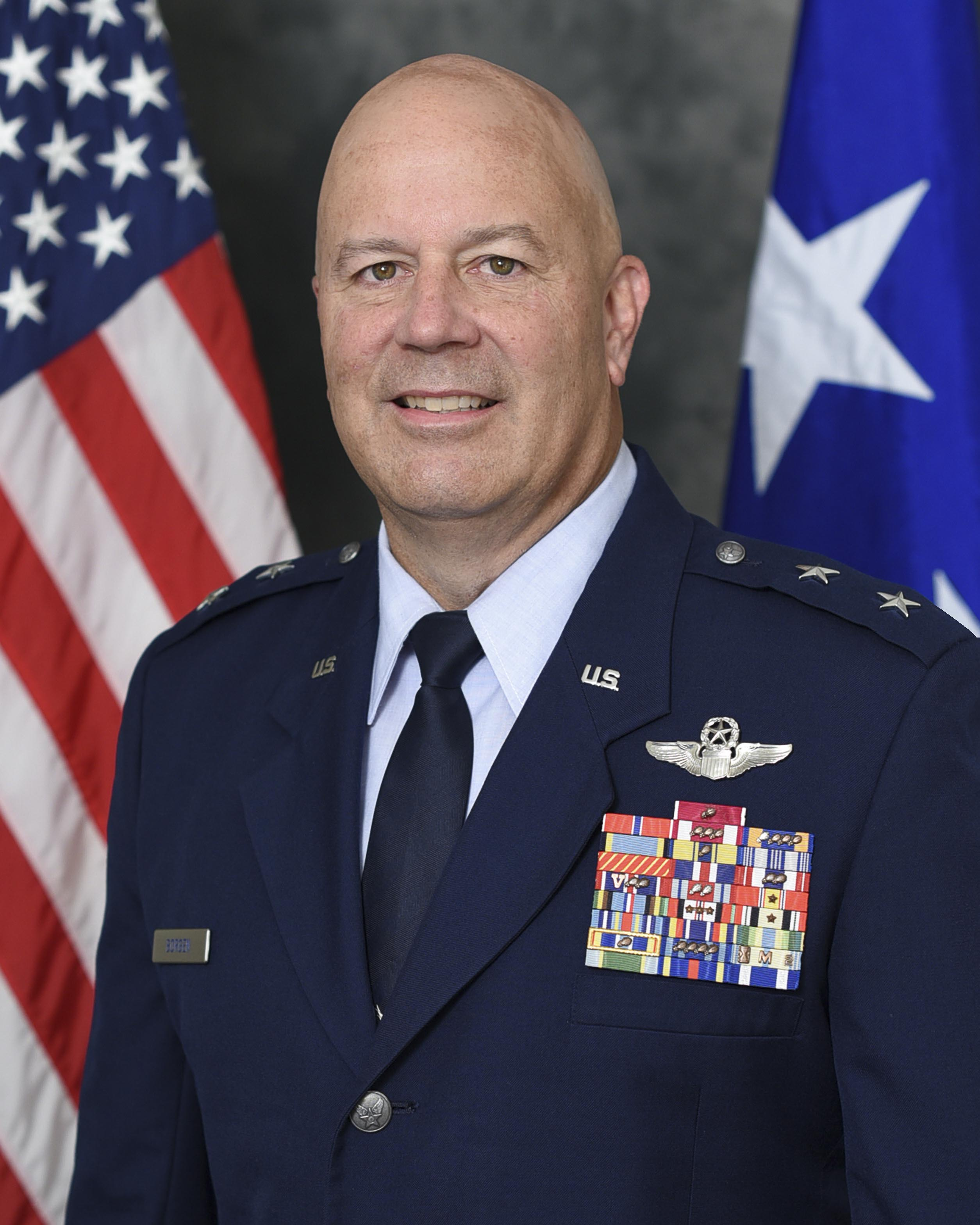
- Military career
- Allegiance: United States
- Branch: United States Air Force
- Service years: 1990–2022
- Rank: Major General
- Commands: Tenth Air Force; 442nd Fighter Wing; 455th Expeditionary Operations Group; 303rd Fighter Squadron
- Conflicts: War in Afghanistan; Iraq War
- Awards: Legion of Merit (2); Bronze Star Medal

Brian K. Borgen is a retired major general in the United States Air Force who last served as the mobilization assistant to the Deputy Chief of Staff for Operations of the United States Air Force from June 2021 to July 2022. He served as commander of the Tenth Air Force from May 2019 to June 2021.

== Air Force career ==
Brian K. Borgen graduated from Kansas State University in 1988. He joined the United States Air Force in March 1990, and attended Undergraduate Pilot Training at Williams Air Force Base. In 1995, he began flying the A-10 Thunderbolt. In May 2019, he assumed command of the Tenth Air Force.

== Dates of rank ==
Insignia	Rank	Date
	Major general	May 1, 2019
	Brigadier general	May 1, 2017
	Colonel	July 25, 2011
	Lieutenant colonel	Aug. 17, 2006
	Major	April 20. 2001
	Captain	Oct. 6, 1993
	First lieutenant	Oct. 6, 1991
	Second lieutenant	March 1, 1990
