= 419th Fighter Wing =

US Air Force Reserve unit

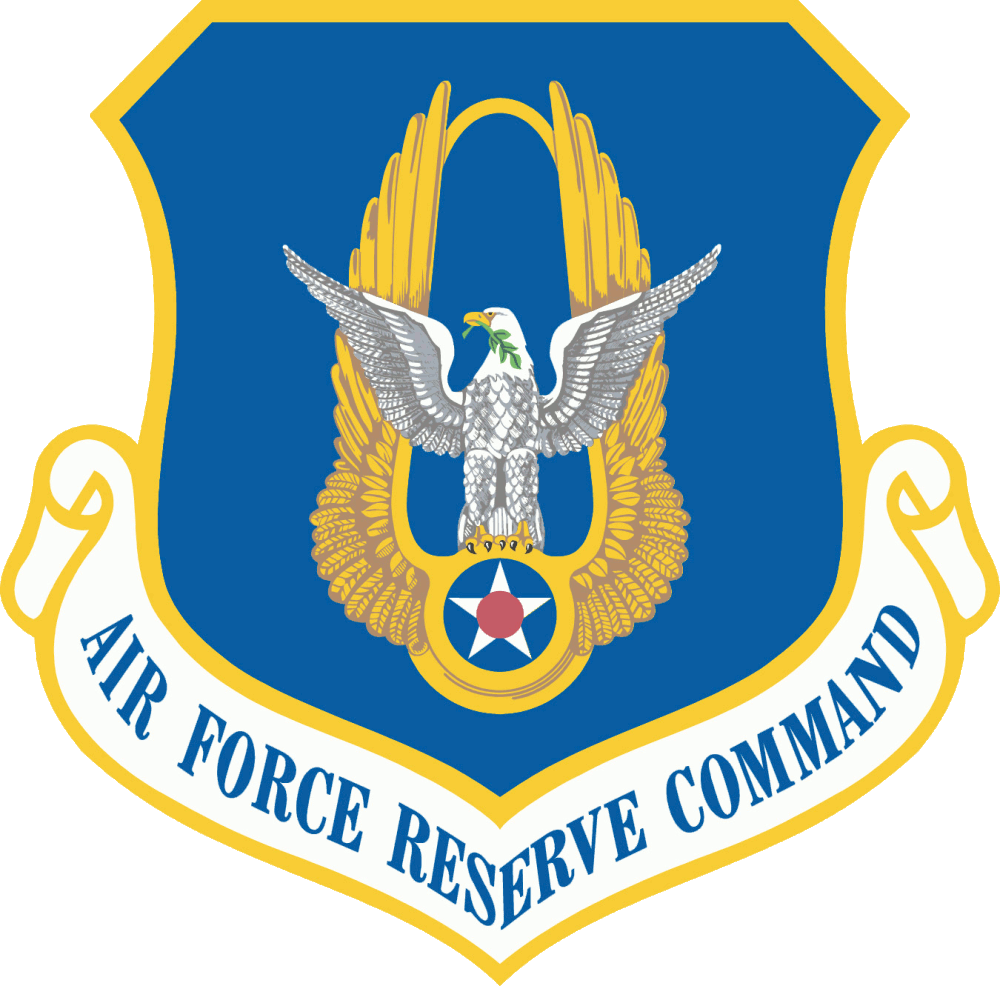
419th Fighter Wing

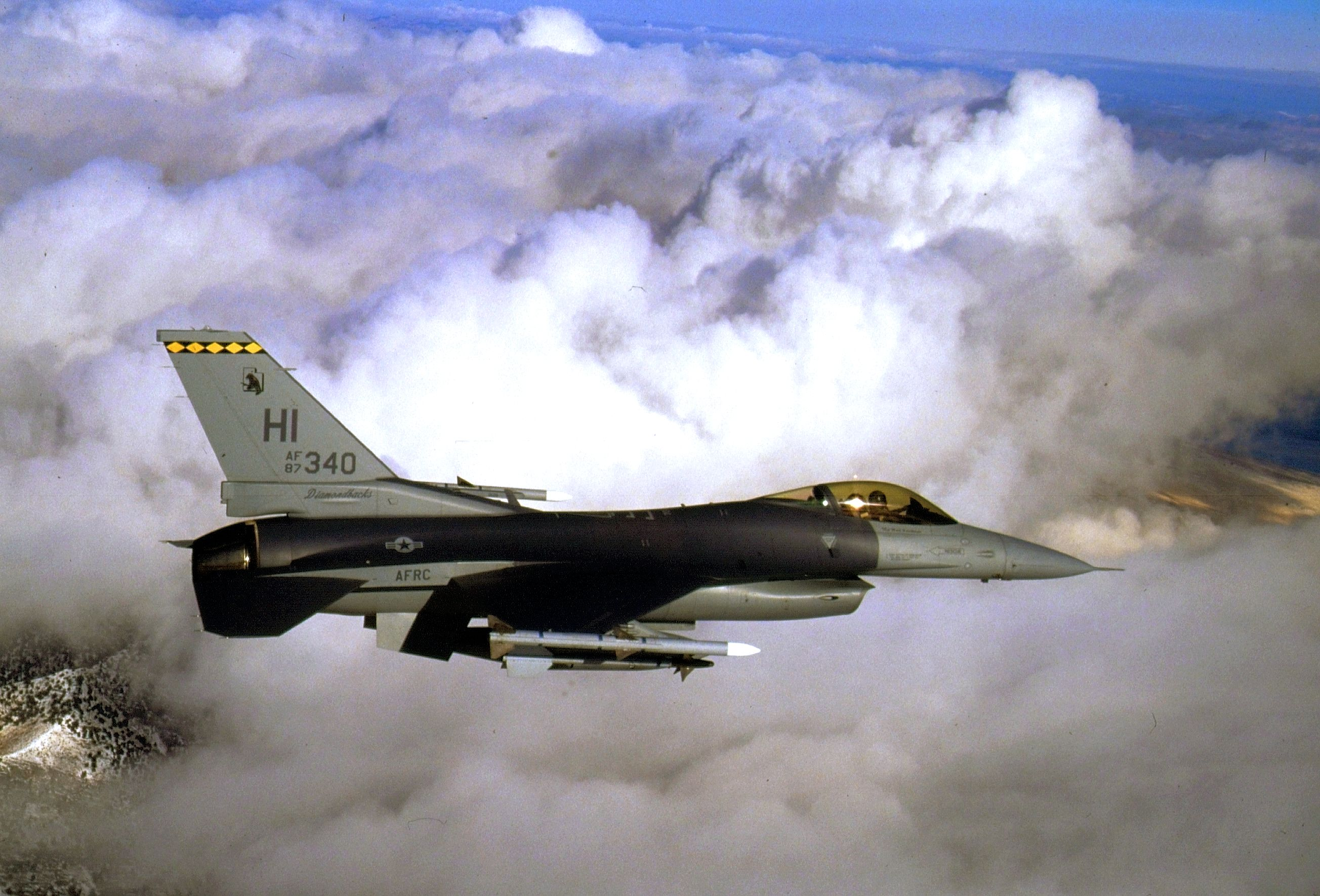
- 419th Fighter Wing F-16 Fighting Falcon (Note: Aircraft is General Dynamics F-16C Block 30J Fighting Falcon, serial 87-0340.)
- Active: 1949–1951; 1982–present
- Country: United States
- Branch: United States Air Force
- Type: Wing
- Role: Fighter
- Size: approximately 1,400 personnel
- Part of: Air Force Reserve Command
- Garrison/HQ: Hill Air Force Base, Utah
- Tail Code: Black Tail Stripe/Yellow Diamonds "HI"

Commanders
- Commander: Colonel Bradley K. Klemesrud
- Command Chief: Chief Master Sgt. Eric C. Engel

Insignia
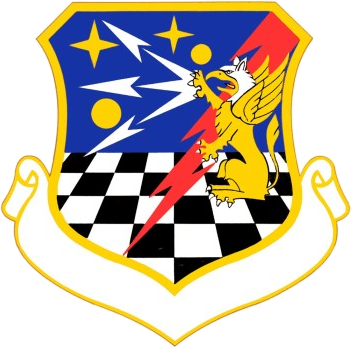
- 419th Fighter Wing emblem

Aircraft flown
- Fighter: F-35 Lightning II

The 419th Fighter Wing is an Air Reserve Component unit of the United States Air Force. It is assigned to the Tenth Air Force, Air Force Reserve Command, and is stationed at Hill Air Force Base, Utah.

The 419th is an associate unit of the 388th Fighter Wing, Air Combat Command (ACC), and if mobilized the wing is gained by ACC.

The wing trains and equips an F-16 squadron to be capable of worldwide mobility to perform a wide variety of air-to-air and air-to-ground fighter missions. Wing personnel train in a variety of specialties including operations, maintenance, civil engineering, security, supply, transportation and communications.

Wing personnel deploy periodically for contingencies and training exercises, some overseas. Some 350 members were deployed December 1994 through February 1995 to Incirlik Air Base, Turkey, to patrol the no-fly zone over northern Iraq during Operation Provide Comfort II.

In 2015, it transitioned to an Associate unit and became the first Air Force Reserve fighter wing to fly the F-35 Lightning II.

== Units ==
The 419th Fighter Wing is divided into three subordinate groups which supervise nine squadrons and four flights. Additionally, the wing oversees a medical squadron that reports directly to the commander. Several staff agencies such as plans, safety, quality, financial management, public affairs and the legal office form the wing commander's headquarters section staff.

- The 419th Operations Group plans and organizes operational programs and establishes policies and procedures for operational training functions. It directs, monitors and supports operations programs, including flight operations, standardization/evaluation, weapons and tactics, intelligence, operations and training and life support. The wing's designated flying squadron is the 466th Fighter Squadron. Pilots from the unit train for both air-to-air and air-to-ground attack missions in the F-35 Lightning II aircraft. It's currently the only combat-coded Reserve F-35 unit.
- The 419th Maintenance Group plans, organizes and establishes programs, policies and procedures in support of the unit's flying missions and contingency operations. Subordinate units include the 419th Maintenance Squadron, the 419th Aircraft Maintenance Squadron, and 419th Maintenance Operations Flight. These units train personnel, provide required resources at home and deployed locations, and maintain the wing's aircraft.
- The 419th Mission Support Group provides non-tactical support for the operational mission of the 419th Fighter Wing. It provides programs and support to the Security Forces, Communications, Civil Engineer and Mission Support Squadrons. The 419th Security Forces Squadron provides resource protection, system security and base defense missions. The 419th Civil Engineer Squadron provides pre-attack and post-attack civil engineering support necessary to maintain aircraft operations. The 419th Mission Support Flight provides administrative support for the operational mission of the wing. The 419th Logistics Readiness Squadron is responsible for managing personnel and materiel resources. The '67th Aerial Port Squadron also falls under the Mission Support Group. Its members load and unload air freight arriving from and departing for points worldwide.

== History ==
The 419th Group trained in the Reserve for troop carrier operations from 1949 to 1951.

The Air Force Reserve has maintained a flying mission at Hill Air Force Base for more than 45 years. When activated in March 1947, the 419th Group was earmarked to control seven Reserve units, the first of which was a rescue squadron.

During a two-year period, the 419th Group gained several components, spanning five separate locations and three Air Force organizations. Group pilots trained until March 1951 when training ceased and the entire 419th prepared for entry into active service. Activated in July 1956 as a component of the Regular Air Force, the group and its three squadrons trained in Fairchild C-123 Provider assault airlift operations.

Over the next several years, the wing logged missions in the Lockheed T-33 Shooting Star, Lockheed F-80 Shooting Star, Republic F-84 Thunderjet, Fairchild C-119 Flying Boxcar, Douglas C-124 Globemaster II and Curtiss C-46 Commando aircraft.

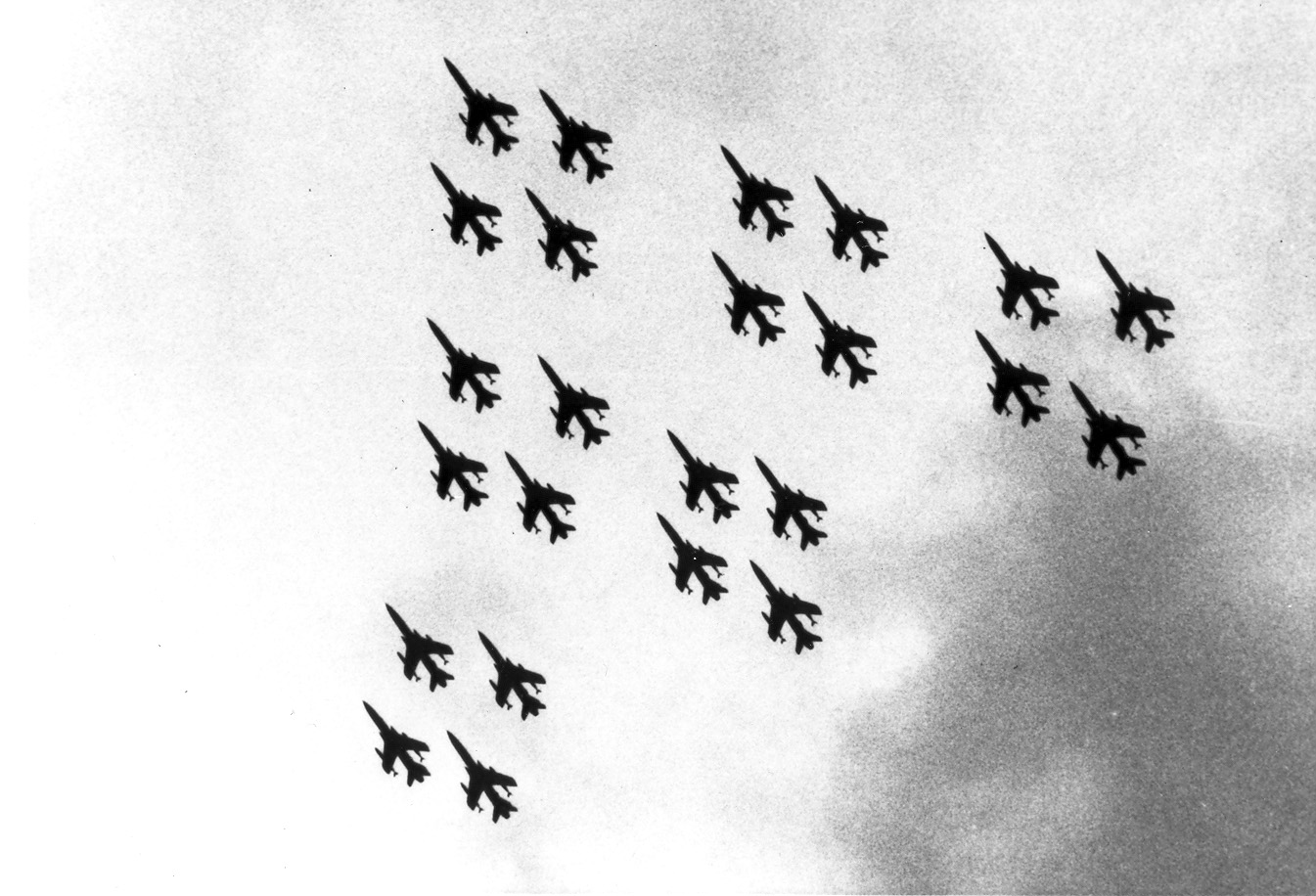
The 24-ship flyover formation, Diamonds on Diamonds, was used at the F-105 retirement at Hill Air Force Base on 4 June 1983

On 1 October 1982, the 419th Tactical Fighter Wing was activated. It was the last operational F-105 unit in the Air Force until its conversion to F-16s in January 1984.

More than one hundred 419th members were called to active duty after the Iraqi invasion of Kuwait and the Gulf War which followed (1990-91). They served in Saudi Arabia, Europe and at stateside military installations.

Approximately 350 members of the 419th Fighter Wing deployed to Incirlik Air Base, Turkey, in support of Operation Provide Comfort II from 3 December 1994 through 16 February 1995. The wing's pilots flew more than 500 sorties, compiling more than 1,400 flight hours enforcing the no-fly zone over northern Iraq.

The wing demonstrated its combat capability in a return trip to Incirlik Air Base in June 1997 to support Operation Northern Watch. The unit's show of force was significant as it deployed 12 aircraft and nearly 400 people to the region to deter the Iraqi military from terrorizing its neighbors. In 1998, the 466th Fighter Squadron deployed 6 aircraft and 93 Reservists to Kuwait in support of Operation Southern Watch.

In June 1999, the 419th Fighter Wing's deployment to Incirlik Air Base, Turkey marked the first time the Reserve supported a contingency operation by employing precision-guided munitions. After being fired upon by the Iraqi military, pilots utilized Low Altitude Targeting Infrared for Night (LANTIRN) technology to destroy enemy targets with pinpoint accuracy.

419th FW members deployed to Incirlik Air Base in June 2000 where they became the first Reserve unit ever to use the new AN/AAQ-28 Litening II FLIR technology on operations. Their F-16s equipped with the LITENING II technology, 419th pilots helped keep the Iraqi military in check flying 95 combat missions over a 28-day period.

In October 2001, the 419th returned to the Middle East as part of Air Expeditionary Force-8. Wing members used the LITENING II precision strike capability to enforce the no-fly zone over southern Iraq for 19 days.

While deployed, 419th pilots assisted in the United States' war on terrorism by logging combat missions over Afghanistan during Operation Enduring Freedom. That same month, 419th security forces members and civil engineers were mobilized and spent 18 months providing security at Air Force installations stateside and overseas.

Members of the wing's 466th Fighter Squadron supported the North American Aerospace Defense Command by flying combat air patrols (CAP) at undisclosed locations from 21 December 2001 to 1 January 2002. The wing filled each 8-hour CAP responsibility by utilizing volunteer Reservists and Air Reserve Technicians.

In January 2003, over 100 members of the 419th departed Utah to enforce the no-fly zone over southern Iraq. Once deployed, members were called to active-duty to participate in Operation Iraqi Freedom. During the war, pilots delivered precision-guided weapons on Iraqi command and control facilities, munitions bunkers, radar sites and other key military targets. Several members earned Bronze Star awards and Distinguished Flying Crosses (with heroism) for their actions.

Reservists from the 419th Medical Squadron, 419th Security Forces Squadron and 67th Aerial Port Squadron all supported contingency operations in Iraq in 2004.

=== Lineage ===
- Established as the 419th Troop Carrier Wing, Medium on 10 May 1949

Activated in the reserve on 27 June 1949
Ordered to active duty on 1 May 1951
Inactivated on 2 May 1951

- Redesignated 419th Tactical Fighter Wing on 22 February 1982

Activated in the Reserve on 1 October 1982
Redesignated 419th Fighter Wing on 1 February 1992

=== Assignments ===
- Tenth Air Force, 27 June 1949 – 2 May 1951
- Tenth Air Force, 1 October 1982 – present

=== Components ===
Groups

- 419th Troop Carrier Group (later 419th Operations Group): 27 Jun 1949 – 2 May 1951; 1 Aug 1992 – present
- 507th Tactical Fighter Group, 1 Oct 1982 – 1 Apr 1994
- 944th Tactical Fighter Group, 1 Jul 1987 – 1 Oct 1994

Squadrons

- 466th Tactical Fighter Squadron (later 466th Fighter Squadron), 1 Oct 1982 – 1 Aug 1992

=== Stations ===
- Scott Air Force Base, Illinois, 27 June 1949 – 2 May 1951
- Hill Air Force Base, Utah, 1 October 1982 – present

=== Aircraft ===
- Lockheed Martin F-35 Lightning II, (2015–present)
- General Dynamics F-16 Fighting Falcon, (1984–2017)
- Republic F-105 Thunderchief, (1972–1984)
- Curtiss C/TC-46 Commando, (1949–1951)
- North American T-6 Texan, Beechcraft AT-7 Navigator, and AT-11 Kansan, (1947–1951)

== Commanders ==
- Bradley K. Klemesrud, December 2025 – present
- Colonel Ronald J. Sloma, September 2023
- Colonel Matthew M. Fritz, June 2020 - September 2023
- Colonel Regina A. Sabric, April 2018 – June 2020
- Colonel David Smith, November 2015 – April 2018
- Colonel Bryan Radliff
- Brig Gen Gary Batnich 2004–2008
- Colonel Wayne Conroy 2002-2004
- Brigadier General Floyd C. Williams February 1999 – August 2002
- Brigadier General David E. Tanzi, 11 July 1993 – February 1999
- Brigadier General Forrest S. Winebarger, 6 July 1987
- Brigadier General John J. Closner III, 24 July 1983
- Colonel Jonathan Gardner, 1 October 1982
- Colonel Enoch O. Paulson, by Jan 1951 – c.2 May 1951
- Colonel Billy G. Dilworth Jr, 12 January 1950
- Brigadier General James H. Howard, 27 June 1949
