= Robert A. McIntosh =

United States Army general

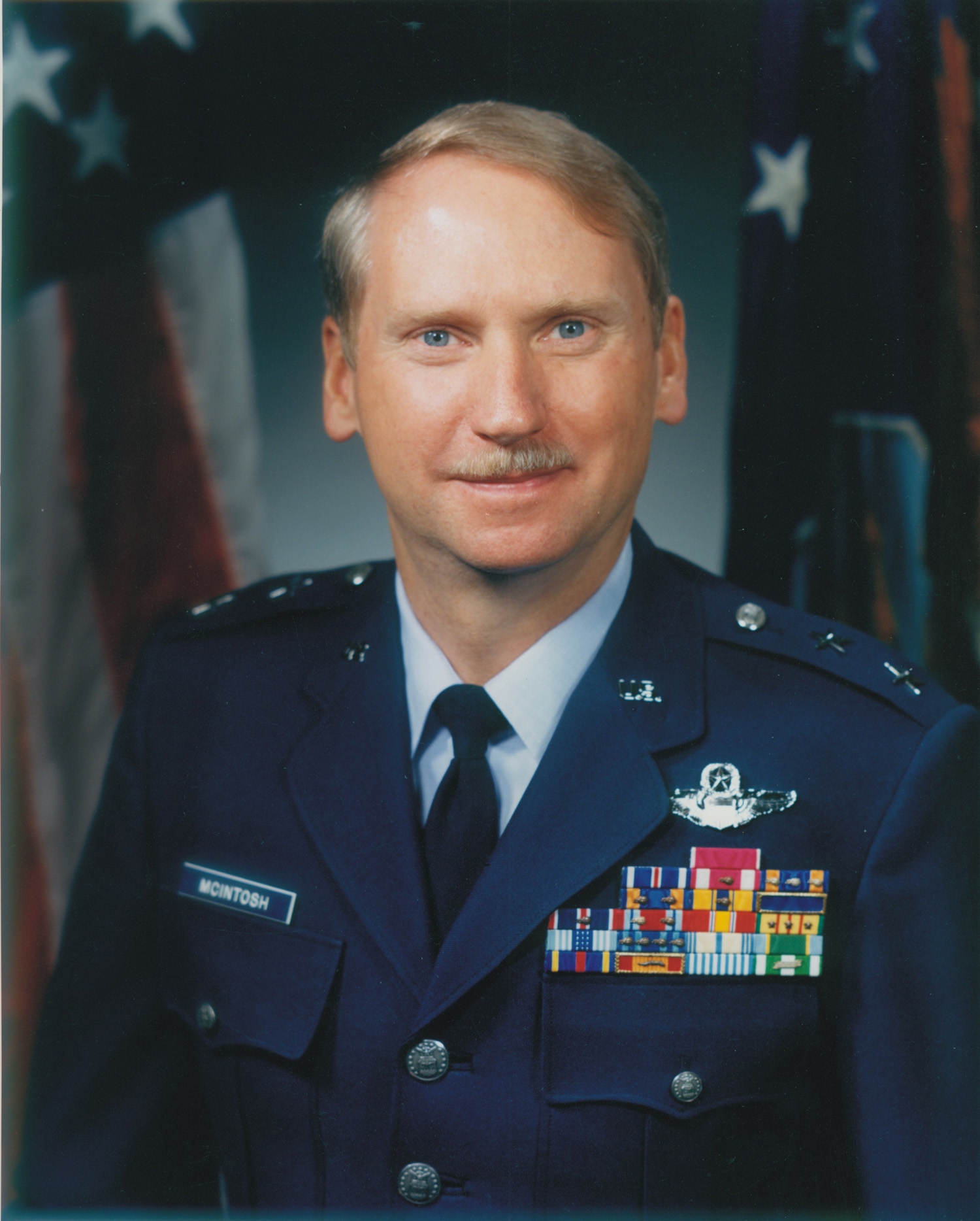
- Born: February 3, 1943 (age 83); Bellefontaine, Ohio, U.S.
- Military career
- Allegiance: United States of America
- Branch: United States Air Force
- Service years: 1966–2002
- Rank: Major General
- Awards: Distinguished Service Medal, Legion of Merit, Distinguished Flying Cross, Meritorious Service Medal with oak leaf cluster, Air Medal with 18 oak leaf clusters, Air Force Commendation Medal with oak leaf cluster, Vietnam Service Medal with three service stars, Republic of Vietnam Gallantry Cross with Palm, Republic of Vietnam Campaign Medal

Robert Alan McIntosh (born February 3, 1943) was a major general in the United States Air Force who served as Commander of the United States Air Force Reserve Command, Headquarters U.S. Air Force, Washington D.C., and commander, Headquarters Air Force Reserve, a separate operating agency located at Robins Air Force Base, Georgia. As chief of Air Force Reserve, he served as the principal adviser on Reserve matters to the Air Force Chief of Staff. As commander of AFRES, he had full responsibility for the supervision of U.S. Air Force Reserve units around the world. He served in this position from November 1994 to June 1998.

McIntosh was born in Bellefontaine, Ohio. He entered the Air Force in 1966 as a graduate of the Ohio University Reserve Officer Training Corps program, and earned a Bachelor of Science degree in business administration. He has commanded an Air Force Reserve wing, two Reserve numbered air forces and served as vice commander of the Air Force Reserve. He separated from active duty in August 1971 to join the air reserve technician program as a full-time civil service employee with active participation as an Air Force reservist. He is a command pilot with more than 4,000 flying hours in the A-10, A-37, F-4 and C-130. He was promoted to major general on August 3, 1991, and retired on December 9, 2002.

His awards include the Distinguished Service Medal, Legion of Merit, Distinguished Flying Cross, Meritorious Service Medal with oak leaf cluster, Air Medal with 18 oak leaf clusters, Air Force Commendation Medal with oak leaf cluster, Vietnam Service Medal with three service stars, Republic of Vietnam Gallantry Cross with Palm, and Republic of Vietnam Campaign Medal.

== Education ==
- 1966 Bachelor of Science degree in business administration, Ohio University
- 1977 Industrial College of the Armed Forces

== Assignments ==
- May 1966 – April 1967, student, pilot training, Webb Air Force Base, Texas
- May 1967 – January 1968, student, F-4D fighter training, Homestead Air Force Base, Florida
- February 1968 – March 1968, student, A-37 training, England Air Force Base, Louisiana
- April 1968 – March 1969, A-37 pilot, 604th Special Operations Squadron, Bien Hoa Air Base, South Vietnam
- April 1969 – August 1971, A-37 pilot, 4406th Combat Crew Training Squadron, England Air Force Base, Laouisiana
- September 1971 – October 1975, A-37 instructor pilot, 910th Tactical Fighter Group, Youngstown Municipal Airport, Ohio.
- November 1975 – January 1977, chief, standardization and evaluation, 434th Tactical Fighter Wing, Grissom Air Force Base, Indiana
- February 1977 – December 1977, operations officer, 46th Tactical Fighter Squadron, Grissom Air Force Base, Indiana
- January 1978 – December 1978, director of operations, 926th Tactical Fighter Group, Naval Air Station New Orleans, Louisiana
- January 1979 – December 1981, deputy commander for operations, 926th Tactical Fighter Group, Naval Air Station New Orleans, Louisiana
- January 1982 – December 1983, commander, 442nd Tactical Fighter Group, Richards-Gebaur Air Force Base, Missouri
- January 1984 – June 1989, vice commander and later commander, 442nd Tactical Fighter Wing, Richards-Gebaur Air Force Base, Missouri
- July 1989 – November 1990, commander, 10th Air Force, Bergstrom Air Force Base, Texas
- December 1990 – June 1993, vice commander, Headquarters Air Force Reserve, Robins Air Force Base, Georgia
- July 1993 – October 1994, commander, 22nd Air Force, Dobbins Air Force Base, Ga.
- November 1994 – June 1998, chief of Air Force Reserve and commander, Air Force Reserve Command, Washington, D.C.
