= United States Air Force Reserve =

Federal reserve forces of the United States Air Force

- Air Force Reserve Command
- Air Force Reserve Command emblem
- Active: 14 April 1948 – present (78 years, 11 months) Detailed: 17 February 1997 – present (as Air Force Reserve Command) 14 April 1948 – 17 February 1997 (as Air Force Reserve)
- Country: United States
- Branch: United States Air Force
- Type: Air reserve component (USAFR); Major command (AFRC)
- Role: "The mission of the Air Force Reserve Command is to provide combat ready forces to fly, fight and win."
- Size: 68,530 airmen 327 aircraft
- Part of: Department of the Air Force; Reserve components of the United States Armed Forces
- Headquarters: Robins Air Force Base, Georgia, U.S.
- Nickname: "Citizen Airmen"
- Equipment: List of equipment of the United States Air Force
- Decorations: Air Force Organization Excellence Award
- Website: www.afrc.af.mil www.afreserve.com

Commanders
- Commander: Lt Gen Paul R. Fast
- Deputy Commander: Maj Gen Regina A. Sabric
- Command Chief: CMSgt Israel Nuñez

Aircraft flown
- Attack: A-10C, MQ-9B
- Bomber: B-52H, B-1B
- Electronic warfare: E-3G
- Fighter: F-15C, F-15E, F-16C/D, F-22A, F-35A
- Multirole helicopter: HH-60W
- Reconnaissance: U-28A, RQ-4
- Transport: C-5M, C-17A, C-40C, C-130H, C-130J, WC-130J, C-145A, C-146A
- Tanker: HC-130J, KC-135R, KC-46

The United States Air Force Reserve (USAFR, AFR, or AFRES) is one of the United States Air Force's (USAF) two air reserve components, alongside the Air National Guard (ANG). The USAFR and ANG constitute the USAF's contribution to the reserve components of the United States Armed Forces. The USAFR represents the federal contribution to the reserve components while the ANG represents the states', certain territories', and the District of Columbia's contribution to the reserve components as the "air militia" of these entities.

The USAFR is overseen by the Air Force Reserve Command (AFRC), a major command (MAJCOM) of the USAF, with its headquarters at Robins Air Force Base, Georgia. AFRC also plays an integral role in the day-to-day Air Force mission and is not strictly a force held in reserve for possible war or contingency operations. AFRC also supports the United States Space Force through the 310th Space Wing, pending the creation of a space reserve component. The "Chief of the Air Force Reserve" is, ex officio, the commanding officer of the AFRC and is typically a lieutenant general (a three-star general officer) and reports directly to the chief of staff of the Air Force.

Together with the USAF proper, the USAFR and ANG (as well as the Civil Air Patrol, as of 2015) make up the "Air Force Total Force" concept. Per the USAF, the goal of the "Total Force" is "to develop, train, sustain, and integrate the elements of airpower to execute its functions across the spectrum of operations."

== Overview ==
The federal reserve component of the United States Air Force, AFRC has approximately 450 aircraft assigned for which it has sole control, as well as access to several hundred additional active duty USAF aircraft via AFRC "Associate" wings that are collocated with active duty Air Force wings, sharing access to those same active duty Air Force aircraft. The inventory, both AFRC-controlled and active duty Regular Air Force-controlled, includes the latest, most capable models of aircraft that are assigned to the U.S. Air Force. On any given day, 99 percent of AFRC's aircraft are mission-ready and able to deploy within 72 hours. In addition to flying units, AFRC has numerous ground organizations ranging from medical units to civil engineers, intelligence, and security forces, just to name a few.

The purpose of the Air Force Reserve, as derived from Title 10 of the United States Code (Title 10 U.S.C.), is to:

"Provide combat-ready units and individuals for active duty whenever there are not enough trained units and people in the Regular component of the Air Force to perform any national security mission."

Unlike the Air National Guard, which alternates between a "state" status and a "federal" status via both Title 32 of the United States Code (Title 32 U.S.C.) and Title 10 U.S.C., the Air Force Reserve is strictly a "federal" reserve component under Title 10 U.S.C. and operates as an independent Major Command (MAJCOM), i.e., Air Force Reserve Command (AFRC). In combination with the Air National Guard, the Air Force Reserve comprises half of what is known as the Air Reserve Component (ARC) of the United States Air Force. AFRC forces are under the administrative control (ADCON) of the Commander, Air Force Reserve Command (AFRC/CC). When activated or mobilized (e.g., under 10 U.S.C. §§ 12301(a), 12302, 12304, 12304a, or 12304b), combatant command authority (COCOM) transfers to the combatant commander to which the forces are assigned/attached and operational control (OPCON) transfers to the operational chain of command established by that commander. In addition, AFRC forces are also assigned to deployable Air Expeditionary Forces (AEFs) and are subject to deployment tasking orders along with their active duty Regular Air Force and part-time Air National Guard counterparts in their assigned deployment cycle window.

The Air Force Reserve also contains other specialized capabilities not found in regular active duty Air Force units. For example, the Air Force Reserve conducts two unique mission sets for which it possesses the sole USAF capability:

- Aerial Spray Missions
  - At the request of local, state or federal agencies, the Air Force Reserve can conduct aerial spray missions employing insecticides or herbicides with specially-equipped C-130 aircraft.
- Hurricane and Weather Reconnaissance
  - The Air Force Reserve maintains the Air Force's sole aerial weather reconnaissance capability, to include hurricane and typhoon penetration by its own WC-130J aircraft, augmenting the National Oceanographic and Atmospheric Administration (NOAA) WP-3D aircraft fleet.

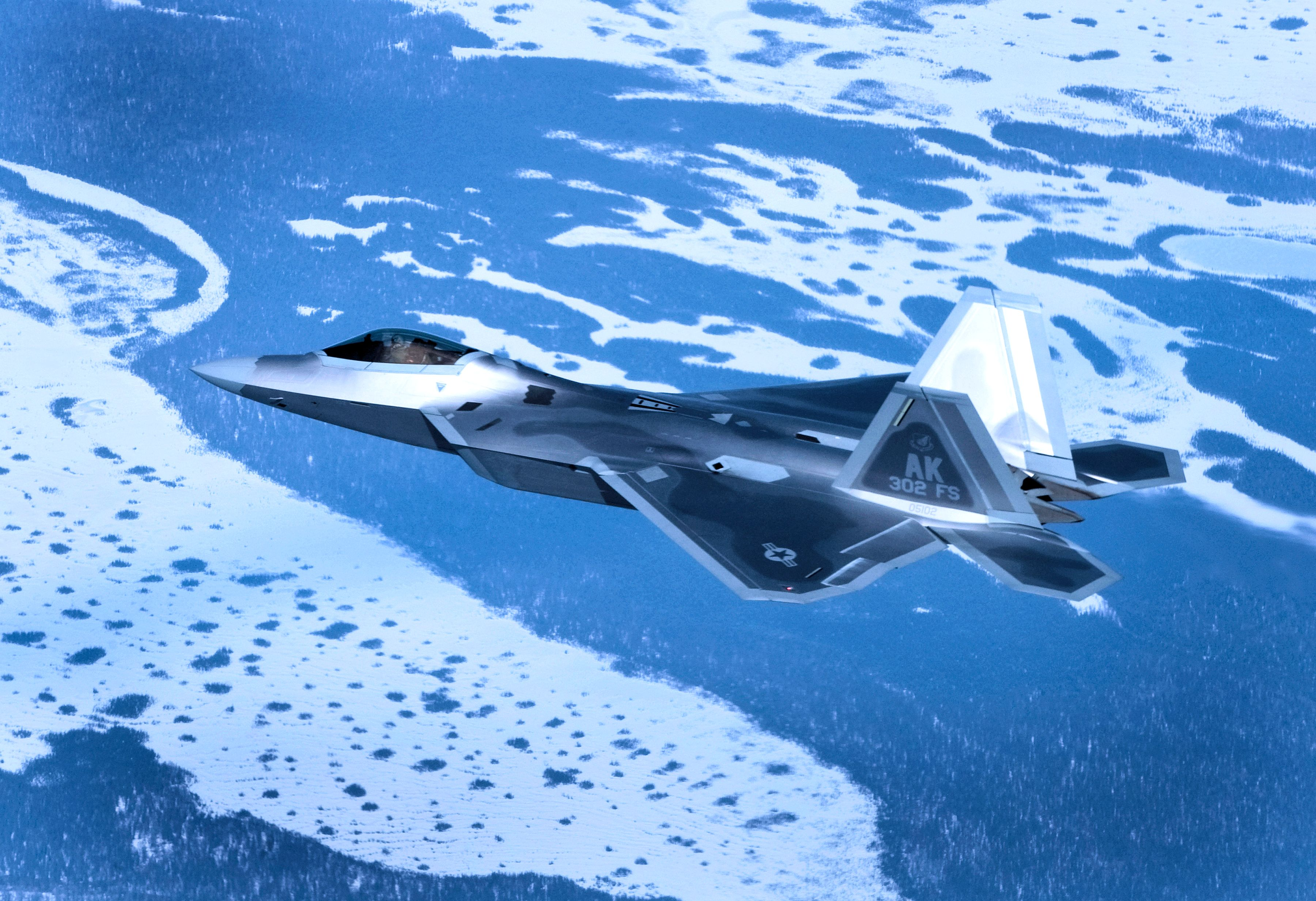
F-22 Raptor of the 477th Fighter Group over Anchorage, Alaska in 2008.

A third unique mission set in the Air Force Reserve, Aerial Firefighting, is conducted in tandem with the Air National Guard and also has no counterpart in the Regular Air Force. Certain units of the Air Force Reserve and Air National Guard can conduct forest fire and wildfire suppression missions using specially equipped C-130 Hercules aircraft using the palletized Modular Airborne FireFighting System (MAFFS).

Along with its Regular Air Force and Air National Guard partners, the Air Force Reserve also participates in national and international humanitarian assistance and disaster relief (HA/DR) missions as directed by higher authority.

Like their Air National Guard counterparts, the Air Force Reserve also supports counter-narcotics (CN) operations by performing detection and interdiction efforts outside the United States in coordination with the U.S. Coast Guard and other agencies.

== Reserve categories ==
There are several categories of service for personnel in the Air Force Reserve. Most Air Force Reservists are part-time Traditional Reservists (TR) who serve in the Unit Program, in which they are required to report for duty with their parent Air Force Reserve Command unit, typically a wing, group or squadron, at least one weekend a month and an additional two weeks a year (e.g., 38 days). However, many Air Force Reservists, especially those in an active flying status, serve well in excess of this minimum duty requirement, often in excess of 120-man-days a year.

A smaller but equally important category of TR is the Individual Mobilization Augmentee (IMA). IMAs are part-time Air Force Reservists who are assigned to active duty Air Force units and organizations, combat support agencies, Unified Combatant Commands and the Joint Staff to do jobs that are essential in wartime or during contingency operations, but do not require full-time manning during times of peace. They report for duty a minimum of two days a month and twelve additional days a year, but like their Unit Program counterparts, many IMAs serve well in excess of the minimum military duty requirement, providing multiple weeks or months of active duty "man-days" in support of active duty USAF and joint commands.

A smaller number of Reservists serve limited tours of extended active duty in an Active Duty Special Work (ADSW) status, usually at an Air Force headquarters staff level, in the joint combatant commands, or in other special assignments. Their job is to bring Air Force Reserve expertise to the planning and decision-making processes at senior levels within the Air Force, other services, and the Unified Combatant Commands.

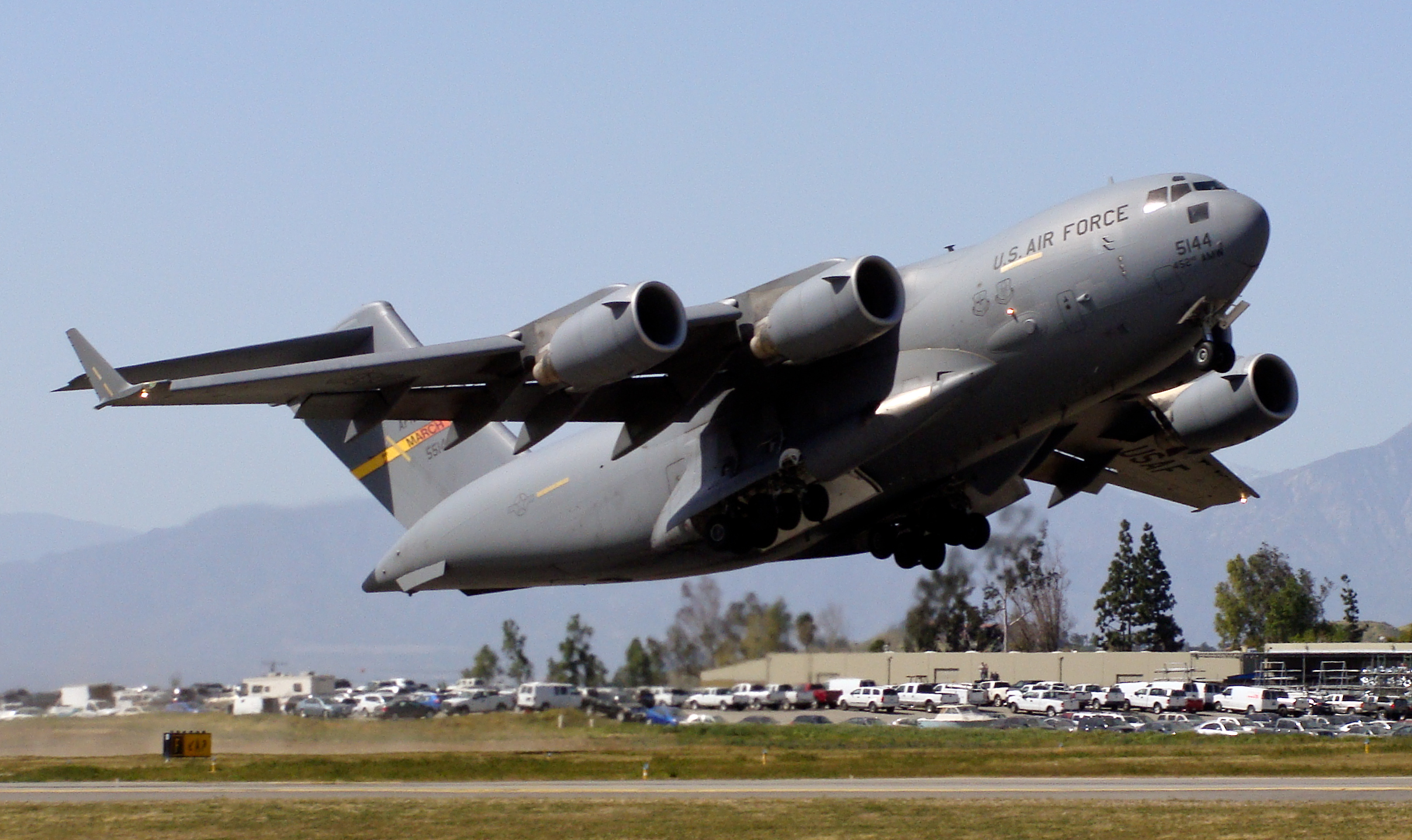
C-17 Globemaster III of the 452nd Air Mobility Wing from March Air Reserve Base in 2010.

Like the Air National Guard, the Air Force Reserve Command also requires two categories of full-time personnel to perform functions that require full-time manning. These full-time positions are filled via the same two programs as employed by the Air National Guard: the Active Guard and Reserve (AGR) program and the Air Reserve Technician (ART) program. Air Force Reservists who become members of the Active Guard and Reserve (AGR) receive full active duty pay and benefits just like active duty members of any branch of the armed forces. The majority of AGRs are former TRs and they serve four-year controlled tours of special duty that can be renewed. Many AGRs serve with operational AFRC flying and non-flying wings and groups; at active and reserve numbered air forces; on the staffs of other USAF Major Commands (MAJCOMs), Field Operating Agencies (FOAs) and Direct Reporting Units (DRUs); on the Air Staff at Headquarters, U.S. Air Force (HAF); on the staffs of Unified Combatant Commands; on the Joint Staff and in the Office of the Secretary of Defense (OSD). AFRC Recruiting is another field that employs AGR personnel. AGRs also have the option with good performance to serve 20 or more years on active duty and receive a retirement after 20 or more years, just like active members of the Regular Air Force.

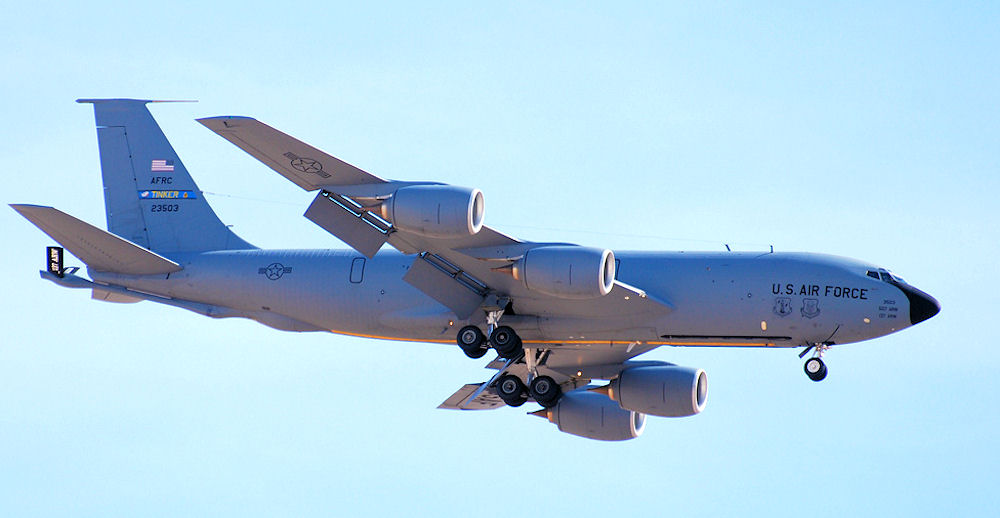
KC-135R Stratotanker of the 465th Air Refueling Squadron.

Another category of Air Force Reservists serving full-time are those in the Air Reserve Technician Program (ART). ARTs are accessed from either the active duty Regular Air Force, the AGR program, Traditional Guardsmen (TG) in the Air National Guard, or TRs in the Air Force Reserve. ARTs carry a dual status, working for the Air Force as both full-time civil service employees and as uniformed military members in the same AFRC units where they work as Department of the Air Force Civilians (DAFC), performing the same job duties. Although "technically" civil servants part of the time, all ART officers must maintain a reserve commission on the Reserve Active Status List (RASL) as a TR and all ART enlisted personnel must maintain a current reserve enlistment as a TR as a precondition for both hiring and continued career employment as an ART. In addition, all ART officers and ART enlisted personnel wear their uniforms and utilize their rank titles at all times when on duty, regardless if they are in a DAFC status or in a drilling or active duty military status. Most ART personnel are assigned to operational AFRC flying wings, groups and squadrons in various operational flying, aircraft maintenance and other support positions and functions, up to and including wing commander. Because ARTs are not eligible for DAFC retirement until reaching age 60, and because a condition of their employment as an ART is contingent upon their maintaining an active reserve military status until reaching age 60, ARTs are not subject to the same maximum years of service limitations by pay grade that impact non-ART personnel. As such, ART personnel are permitted to remain in uniform until age 60, typically past a point that would otherwise require their retirement from military service based on rank, pay grade and years of service.

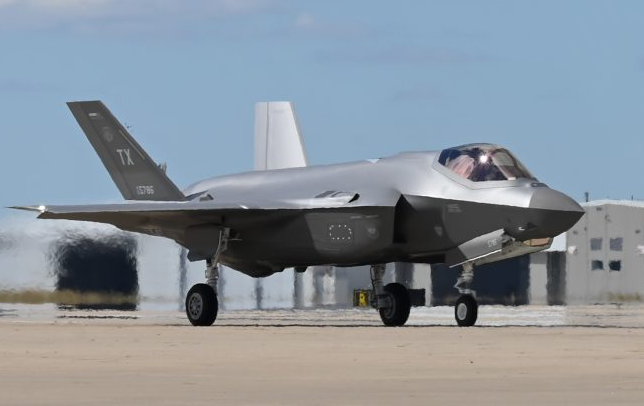
F-35A Lightning II of the 301st Fighter Wing taxis at Naval Air Station Joint Reserve Base Fort Worth, Texas, in 2024.

Traditional Reservists (TR) are categorized by several criteria in either the Ready Reserve, Standby Reserve, Individual Ready Reserve or Retired Reserve:

- Ready Reserve

Approximately 74,000 trained personnel who may be recalled to Active Duty to augment active forces in time of war, contingency operations, or other national emergency. This category also includes all full-time ART personnel. They are predominantly assigned to the Unit Program or as IMAs.

- Standby Reserve

Includes Reservists whose civilian jobs are considered key to national defense or who have temporary disability or personal hardship. Most do not train, are not assigned to units and are typically not eligible for promotion/advancement.

- Individual Ready Reserve (IRR)

Comprises members who no longer train with combat ready Reserve units, but are qualified in their fields and eligible to be recalled in the event of a national emergency.
There is a small group labeled as Participating IRR (PIRR) who receive points toward military retirement, but not drill pay or Annual Training with pay and are under what the Air Force Reserve (and Air National Guard) designates as Category E (CAT E) status. Some PIRR members continue to participate with existing Air Force organizations in a non-pay status or in Unified Combatant Commands where they may be eligible to perform Active Duty for Training (ADT), Active Duty for Operational Support (ADOS), Active Duty Special Work (ADSW) ... also known as "mandays" ... or voluntary Mobilization to Active Duty (MOB) with full pay and allowances. CAT E Air Force Reservists also include some 1,000 USAF Academy Liaison Officers (ALOs), Civil Air Patrol Reserve Liaison Officers (RLOs), chaplains, and a few other positions that require military duty, but not a fixed schedule. These CAT E personnel can also earn active duty mandays with pay just like CAT A and B reservists, but on a more limited basis.

- Retired Reserve

The Retired Reserve is made up of retired personnel who receive pay after retiring from Active Duty or a Reserve Component, or are Reservists awaiting retirement pay at age 60. Some exceptions are made for certain Reservists mobilized to Active Duty since 11 September 2001 who may receive retirement pay earlier on a sliding scale between ages 50 and 60. Eligibility for TRICARE Prime or TRICARE Standard medical coverage for retirees and their families is delayed until the retiree reaches age 60.

== Associate Program ==
A USAF Associate Unit is a unit where active duty, Air Force Reserve and Air National Guard members combine forces and missions using "Total Force" concept integration. The Air Force Reserve Command Associate Program provides trained crews and maintenance personnel for active-duty owned aircraft. This unique program pairs a Reserve unit with an active-duty unit to share a single set of aircraft and rests on the idea that there are more operational requirements than there are manpower to fulfill them. The Associate Reserve program is based on providing manpower to complement the Total Force.

Previously, an associate unit was one where the active duty (typically a wing level organization) owned the aircraft and the Air Force Reserve or Air National Guard wing or group co-located with the active duty unit, providing only manpower. To take advantage of the synergies and aircraft, active duty units are now being stood up at what were previously Air Force Reserve Command or Air National Guard locations, where the Air Reserve Component organization technically "owns" the aircraft, but share them with an active duty squadron, group or wing that provides additional manning. This enables the Air Force to be more productive in meeting the global demands for primarily the Mobility Air Forces (MAF), the Air Force's cargo and aerial refueling aircraft, although the concept is now being extended to the Combat Air Forces (CAF), the Air Force's fighter, bomber, reconnaissance, rescue and special operations aircraft, as well. The result is a more cost-effective way to meet increasing mission requirements.

- In an active associate unit, the Air Force Reserve or Air National Guard owns the aircraft, while the active duty Regular Air Force embeds a squadron, group or wing that provides air crews, aircraft maintenance and support personnel who share the responsibility of flying and maintaining the AFRC or ANG aircraft.
- In a traditional associate unit, Air Force Reservists fly and maintain aircraft owned by the active duty Regular Air Force. In many of these units, particularly in the MAF, the aircraft have been re-marked to include both Regular Air Force and Air Force Reserve Command or Air National Guard organizational and unit markings.
- A corollary unit is an Air Force Reserve or Air National Guard squadron or group attached to an active duty squadron or group.

Associate unit reservists are most heavily concentrated in the Air Mobility Command (AMC) and fly AMC's largest airlifters, the C-5 Galaxy, and the newest AMC global airlifter, the C-17 Globemaster III, with Air Force Reserve associate crews accounting for nearly 50 percent of the Air Force's total C-5 and C-17 air crew capability. AFRC also provides sole Formal Training Unit (FTU) functions in the C-5 for the Regular Air Force, the Air Force Reserve, and prior to the C-5's retirement from that component, the Air National Guard.

AFRC also provides aerial refueling capability with aircrews operating AMC KC-46s in associate units and KC-135 Stratotankers in both associate and Air Reserve Component air mobility wings, air refueling wings, and air refueling groups. Air Force Reservists also contribute about 13 percent of total KC-135 aerial refueling requirements.

In another alignment with AMC, more than 9,100 Air Force Reservists train in the C-130 Hercules theater airlift mission in a variety of aircrew, aircraft maintenance and support skills as both stand alone AFRC units and in "Associate" arrangements with Regular Air Force and Air National Guard C-130 units. In wartime, AFRC provides 23 percent of Air Force's total C-130 theater airlift force, with nearly half of the Air Force Reserve's airlift units flying their own unit-assigned C-130 Hercules aircraft, several of which have now integrated Active Associate units from the Regular Air Force. The C-130's speed, range, load-carrying characteristics and capability to operate under difficult terrain conditions make it a versatile aircraft, strong enough to deliver its cargo on unimproved landing strips.

Other AMC-aligned AFRC missions involve aeromedical evacuation and special air support operations.

Air Combat Command (ACC) F-22A Raptor air dominance fighters, F-16 Fighting Falcon and F-15E Strike Eagle multipurpose fighters, A-10 Thunderbolt II ground attack aircraft, MQ-9B remotely-piloted aircraft are jointly operated by ACC active duty personnel and AFRC aircrews via Associate units.

Several AFRC Air Operations Centers (AOCs) also operate as stand alone units or in associate augmentation to ACC, AMC, Pacific Air Forces (PACAF), U.S. Air Forces in Europe (USAFE) and U.S. Air Forces Central (AFCENT) AOCs operating the AN/USQ-163 Falconer AOC weapons system.

In associate programs with the Air Education and Training Command (AETC), AFRC support undergraduate pilot training by providing instructor pilots in the T-6 Texan II, T-38 Talon and T-1 Jayhawk.

AFRC Space Operations associate units aligned with the United States Space Force also operate Defense Meteorological Satellite Program (DMSP), Defense Support Program (DSP) and Global Positioning System (GPS) Satellites as well as various cyber warfare systems.

== Unit Program with AFRC-owned Aircraft ==
AFRC also operates numerous F-16 and A-10 aircraft in stand-alone AFRC fighter wings that are operationally aligned with the Air Combat Command (ACC). AFRC's HC-130 and HH-60 combat search and rescue (CSAR) aircraft are also assigned to stand-alone flying units that are operationally aligned with ACC. A single AFRC bomb wing is equipped with the B-52 and is operationally aligned with Air Force Global Strike Command (AFGSC).

AFRC also operates stand-alone C-5, C-17, C-130, C-40, KC-46 and KC-135 units that are operated by the Air Mobility Command (AMC). The Air Force Reserve also operates the WC-130 Hurricane Hunter in the weather reconnaissance mission and provides the sole USAF capability for this mission set.

In tandem with Air Force Special Operations Command (AFSOC), AFRC previously operated the MC-130E Combat Talon I aircraft until its retirement in 2013. AFRC's sole special operations wing currently operates the C-146A Wolfhound, C-145A Skytruck, and U-28A, providing Formal Training Unit (FTU) functions for both the active duty Air Force and the Air Force Reserve on those aircraft. The 919 SOW also operates the MQ-9 Reaper remotely piloted aircraft (RPA) in the attack and intelligence, surveillance and reconnaissance (ISR) roles.

== Units ==
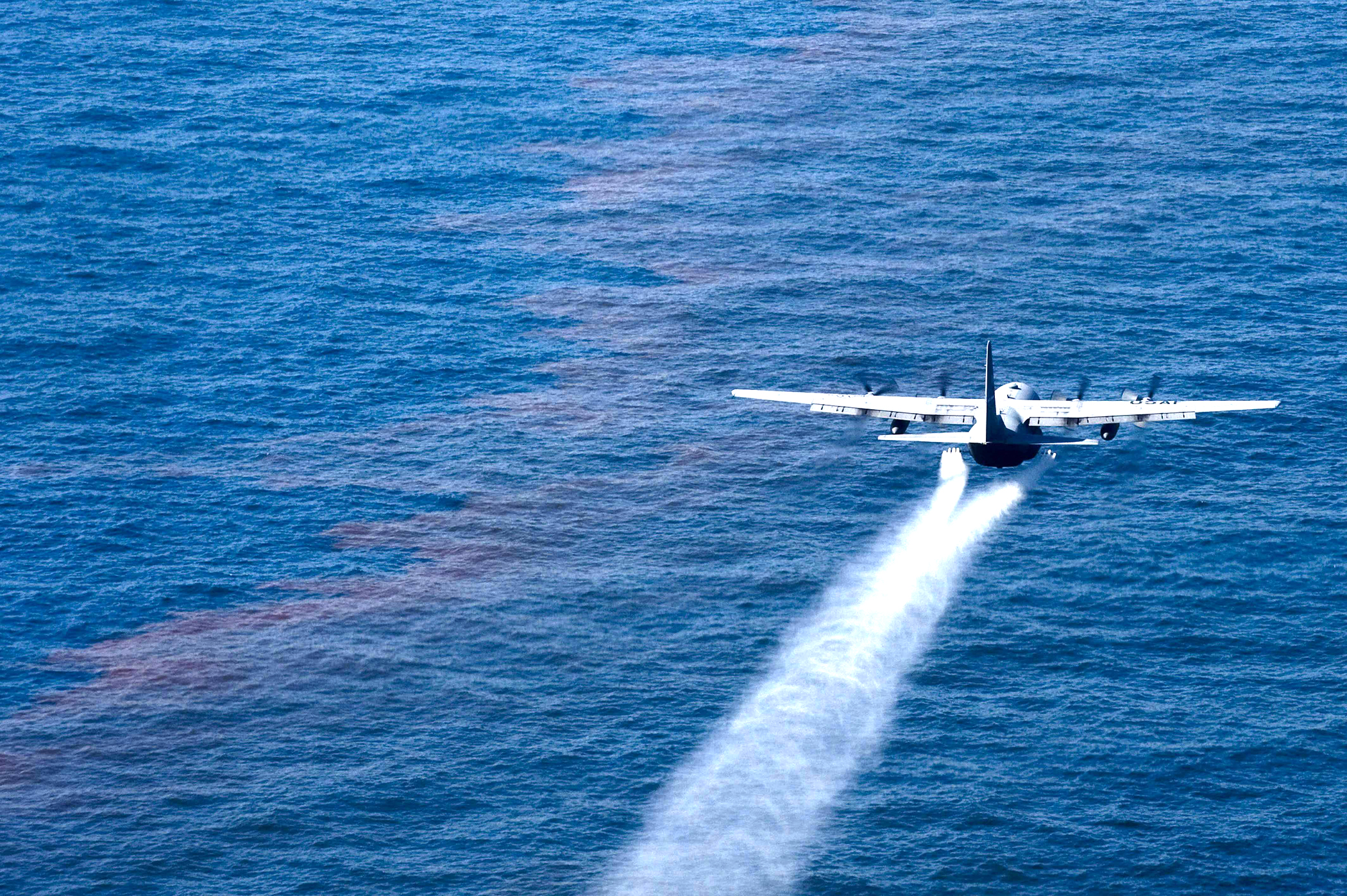
C-130 Hercules of the 910th Airlift Wing drops an oil-dispersing chemical into the Gulf of Mexico as part of the Deepwater Horizon response effort in 2010.

Nearly 70,000 reservists are assigned to specific Air Force Reserve units. These are the people who are obligated to report for duty for a minimum one weekend each month and two weeks of annual training a year, with most performing many additional days of military duty. Reserve aircrews, for example, average more than 120 military duty days a year, often flying in support of national objectives at home and around the world. Air Reserve Technicians (ARTs), the special group of reservists who work as Air Force civil service employees during the week in the same jobs they hold as reservists on drill weekends and active duty periods, provide a degree of continuity that serves to make the Air Force Reserve a relevant combat force. ARTs are the full-time backbone of the unit training program, providing day-to-day leadership, administrative and logistical support, and operational continuity for their units. More than 9,500 reservists, over 15 percent of the force, serve full-time as ARTs.

Air Force Reserve Command consists of three Numbered Air Forces:

Fourth Air Force (4 AF)
March Air Reserve Base, California

- 315th Airlift Wing (C-17A)

Associate unit with 437th Airlift Wing
Joint Base Charleston, South Carolina

- 349th Air Mobility Wing (C-5M, C-17A, KC-46A)

Associate unit with 60th Air Mobility Wing
Travis Air Force Base, California

- 433d Airlift Wing (C-5M)

Lackland AFB / Kelly Field Annex, Joint Base San Antonio, Texas
Includes C-5 Formal Training Unit (FTU) mission under AETC

- 434th Air Refueling Wing (KC-135R)

Grissom Air Reserve Base, Indiana

- 445th Airlift Wing (C-17A)

Wright-Patterson Air Force Base, Ohio

- 446th Airlift Wing (C-17A)

Associate unit with 62d Airlift Wing
McChord AFB, Joint Base Lewis-McChord, Washington

- 452d Air Mobility Wing (C-17A, KC-135R)

March Air Reserve Base, California
1 of 2 air refueling sqdns is an Active Associate unit with the 92d Air Refueling Wing
Fairchild Air Force Base, Washington.

- 439th Airlift Wing (C-5M)

Westover Air Reserve Base, Massachusetts

- 459th Air Refueling Wing (KC-135R)

Andrews AFB, Joint Base Andrews, Maryland

- 507th Air Refueling Wing (KC-135R)

Tinker Air Force Base, Oklahoma

- 512th Airlift Wing (C-5M, C-17A)

Associate unit with 436th Airlift Wing
Dover Air Force Base, Delaware

- 514th Air Mobility Wing (C-17A, KC-46A)

Associate unit with 305th Air Mobility Wing
McGuire Air Force Base, Joint Base McGuire-Dix-Lakehurst, New Jersey

- 624th Regional Support Group (PACAF)

Hickam AFB, Joint Base Pearl Harbor–Hickam, Hawaii

- 911th Airlift Wing (C-17A)

Pittsburgh IAP Air Reserve Station, Pennsylvania

- 914th Air Refueling Wing (KC-135R)

Niagara Falls Air Reserve Station, New York

- 916th Air Refueling Wing (KC-46A)

Seymour Johnson Air Force Base, North Carolina
1 of 2 air refueling sqdns is an Active Associate unit with the 6th Air Refueling Wing
MacDill Air Force Base, Florida.

- 927th Air Refueling Wing (KC-135R/T)

Associate unit with 6th Air Mobility Wing
MacDill Air Force Base, Florida

- 931st Air Refueling Wing (KC-135R/T, KC-46A)

Associate unit with 22d Air Refueling Wing
McConnell Air Force Base, Kansas

- 940th Air Refueling Wing (KC-135R)

Beale Air Force Base, California

Tenth Air Force (10 AF)
Naval Air Station Fort Worth Joint Reserve Base/Carswell Field, Texas

- 44th Fighter Group (F-22A)

Associate Unit with the 325th Fighter Wing
Tyndall Air Force Base, Florida
Geographically Separated Unit (GSU) of 301st Fighter Wing, NAS JRB Fort Worth, Texas

- 301st Fighter Wing (F-35A)

Carswell Field, Naval Air Station Joint Reserve Base Fort Worth, Texas

- 307th Bomb Wing (B-52H) (AFGSC)

(Operationally gained by Air Force Global Strike Command)
Barksdale Air Force Base, Louisiana

- 310th Space Wing (USSF)

Associate unit with 50th Space Wing
(Operationally gained by the United States Space Force)
Schriever Air Force Base, Colorado

- 340th Flying Training Group (T-1A, T-6A, T-38B/C, AT-38B) (AETC)

Associate unit with 12th Flying Training Wing
(Operationally gained by Air Education and Training Command)
Randolph Field, Joint Base San Antonio, Texas

- 414th Fighter Group (F-15E)

Associate unit with 4th Fighter Wing
Seymour Johnson Air Force Base, North Carolina

- 419th Fighter Wing (F-35A)

Associate unit with 388th Fighter Wing
Hill Air Force Base, Utah

- 442d Fighter Wing (A-10C)

Whiteman Air Force Base, Missouri

- 476th Fighter Group (A-10C)

Associate unit with 23d Wing
Moody Air Force Base, Georgia

- 477th Fighter Group (F-22A) (PACAF)

Associate unit with 3d Wing
(Operationally gained by Pacific Air Forces)
Joint Base Elmendorf-Richardson, Alaska

- 482d Fighter Wing (F-16C/D)

Homestead Air Reserve Base, Florida
1 of 2 fighter squadrons is an Active Associate with the 495th Fighter Group
Shaw AFB, South Carolina

- 513th Air Control Group (E-3G)

Associate unit with 552d Air Control Wing
Tinker Air Force Base, Oklahoma

- 655th Intelligence, Surveillance and Reconnaissance Wing (ISR)

Wright-Patterson Air Force Base, Ohio

- 960th Cyberspace Operations Group (Cyber)

Lackland AFB, Texas

- 919th Special Operations Wing (MQ-9, U-28, C-146, AC-130J) (AFSOC)

(Operationally gained by Air Force Special Operations Command)
Duke Field, Florida

- 920th Rescue Wing (HH-60W, HC-130J)

Patrick Space Force Base, Florida

- 926th Wing (F-22A, F-35A, F-16C/D, A-10C, MQ-9)

Associate unit with 57th Wing (706th Aggressor Squadron)
Nellis Air Force Base, Nevada
Associate unit with 432d Wing (78th Attack Squadron and 91st Attack Squadron)
Creech Air Force Base, Nevada
Associate unit with 53d Wing (84th Test and Evaluation Squadron)
Eglin Air Force Base, Florida
Associate unit with 527th Space Aggressor Squadron (26th Space Aggressor Squadron) (USSF)
(Operationally gained by the United States Space Force)
Schriever Air Force Base, Colorado

- 943d Rescue Group (HH-60W)

GSU of the 920th Rescue Wing, Patrick Space Force Base, FL
Davis-Monthan Air Force Base, Arizona

- 944th Fighter Wing (F-16C/D) (AETC)

Associate unit with 56th Fighter Wing
(Operationally gained by Air Education and Training Command)
Luke Air Force Base, Arizona

- 924th Fighter Group (A-10C)

GSU of the 944th Fighter Wing
Davis-Monthan Air Force Base, Arizona

- 610th Regional Support Group

Naval Air Station Joint Reserve Base Fort Worth, Texas

Twenty-Second Air Force (22 AF)
Dobbins Air Reserve Base, Georgia

- 94th Airlift Wing (C-130H)

Dobbins Air Reserve Base, Georgia

- 302d Airlift Wing (C-130H)

Peterson Air Force Base, Colorado

- 403d Wing (C-130J, WC-130J)

Keesler Air Force Base, Mississippi

- 908th Flying Training Wing (MH-139)

Maxwell Air Force Base, Alabama

- 910th Airlift Wing (C-130H)

Youngstown-Warren Air Reserve Station, Ohio

- 913th Airlift Group – Associate (C-130J)

Little Rock AFB, Arkansas

- 932d Airlift Wing (C-40C)

Associate unit with 375th Air Mobility Wing
Scott Air Force Base, Illinois

- 934th Airlift Wing (C-130H)

Minneapolis-St Paul Joint Air Reserve Station, Minnesota

== History ==
=== Total Force concept ===
The Air Force Reserve (AFRES) was created as a separate operating agency (SOA) and replaced a major command – Continental Air Command – which inactivated in August 1968. Upon activation, AFRES assumed command of all personnel, equipment and aircraft previously assigned to ConAC.

As the 1970s unfolded, the challenge then was to find the right mix of forces for mission effectiveness. Secretary of Defense Melvin Laird adopted the Total Force concept in August 1970 with Secretary of Defense James Schlesinger declaring it policy in 1973.

With the implementation of the Total Force Policy, the Air Force Reserve became a multi-mission force, flying the same modern aircraft as the active Air Force. Mobilization planning and operational evaluation were integrated with the corresponding active duty functions. With the same equipment and budget authority, the Air Force Reserve was held to the same readiness standards and inspections as regular Air Force units. Special operations, air refueling, weather reconnaissance, and, once again, fighter missions were added to the airlift, rescue, and mission support roles performed by the Air Force Reserve. The associate concept soon expanded to include the C-5 Galaxy.

=== Cold War era ===
Air Force Reserve participation in Air Force exercises and deployments perfected its mobility capabilities as demonstrated throughout the seventies. This was most notable during Operation Nickel Grass, the Israeli assistance airlift of 1973, with some 630 crew members volunteering for Middle East missions including flying into Ben Gurion Airport, Tel Aviv. Another 1,590 Reservists performed missions worldwide, freeing up additional active crews to support the airlift.

The 1980s saw the modernization and expansion of the Air Force Reserve program. KC-10 Extenders joined the associate force in 1981, expanding its air refueling capability. Fighter units obtained the more modern A-10 Thunderbolt II ground support aircraft and F-4 Phantom IIs, and in 1984, the Air Force Reserve received its first F-16A Fighting Falcon. Operationally, the Air Force Reserve participated in Operation Urgent Fury, the return of American students from Grenada in 1983, performed air refuelings of F-111 bombers during the El Dorado Canyon raid on Libyan-sponsored terrorists in 1986, and acted as a full partner in Operation Just Cause which ousted Panama's General Manuel Noriega in 1989–1990. Air Force Reservists also supported humanitarian and disaster relief efforts, including resupply and evacuation missions in the aftermath of 1989's Hurricane Hugo. The Reserve's continual volunteering allayed the concerns of those who believed the Air Force Reserve would not be available when really needed.

=== Middle East and Yugoslav operations ===
Air Force Reserve airlift and tanker crews were flying within days of Saddam Hussein's Invasion of Kuwait in August 1990. When ground operations commenced as part of Operation Desert Storm, Air Force Reserve A-10s from the NAS New Orleans–based 926th Tactical Fighter Group (926 TFG) operated close to the front lines along with Air Force Reserve special operations and rescue forces. A Reservist scored the first-ever A-10 air-to-air kill. When Operations Desert Shield/Storm ended, the Air Force Reserve counted 23,500 Reservists mobilized with another 15,000 serving in a volunteer capacity.

The Air Force Reserve had become indistinguishable from the active force in capability; there was no difference between an Air Force Reserve pilot and an active duty pilot, or a boom operator, or loadmaster.

In the aftermath of Desert Storm, Air Force Reservists continued to serve and were heavily involved in both Operation Northern Watch and Operation Southern Watch during the 1990s, enforcing the United Nations-mandated no-fly zones over northern and southern Iraq as well as in humanitarian relief missions during Operation Provide Comfort to assist uprooted Iraqi Kurds. For over six years, Air Force Reserve C-130s performed these Provide Comfort missions on a rotational basis while F-16s and combat rescue HH-60 Pave Hawks deployed to Incirlik Air Base, Turkey, for the no-fly operations. In 1993, when tensions mounted in Bosnia, Air Force Reserve tanker and fighter units participated in enforcing the Operation Deny Flight no-fly zone while airlift units ensured logistical resupply.

Following Operation DESERT STORM in 1991, the Air Force increasingly relied on its Air Reserve Component, both AFRC and ANG, for a "steady state" of daily assistance, whether it was flying airlift channel; providing fighter, tanker and theater airlift support of "no fly" zone enforcement operations in Southwest Asia; aerial fire fighting; aerial spray; hurricane hunter missions; military air/sea rescue support of NASA Space Shuttle operations; or providing highly skilled medical and aeromedical personnel. As a result, Congress sought to clarify the organizational placement of the Air Force Reserve (AFRES) in the larger active duty Air Force organizational structure. Accordingly, in February 1997, the Air Force Reserve (AFRES) officially became the Air Force Reserve Command (AFRC), the Air Force's ninth major command.

Between March and September 1999, Air Force Reservists volunteered and were also mobilized for Operation Allied Force operations over Serbia and Kosovo. The involuntary recall marked the ninth time the Air Force had requested a mobilization of Air Force Reserve units and personnel since 1950. Reservists provided 150,000 mandays of support spanning the spectrum of Air Force missions, proving itself ready to perform the full range of Air Force operations in sync with the new Air Expeditionary Task Force (AEF) concepts.

=== Global war on terrorism ===
When terrorists attacked the United States on 11 September 2001, Air Force Reservists responded in full measure. Air Force Reserve F-16 Fighting Falcon fighters flew Combat air patrols (CAPs) protecting America's cities while AFRC KC-135 Stratotankers and E-3 Sentry AWACs aircraft supported with air refuelings and security. In October 2001, the United States initiated the global war on terrorism as military forces entered Afghanistan to combat the Taliban in Operation Enduring Freedom (OEF). Air Force Reserve special operations MC-130 Combat Talon aircraft became the first fixed-wing aircraft to penetrate Afghan airspace while Air Force Reserve F-16 crews, already deployed in theater for Operation Southern Watch, performed the first combat missions.

Air Force Reservists made significant contributions by flying close air support, combat delivery, rescue, strategic airlift, and air refueling missions supporting operations in Afghanistan. They also provided B-52 Stratofortress, special operations, aeromedical, security forces, and civil engineering support. Air Force Reserve A-10s, HH-60s and C-130 Hercules continue to perform rotational tours in Afghanistan, and Air Force Reservists have been instrumental in building the Afghan National Army Air Corps.

When Operation Iraqi Freedom (OIF), the war against Saddam Hussein's regime in Iraq began in March 2003, Air Force Reserve combat-ready A-10, B-52, and F-16 aircrews flew numerous strike operations during the first hours of engagement and performed special operations and rescue missions. Air Reserve rescue personnel were among the first into Tallil Air Base as Reserve A-10s provided close air support. Part of the lead tanker force, Reserve tankers offloaded more than 21 million pounds of fuel to more than 1,000 aircraft. In late March 2003, fifteen C-17 Globemaster III Reserve associate crews supported the C-17 airdrop, which opened up the Northern Front in Iraq.

Additionally, Reservists supported Air Force Unmanned aerial vehicles (UAV) missions and space-based operations in Southwest Asia, providing essential data to battlefield commanders. During the combat phase (19 March-1 May) of OIF, Air Force Reserve aircraft and crews flew nearly 162,000 hours and deployed 70 unit-equipped aircraft in theater while aeromedical personnel provided 45 percent of the Air Force's aeromedical crews that performed 3,108 patient movements.

The Air Force Reserve continues to expand its associate construct across the mission spectrum. Specific examples are the Air Force Reserve 477th Fighter Group associating at Joint Base Elmendorf-Richardson, Alaska, flying the F-22 Raptor jointly with the PACAF 3d Wing and the active duty associating with the C-40 Clipper-equipped 932d Airlift Wing with the 375th Air Mobility Wing at Scott AFB, Illinois, and the 433d Airlift Wing C-5 Galaxy at Joint Base San Antonio, Texas. On the horizon, associate units will include future weapon systems such as the F-35 Lightning II and the Next-Generation Bomber in the 2020s.

=== Lineage ===
- The War Department established an Army Air Forces Air Reserve Program as part of the United States Army Air Forces, July 1946. With the establishment of an independent U.S. Air Force in September 1947, Air Force Reserve personnel and units were assigned to Continental Air Command (CONAC).
- Established as Air Force Reserve (AFRES) and activated as an Air Force Separate Operating Agency (SOA) on 21 June 1968

Organized on 1 August 1968, assuming reserve assets of Continental Air Command (Inactivated)
Status changed from SOA to an Air Force Direct Reporting Unit (DRU) on 1 July 1978
Status changed from DRU and returned to SOA status on 1 May 1983
Status changed from SOA to an Air Force Field Operating Agency (FOA) on 5 February 1991
Re-designated as Air Force Reserve Command (AFRC) and status changed from a FOA to a Major Command (MAJCOM) of the United States Air Force on 17 February 1997

=== Assignments ===
- United States Air Force, Since 1 August 1968

=== Components ===
Air Forces

Air Force Reserve's entire intermediate management structure was realigned effective 8 October 1976. The Reserve Regions were inactivated and succeeded by the reactivated Fourth, Tenth and Fourteenth Air Forces

- Fourth (Reserve) (later, Fourth) Air Force: Since 8 October 1976
- Tenth (Reserve) (later, Tenth) Air Force: Since 8 October 1976
- Fourteenth (Reserve) (later, Fourteenth) Air Force: 8 October 1976 – 1 July 1993
- Twenty-Second Air Force: Since 1 July 1993

Regions

- First Air Force Reserve Region: 1 August 1968 – 31 December 1969
- Third Air Force Reserve Region: 1 August 1968 – 31 December 1969
- Fourth Air Force Reserve Region: 1 August 1968 – 31 December 1969
- Fifth Air Force Reserve Region: 1 August 1968 – 31 December 1969
- Sixth Air Force Reserve Region: 1 August 1968 – 31 December 1969
- Central Air Force Reserve Region: 31 December 1969 – 8 October 1976

(Ellington AFB, TX) Became Responsible for the Fourth and Fifth Region areas

- Eastern Air Force Reserve Region: 31 December 1969 – 8 October 1976

(Dobbins AFB, GA) Became responsible for the First and Third Region areas

- Western Air Force Reserve Region: 31 December 1969 – 8 October 1976

(Hamilton AFB, CA) Re-designation of the Sixth Air Force Reserve Region

Support components

- Individual Mobilization Augmentee Readiness Management Group: Since 1 April 2005
- 8600th Air Force Reserve Command Support (later, 952nd Reserve Support Squadron; Air Force Reserve Command Force Generation Center): Since 1 February 1991
- Air Reserve Personnel Center (ARPC): 1 July 1978 – 1 May 1983; Since 15 September 1997
- Air Force Reserve Command Recruiting Service (AFRC/RS): Since 1 October 1994
- 581st Air Force Band (later, Command Band of the Air Force Reserve; Band of the Air Force Reserve; Band of the USAF Reserve): 1 August 1968 – 1 October 2016
- 2400th Reserve Advisor Squadron (later, 2400th Reserve Readiness and Mobility Squadron; 951st Reserve Support Squadron): 1 December 1972 – present
- 953d Reserve Support Squadron: 1 July 1997 – 1 October 2011
- 954th Reserve Support Flight (later, 954th Reserve Support Squadron): 15 December 1997 – 1 October 2011
- 954th Reserve Support Squadron: Since 1 October 2011

=== Stations ===
- Robins Air Force Base, Georgia, Since 1 August 1968

== Notable Reservists ==
- Maj Gen William Anders, NASA astronaut on Apollo 8 and former United States ambassador
- Lt Col John Boccieri, former member of Congress
- Maj Gen Howard Cannon, former United States senator
- Maj Gen Thomas L. Carter, former representative of the United States on the Council of the International Civil Aviation Organization
- Lt Col Doug Collins, former member of Congress
- SSgt Jeff Denham, former member of Congress
- Lt Gen Jimmy Doolittle, Medal of Honor recipient, first president of the Air Force Association, Chairman of the National Advisory Committee for Aeronautics and first Air Force Reserve officer to achieve Lieutenant General (O-9) rank, albeit in the Army Air Forces, and the first Air Force Reserve officer to be promoted to General (O-10) on the Retired List
- Brig Gen Charles Duke, NASA astronaut on Apollo 16
- Lt Col Ivan Edwards, flight surgeon, ex-pastor, humanitarian and community activist - despite early exposure to military dictatorships, chose to serve in the US military
- Col Michael E. Fossum, NASA Astronaut on STS-121 and STS-124
- Maj Gen Barry Goldwater, former United States senator
- Col Lindsey Graham, United States senator
- Maj John Paul Hammerschmidt, former member of Congress
- Lt Col Christopher B. Howard, president of Robert Morris University
- Col Ted Lieu, Member of Congress
- Maj Gen William Lyon, Southern California businessman and founder of the Lyon Air Museum
- Maj Gen Joseph McNeil, member of the Greensboro Four
- Gen Maryanne Miller, former commander, Air Force Reserve Command, former commander, Air Mobility Command, and first Air Force Reserve officer in an active status to achieve the rank of General (O-10)
- Col Rudy Moise, flight surgeon, lawyer, politician and businessman - ex-president of Dade County Medical Association, founder of the first Creole-language radio station, entrepreneur, and actor
- Col Robert K. Morgan, pilot of the Memphis Belle (aircraft)
- Col August Pfluger, Member of Congress
- Maj Gen Mark Rosenker, former chairman of the National Transportation Safety Board
- Capt Mark Sanford, former member of Congress and former governor of South Carolina
- Capt Roy Scheider, film actor known for roles in Jaws (film) and The French Connection (film)
- Maj Gen Josef Schmid, NASA flight surgeon, was an aquanaut on NEEMO 12, visited space via telepresence
- Brig Gen James Stewart, Academy Award-winning film actor, B-24 Liberator pilot during World War II and recipient of the Distinguished Flying Cross
- Col Bruce Sundlun, former governor of Rhode Island
- A3C Joseph P. Teasdale, former governor of Missouri
- Lt Col Roger Wicker, United States senator

== List of commanders ==
No.	Commander		Term		
No.	Portrait	Name	Took office	Left office	Term length
1	Robert A. McIntosh	Major General; Robert A. McIntosh	1 November 1994	9 June 1998	3 years, 220 days
-	David R. Smith	Major General; David R. Smith; Acting	9 June 1998	25 September 1998	108 days
2	James E. Sherrard III	Lieutenant General (in 2001); James E. Sherrard III	25 September 1998	1 June 2004	5 years, 250 days
-	John J. Batbie Jr.	Major General; John J. Batbie Jr. Acting	1 June 2004	24 June 2004	23 days
3	John A. Bradley	Lieutenant General; John A. Bradley	24 June 2004	24 June 2008	4 years, 0 days
4	Charles E. Stenner Jr.	Lieutenant General; Charles E. Stenner Jr.	24 June 2008	30 July 2012	4 years, 36 days
5	James F. Jackson	Lieutenant General; James F. Jackson	30 July 2012	15 July 2016	3 years, 351 days
6	Maryanne Miller	Lieutenant General; Maryanne Miller	15 July 2016	27 September 2018	2 years, 74 days
7	Richard W. Scobee	Lieutenant General; Richard W. Scobee	27 September 2018	3 August 2022	3 years, 310 days
8	John P. Healy	Lieutenant General; John P. Healy	3 August 2022	3 August 2026	4 years, 0 days
9	Paul R. Fast	Lieutenant General; Paul R. Fast	3 August 2026	Incumbent	68 days

== See also ==
Comparable organizations

- Air National Guard (U.S. Air Force)
- Army National Guard (U.S. Army)
- United States Army Reserve
- United States Coast Guard Reserve
- United States Marine Corps Reserve
- United States Navy Reserve
- Command Chief Master Sergeant, Air Force Reserve Command
