= Hurricane hunters =

Aircrews that fly into tropical cyclones to gather weather data

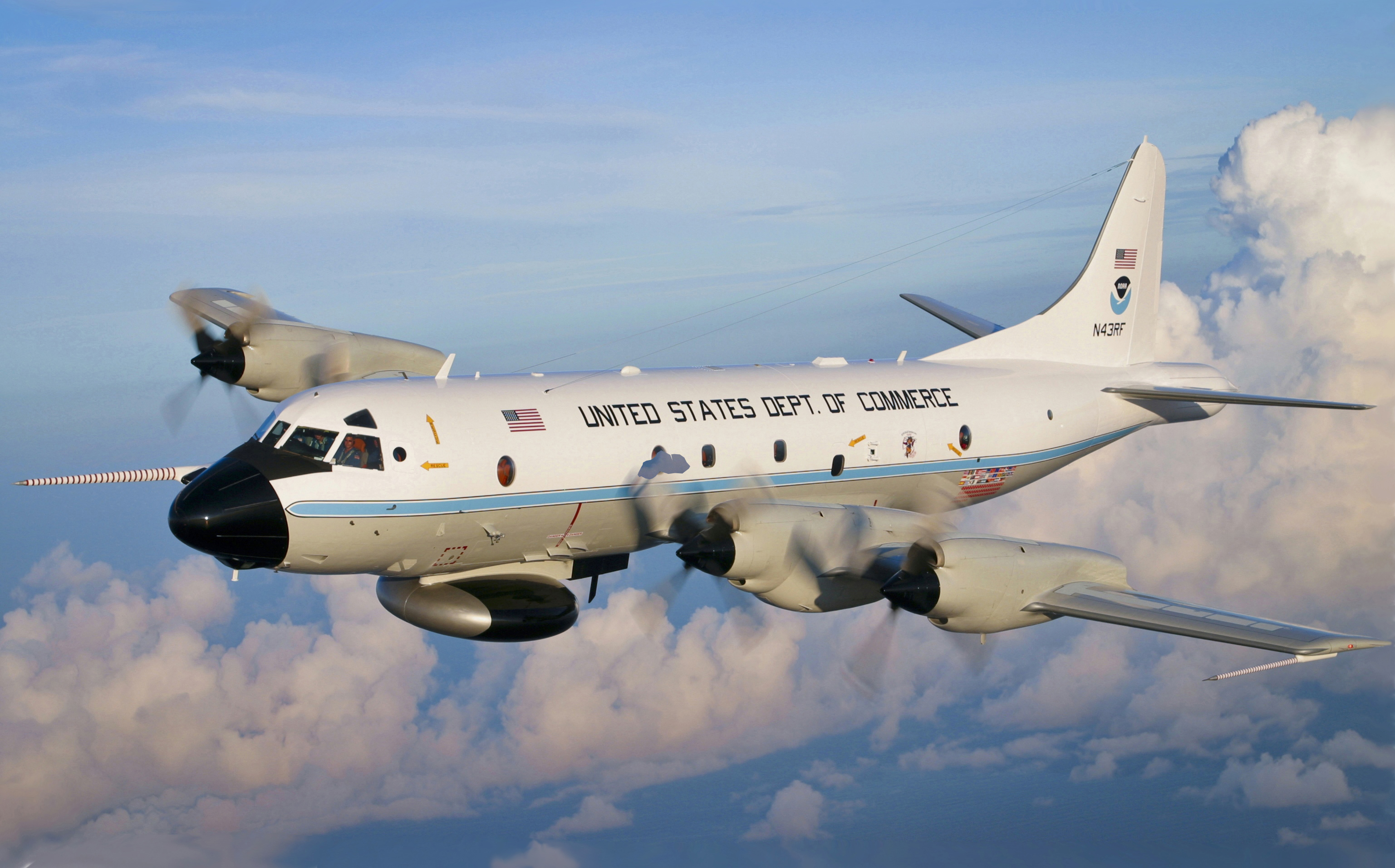
A NOAA WP-3D Orion weather reconnaissance aircraft

Hurricane hunters, typhoon hunters, or cyclone hunters are aircrews that fly into tropical cyclones to gather weather data. In the United States, the organizations that fly these missions are the United States Air Force Reserve's 53rd Weather Reconnaissance Squadron and the National Oceanic and Atmospheric Administration's Hurricane Hunters. Such missions have also been flown by Navy units and other Air Force and NOAA units. Other organizations also fly these missions, such as Hong Kong Government Flying Service.

The first crewed flight into a hurricane happened in 1943 when a pilot-trainer flew into a Category 1 hurricane near Galveston, Texas on a bet.

In the past, before satellites were used to find tropical storms, military aircraft flew routine weather reconnaissance tracks to detect formation of tropical cyclones. While modern satellites have improved the ability of meteorologists to detect cyclones before they form, only aircraft are able to measure the interior barometric pressure of a hurricane and provide accurate wind speed data, information needed to accurately predict hurricane development and movement.

== Units ==
=== USAFR 53rd WRS ===
The Air Force Reserve 53rd Weather Reconnaissance Squadron, the world's only operational military weather reconnaissance unit, is based at Keesler Air Force Base in Biloxi, Mississippi; most weather recon flights originate there. The term "hurricane hunters" was first applied to its missions in 1946.

The USAFR hurricane hunters fly weather missions in an area midway through the Atlantic Ocean to the Hawaiian Islands, and have on occasion flown into typhoons in the Pacific Ocean and gathered data in winter storms.

The 53rd WRS hurricane hunters operate ten Lockheed WC-130J aircraft, which fly directly into hurricanes, typically penetrating the hurricane's eye several times per mission at altitudes between 500 feet (150 m) and 10,000 feet (3,000 m).

=== NOAA Hurricane Hunters ===
The civilian and NOAA Corps crew members of the NOAA Hurricane Hunters, originally based at the Aircraft Operations Center at MacDill AFB, in Tampa, Florida, mainly perform surveillance, research, and reconnaissance with highly instrumented aircraft including airborne Doppler weather radar measurements in both Atlantic and Pacific storms. In June 2017 the Hunters moved into a new facility at Lakeland Linder International Airport in Lakeland, Florida, having been at MacDill since 1993. They fly two Lockheed WP-3D Orion aircraft, heavily instrumented flying laboratories modified to take atmospheric and radar measurements within tropical cyclones and winter storms, and a G-IV Gulfstream high-altitude jet above 41,000 feet (12 km) to document upper- and lower-level winds that affect cyclone movement. The computer models that forecast hurricane tracks and intensity mainly use G-IV dropsonde data collected day and night in storms affecting the United States.

On September 27, 2024, NOAA announced it had awarded a contract to Lockheed Martin Aeronautics for two Lockheed Martin C-130J Super Hercules aircraft configured for use as hurricane hunters to replace its aging WP-3D Orions, with service entry planned in 2030.

=== Government Flying Service Hong Kong ===
The Government Flying Service of Hong Kong (GFS) and their precursor RHKAAF conduct tropical cyclone reconnaissance operations. Since 2009 the GFS have conducted regular flight data collection in cooperation with the Hong Kong Observatory. In 2011, the cooperation between GFS and the Observatory extended to reconnaissance flights to capture weather data for tropical cyclones over the South China Sea. In September 2016 they introduced the dropsonde system, which collects extra meteorological data on tropical cyclones to enhance the monitoring of typhoons.

== History ==
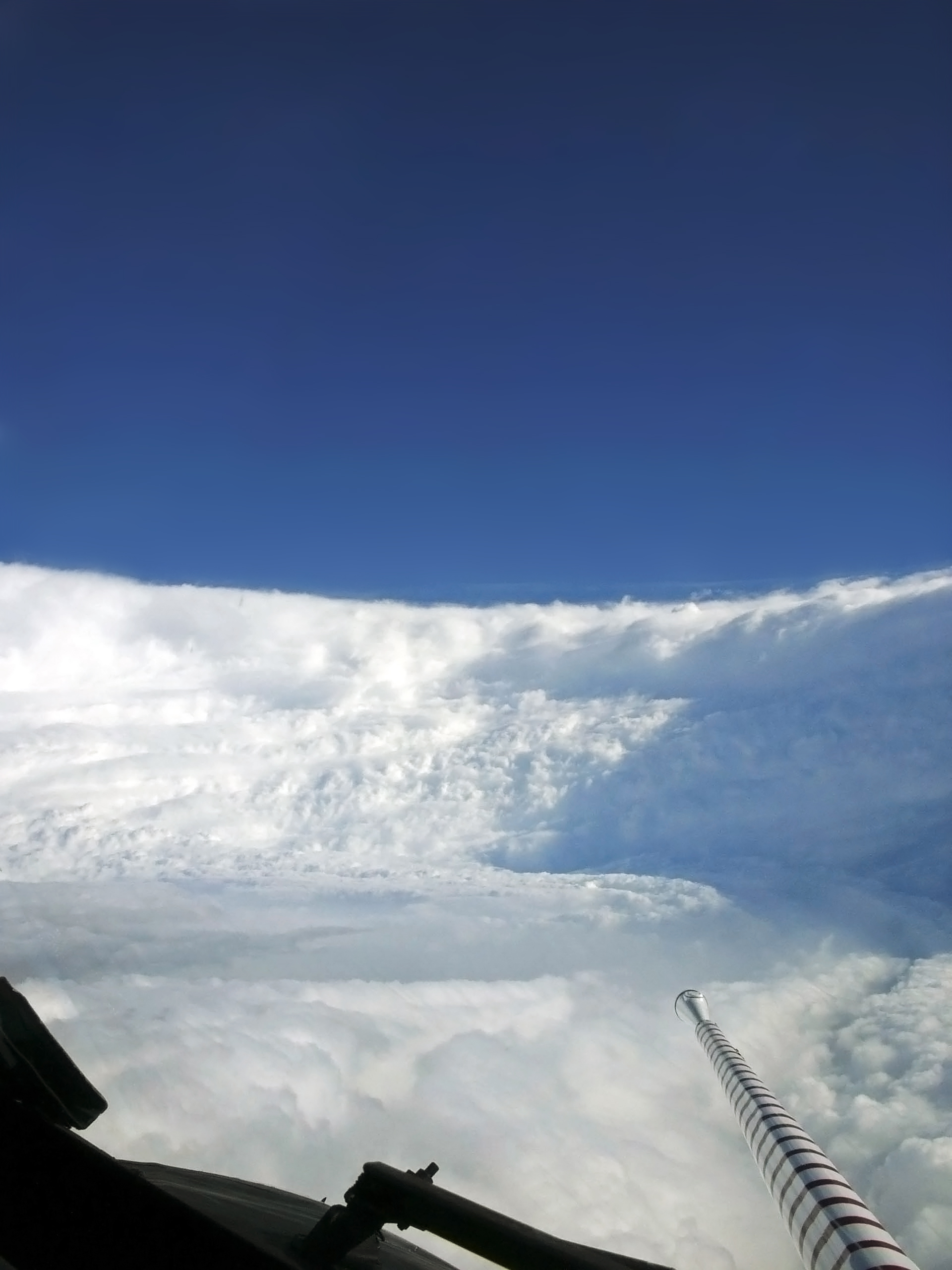
View of the eyewall of Hurricane Katrina taken on August 28, 2005, by a NOAA P-3.

Among the types of aircraft that have been used to investigate hurricanes, are an instrumented Lockheed U-2 flown in Hurricane Ginny during the 1963 Atlantic hurricane season. Other types include the A-20 Havoc, 1944; B-24, 1944–1945; B-17, 1945–1947; B-25, 1946–1947; B-29, 1946–1947. WB-29, 1951–1956; WB-50, 1956–1963; WB-47, 1963–1969; WC-121N 1954–1973; WC-130A, B, E, H, 1965–2012.

The idea of aircraft reconnaissance of hurricane storm trackers was put forth by Captain W. L. Farnsworth of the Galveston Commercial Association in the early 1930s. Supported by the United States Weather Bureau, the "storm patrol bill" passed both the United States Senate and United States House of Representatives on June 15, 1936.

=== First Hurricane Flights ===
==== 1935 Labor Day Hurricane ====
The first time a reconnaissance flight took place with the sole purpose of locating a hurricane was during the 1935 Great Labor Day Hurricane, which would later become the strongest storm to ever impact the U.S.

On September 1, the storm moved through The Bahamas where it was estimated to be at hurricane strength. As a result, ships began to avoid the Florida Straits, depriving the Weather Bureau of valuable information. This led to confusion as the Weather Bureau believed it would continue on its westward path and make landfall in Cuba while the Cuba weather service didn't see any evidence for this.

On September 2, a pilot flying over the Florida Keys noticed a large cloud mass to the east and more north than it should have been. The Cuban weather service requested a plane to be sent up to find the storm, with Captain Leonard Povey volunteering. After circling, but not penetrating (his plane had an open cockpit), the storm, he confirmed the storm was located more north than originally thought and actually heading northeast. This was relayed to the Weather Bureau, which immediately put warnings out for the Florida Keys. The storm would make landfall later that day.

Povey urged Congress and the Weather Bureau to implement full-time reconnaissance planes, but to no avail. A plan was laid out to use Coast Guard cutters, but was never implemented.

==== 1943 Surprise Hurricane ====
The 1943 Surprise Hurricane, which struck Houston, Texas, during World War II, marked the first intentional meteorological flight into a hurricane. It started with a bet.

That summer, British pilots were being trained in instrument flying at Bryan Field. When they saw that the Americans were evacuating their AT-6 Texan trainers in the face of the storm, they began questioning the construction of the aircraft. Lead instructor Colonel Joe Duckworth took one of the trainers out and flew it straight into the eye of the storm. After he returned safely with navigator Lt. Ralph O'Hair, the base's weather officer, Lt. William Jones-Burdick, took over the navigator's seat and Duckworth flew into the storm a second time. This flight showed that hurricane reconnaissance flights were possible, and further flights continued occasionally.

==== 1944 Great Atlantic Hurricane ====
As the Air Force was assembling the 3rd Weather Reconnaissance Squadron, Major Harry Wexler became the first person to fly through a hurricane and record direct weather measurements in a hurricane, though it was specifically for research.

Major Wexler was part of the USAAF Weather Division based in Washington D.C. As the Great Atlantic Hurricane made its way up the East Coast, his team realized this may be their only chance to measure the environment in a hurricane given how rare storms close to there are. On September 14, he took his suited up Douglas A-20 Havoc and flew into the storm at 3,000ft., finding over 200km/h winds and for the first time both updrafts and downdrafts - the accepted theory at the time was that there were only updrafts.

=== U.S. Military Starts Center Fixes ===
Building off this success of the Surprise Hurricane, on August 14, 1944 the 3rd Weather Reconnaissance Squadron was formed with the sole purpose of locating and center fixing hurricanes. The first storm to be surveyed that year would occur a month later when the Great Atlantic Hurricane barreled up the East Coast. The pilots were able to maintain constant location fixes on the storm tracking it all the way up to the Northeast where it made landfall. Because of these constant location updates, the storm only caused 28 deaths and avoided a repeat of the 1938 New England Hurricane disaster.

Flights were limited to the Atlantic until December 18, 1944 when Task Force 3 sailed into the undetected Typhoon Cobra causing several ships to be sunk and 700 deaths. As a result, the 55th Reconnaissance Squadron was organized and arrived in Guam in January 1945, being tasked with regular synoptic route reconnaissance; their first mission in the Pacific was shortly later on February 3, 1945. In June of that year, Task Force 3 was struck again by the undetected, but weaker Typhoon Connie, though was last devastating. With this event, the military in the Pacific organized the Fleet Weather Central/Typhoon Tracking Center on Guam (renamed the Joint Typhoon Warning Center in 1955) and moved the 55th Squadron from synoptic surveillance to full-time typhoon reconnaissance and fixing. However, the first lost plane occurred shortly thereafter in October in Typhoon Jean.

In 1946, the moniker "Hurricane Hunters" was first used, and the Air Force and now Air Force Reserve have used it ever since.

=== Move to More Civilian Control ===
With the exception of Major Wexler's flight into the Great Atlantic Hurricane, all flights launched were to find the location and movement of the storm, with secondarily measuring pressure estimating wind strength by wave height. This was extremely dangerous planes had to fly very low to see the waves. The consequences became abundantly clear in the 1950's.

On October 22, 1952, a Boeing WB-29 Superfortress on a recon mission flew into Super Typhoon Wilma, a storm with 185mph winds. The plane sent in several distress calls before crashing with a loss of all 7 crew. Just over a year later on December 16, 1953, a PB4Y-2 Privateer flew into Super Typhoon Doris near Guam. The plane disappeared with another 10 deaths.

==== 1954 and 1955 Hurricane Seasons ====
In 1954, the military and Weather Bureau began to quickly prove that their current system was inadequate to forecast and track hurricanes. As Hurricane Carol began to move up the coast, regular reconnaissance missions maintained regular contact and on the 30th of September the storm brushed by North Carolina with 100 miles per hour (160 km/h) winds. The final forecast of the day stated it would continue at its current speed of 18 miles per hour (29 km/h) and curve out to sea. However, the storm instead sped up due north and slammed into the Northeast as a Category 3 the following morning. The area was caught completely by surprise in what felt like a repeat of the 1938 New England Hurricane with 70 deaths as a result. 11 days later, Hurricane Edna followed a similar track, but that time was better predicted. Later that year, Hurricane Hazel approached the Carolinas, though forecasters struggled to forecast it and incorrectly said it would remain offshore. People inland were also caught by surprise as the storm was picked up by another low pressure and continued to accelerate north, bringing hurricane force winds deep inland through the Mid Atlantic and Northeast, causing widespread power outages and tree damage.

In 1955, Hurricane Connie was better predicted in it its landfall in the Carolinas, but brought heavy rain across the Carolinas into the Northeast. Right behind it, Hurricane Diane also made landfall in the Carolinas as correctly predicted, but forecasters believed that like every other storm it would weaken and die overland. However, it instead maintained its core as it slowly moved inland, eventually turned right and traveling over New Jersey and back over the ocean where it reintensified south of New England. The storm ended up bringing over 15 inches (380 mm) of rain to many areas on ground already saturated by Connie, causing 200 deaths and becoming the first billion dollar disaster ever in the U.S. The Bureau was openly criticized for their bad forecast and Congress and the Bureau began working on reorganizing hurricane forecasting. Following this tragedy, Snowcloud Five flew into Hurricane Janet at 780 feet (240 m) and disappeared with a loss of all hands becoming the only hurricane hunter plane lost in the Atlantic.

During and following these catastrophes, the Weather Bureau and Air Force reorganized. In 1955, Congress funded and the Weather Bureau assembled the National Hurricane Research Project (NHRP) and made Robert Simpson it head while in 1956. The Bureau also moved all their other hurricane resources to Miami and established the National Hurricane Information Center in 1956. The Air Force began to make the standard height for flying into intense hurricanes 700mb or 10,000ft while also putting more instrumentation on the planes.

=== VW-4 ===
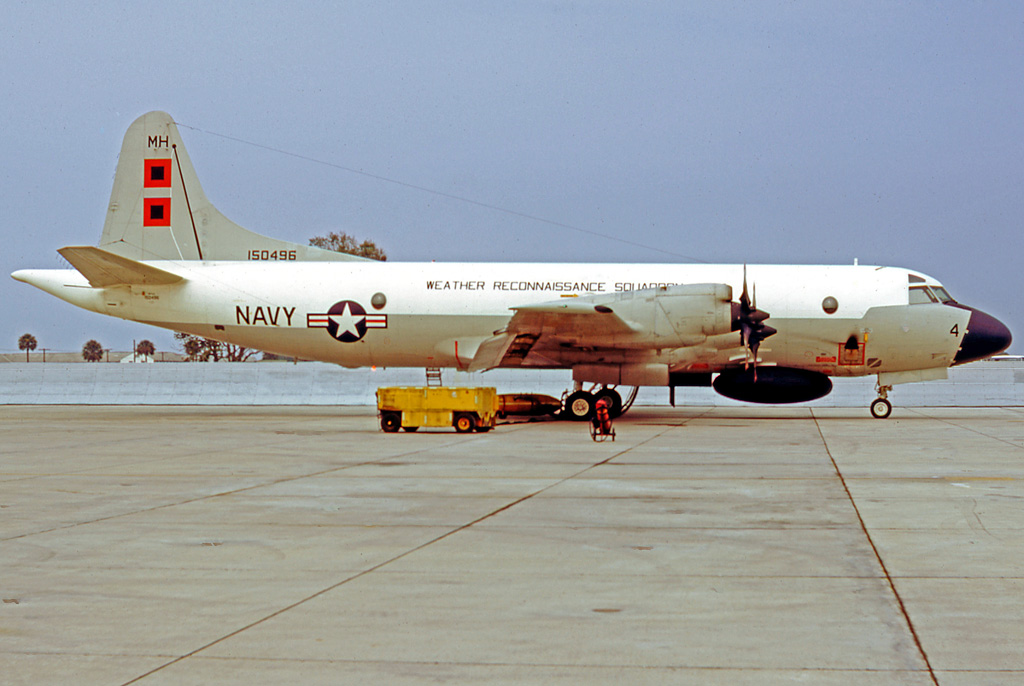
Lockheed WP-3A Orion weather reconnaissance aircraft of VW-4 Squadron at its NAS Jacksonville Florida base in 1974

The United States Navy's VW-4 / WEARECORON FOUR Weather Reconnaissance Squadron Four, "Hurricane Hunters" was the seventh U.S. Navy squadron dedicated to weather reconnaissance. They flew several types of aircraft, but the WC-121N "Willy Victor" was the aircraft most often associated with flying into the "eye of the storm." The squadron operated WC-121s between late 1954 and 1972. VW-4 lost one aircraft with its crew of 11 in a penetration of Hurricane Janet in 1955, and another to severe damage in a storm, but the severely damaged Willy Victor (MH-1) brought her crew home, although she never flew again. During 1973–1975, VW-4 operated the turbine-propeller Lockheed WP-3A Orion.

=== Hurricane Katrina ===
The landfall of Hurricane Katrina on 29 August 2005 devastated Keesler Air Force Base, home of the 53rd WRS. The equipment and personnel of the squadron were flying out of Dobbins Air Reserve Base near Atlanta. Despite heavy equipment losses, the squadron never missed a mission from the National Hurricane Center. The 53rd has since returned to Keesler.

== Aircraft losses ==
- October 1, 1945 – A United States Navy Consolidated PB4Y-2 Privateer (Bureau Number: 59415) of VPB-119 went down in Typhoon Jean over the South China Sea. All seven members of the crew were killed.
- October 26, 1952 – A United States Air Force Boeing WB-29 Superfortress (Serial Number: 44-69970) from the 54th Weather Reconnaissance Squadron was lost in Super Typhoon Wilma over the Pacific with 10 men aboard.
- December 16, 1953 – A United States Navy Consolidated PB4Y-2 Privateer (Bureau Number: 59716) of Airborne Early Warning Squadron (VW-3) was lost during reconnaissance of Super Typhoon Doris. All nine members of the crew were killed.
- September 26, 1955 – A United States Navy Lockheed P2V Neptune of Airborne Early Warning Squadron Four (VW-4) disappeared in Hurricane Janet over the Caribbean Sea with nine Navy men and two Canadian journalists aboard.
- January 15, 1958 – A United States Air Force Boeing WB-50 Superfortress (Serial Number: 49-295) from the 54th Weather Reconnaissance Squadron went down southeast of Guam while flying into Super Typhoon Ophelia with nine men aboard.
- October 12, 1974 – In 1974, a newly converted Lockheed WC-130 Hercules (Serial Number: 65-0965) was transferred to the 54th Weather Reconnaissance Squadron, the "Typhoon Chasers", at Andersen Air Force Base on Guam. The aircraft was sent to investigate Typhoon Bess. The crew departed Clark Air Base in the Philippines with the callsign "Swan 38". Radio contact with the aircraft was lost on 12 October 1974, apparently as the aircraft was heading into the typhoon's eye to make a second position fix. There were no radio transmissions indicating an emergency on board, and search teams could not locate the aircraft or its crew. All six crew members were listed as killed in action. Swan 38 was the only WC-130 lost in a storm.

=== Other incidents ===
- September 15, 1989 – While entering the eyewall of Hurricane Hugo, a NOAA WP-3D Orion (registration N42RF) encountered multiple severe downdrafts, causing the inboard right engine to overheat. The crew was forced to shut it down as the aircraft reached 220 m (720 ft) above the ocean in the eye. They dumped fuel and followed a United States Air Force WC-130 out of the hurricane. The aircraft sustained major damage and was grounded for the rest of the 1989 Atlantic hurricane season.
- February 9, 2007 – While inside of an extratropical cyclone, the same WP-3D Orion involved in the Hurricane Hugo incident suffered a compressor stall on three of its four engines at 240 m (790 ft) above the ocean, forcing the crew to shut them down. They were able to restart the engines and return to St. John's. Sea salt reduced the engine performance, which resulted in a compressor stall and a rain cloud the aircraft passed through caused the engines to be cleaned out, resulting in their restarting.

== In popular culture ==
A reality television series featuring the USAFR 53rd WRS, entitled Hurricane Hunters, debuted on The Weather Channel in July 2012.

The story of the NOAA 42 incident during Hurricane Hugo in 1989 was shown as part of the Mayday television show in 2015.

== See also ==
- Storm chasing – Pursuit of severe weather conditions
