= Galveston hurricane (disambiguation) =

The city of Galveston, Texas experienced several hurricanes throughout its history, including:

- 1900 Galveston hurricane, the deadliest natural disaster in the history of the United States.
- 1915 Galveston hurricane
- Hurricane Ike (2008) made landfall in Galveston.

== See also ==
- 1943 Surprise Hurricane, which made landfall in Galveston County but not Galveston Island
