= 54th Weather Reconnaissance Squadron =

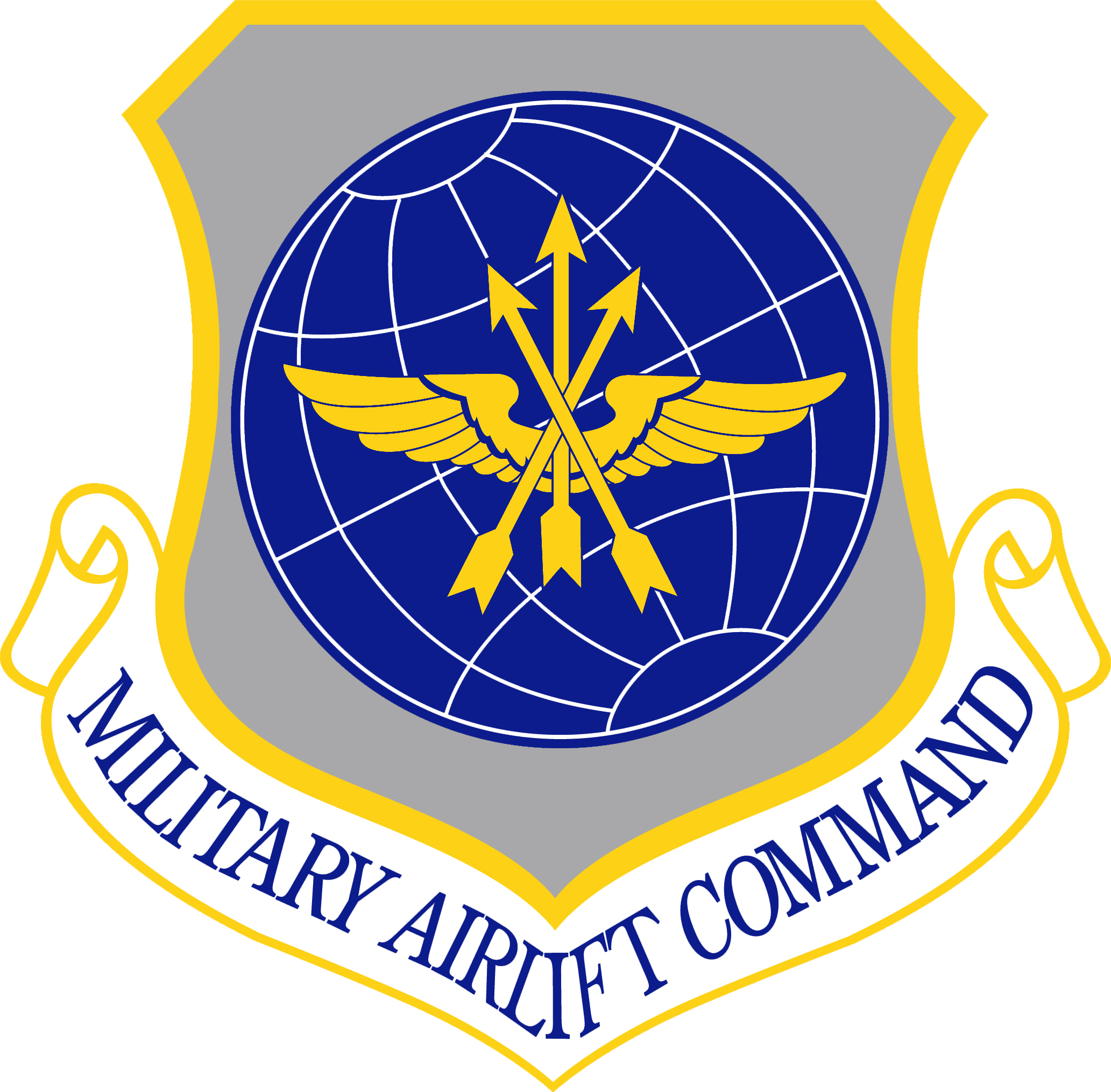
54th Weather Reconnaissance Squadron

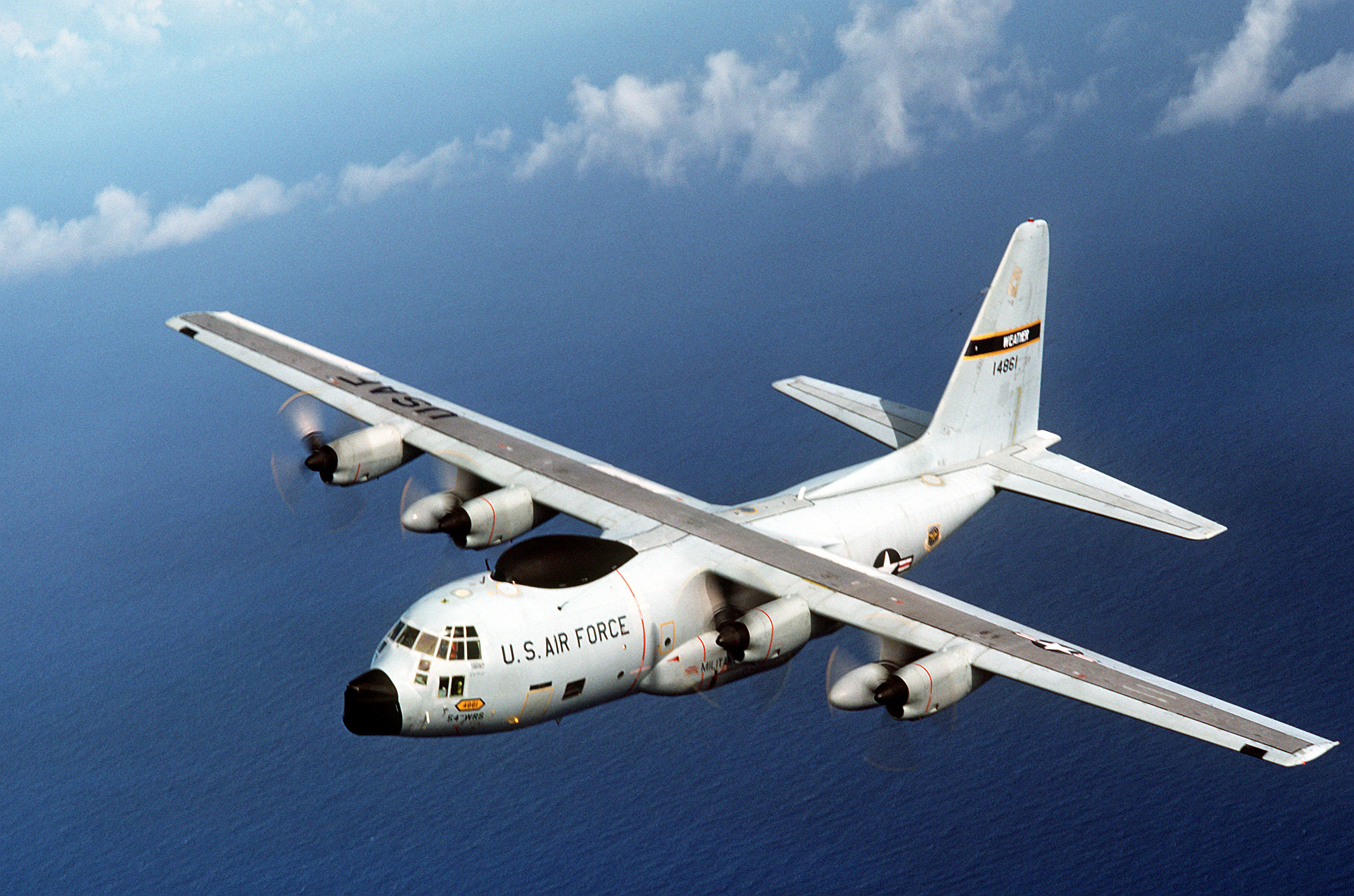
- 54th Weather Reconnaissance Squadron Lockheed WC-130 in flight (Note: Aircraft is HC-130H-LM Hercules, serial 64-14861. It was converted to a WC-130H in 1976. It was sent to the Aerospace Maintenance and Regeneration Center on 7 June 2016. Baugher, Joe (7 May 2023). "1964 USAF Serial Numbers". Joe Baugher.. Photo taken on a mission near Guam to monitor typhoons on 1 July 1977.)
- Active: 1944–1947; 1951–1960; 1962–1987
- Country: United States
- Branch: United States Air Force
- Role: Weather Reconnaissance
- Nicknames: Fireball (1951-1960); Vulture (1962-1973); Typhoon Chasers (1973-1987)
- Engagements: European Theater of Operations Korean War; Vietnam War: Operation Popeye
- Decorations: Air Force Outstanding Unit Award

Insignia
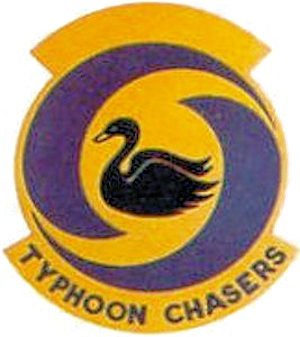
- 54th Weather Reconnaissance Squadron emblem (Note: Approved 29 November 1973. Significance: The emblem is symbolic of the unit and the Air Force colors of ultramarine blue and golden yellow are used in the design. The color blue alludes to the sky, the primary theater of Air Force operations, and yellow to the sun and the excellence of the personnel in assigned tasks. The international symbol for cyclones is superimposed on the disc. In the center of the cyclone is the likeness of the Australian Black Swan. This large and strikingly beautiful waterfowl is a native of Australia and the Pacific world. It also represents the weather track designators, the airborne call sign (weatherbird), as well as the squadron aircraft (i.e. Swan Birds). As a native of the Pacific, the swan also represents the location of the unit. The bird's plumage is black, representing the dark, rain-soaked clouds that often make up the wall cloud of a fully developed typhoon. The placement of the swan in the center of the cyclone represents the "eye" of a storm from which the aerial weather observstions are performed.)

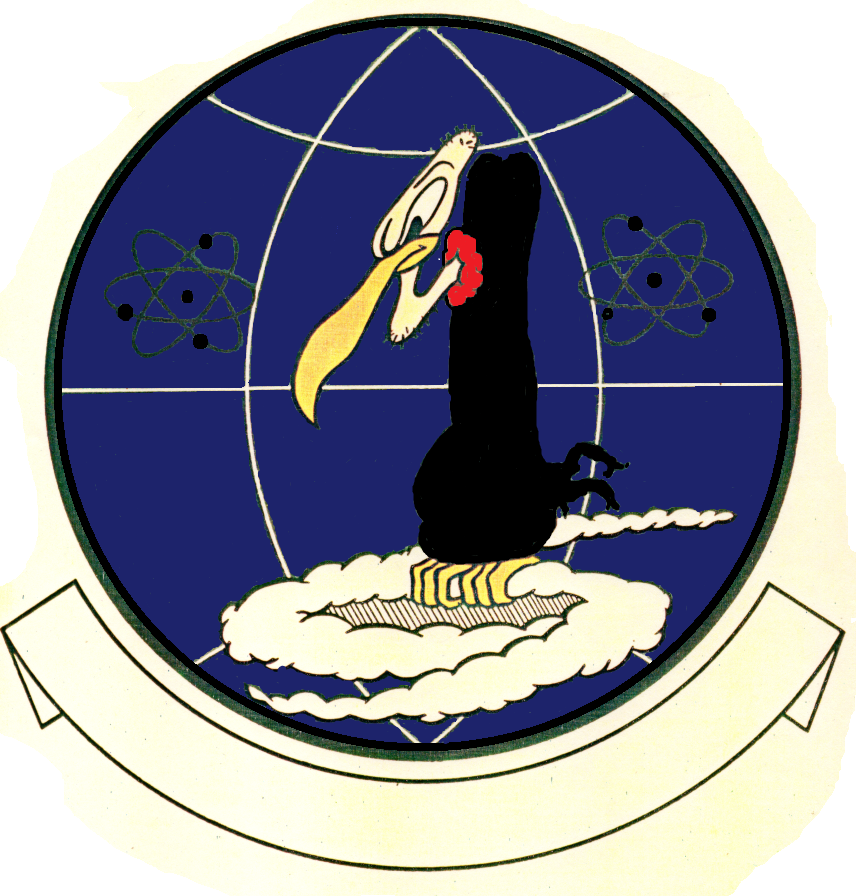
- 54th Weather Reconnaissance Squadron emblem (Note: Approved 9 July 1963. Significance: The globe represents the base area covered by the squadron's activities, the vulture being the name allotted to it by the Air Weather Service, bird names being used as squadron designators. The vulture, in having patience and an extremely keen eye, can spot its objective from extremely high altitudes and can fly for long periods of time. Standing on a cloud which represents a typhoon, the vulture alludes to the squadron's weather and storm reconnaissance mission. The two atom symbols refer to the squadron's participation in such advanced projects as aerial sampling, Dominic, Mercury, Apollo, and other similar projects which may be assigned.)

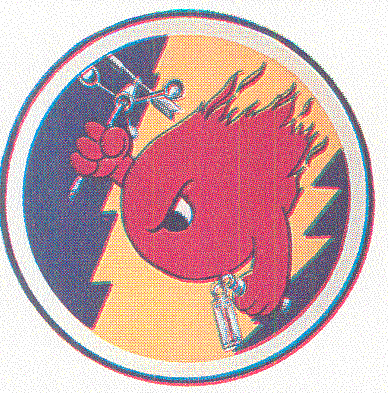
- 54th Strategic Reconnaissance Squadron emblem (Note: Approved 10 August 1951. Description: On a blue disc, edged white and blue a representation of a broad light flash with forked edges, yellow, starting from upper left (sinister) to lower right (dexter); thereon a stylized "fireball" red, moving downward, holding in the right hand a wind instrument and in the left a thermometer all gray. Significance: The stylized "fireball" symbolizes the high spirit and determination of the squadron. The wind instrument and thermometer are instruments used in carrying out the mission of the unit. The sky and light flash symbolize where the mission is performed.)

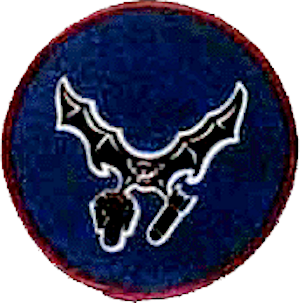
- 654th Bombardment Squadron emblem (Note: Approved 23 October 1944.)

The 54th Weather Reconnaissance Squadron is an inactive United States Air Force unit. Its last assignment was to the 41st Rescue and Weather Reconnaissance Wing at Andersen Air Force Base, Guam, where it was inactivated on 30 September 1987.

The squadron was first organized as the 654th Bombardment Squadron in August 1944. Flying de Havilland Mosquitos, the squadron provided weather and photographic reconnaissance and radar countermeasure support for VIII Bomber Command until V-E Day. It returned to the United States and equipped with Boeing B-29 Superfortress aircraft equipped for reconnaissance missions. Redesignated the 54th Reconnaissance Squadron it deployed to the Pacific, but arrived after hostilities had ended. It served until inactivating in 1947.

Redesignated the 54th Strategic Reconnaissance Squadron, the squadron resumed weather reconnaissance flights from Anderson Air Force Base, Guam, including some supporting forces in the Korean War. It was redesignated the 54th Weather Reconnaissancee Squadron in 1956 before inactivating in 1960. The squadron was reactivated in 1962 and continued the Pacific weather reconnaissance mission until 1987.

== History ==
=== World War II ===
==== Background ====
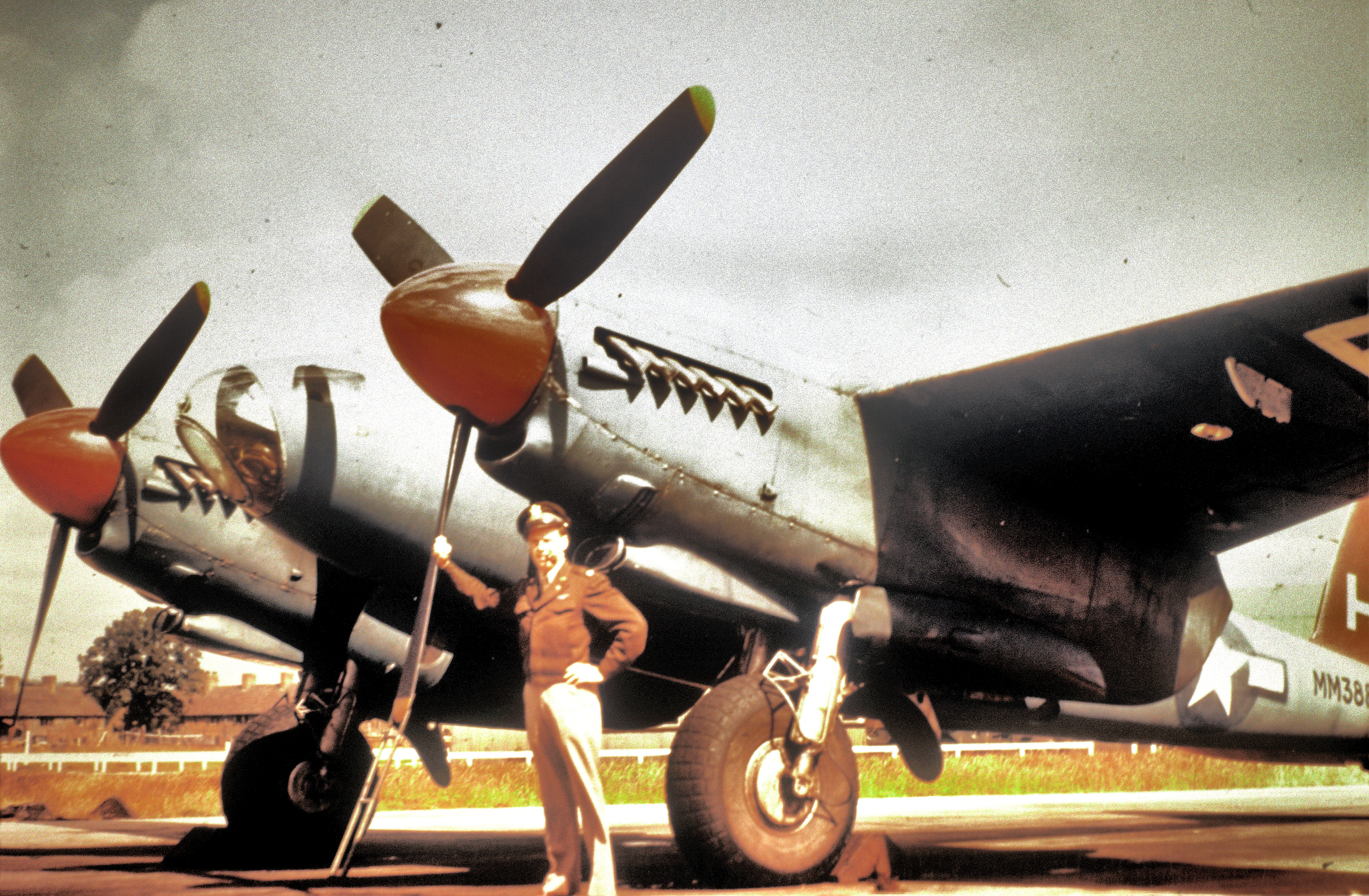
Squadron Mosquito at Chalgrove

Weather reconnaissance for VIII Bomber Command prior to March 1944 was provided on an ad hoc basis. The 18th Weather Squadron, which provided the command with weather observation and forecasting services through detachments located on each of the command's bases, detailed observers who flew on aircraft of various heavy bomber groups of the command. Rather than continuing to rely on individual bombardment units to perform this mission, on 22 March 1944, Eighth Air Force formed the 8th Reconnaissance Group (Provisional) at RAF Cheddington. On 30 March, the unit was redesignated the 802d Reconnaissance Group, Special (Provisional) and in April, the group moved to RAF Watton. The group's operational element was the 8th Reconnaissance Squadron (Provisional), which had been organized on 23 March 1944.

==== Operations ====
On 9 August 1944, the 802d Group was discontinued and its mission was transferred to the regular 25th Bombardment Group with three operational squadrons. The 654th was primarily equipped with de Havilland Mosquitos, whose pilots had mostly entered the 802d Group from the 50th Fighter Group, where they had gained experience on fast multi-engine planes with Lockheed P-38 Lightnings. The 654th mission focused on supplementing the long range aerial reconnaissance mission of the 7th Photographic Group on missions where its two crewmember Mosquitos could perform better than the single seat Lockheed F-5 Lightnings and Supermarine Spitfires of the 7th Group. The mission expanded to include chaff dispensing, night photographic missions, and scouting targets for last minute weather information shortly before bomber forces were to attack them. The speed of the Mosquito provided it a certain amount of protection from enemy fighters, but shortly after the squadron was activated, it began to receive opposition from Messerschmitt Me 262 Schwalbe jet fighters and its reconnaissance missions began to operate with friendly fighter cover. The squadron also operated a few medium bombers on these missions.

Following V-E Day, the 25th Group returned to the United States for inactivation. However, the squadron remained active and re-equipped with Boeing B-29 Superfortresses. In December, it deployed to North Field, Guam for long range weather reconnaissance The unit flew weather reconnaissance missions for the Far East Air Forces during the early postwar years, inactivating in October 1947.

=== Korean War ===
It was reactivated in 1951 at Andersen Air Force Base, Guam. The squadron resumed its weather reconnaissance mission with WB-29s; upgrading to Boeing WB-50D Superfortresses in 1955. It often flew hazardous reconnaissance missions into tropical storms and typhoons to obtain accurate meteorological information. It was inactivated in 1960 due to budget reductions.

The squadron was reactivated in 1960 with a mixture of WB-50s, Boeing WB-47 Stratojets and Lockheed C-130 Hercules and resumed its typhoon hunting mission. The squadron was the last operator of the WB-50D Superfortress, retiring the last aircraft in 1965, when it operated C-130s.

=== Vietnam War ===
Perhaps its best accomplishment was during the Vietnam War when Operation Popeye (Project Popeye/Motorpool/Intermediary-Compatriot) was a US military cloud seeding operation (running from 20 March until 5 July 1972) to extend the monsoon season over Laos, specifically areas of the Ho Chi Minh Trail. Operating WC-130A aircraft flying out of Udorn Royal Thai Air Force Base, the operation seeded clouds with silver iodide, resulting in the targeted areas seeing an extension of the monsoon period an average of 30 to 45 days. As the continuous rainfall slowed down the truck traffic, it was considered relatively successful. The 54th Weather Reconnaissance Squadron carried out the operation to "make mud, not war."

=== Cold War ===
In 1974, a newly converted WC-130 (serial number 65-965) was sent to investigate Typhoon Bess. The crew departed Clark Air Base in the Philippines with the callsign Swan 38. Radio contact with the aircraft was lost on 12 October 1974, apparently as the aircraft was heading into the typhoon's eye to make a second position fix. There were no radio transmissions indicating an emergency on board, and search teams could not locate the aircraft or its crew. All six crew members were listed as killed in action.

In October of 1979, the 54th WRS flew approximately 60 missions into Super Typhoon Tip which is still the largest and the most intense tropical cyclone ever recorded. On October 12, 1979, a crew from the 54th recorded a barometric pressure of 870 milibars of mercury which is the lowest sea-level air pressure ever recorded.

It was inactivated in 1987, along with its associated weather unit, Detachment 3, 1st Weather Wing. The aircraft were dispersed to the remaining weather reconnaissance squadrons, the 53d Weather Reconnaissance Squadron and the Air Force Reserve unit, the 815th Weather Reconnaissance Squadron, both at Keesler Air Force Base, Mississippi.

== Lineage ==
- Constituted as the 654th Bombardment Squadron, Heavy (Reconnaissance, Special) on 17 July 1944

Activated on 9 August 1944
Redesignated 54th Reconnaissance Squadron, Long Range, Weather on 4 September 1945
Redesignated 54th Reconnaissance Squadron, Very Long Range, Weather on 27 November 1945
Inactivated on 15 October 1947

- Redesignated 54th Strategic Reconnaissance Squadron, Medium, Weather on 22 January 1951

Activated on 21 February 1951
Redesignated 54th Weather Reconnaissance Squadron on 15 February 1954
Discontinued and inactivated on 18 March 1960

- Organized 18 April 1962

Inactivated on 30 September 1987

=== Assignments ===
- 25th Bombardment Group, 9 August 1944
- Third Air Force, 8 September 1945
- 311th Reconnaissance Wing, 27 November 1945 (attached to the Twentieth Air Force), 8 December 1945 – 28 February 1946
- Military Air Transport Service, 13 March 1946
- Air Weather Service, 20 March 1946
- 43d Weather Wing, 1 August–15 October 1947
- 2143d Air Weather Wing, 21 February 1951
- 1st Weather Wing, 8 February 1954
- Department of the Air Force, 18 March 1960 (not organized)
- Military Air Transport Service, 8 February 1962
- 9th Weather Reconnaissance Group, 18 April 1962
- 9th Weather Reconnaissance Wing, 1 July 1965
- 41st Rescue and Weather Reconnaissance Wing, 1 September 1975 – 30 September 1987

=== Stations ===
- RAF Watton (AAF-376), England, 9 August 1944
- Drew Field, Florida, August 1945
- North Field, Guam, 27 November 1945
- Buckley Field, Colorado, 20 March 1946
- Langley Field, Virginia, 2 June 1946
- Morrison Field, Florida, 21 Jul 1946-30 Jun 1947
- McClellan Field, California, 1 July 1947
- Fairfield-Suisun Army Air Base, California, 31 July 1947
- North Army Air Base, Guam, 2 August–15 October 1947
- Andersen Air Force Base, Guam, 21 February 1951 – 18 March 1960
- Andersen Air Force Base, Guam, 8 February 1962 – 30 September 1987

=== Aircraft ===
- North American B-25 Mitchell, 1944
- De Havilland Mosquito PR Mk. XVI, 1944-1945
- Martin B-26 Marauder, 1944-1945
- Lockheed P-38 Lightning, 1944-1945
- Boeing B-29 Superfortress, 1946-1947; 1951-1956
- Boeing WB-29 Superfortress, 1946-1947; 1951-1956
- Douglas C-47 Skytrain, 1946-1947
- Douglas C-54 Skymaster, 1951-1960
- Boeing C-97 Stratofreighter, 1952-1953
- Boeing TB-50 Superfortress, 1955; 1955-1960
- Boeing WB-50 Superfortress, 1955; 1955-1960
- Boeing WB-47 Stratojet, 1962-1965
- Lockheed C-130 Hercules, 1962-1965
- Lockheed WC-130, 1965-1987

=== Awards and campaigns ===
Award streamer	Award	Dates	Notes
	Air Force Outstanding Unit Award	March 1956-October 1956	54th Weather Reconnaissance Squadron
	Air Force Outstanding Unit Award	1 July 1967-30 June 1968	54th Weather Reconnaissance Squadron
	Air Force Outstanding Unit Award	1 January 1971-31 December 1971	54th Weather Reconnaissance Squadron
	Air Force Outstanding Unit Award	1 January 1975-31 May 1976	54th Weather Reconnaissance Squadron
	Air Force Outstanding Unit Award	1 September 1975-1 May 1977	54th Weather Reconnaissance Squadron
	Air Force Outstanding Unit Award	16 July 1977-16 July 1979	54th Weather Reconnaissance Squadron

Campaign Streamer	Campaign	Dates	Notes
	Air Combat, EAME Theater	9 August 1944–11 May 1945	654th Bombardment Squadron
	Northern France	9 August 1944–14 September 1944	654th Bombardment Squadron
	Rhineland	15 September 1944–21 March 1945	654th Bombardment Squadron
	Ardennes-Alsace	16 December 1944–25 January 1945	654th Bombardment Squadron
	Central Europe	9 August 1944–21 May 1945	654th Bombardment Squadron
	Streamer without inscription	27 November 1945-2 March 1946	54th Reconnaissance Squadron
	Streamer without inscription	21 February 1951–27 July 1953	54th Strategic Reconnaissance Squadron
