= Weather reconnaissance =

Collection of weather data from otherwise inacessible areas

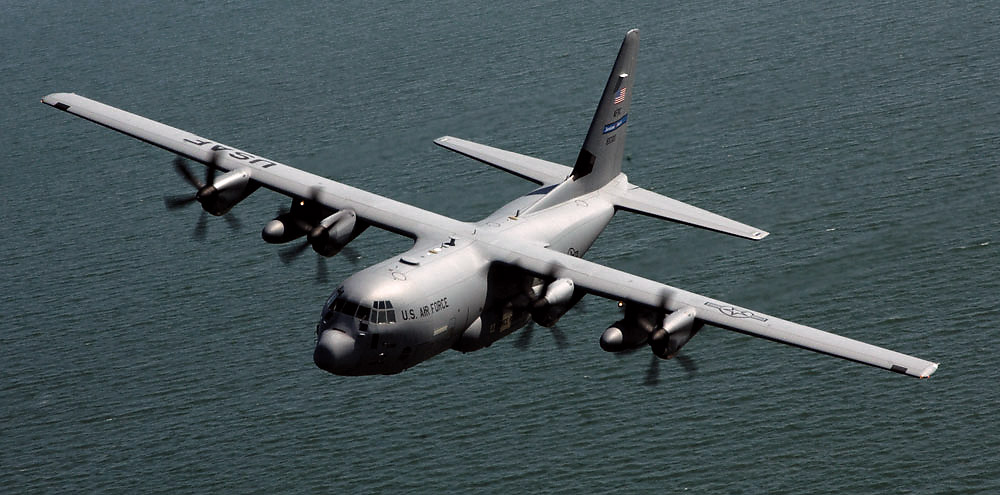
A WC-130 Weatherbird hurricane hunter

Weather reconnaissance is the acquisition of weather data used for research and planning. Typically the term reconnaissance refers to observing weather from the air, as opposed to the ground.

== Methods ==
=== Aircraft ===
Helicopters are not built to withstand the severe turbulence encountered in hurricane rainbands and eye walls. One reason is that a helicopter receives all of its lift from its rotating blades, and they are most likely to break off in hurricane conditions.

The Lockheed C-130 Hercules is used as a weather reconnaissance aircraft, with 5 different versions being used. The current version is the Lockheed C-130J.

The Lockheed WC-130J aircraft is an aircraft for weather reconnaissance. It flies directly into the hurricane, typically penetrating the hurricane's eye several times per mission at altitudes between 500 feet (150 m) and 10,000 feet (3,000 m). The 53rd WRS Hurricane Hunters operate ten WC-130J aircraft for weather reconnaissance.

The WP-3D Orion aircraft flown by the NOAA Hurricane Hunters are heavily instrumented flying laboratories specifically modified to take atmospheric and radar measurements within tropical cyclones and winter storms.

The NOAA Gulfstream IV high altitude jet conducts hurricane surveillance flying upwards of 4,000 miles (6,400 km) each flight to document upper and lower level winds that affect the movement of tropical cyclones. The hurricane models (computer models predicting hurricane tracks and intensity) mainly utilize NOAA G-IV dropwindsonde data that are collected both day and night in storms affecting the United States.

Other aircraft have been used to investigate hurricanes, including an instrumented Lockheed U-2 that was flown in Hurricane Ginny during the 1963 Atlantic hurricane season.

Past aircraft used were the A-20 Havoc, 1944; B-24, 1944–1945; B-17, 1945–1947; B-25, 1946–1947; B-29, 1946–1947. WB-29, 1951–1956; WB-50, 1956–1963; WB-47, 1963–1969; WC-121N 1954-1973; WC-130A, B, E, H, 1965-2005.

=== Watercraft ===
Watercraft deployed for use as weather ships have fallen out of favor due to their high operating cost. Unmanned weather buoys replaced weather ships when they became prohibitively expensive. Since the 1970s, their role has been largely superseded by weather buoys by design. Across the northern Atlantic, the number of weather ships dwindled over the years. The original nine ships in the region had fallen to eight by the 1970s. In 1974, the Coast Guard announced plans to terminate the United States stations, and, in 1977, the last United States weather ship was replaced by a newly developed weather buoy.

By 1983, data was still being collected by ships "M" ("Mike"), "R" ("Romeo"), "C" ("Charlie"), and L ("Lima"), Because of high operating costs and budget issues, weather ship "R" was recalled from the Bay of Biscay before the deployment of a weather buoy for the region. This recall was blamed for the minimal warning given in advance of the Great Storm of 1987. The last weather ship was Polarfront, known as weather station "M" at 66°N, 02°E, run by the Norwegian Meteorological Institute. Polarfront' was put out of operation 1 January 2010. Despite the loss of designated weather ships, weather observations from ships continue from a fleet of voluntary merchant vessels in routine commercial operation, which have increased in number over the decades.

== Applications ==
=== Spaceflight planning ===
Images from satellites provided a resource for forecasting weather for NASA Space Shuttle launches and landings. Meteorologists analyze images to predict regions of cloud formation and dissipation. Special attention is paid to low clouds and convective cloud particularly cumulonimbus incus clouds. Satellite imagery is used to ascertain cloud-top temperatures to analyze the potential for lightning. Certain types of imagery are valued for their ability to view fog and low clouds at night. Satellite imagery in the long term can help enhance the shuttle flight landing procedure.

Prior to shuttle launches or landings, pilots fly aircraft that provide cloud, wind, turbulence, visibility, and precipitation information. Aircraft are flown along the future flight path of the shuttle and observations are noted. This complements radar and satellite data and only provides information that is useful for short-term (up to four hours before launch or landing) but not long-term forecasting. Aerial reconnaissance often provides a more accurate assessment of weather conditions than radar or satellite imagery.

Weather reconnaissance is also provided by weather balloons.

== See also ==
- Convective storm detection
- Tropical cyclone observation
- Environmental monitoring
