= Lockheed WC-130 =

Weather aircraft series by Lockheed

WC-130
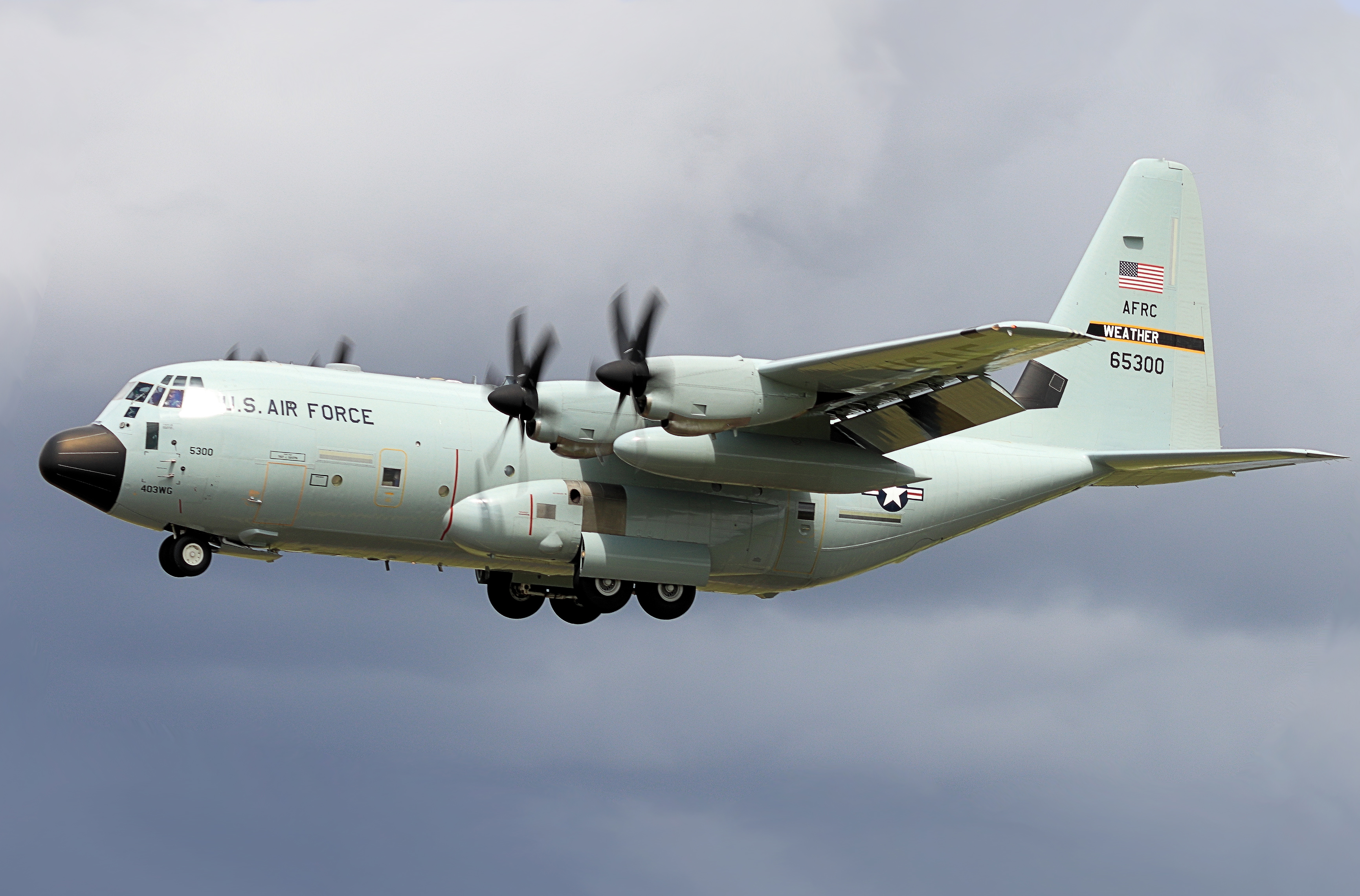
- WC-130J Hercules, 2023

General information
- Type: Weather reconnaissance
- Manufacturer: Lockheed; Lockheed Martin
- Status: Active
- Primary user: United States Air Force

History
- Introduction date: 1962
- Developed from: C-130 Hercules; C-130J Super Hercules

The Lockheed WC-130 is a high-wing, medium-range aircraft used for weather reconnaissance missions by the United States Air Force. The aircraft is a modified version of the C-130 Hercules transport configured with specialized weather instrumentation including a dropsonde deployment/receiver system and crewed by a meteorologist for penetration of tropical cyclones and winter storms to obtain data on movement, size and intensity.

The USAF's Air Weather Service (AWS) received its first C-130 Hercules in 1962 to conduct air sampling missions in the wake of a resumption of atmospheric weapons testing by the Soviet Union in September 1961. The Air Force was then in the process of replacing its fleet of WB-50 weather reconnaissance aircraft with WB-47E jets but by 1965 the AWS had decided it would better served by the WC-130 in the manned weather reconnaissance role. Since that year the Air Force and Air Force Reserve have operated a total of 50 WC-130s in five variants. The WC-130J Weatherbird is the current weather data collection platform for the 53rd Weather Reconnaissance Squadron.

Only one WC-130 has been lost during operational missions, H-model 65-0965, on 12 October 1974, flying in Typhoon Bess northeast of The Philippines. A former weather recon aircraft, H-model 65-0968, was lost on 2 May 2018 while serving with the Puerto Rico Air National Guard on its final ferry flight to retirement. Two WC-130B models were lost to crashes after being sold to international customers, and another operational WC-130B aircraft was destroyed on the ground by a hurricane.

== Development ==
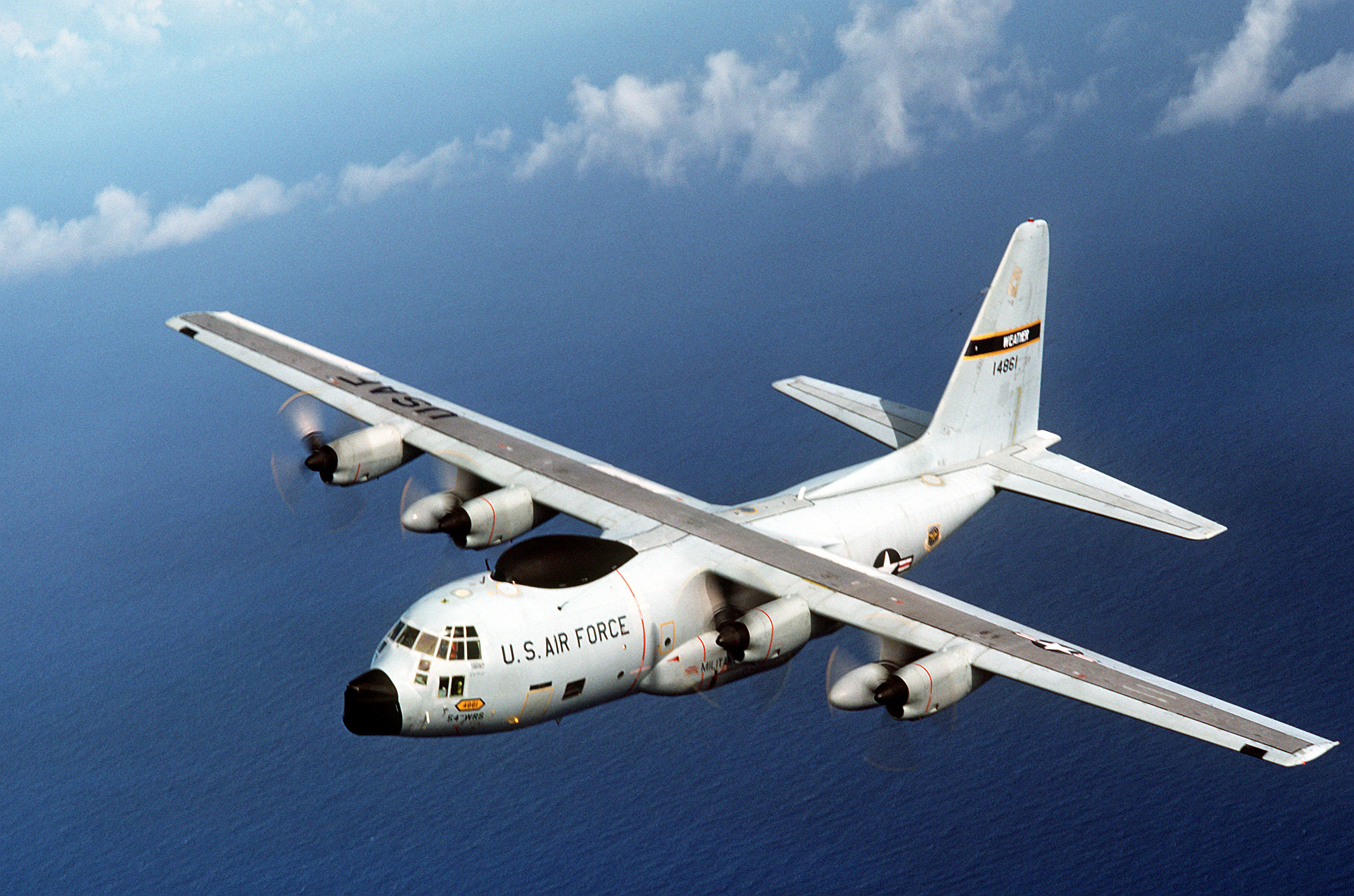
A WC-130H-LM from the 54th Weather Reconnaissance Squadron

In 1954 the Air Weather Service (AWS) replaced its WB-29 Superfortresses as its primary weather reconnaissance platform with a fleet of WB-50Ds deployed in seven squadrons. Between 1956 and 1960 six WB-50 accidents resulted in the loss of an entire crew and caused the deaths of 66 crew members; metal fatigue and other structural problems with the type was to end its service by 1965. The C-130 Hercules was desired by the AWS as the best alternative but budgetary limitations prevented the procurement of new aircraft for the mission. Headquarters Air Force had always considered aerial weather reconnaissance an expendable luxury when budget cuts were necessary or when funds were needed for expensive programs. In 1958 its desire to field a large ICBM deterrent force resulted in the shutdown of two AWS squadrons, followed by three more in March 1960. The problems with the WB-50, brought to a head in May 1960 by fuel leaks that grounded the entire 66-plane fleet, accelerated the process, which scheduled a complete phaseout by 1963. AWS fought against the decision, however, and the proposed permanent shutdown of AWS's flying mission alarmed high-level operational commanders worldwide, including the admiral commanding the United States Pacific Command. The commander of the Strategic Air Command, General Thomas S. Power, recommended that the WB-50s be replaced by B-47s that were being phased out by SAC, and when Gen. Curtis E. LeMay gave his support for the proposal, modification of 34 WB-47Es in 1963 for the AWS was approved and the re-activation of three discontinued weather recon squadrons scheduled for 1962.

In the meantime a bilateral moratorium with the Soviet Union on the atmospheric testing of nuclear weapons was starting its third year when a suggestion was made that the classified air sampling program monitoring the moratorium and being conducted by at least five USAF commands (Note: The five commands were SAC, Pacific Air Forces, Air Defense Command, Air Research and Development Command, and Military Air Transport Service.) be consolidated under a single manager and agency. AWS lobbied for the mission and submitted a plan in February 1961 naming itself the single manager. LeMay, now Air Force Chief of Staff, approved the plan on 31 August 1961; the next day the Soviet Union resumed nuclear testing. Headquarters Air Force authorized the acquisition of five new C-130Bs factory-configured for the sampling mission to be delivered in April 1962 when AWS would become the air sampling single-manager. These became the first weather-mission C-130 aircraft.

After the five C-130Bs became operational with AWS, conversions of six C-130Es followed in 1965 but as weather platforms. A dropsonde system was installed in all the C-130Bs and the designation of all C-130 weather variants was permanently changed to "WC-130" on 25 August 1965. Three WC-130As were created in Southeast Asia in 1967 and 11 more WC-130Bs were added in 1970 to replace the WB-47s, which had been abruptly retired from service in September 1969. (Note: The WB-47s had never been popular in their weather reconnaissance role, primarily because their Bendix-Friez data processing and communications system had not been fully tested and rarely worked, and were far from optimal since they were forbidden for structural reasons from penetrating tropical cyclones. General John D. Ryan, a career SAC officer and PACAF commander in 1967, was highly critical of the WB-47s and demanded they be retired. He backed down when confronted with their necessity as "weather scouts" for his Operation Arc Light missions in Vietnam, but one of his first actions when he was appointed Air Force Chief of Staff in August 1969 was to order their immediate retirement. (Fuller 359)) The first of 15 WC-130Hs was converted in 1973 from rescue command and control aircraft (that had themselves been modified from C-130Es). Service life of some of these variants over-lapped as they operated with the 53rd, 54th, 55th and 56th Weather Reconnaissance Squadrons. The -E and -H models have had the greatest longevity in service, 28 and 32 years respectively. Of the seven original weather reconnaissance squadrons, four of which received the WC-130 at some point, only the 53d WRS remains active, now assigned to the Air Force Reserve Command (AFRC).

The WC-130J model, introduced in 1999, is currently the weather reconnaissance platform for the 53rd WRS, part of the 403rd Wing of the Air Force Reserve Command at Keesler AFB, Mississippi. Many of the WC-130s replaced in the weather reconnaissance mission were subsequently redistributed after de-modification to other AFRC and Air National Guard wings for use again in their original tactical airlift role or as training aircraft, while others were sold to foreign air forces.

== Mission ==
The WC-130 provides vital tropical cyclone forecasting information and is the primary weather data collector for the National Hurricane Center, supplemented by the National Oceanographic and Atmospheric Administration's WP-3D Orion. They penetrate tropical cyclones and hurricanes at altitudes ranging from 500 to 10,000 feet (150 to 3,050 m) above the ocean surface depending upon the intensity of the storm. The most important function of these reconnaissance aircraft is to collect high-density, high-accuracy weather data from within the storm's environment. This includes penetration of the center or hurricane eye of the storm. This vital information is instantly relayed by satellite to the National Hurricane Center to aid in the accurate forecasting of hurricane movement and intensity.

== Variants and operational history ==
The Lockheed C-130 has been operated as a Weather Reconnaissance aircraft in the following sub-types:

=== WC-130B (1962–1973) ===
Five new C-130Bs (Note: The first group of B-models were AF serial numbers 62-3492 through -3496.) factory-configured for air sampling were delivered to the 55th Weather Reconnaissance Squadron at McClellan Air Force Base, California, in 1962. After operational testing and evaluation, three were distributed to the 54th, 56th, and 57th WRS and the 55th deployed one of its remaining two to Eielson Air Force Base, Alaska. In 1965 all had dropsonde systems (Note: The system then in use consisted of the AN/AMR-1 Radiosonde Receptor manufactured by Landers, Frary and Clark, and the Bendix AN/AMT-6 dropsonde.) installed at the Warner Robins Air Materiel Area (WRAMA) and were transferred to the 53rd WRS at Ramey Air Force Base, Puerto Rico, for use in the Hurricane Hunter mission. The first of thousands of such missions for the just-designated WC-130 was flown on 27 August 1965 into the eye of Hurricane Betsy, the most destructive hurricane in recorded history to that time.

In the aftermath of Hurricane Camille in August 1969 and the simultaneous shutdown of the WB-47 program, funds were appropriated to fund Project Seek Cloud, an upgrade of tropical storm reconnaissance capability by an increase in C-130 platforms and an upgrade in meteorological equipment. 12 additional C-130B transports (Note: The second batch of veteran C-130Bs acquired were s/n's 58-0725, -0726, -0729, 0-731, -0733, -0734, -0740, -0741, -0742, -0747, -0752, and -0758.) were obtained from Pacific Air Forces and modified in 1970–1971 with the new equipment suite. (Note: The Seek Cloud suite consisted of an AN/APN-42 Radar Altimeter, AN/AMQ-28 Rosemount Total Temperature System, and AN/AMQ-19 Dropsonde receiver and control panel previously mounted in retired WB-47s; an AN/AMQ-29 Dropsonde Data Recording System; a Hewlett-Packard 9100B Desktop Programmable Calculator; an AN/AMQ-34 Cambridge Optical Dewpoint Hygrometer; a Barnes Engineering PRT-5 Infrared Sea-Surface Temperature System; three strip chart recorders (for recording wind speed and direction data, ambient dew point, sea-surface temperature, pressure altitude and radar altitude); and a AN/AMQ-31 Dropsonde Dispenser and AN/AMT-13 Radiosonde. All but the dropsonde dispenser were installed with their controllers in a new console on the flight deck.) One was soon transferred to the National Oceanic and Atmospheric Administration (NOAA) (Note: 58-0731 was re-numbered with civil registration N8037 and nicknamed NOAA's Ark. It served as a hurricane research aircraft from 1970 to 1981.) but the other 11 went into military service, three to the 54th to replace the WC-130As and the rest to the 53rd, which had transferred four of its five original B-models to other squadrons after receiving Seek Cloud retrofits. Efforts to develop forward-looking and side-looking weather radars were unsuccessful. The second batch of C-130Bs were in service only a few years before all were de-modified and turned over to the reserve forces.

The WC-130Bs were powered by four Allison T56-A-7A turboprop engines rated at 4,050 shaft horsepower (3,020 kW), had a cruising speed of 350 knots (400 mph; 650 km/h), a radius of action of 1,200 miles (1,000 nmi; 1,900 km) with a payload of 25,000 pounds (11,000 kg), and a service ceiling of 30,000 feet (9,144 m).

=== WC-130E (1965–1993) ===
In 1965 the Air Force procured six E-model variants to replace six WB-47Es in the 54th Weather Reconnaissance Squadron at Anderson Air Force Base, Guam. Three veteran airlifters were transferred from the Tactical Air Command (TAC) and three obtained new. (Note: The six E-models were serial numbers 61-2360, 61-2365, 61-2366 and 64-0552 through -0554.) All were modified with the AMT-1 dropsonde system and assigned to the 54th WRS, where they remained until 1972. From then to 1987, when they were assigned permanently to the 53d WRS, the E-models were assigned to the operational demands of all the operational weather reconnaissance squadrons. In 1989 they were upgraded with the Improved Weather Reconnaissance System ("I-Wars") utilizing the Omega Navigation System (Note: "I-Wars" consists of three semi-independent sub-systems: the Atmospheric Distributed Data System (ADDS) which records and computes flight level meteorological data from various angle-of-attack probes, the radar altimeter, the pressure altimeter, ambient temperature and dewpoint sensors, and navigation data; the Dropsonde Windfinding System (DWS) which processes temperature, pressure, humidity, wind speed and direction data received from a dropsonde; and the Satellite Communication system (SATCOM). The ADDS generates measurements in the horizontal aspect ("horizontal data"), the DWS in the vertical ("vertical data"), and the SATCOM provides immediate direct transfer of the data to the user.) previously installed in WC-130H model and remained in regular operational service until retired in 1993.

=== WC-130A (1967–1970) ===
Three C-130A transports (Note: The three A-models were serial numbers 56-519, 56-522 and 56-537) were obtained from TAC in 1966 during the Vietnam War to conduct Operation Popeye, a rain-making operation in Southeast Asia. In early 1967 they were modified for an additional weather reconnaissance mission by installation of the AMT-1 dropsonde system. Two were based for the dual missions on a rotational basis at Udorn Royal Thai Air Force Base, Thailand, with a third at Anderson AFB for maintenance and crew changes. Missions were flown by crews of the 54th WRS and included synoptic weather reconnaissance to all areas of SEA. All three reverted to C-130A standard in 1971 after their replacement by upgraded models. (Note: 56-519 was given to the South Vietnamese air force and was captured at Tan Son Nhut Air Base by the North Vietnamese Army in 1975.)

=== WC-130H (1973–2005) ===
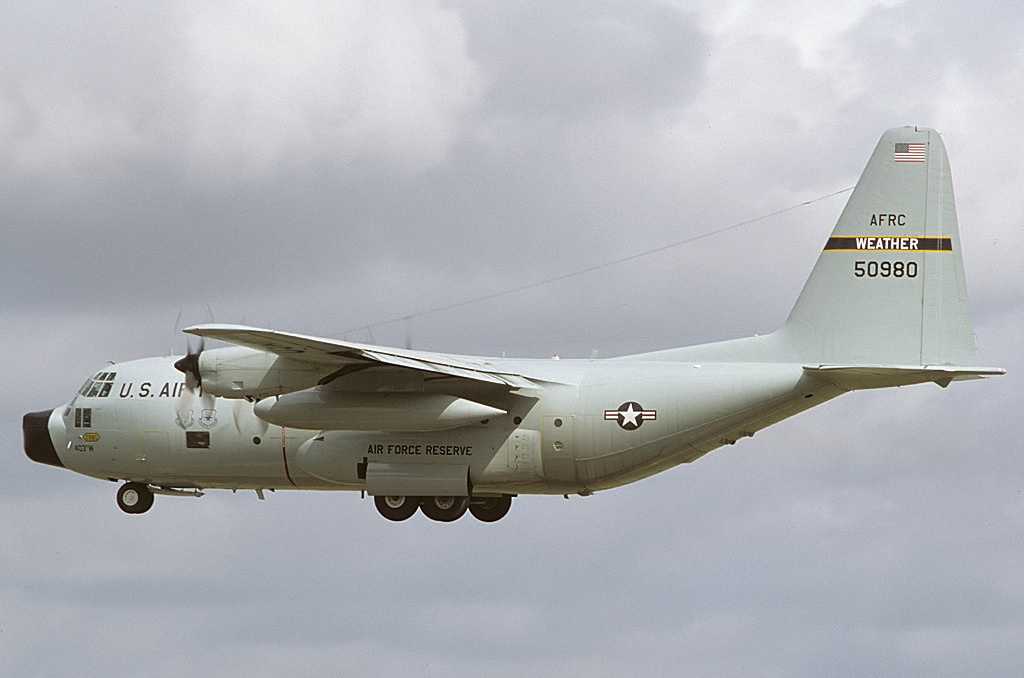
WC-130H Hercules in flight

With the drawdown of U.S. participation in the war in Southeast Asia, a number of extended-range HC-130H CROWN airborne controllers assigned to the Aerospace Rescue and Recovery Service (a sister agency of the Air Weather Service in the Military Airlift Command) became excess because of budgetary reductions. With Hurricane Camille still fresh in the minds of Congress and the American public and retention of the AWS flying mission still strong in MAC Headquarters, AWS proposed to Headquarters Air Force in March 1972 that its 16 WC-130Bs be replaced by a like number of the available HC-130Hs. The request was approved in December 1972 but altered a month later. AWS was ordered to retain three of the Bs and could give up the other 13 in return for 11 HC-130Hs. $4.5 million was budgeted for WRAMA to transfer the Seek Cloud equipment from the Bs to the newer Hs, and the changeover occurred between June 1973 and July 1974. Four additional HC-130Hs were converted in 1975.

A total of 15 HC-130H rescue Hercules were eventually modified with Seek Cloud equipment and designated WC-130H, (Note: These were all built as standard C-130E transports and reconfigured as HC-130H. Their serial numbers were 64-14861 and -14866; and 65-0963 through -0969, and -0972, -0976, -0977, -0980, -0984, and -0985.) replacing all 16 WC-130Bs in the weather reconnaissance squadrons. The WC-130H was equipped with the more powerful Allison T56-A-15 turboprop engines rated at 4,910 shaft horsepower (3,660 kW) and had wing-mounted fuel tanks that provided an additional 2,720 US gallons (2,260 imp gal; 10,300 L) of fuel, extending the WC-130H's radius of action at maximum cruise speed (230 knots (260 mph; 430 km/h) (KIAS), 350 knots (400 mph; 650 km/h) (KTAS)) to 2,250 nautical miles (2,590 mi; 4,170 km).

A contract was awarded Tracor Aerospace on 29 September 1987 to build and install 20 IWRS suites but two days later the 54th WRS was inactivated, (Note: Manned weather reconnaissance for the second time faced a campaign to put it out of business to gain its funding, this time from supporters of the Defense Meteorological Satellite Program (DMSP) and its TIROS weather satellites at Headquarters AF and in the AWS. A "selective" tropical storm reconnaissance program was instituted in the Western Pacific in 1971 after TIROS was introduced, reducing the number of sorties flown and their associated costs, while the U.S. Navy had withdrawn from the manned weather reconnaissance business entirely in 1975. As a consequence, the Joint Typhoon Warning Center had incrementally reduced its reliance on WC-130 data until by 1986, although unquestionably more reliable than that from the satellites, it nevertheless made up less than 10% of the data used by JTWC to plot typhoons. The 53d WRS at Keesler was also a target, but it still had strong "pork barrel" support in Congress for its continuation that the Guam-based unit did not have. (Fuller 363–364, 370)) leaving only ten WC-130s in service, seven with the 53d WRS and three in the Air Force Reserve. Even so, the IWRS system went operational in the WC-130H in 1988 and remains standard equipment. (Note: In 1998 the original Omega Navigation Equipment for the DWS was replaced by the GPS-based Airborne Vertical Atmospheric Profiling System (AVAPS).)

Manned weather reconnaissance continued to be reduced when AWS finally divested itself of its flying mission in 1991 by inactivating the 53d WRS and transferring both the mission and its few remaining aircraft assets to the Air Force Reserve Command (AFRC). But the devastation wrought by Hurricane Andrew in 1992 again demonstrated the need for "hurricane hunting" and state-of-the-art equipment to accomplish it, and the 53d was resurrected as a full-time unit of AFRC in 1993. The WC-130s were transferred back to it but the H-models were showing their age and between 1999 and 2005 all were replaced by the new, technologically advanced J-variant.

=== WC-130J (1999–present) ===
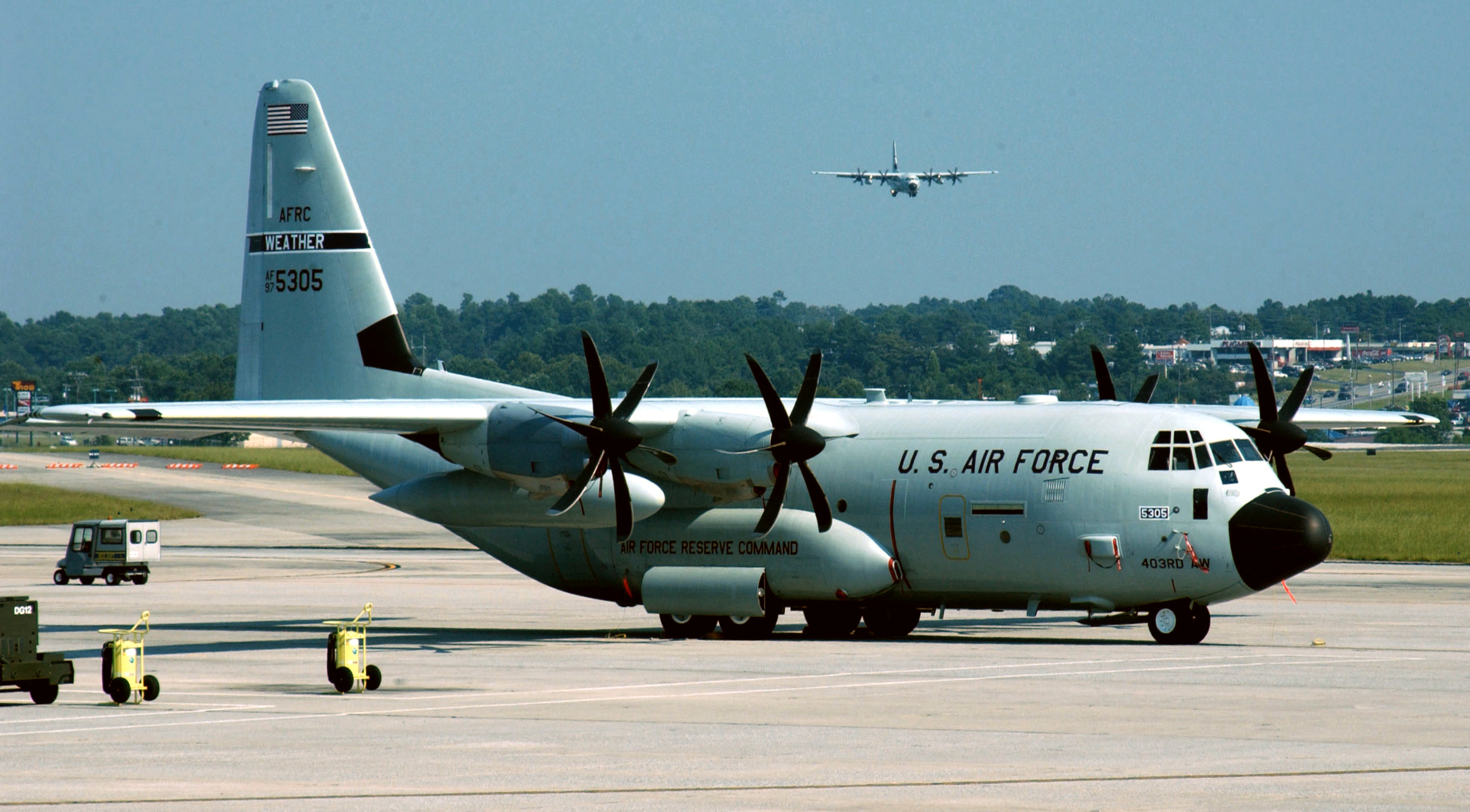
WC-130J on the ramp at Dobbins Air Reserve Base during Hurricane Katrina, 2005. A second WC-130J is landing in the background. The 53d WRS was displaced by severe storm damage to its base at Keesler AFB, Mississippi.

The WC-130J was the first variant obtained new from the factory since 1965. Ten were procured (Note: AF s/n 96-5300 through −5302, 97–5303 through −5306, 98–5307 and −5308, and 99-5309.) and assigned to the 53d WRS, now the only manned weather reconnaissance unit in the Department of Defense. The new model encountered teething problems (Note: These were primarily damage to its composite material 6-bladed propellers from hail and ice and a lack of sensitivity in its color radar images.) that delayed its Initial Operational Capability until just before the 2005 Atlantic hurricane season. Conversion of the Lockheed Martin C-130J Super Hercules greatly enhanced the capability and safety of the WC-130 in its penetration of tropical cyclones on critical "fix" missions.

The WC-130J carries a minimum crew of five: pilot/aircraft commander, co-pilot, combat systems officer, aerial reconnaissance weather officer and weather reconnaissance loadmaster. The 53d WRS maintains twenty air crews (ten full-time and ten part-time) to meet its capabilities obligations in support of requirements for the National Hurricane Operations Plan of five sorties per day from Keesler AFB and two from deployed locations. Weather data instrumentation and the dropsonde delivery and recording systems are mounted in the aircraft on removable pallets at the front end of the cargo compartment, (Note: The ARWO station is mounted on the port side facing aft and the dropsonde operator's position on the starboard facing forward.) giving the aircraft a standard cargo mission capability also.

The aircraft is not equipped for aerial refueling, but with wing-mounted auxiliary fuel tanks is capable of staying aloft almost 18 hours at an optimum cruise speed of more than 300 mph (260 kn; 480 km/h). An average weather reconnaissance mission lasts 11 hours and covers almost 3,500 miles (3,000 nmi; 5,600 km). The crew collects and reports weather data as often as every minute.

The Aerial Reconnaissance Weather Officer operates the computerized weather reconnaissance equipment, generates the "horizontal data" measurements (also known as "Recco"), and acts as flight director inside the storm environment. The weather officer also evaluates other meteorological conditions such as turbulence, icing, visibility, cloud types and amounts, and ocean surface winds. The ARWO uses the equipment to determine the storm's center and analyze atmospheric conditions such as pressure, temperature, dew point and wind speed to create a Vortex Data Message sent to the National Hurricane Center.

A critical piece of weather equipment on board the WC-130J is the GPS Dropsonde Windfinding System, a cylindrically shaped instrument about 16 inches (41 cm) long and 3.5 inches (8.9 cm) in diameter and weighing approximately 2.5 pounds (1.1 kg). The dropsonde is equipped with a high frequency radio and other sensing devices and is released from the aircraft over water. As the instrument descends to the sea surface, it measures and relays to the aircraft a vertical atmospheric profile of the temperature, humidity and barometric pressure and wind data. The dropsonde is slowed and stabilized by a small parachute. Through use of the Advanced Vertical Atmospheric Profiling System (AVAPS), (Note: AVAPS is a self-contained system installed in two standard 19-inch racks that records current atmospheric conditions vertically below the WC-130J aircraft as a deployed sonde falls to the surface. AVAPS consists of expendable sondes, a Dropsonde Telemetry Chassis, high power computer, and a color monitor.) the Dropsonde System Operator generates the "vertical data" (also referred to as "Drops") needed by the NHC, receiving, analyzing and encoding the data for transmission by satellite.

Between May 2007 and February 2008, all ten WC-130J were equipped with the Stepped-Frequency Microwave Radiometer (SFMR or "Smurf"), which continuously measures the surface winds and rainfall rates below the aircraft, mounted in a radome on the right wing outboard of the number four engine.

The WC-130J provides data vital to tropical cyclone forecasting. The WC-130J usually penetrates hurricanes at an altitude of approximately 10,000 feet (3,000 m) to collect meteorological data in the vortex, or eye, of the storm. The aircraft normally flies a radius of about 100 miles (87 nmi; 160 km) from the vortex to collect detailed data about the structure of the tropical cyclone.

The information collected makes possible advance warning of hurricanes and increases the accuracy of hurricane predictions and warnings by as much as 30%. Collected data are relayed directly to the National Hurricane Center, in Miami, Fla., a Department of Commerce weather agency that tracks hurricanes and provides warning service in the Atlantic area.

== Accidents and incidents ==
- Swan 38 – On 12 October 1974, a newly modified WC-130H (65-0965) assigned to the United States Air Force's 54th Weather Reconnaissance Squadron and its six crew disappeared during Typhoon Bess. No trace of the aircraft or its crew has ever been found.

== Operators ==
The WC-130 are exclusively operated by the United States Air Force, especially by its Air Force Reserve Command. As of May 2014, 10 are in the USAF's inventory, all belonging to the reserve.

=== Current operators ===
United States

- United States Air Force
  - Air Force Reserve Command
    - 53rd Weather Reconnaissance Squadron

==== Former squadrons ====
- 54th Weather Reconnaissance Squadron (1965-1987)

== Specifications (WC-130J Weatherbird) ==
Data from 403rd Wing, USAF Reserve

General characteristics

- Crew: 5 (aircraft commander, pilot, combat systems officer, weather officer and loadmaster/dropsonde operator)
- Length: 97 ft 9 in (29.79 m)
- Wingspan: 132 ft 7 in (40.41 m)
- Height: 38 ft 10 in (11.84 m)
- Wing area: 1,745 sq ft (162.1 m^{2})
- Airfoil: root: NACA 64A318; tip: NACA 64A412
- Max takeoff weight: 155,000 lb (70,307 kg)
- Powerplant: 4 × Rolls-Royce AE 2100D3 turboprop engines, 4,637 shp (3,458 kW) each
- Propellers: 6-bladed Dowty R391 constant-speed fully-feathering reversible-pitch propellers

Performance

- Maximum speed: 362 kn (417 mph, 670 km/h) at 22,000 ft (6,706 m)
- Range: 1,600 nmi (1,800 mi, 3,000 km) with 35,000 lb (15,876 kg) payload
- Service ceiling: 28,000 ft (8,500 m) with 42,000 lb (19,051 kg) payload

== See also ==
- Hurricane Hunters
- Operation Christmas Drop

Related development

- Lockheed Martin C-130J Super Hercules
- Lockheed C-130 Hercules

Aircraft of comparable role, configuration, and era

- Lockheed WP-3D Orion

Related lists

- List of Lockheed aircraft
