= 1974 United States Air Force WC-130 disappearance =

1974 aircraft disappearance

Swan 38
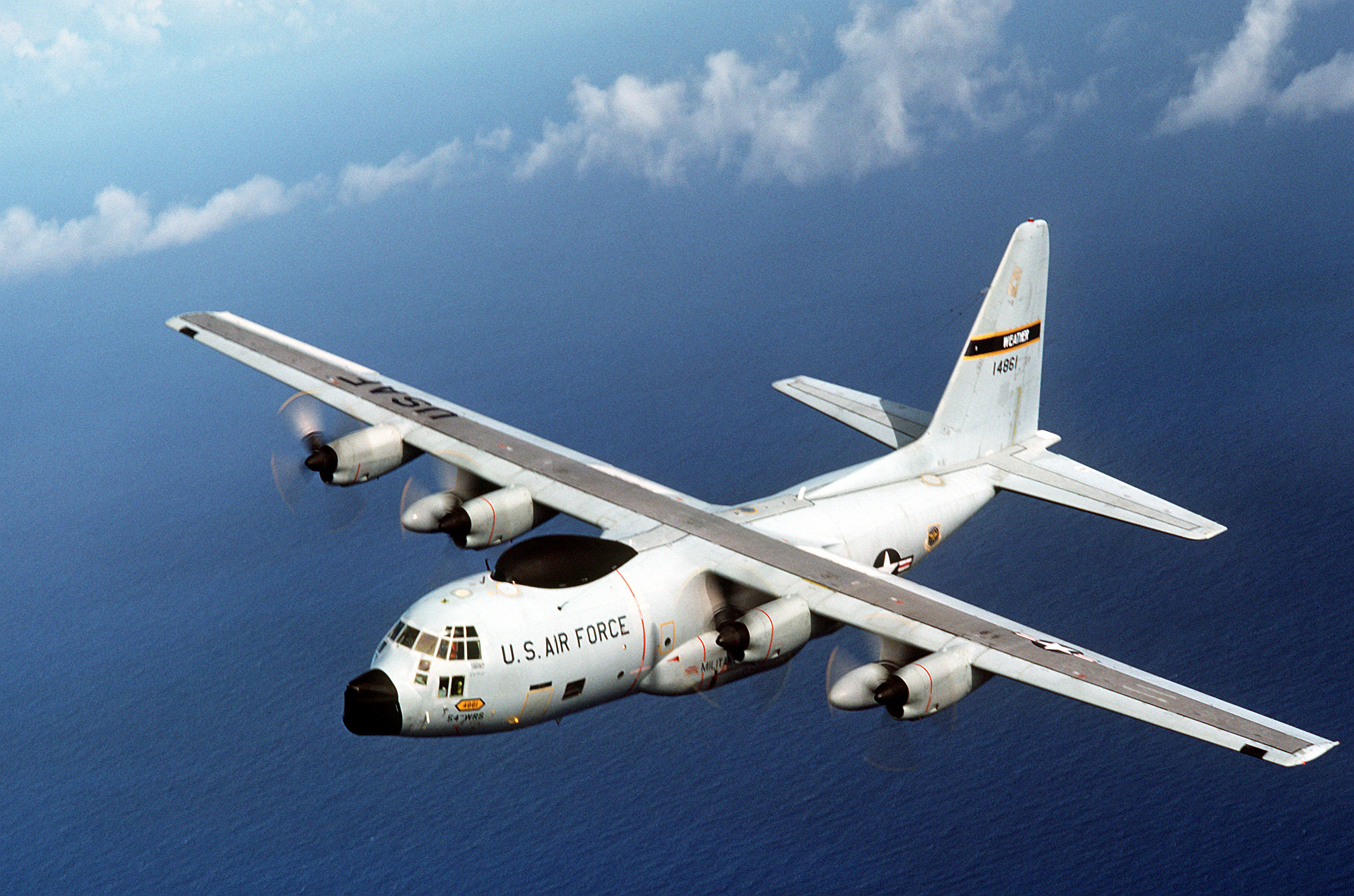
- A Lockheed WC-130H Weatherbird, of the 54th Weather reconnaissance Squadron, in flight over the Pacific Ocean

Disappearance
- Date: 12 October 1974
- Summary: Disappearance
- Site: South China Sea

Aircraft
- Aircraft type: Lockheed WC-130
- Operator: 54th Weather Reconnaissance Squadron, United States Air Force
- Registration: 65-0965
- Flight origin: Clark Air Base, Philippines
- Destination: Clark Air Base, Philippines
- Occupants: 6
- Crew: 6
- Fatalities: 6 (presumed)
- Survivors: 0 (presumed)

USAF WC-130 'Swan 38' was a Lockheed WC-130 aircraft tasked to investigate Typhoon Bess in 1974. It was lost during the mission, with the loss of its six crew.

== Task ==
In 1974, the newly converted Lockheed WC-130H (Air Force serial number 65-0965) was transferred to the 54th Weather Reconnaissance Squadron, the "Typhoon Chasers", at Andersen Air Force Base on Guam. The aircraft, using the call sign Swan 38, was sent to investigate Typhoon Bess after it passed over the Philippines and continued to the northwest. The crew departed Clark Air Base on the island of Luzon in the Philippines.

== Loss ==
After a successful first penetration of the typhoon, they were preparing for a second when contact was lost, the last contact being at about 2200.

There was no distress signal. Five aircraft and the USS White Plains (AFS-4) were involved in the search. While some debris was seen 400 miles (640 km) from Clark, there was no recorded verification of its identity.

All six crew members were listed as missing and presumed dead. The Swan 38 crew members were: Capt. Edward R. Bushnell, 1st Lt. Gary W. Crass, 1st Lt. Michael P. O'Brien, 1st Lt. Timothy J. Hoffman, Tech. Sgt. Kenneth G. Suhr, and Sgt. Detlef W. Ringler.

== Commemoration ==
In 2019, a scholarship was set up in remembrance of the lost crew by the Hurricane Hunters Association.
