= Joseph Duckworth =

Joseph B. Duckworth
- Born: September 8, 1902; Savannah, Georgia, U.S.
- Died: July 26, 1964 (aged 61); Battle Creek, Michigan, U.S.
- Burial place: Riverside Cemetery, Albion, Michigan, U.S.
- Military career
- Allegiance: United States
- Branch: United States Air Force
- Service years: 1927–1955
- Rank: Colonel
- Nickname: "Joe"
- Conflicts: World War II

Joseph B. Duckworth (September 8, 1902 – July 26, 1964) was a colonel in the United States Air Force, and was regarded as the "father" of modern instrument flight. He is also noted in record books as being the first person to fly through the eye of a hurricane.

== Early life ==
Duckworth was born in Savannah, Georgia, in 1902.

== Aviation career ==
Duckworth enlisted in the United States Army Air Corps as a Flying Cadet in 1927 and received his wings and reserve commission at Kelly Field, Texas, the following year. After graduation, he flew for Ford Motor Co., Curtiss-Wright Flying Service, and Eastern Air Lines. It was during this time that he developed his knowledge of instrument flight (obtaining a law degree from the University of Miami in the meantime).

In late 1940, Duckworth was called to active duty in the rank of a major and promoted to lieutenant colonel soon after the US joined World War II. He was shocked at the profound ignorance of instrument flying throughout the Air Corps, and appalled that the losses sustained from that type of ignorance were greater than losses due to actual combat. During the rest of the war, he introduced his knowledge of instrument flying at various flying schools, first at Columbus Army Flying School in Columbus, Mississippi, then at Bryan Air Base, and helped to standardize instrument flight instruction within the Air Corps.

Duckworth’s most notable single achievement occurred on July 27, 1943, when he flew an AT-6 single engine trainer into a small but strong hurricane in the Gulf of Mexico near Galveston, Texas, becoming the first person to safely fly through a hurricane.

After the war, he served as the head of the safety bureau of the Civil Aeronautics Board, retiring from the Air Force in 1955 after serving as base commander of Hickam AFB, Hawaii.

== Later life ==
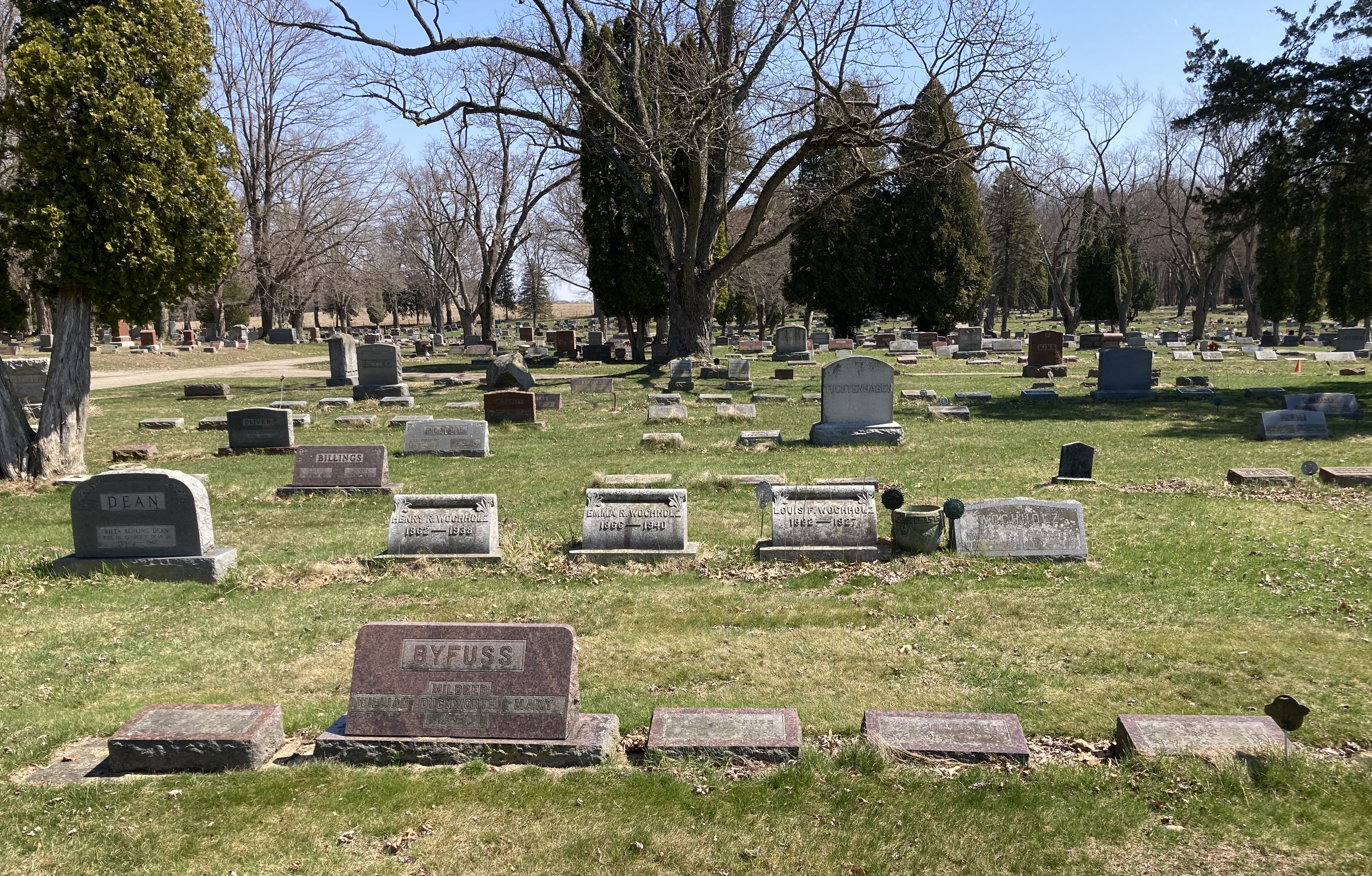
Duckworth's grave (rightmost front) at Riverside Cemetery

He died on July 26, 1964, in Battle Creek, Michigan, and was buried at Riverside Cemetery in Albion, Michigan. The Air Force presents the Col. Joseph B. Duckworth Instrument Award annually to the individual or unit making the greatest contribution to aerospace instrument flight.
