= Typhoon Bess (1974) =

Pacific typhoon in 1974

Typhoon Bess (Susang)
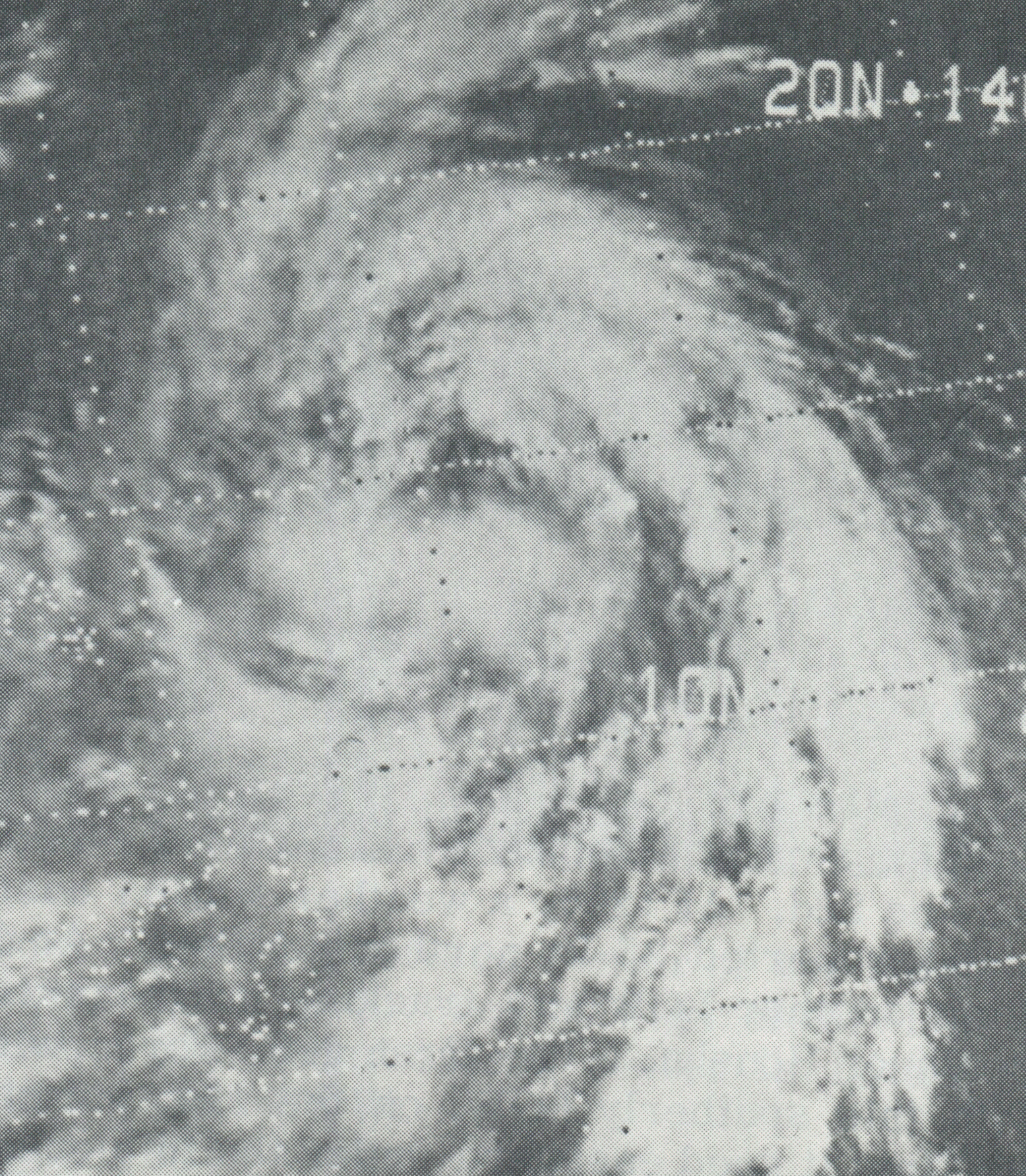
- Satellite image of Bess on October 8 displaying dual centers of circulation

Meteorological history
- Formed: October 8, 1974
- Dissipated: October 14, 1974

Typhoon
- 10-minute sustained (JMA)
- Lowest pressure: 975 hPa (mbar); 28.79 inHg

Category 1-equivalent typhoon
- 1-minute sustained (SSHWS/JTWC)
- Highest winds: 120 km/h (75 mph)
- Lowest pressure: 980 hPa (mbar); 28.94 inHg

Overall effects
- Fatalities: 32 total
- Missing: 3
- Damage: $9.2 million (1974 USD)
- Areas affected: Philippines, Hong Kong, Hainan Island, northern Vietnam
- IBTrACS
- Part of the 1974 Pacific typhoon season

Typhoon Bess, known in the Philippines as Typhoon Susang, was responsible for the disappearance of a United States Air Force weather reconnaissance aircraft. Developing out of a poorly organized system on October 8 to the east of the Philippines, Bess featured two centers of circulation. Initially the southern low was monitored; however, a low to the north soon became the dominant center. Tracking generally west-northwestward, the storm gradually intensified before striking northern Luzon as a minimal typhoon on October 11. Temporary weakening took place due to interaction with land. After moving back over water the following morning, Bess regained typhoon intensity. This was short-lived though, as conditions surrounding the cyclone soon caused it to weaken. Now moving due west, the weakening storm eventually struck Hainan Island as a tropical storm on October 12 before diminishing to a tropical depression. The depression briefly moved back over water before dissipating in northern Vietnam on October 14.

Bess produced heavy rains throughout the Philippines, especially in Luzon where 782.3 mm (30.80 in) was measured in Baguio. These rains triggered extensive flooding and landslides that killed 26 people and left 3 others missing. Many homes were destroyed and damage amounted to $9.2 million (1974 USD). On October 12, a reconnaissance plane, with a crew of six, investigating the periphery of the storm went missing. It is presumed that the entire crew was lost when the aircraft crashed off the coast of Luzon. Though the center remained offshore, strong winds and high tides also impacted Hong Kong, causing minor flooding.

== Meteorological history ==
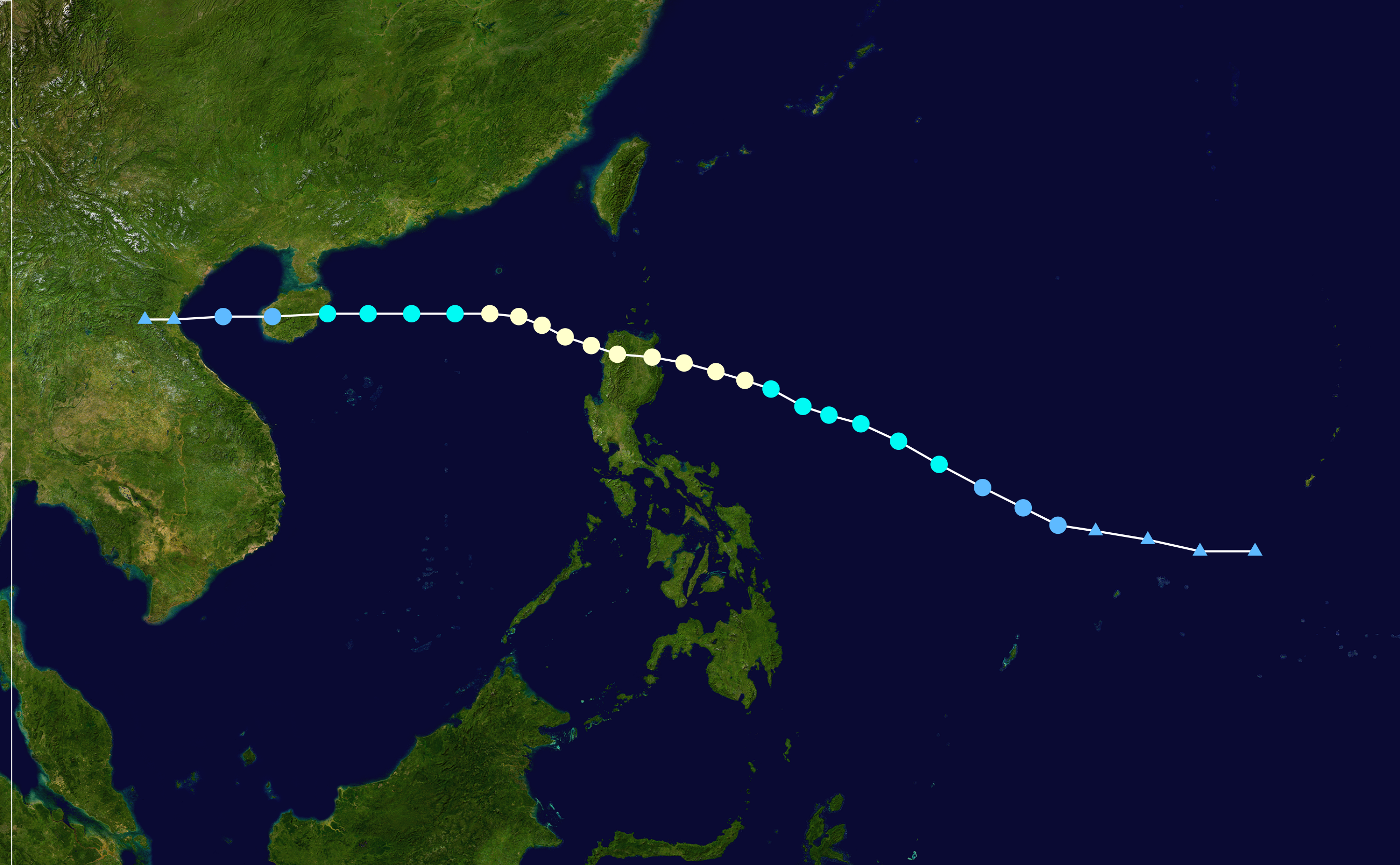
Map plotting the storm's track and intensity, according to the Saffir–Simpson scale Map key Saffir–Simpson scale Tropical depression (≤38 mph, ≤62 km/h) Tropical storm (39–73 mph, 63–118 km/h) Category 1 (74–95 mph, 119–153 km/h) Category 2 (96–110 mph, 154–177 km/h) Category 3 (111–129 mph, 178–208 km/h) Category 4 (130–156 mph, 209–251 km/h) Category 5 (≥157 mph, ≥252 km/h) Unknown Storm type Tropical cyclone Subtropical cyclone Extratropical cyclone, remnant low, tropical disturbance, or monsoon depression

On October 6, 1974, the Joint Typhoon Warning Center (JTWC) began monitoring a tropical disturbance several hundred miles southeast of Guam. Tracking quickly westward to west-northwestward in response to a strong subtropical ridge to the north, the system gradually organized, passing near Ulithi atoll on October 7. Accompanied by a broad monsoonal flow, the disturbance featured multiple centers of circulation. On October 8, it developed into a tropical depression and soon into a tropical storm, at which time it was assigned the name Bess. Early on October 9, an aircraft reconnaissance mission into Bess revealed that a new dominant center of circulation had developed to the north of the original low. The southern low soon dissipated as the northern one became a tropical storm. The northern system retained the name Bess and is considered the same storm by the JTWC.

After the northern circulation became the dominant center on October 9, a deepening trough in the westerlies caused a decrease in synoptic pressures, resulting in Bess' forward motion greatly decreasing. Maintaining a west-northwesterly track, strong outflow developed, especially to the southwest of the circulation. The storm eventually intensified into a typhoon on October 10 as it approached the northern Philippines. Due to the cyclone's proximity to the country, the Philippine Atmospheric, Geophysical and Astronomical Services Administration also monitored the storm and assigned it with the local name Susang. Later that day, Bess made landfall in northern Luzon, roughly 95 km (59 mi) south of Escarpada Point, with winds estimated at 120 km/h (75 mph). Though classified a minimal typhoon by the JTWC, the Hong Kong Royal Observatory reported that reconnaissance planes had recorded surface winds of 140 km/h (87 mph) before the system moved ashore. Inland, a barometric pressure of 976.9 mbar (hPa; 28.85 inHg) was recorded in Tuguegarao as the typhoon passed 55 km (34 mi) to the north.

Due to the interaction with the high terrain of northern Luzon, Bess temporarily weakened to a tropical storm before regaining typhoon strength over the South China Sea during the afternoon of October 11. As the storm emerged back over water, satellite images revealed a relatively large system with clouds spanning an area 485 km (301 mi) in diameter. Upon reintensifying, Bess turned due west in response to a dominating high-pressure area over Southern China. With a large difference in pressures between the two systems, a strong northeasterly flow developed between them. This resulted in gale-force winds occurring up to 400 km (250 mi) from Bess's center. During the evening of October 12, the combined effects of a winter monsoon and entrainment of cool, dry air from mainland China began to weaken the system. By the following morning, Bess had weakened to tropical storm as it passed 305 km (190 mi) south of Hong Kong. The system later struck Hainan Island with winds of 85 km/h (53 mph) before lessening to a tropical depression. The dissipating system emerged over the Gulf of Tonkin on October 14 and ultimately dissipated as it began moving ashore in northern Vietnam later that day.

== Impact ==
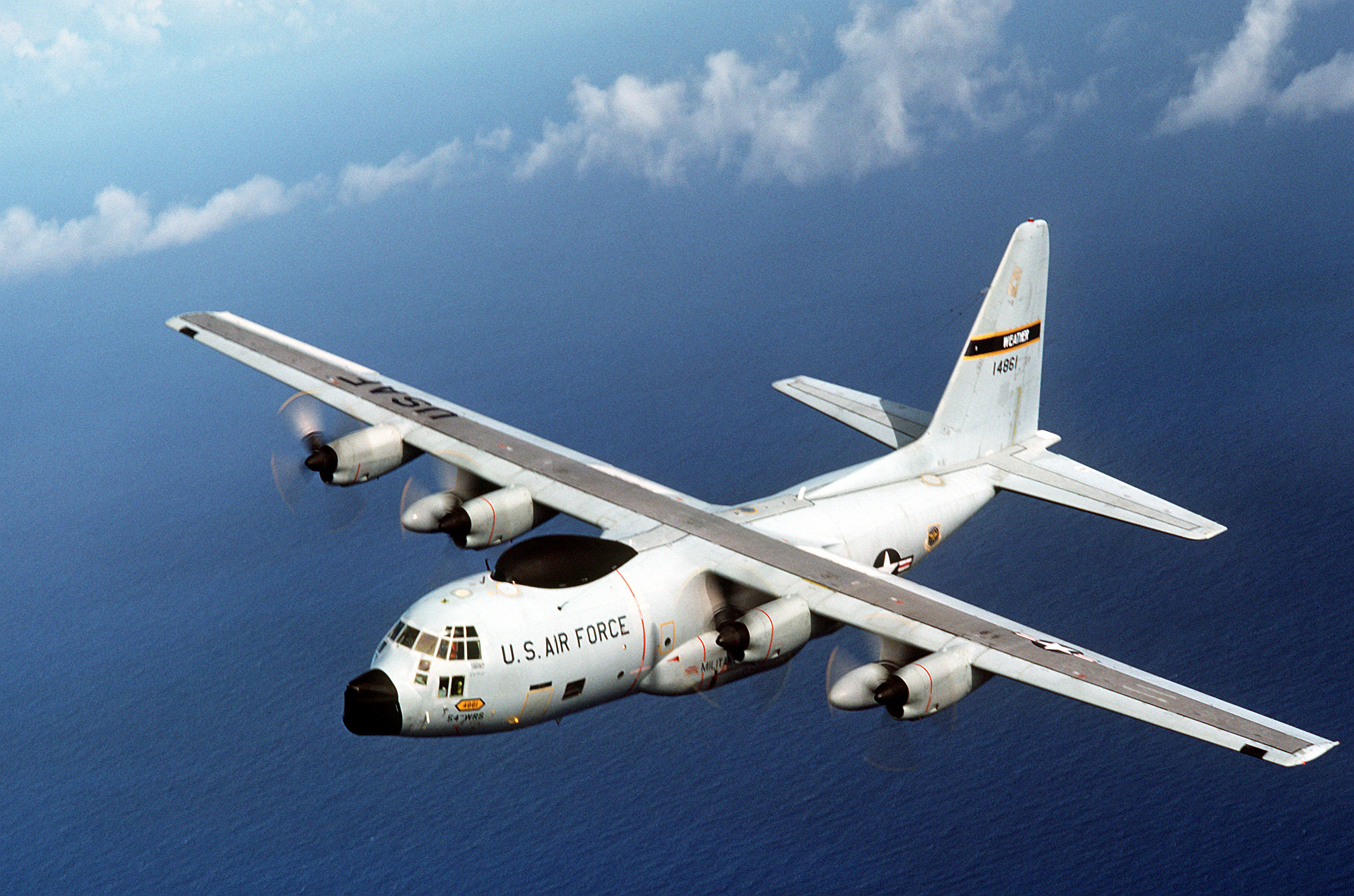
A WC-130H Hercules similar to the one that crashed over the South China Sea

Striking northern Luzon as a typhoon, Bess produced damaging winds and torrential rainfall across the region. Gusts peaked at 178 km/h (111 mph) in Aparri, Cagayan while Baguio experienced gusts of 150 km/h (93 mph). Communication across the region was greatly disrupted as numerous power lines and trees were downed. While much of the peninsula received 130 to 150 mm (5 to 6 in) of rain, a 24‑hour maxima of 782.3 mm (30.8 in) was reported in Baguio. The rainfall triggered widespread flash flooding and landslides, resulting in 26 fatalities and extensive damage. One death took place in Baguio after a girl was buried in a landslide. At least three other people were reported missing. In a town roughly 805 km (500 mi) south of Manila, a landslide destroyed eight homes and a school. Flood waters inundated four villages in the central Philippines. The storm affected a total of 35,562 people, of which about 4,000 became homeless. Total losses amounted to $9.2 million (1974 USD).

On October 11, a level one warning signal was raised for Hong Kong, indicating that a tropical cyclone was approaching the region. This was soon raised to level three as strong winds were expected to affect the area. Although the center of Bess passed roughly 305 km (190 mi) south of Hong Kong, the pressure gradient between the tropical storm and high pressure to the north resulted in strong winds across the region. On Pratas Island, Taiwan (ROC), winds of 50 knots and a sea-level pressure of 987.2 millibars were reported. In Hong Kong itself, winds reached 45 km/h (28 mph) and gusted to 85 km/h (53 mph). Gusts up to 113 km/h (70 mph) occurred on Tate's Cairn. In contrast to the unusually strong winds, Bess produced virtually no rainfall as it passed by, with only a trace of precipitation measured between October 11 and 14 in Hong Kong. Along the coast, abnormally high tides combined with storm surge flooded low-lying areas of the city. Tides at Tai Po Kau reached 3.6 m (12 ft) with a surge of 1.5 m (4.9 ft). Sea water leaked into the city's underground sewage system and caused minor flooding in the area's western district. Some property damage was reported.

While over the South China Sea on October 12, a United States Air Force WC-130H Hercules reconnaissance aircraft (call sign Swan 38), with a crew of six, went missing while collecting data on the cyclone. The plane took off from Clark Air Base during the night on October 12 and made its final contact six hours later roughly 95 km (59 mi) north of Manila. A rescue team of five Air Force aircraft and the USS White Plains was dispatched to look for survivors. Search and rescue missions for the crew only found pieces of debris, such as an aircraft survival radio, soundproofing material, and orange cushion-like material. All six crewmen were never found and are presumed dead. Following the incident, the 53d Weather Reconnaissance Squadron established the Swan 38 Memorial Scholarship for outstanding students in the 403d Wing.

== Retirement ==
Because of the damage and loss of life caused by the storm, the name Bess was retired and replaced with Bonnie. However, when the list of typhoon names was changed to incorporate male names in 1979, the name was re-introduced to the roster. Coincidentally, it was again retired in 1982 when a powerful storm named Bess caused extensive damage and loss of life in Japan.

== See also ==
- 1974 Pacific typhoon season
- Typhoons in the Philippines
