= 53rd Weather Reconnaissance Squadron =

53rd Weather Reconnaissance Squadron

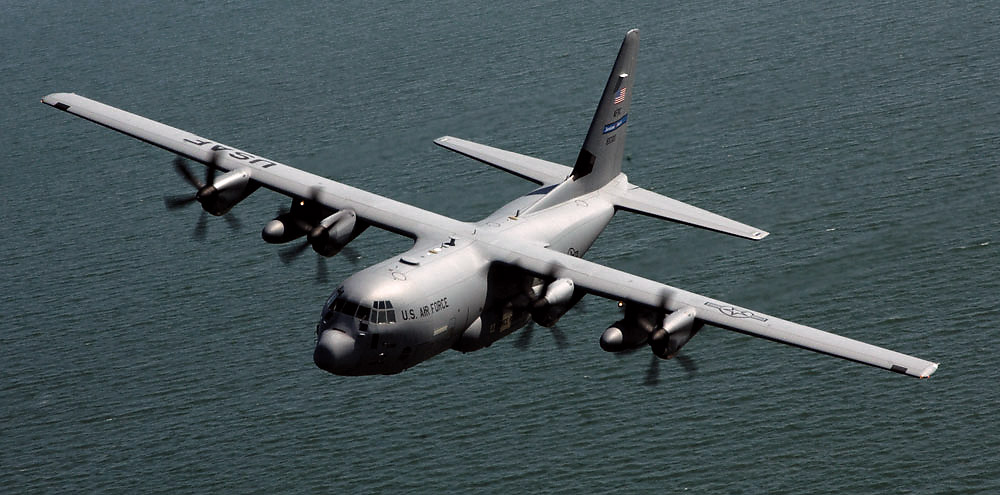
- WC-130J of the 53rd Squadron
- Active: 1944–1947; 1951–1960; 1962–1991; 1993–present
- Country: United States
- Branch: United States Air Force
- Type: Squadron
- Role: Tropical cyclone weather reconnaissance
- Size: 10 aircraft, 20 flight crews
- Part of: Air Force Reserve Command: Twenty-Second Air Force; 403rd Wing; 403rd Operations Group
- Garrison/HQ: Keesler Air Force Base, Mississippi
- Nickname: Hurricane Hunters
- Decorations: Meritorious Unit Commendation; Air Force Outstanding Unit Award

Insignia
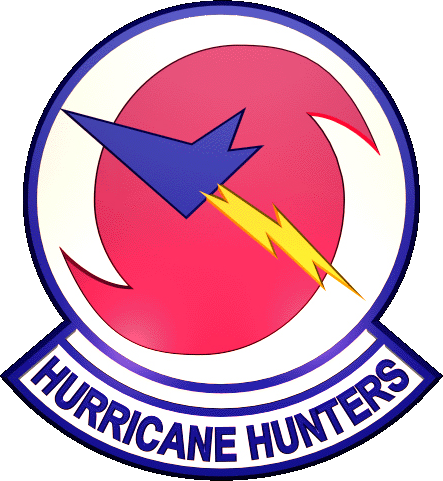
- 53rd Weather Reconnaissance Squadron emblem (1995) (Note: The emblem was personally modified by the Chief of Staff of the United States Air Force, but the changes were registered, but not approved formally. Robertson Factsheet, 53 Weather Reconnaissance Squadron (AFRC).)

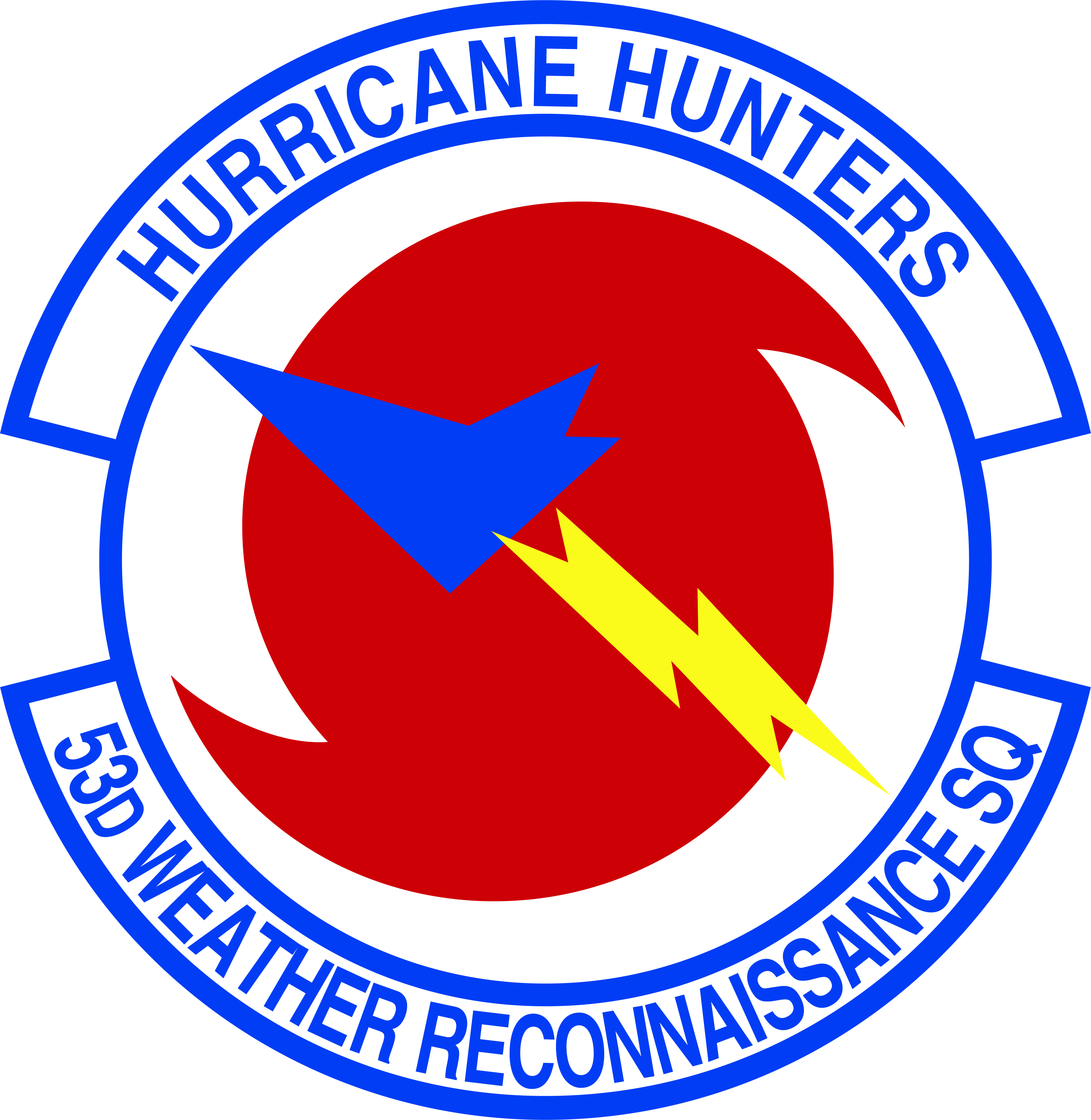
- 53rd Weather Reconnaissance Squadron emblem (Note: Aapproved 1 April 1963.)

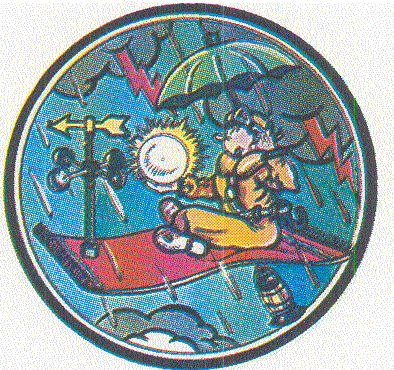
- 53rd Reconnaissance Squadron emblem (Note: Approved 15 November 1945.)

Aircraft flown
- Reconnaissance: WC-130J Hercules; WB-47E Stratojet; WB-50D Superfortress; WB-29A/B-29A Superfortress; RB-17/TB-17 Flying Fortress; B-25/WB-25D Mitchell

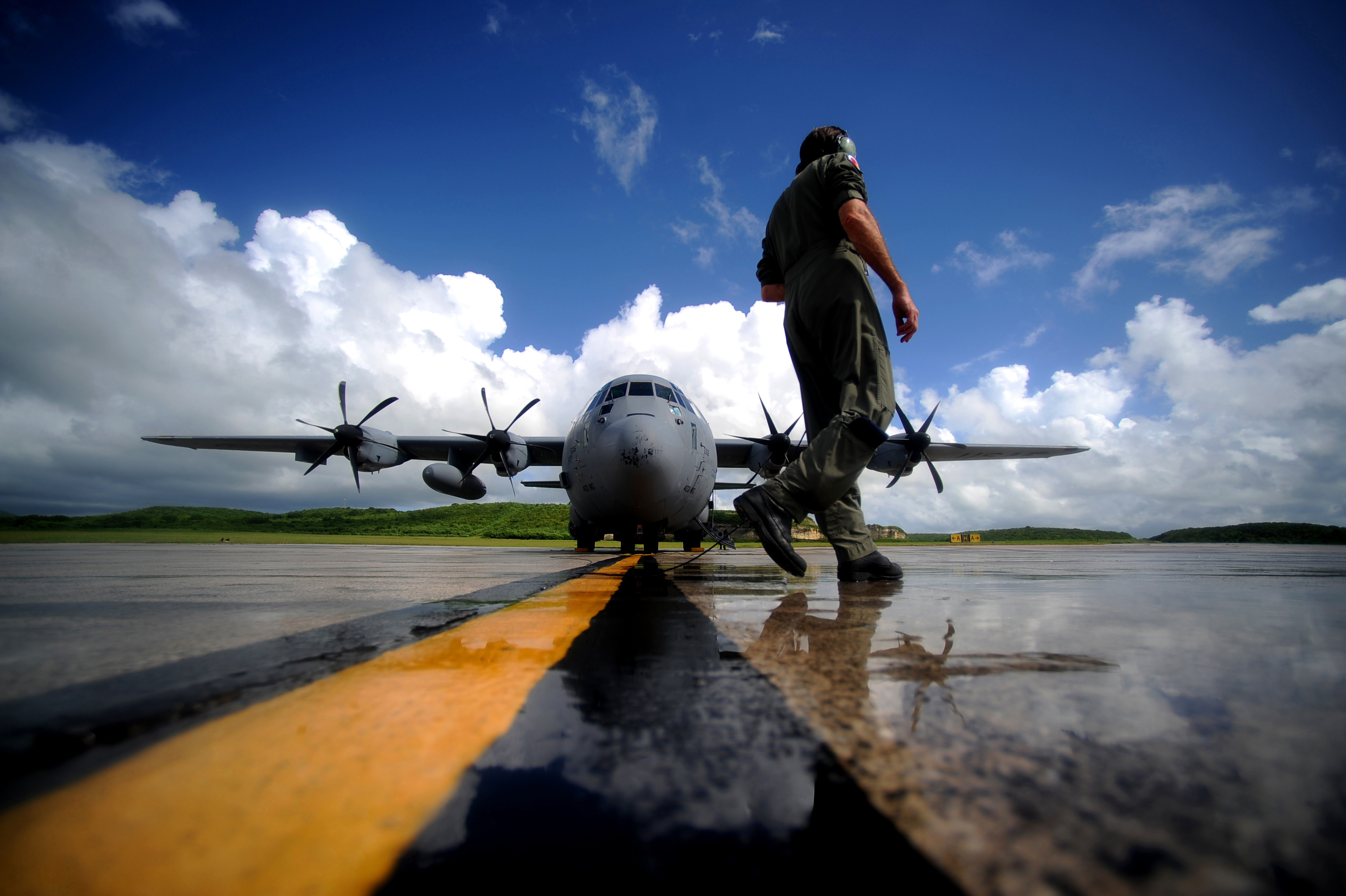
A WC-130J Hercules aircraft weather loadmaster of the 53rd WRS performs pre-engine start-up inspection (Note: Taken in St. Croix, Virgin Islands on 16 September 2010. The SFMR antenna housing is visible under the starboard wing outboard of the number four engine.)

The 53rd Weather Reconnaissance Squadron, also known by its nickname, Hurricane Hunters, is a flying unit of the United States Air Force, and "the only Department of Defense organization still flying into tropical storms and hurricanes." Aligned under the 403rd Wing of the Air Force Reserve Command (AFRC) and based at Keesler Air Force Base, Mississippi, with ten aircraft, it flies into tropical cyclones in the Atlantic Ocean, the Caribbean Sea, the Gulf of Mexico and the Central Pacific Ocean for the specific purpose of directly measuring weather data in and around those storms. The 53rd WRS currently operates the Lockheed WC-130J aircraft as its weather data collection platform.

The squadron was activated in 1944 during World War II as the 3rd Weather Reconnaissance Squadron, tracking weather in the North Atlantic between North America and Europe. Redesignated the 53rd Weather Reconnaissance Squadron in 1945, the term "Hurricane Hunters" was first applied to its activities in 1946. The 53rd became a part of the USAF before its inactivation in 1947, was reactivated in 1951 as a long range weather reconnaissance unit based in Bermuda and England, and since 1963 has been based in the southern United States or in Puerto Rico with its primary mission the measurement of tropical cyclones. The 53rd WRS moved to its present home station at Keesler in 1973, and after being briefly inactivated again between 1991 and 1993, became an Air Force Reserve unit.

The Hurricane Hunters of the Air Force Reserve are distinct from those of the Department of Commerce's NOAA Hurricane Hunters, based at Lakeland Linder International Airport, Florida, who use a pair of Lockheed WP-3D Orion and a Gulfstream IV-SP aircraft to also fly weather reconnaissance, data collection and scientific research missions. In accordance with its memorandum of agreement with NOAA, AFRC maintains a capability in the 53rd WRS for five sorties per day from its home station and two deployed locations in support of requirements for the National Hurricane Operations Plan, or two sorties a day during winter storm seasons. The 53rd also provides a subunit, the Chief, Aerial Reconnaissance Coordination, All Hurricanes at the National Hurricane Center to coordinate the activities of both organizations.

Concurrent with its operational mission, the 53rd is also tasked with recruiting, organizing and training assigned personnel to perform aerial weather reconnaissance, and its air crews are qualified to handle tactical airlift missions.

== History ==
=== Operational history ===
==== Hurricane hunting ====
Aerial reconnaissance of tropical storms first began in September 1935. In that year the United States Weather Bureau decentralized its hurricane warning system, which depended to a great extent on reports from ships at sea, opening three warning centers in San Juan, Puerto Rico; Jacksonville, Florida; and New Orleans, Louisiana. In August the Jacksonville center followed the progress of a developing hurricane east of the Bahamas, determining that it would pass through the Straits of Florida and strike the north coast of Cuba. It contacted the Cuban weather service when ship information was no longer available, but track of the storm was lost when the Cubans observed no evidence of it. Acting on a report from a Pan American Airlines pilot, a weather observation flight was requested of the Cuban Army Air Corps and on 2 September 1935 its chief training pilot, American expatriate Capt. Leonard J. Povey, volunteered to locate the system. Although he was unable to penetrate the storm in his open-cockpit Curtiss Hawk II biplane, Povey provided information that indicated the hurricane was moving north into the Florida Keys. The destructiveness of the 1935 Labor Day hurricane prompted Povey to recommend a regular aerial hurricane patrol. (Note: Leonard James Povey was born in 1904 in Nashua, New Hampshire and served in the United States Army Air Service from 1922 to 1925. Also a barnstormer, he was recruited in 1934 by Col. Fulgencio Batista to reorganize the Cuban air force. Nicknamed "Upside-Down Povey", he is credited with inventing the Cuban Eight aerobatic maneuver in 1936 while flying a demonstration at an air show in Florida. In 1938 he returned to the United States to become a flight test inspector for the new Civil Aeronautics Authority (precursor to the FAA), and in 1941 became vice president of flying operations at the Embry-Riddle School of Aviation. During World War II he worked for Fairchild Aircraft developing training aircraft. (Biography of Len Povey, University of Texas at Dallas).)

The 1943 Surprise Hurricane, which struck Houston during World War II, marked the first intentional meteorological flight into a hurricane. That summer, British pilots being trained as instrument instructor pilots at Bryan Army Airfield heard that the school was evacuating its AT-6 Texan trainers in the face of the oncoming hurricane, and began teasing their instructors about the airworthiness of the aircraft. Instrument flying school commander USAAF Lt. Col. Joseph B. Duckworth, a former airline pilot with Eastern Airlines who had developed instrument procedures for the carrier, bet his RAF students that he could safely fly into the storm and return. On 27 July 1943 he took out one of the trainers with 2nd Lt Ralph M. O'Hair navigating and flew it straight into the eye of the storm. After he returned safely, the base's only weather officer, 1st Lt William H. Jones-Burdick, took over the navigator's seat and Duckworth flew into the storm (now over land) a second time, this time recording their observations and measuring temperatures within the storm. The flights demonstrated that hurricane reconnaissance flights were feasible.

24 days later, on 19 August 1943, the AAF weather station at Waller Field, Trinidad, recorded unusually low pressures and received a similar report from Beane Field on Saint Lucia. Together with a report of high winds to the east from a U.S. Navy aircraft landing at Naval Operating Base Trinidad, the data prompted the first weather reconnaissance mission to locate a previously unreported tropical disturbance, which was flown the next morning. The flight, made by a North American B-25 Mitchell medium bomber assigned to the 25th Bombardment Group (an anti-submarine unit at nearby Edinburgh Field), proceeded from Waller to Barbados and then due east at altitudes between 8,000 and 600 ft (2,440 and 180 m) into the heart of Hurricane III of 1943. Using standard navigational position fixes, the mission plotted observations inflight on a chart as they proceeded and transmitted them to Beane Field for relay to Waller and Borinquen Field, Puerto Rico. (Note: The B-25, serial 43-5052, was flown by Capt. R.A. Field of the 10th Bombardment Squadron and carried weather officers Major I.I. Porush, Captain J. R. Fleming, and 1st Lt. P.W. Allen. A second flight, similar to Duckworth's, took off from Antigua with weather officer Capt. C.H. MacDougall aboard and also observed the storm.)

==== 53rd WRS history ====
The 53rd WRS was activated on 7 August 1944 at Presque Isle Army Air Field, Maine, originally as the 3 WRS. Many of its missions were flown from a forward base at Gander, Newfoundland, using B-25s. Its original mission was to fly weather tracks along aircraft ferry routes between North America and Allied Western Europe. During the 1946 season, when the 53d WRS acquired the Boeing RB-29 (later WB-29) Superfortress as its primary aircraft, the term "Hurricane Hunters" was first used to describe its missions. While not an ideal weather reconnaissance platform, the WB-29 proved to be comparatively safe and reliable. The first medium level penetration of a hurricane took place on 19 October 1947 by an RB-29 of the 53d WRS into Hurricane Love near Bermuda, validating penetration of tropical storms at lower altitudes as reasonably safe.

From Gander, the squadron moved to New Hampshire; Florida; Kindley Field, Bermuda; RAF Burtonwood, England, with forward basing at Dhahran, Saudi Arabia; Bermuda for a short time, and Hunter Air Force Base, Georgia. In 1966, now flying the Lockheed WC-130, the 53rd once again left the continental United States, this time for Ramey Air Force Base, Puerto Rico. When Ramey closed in 1973, the Hurricane Hunters relocated to their present location at Keesler.

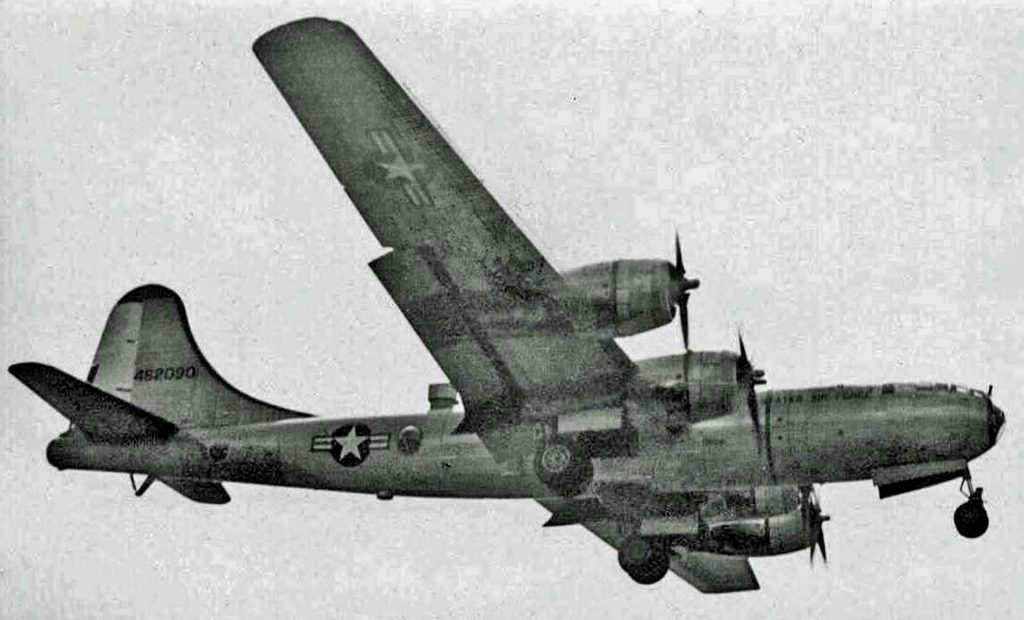
53rd WRS Boeing WB-29A weathership landing at its base at RAF Burtonwood in 1954

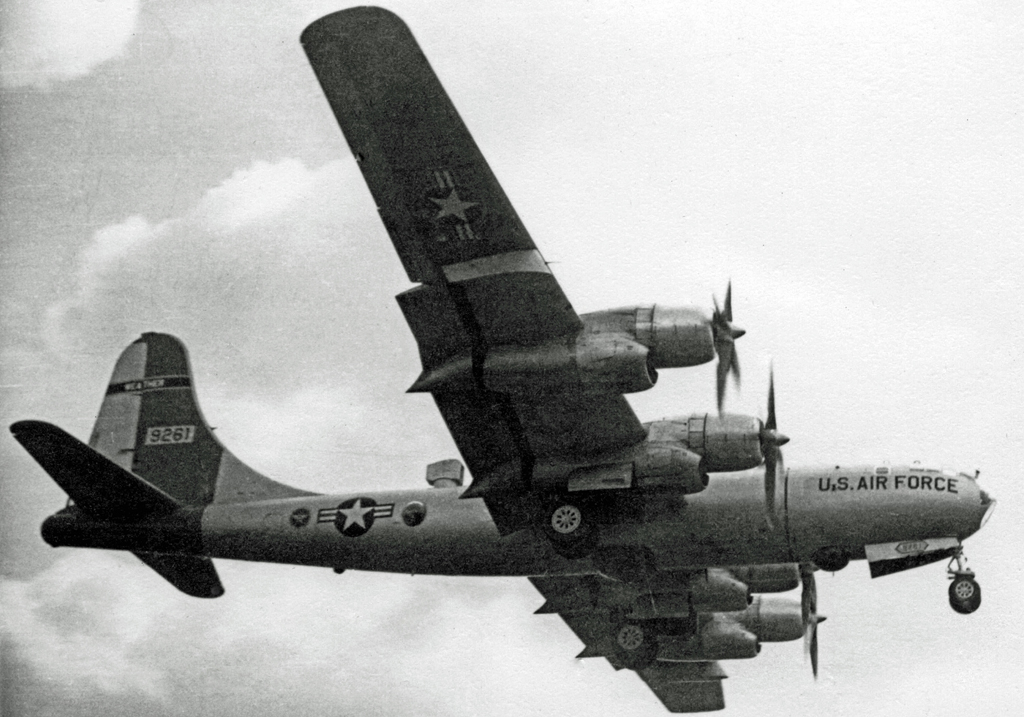
53rd WRS Boeing WB-50D weathership landing at RAF Burtonwood in 1956. The observation and sampling station is on top of the rear fuselage

On 18 September 1953, while based at Kindley, Bermuda, the squadron suffered its only mission-related loss of an aircraft, a WB-29. (Note: Swan 38, a WC-130H of the 53rd's sister 54th Weather Reconnaissance Squadron, was lost on 12 October 1974, while flying an alpha pattern into Typhoon Bess 400 miles northeast of Clark Air Base in the Philippines. The Hurricane Hunter Association established the Swan 38 Memorial Scholarship for outstanding students in the 403rd Wing. (Swan 38 Scholarship).) Returning to base with a runaway propeller on the inboard engine of the right wing, the propeller separated from its shaft and struck the engine beside it, causing both the wing and outboard engine to catch fire. The pilot ordered an immediate bailout, but the aircraft went out of control and only three of the 10-man crew survived. (Note: The WB-29 was serial 44-62277, a converted B-29A.)

In 1965 the 53rd WRS became the first squadron of the Air Weather Service to operate the WC-130 after its designation as such, and from Ramey flew the first WC-130 Hurricane Hunter mission on 27 August 1965, penetrating the eye of Hurricane Betsy.

In the 1970s, after its move to Keesler, the 53rd participated in two "firsts" in the changing of regulations to permit women to be qualify as aircrew. Sgt. Vickiann Esposito became the first female dropsonde operator and possibly the first fully qualified aircrew member (excepting flight nurses) in Air Force history, approved by Headquarters Air Force in December 1973 as a waiver of the regulation prohibiting the assignment of women, over the initial objections of the commanding general of the Air Mobility Command. In October 1977, after the regulation had been rescinded, 1st Lt. Florence Fowler became one of the first two women to be rated as navigators (now combat systems officers). (Note: Lt. Fowler's navigation school classmate 1st Lt. Ramona L. Roybal became a WC-135 navigator with the 55th Weather Reconnaissance Squadron at McClellan Air Force Base at the same time. A month earlier, the first rated female pilot, 2nd Lt. Carole A. Scherer, had been assigned to fly WC-130s with the 54th. The first Aerial Reconnaissance Weather Officer was 1st Lt. Nancy E. Holtgard, who was also assigned to the 54th on Guam.)

In 1976, the 815th Tactical Airlift Squadron of the Air Force Reserve, also based at Keesler, was redesignated the 815th Weather Squadron "Storm Trackers" and served as an associate squadron to the 53rd until 1987, when the 815th reverted to a tactical airlift unit because of reduced numbers of WC-130s. The Regular Air Force 53rd was inactivated in June 1991 for budgetary reasons and its assets and personnel transferred to the 815th TAS, which formed a flight to assume the weather recon mission while continuing its airlift role as well. On 1 November 1993, as a result of the impact of Hurricane Andrew the year before, the 53rd was reactivated as a full-time Air Force Reserve squadron to take over the weather reconnaissance mission from the 815th.

The WC-130H airframes flown by the 53rd were originally built in 1964–65 as C-130Es. Hurricane Andrew had also demonstrated a need for upgraded models to continue the Hurricane Hunter mission, and funding for ten replacements was authorized by Congress in FY1998. On 11 October 1999, the 53rd received its first Lockheed WC-130, and flew its first hurricane mission in the new model on 16 November, into Hurricane Lenny. Problems with the new model, primarily damage to its composite material 6-bladed propellers from hail and ice and a lack of sensitivity in its color radar images, delayed its Initial Operational Capability until just before the 2005 hurricane season. The propeller problem was overcome by bonding a metal sleeve to the leading edge of each blade and the radar issue by changes in the radar software coding.

While in conversion to the new airframe, the unit continued its mission of aerial weather reconnaissance and added a new weather-related mission type in 2003, using the WC-130Js to drop buoys ahead of impending tropical storms. In 2004, the unit started training to support tactical airlift missions in addition to its weather mission. The landfall of Hurricane Katrina on 29 August 2005 caused devastating damage to Keesler. An estimated one-third of the members of the parent 403rd Wing lost a home or had it extensively damaged. Yet the equipment and personnel of the squadron, flying out of Dobbins Air Reserve Base near Atlanta, Georgia when the hurricane struck, never missed a tasked mission during Katrina or follow-up storms.

The operations of the 53rd WRS were affected by the federal budget sequestration of 2013. Furloughs of personnel, amounting to two days in every pay period per member, resulted in a 20% cut in capability, according to the wing commander of the 403rd Wing on 24 July 2013. While sequestration was in effect, this meant the squadron was capable of working only two storms simultaneously at full mission scheduling instead of the normal three, and that pace sustainable only for five or six days.

== Hurricane Hunter mission ==
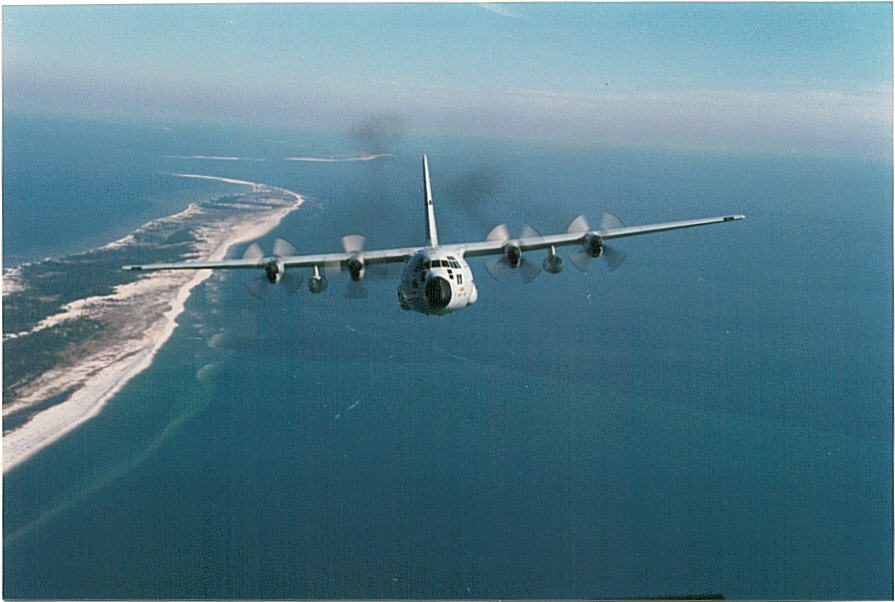
WC-130H Hercules in flight

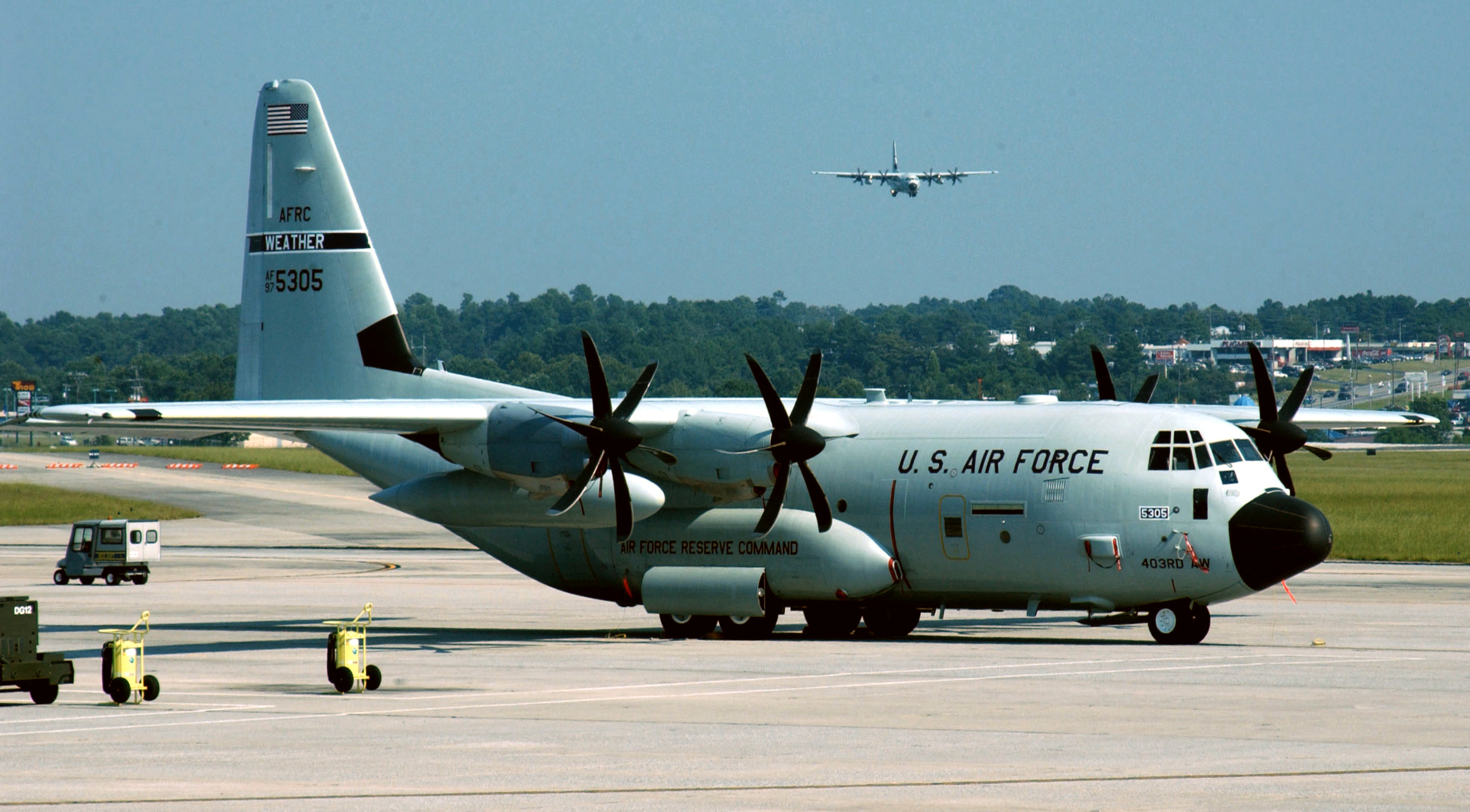
WC-130J Hercules on the ramp at Dobbins ARB, Georgia, with another landing behind it, during reployment for Hurricane Katrina.

The 53rd Weather Reconnaissance Squadron, using the call signs Teal 70 to Teal 79, (Note: The 53rd picked up the call sign "Teal" in 1993 from the 815th, which had used it when designated the 815th Weather Squadron and again after 1991 when it contained a Hurricane Hunter flight in addition to its tactical airlift flights. As an active force squadron the 53rd had previously used the call sign "Gull.") flies missions into hurricanes and weather systems for research purposes and observation. Although satellite data has revolutionized weather forecasters' ability to detect early signs of tropical cyclones before they form, there are still many important tasks for which this information is not suitable. Satellites cannot determine the interior barometric pressure of a hurricane, nor provide accurate wind speed information. These data are needed to accurately predict hurricane development and movement. Because satellites cannot collect the data and ships are too slow and vulnerable, the only viable way to collect this information is with aircraft. Meteorological parameters measured, in order of priority, are:

- Geographical position of the flight level vortex center (vortex fix) and relative position of the surface center, if known;
- Center sea-level pressure determined by dropsonde or extrapolation from within 1,500 feet (460 meters) of the sea surface or from the computed 925 hPa, 850 hPa, or 700 hPa height;
- Minimum 700, 850 or 925 hPa height, if available;
- Wind data (continuous observations along the flight track) for surface and flight level;
- Surface wind data from Stepped-Frequency Microwave Radiometer (SFMR);
- High density three-dimensional Doppler radial velocities of the tropical cyclone core circulation;
- Temperature at flight level;
- Rain rate from SFMR;
- Sea surface temperature; and
- Dew-point temperature at flight level.

The 53rd WRS is equipped with ten pallet-instrumented (Note: Pallet instrumentation for the WC-130J's mission consists of a Communication Navigation Identification Unit, Satellite Communication System, Advanced Vertical Atmospheric Profiling System to receive and analyze dropsonde data, Atmospheric Sounding Processing Environment, and the Aerial Reconnaissance Weather Officer's computer with Weatherbird software package, all of which are described in the External Links. Between May 2007 and February 2008 all ten WC-130J Weatherbirds were also equipped with wing-mounted Stepped-Frequency Microwave Radiometer ("Smurf") pods, described separately. In 2009 the SFMR systems were retrofitted with a new antenna that during heavy rains resulted in an over-calculation of light winds, caused by water intrusion in the radome through drain holes in the new antenna. The problem was identified during Hurricane Felicia and found to have affected 50% of missions flown during the season. It was corrected in September 2009 by sealing the drain holes.) WC-130J aircraft to collect the required meteorological data. (Note: >AF s/n 96-5300 through −5302, 97–5303 through −5306, 98–5307 and −5308, and 99-5309.) The area of responsibility for the "Hurricane Hunters" is from midway through the Atlantic Ocean west to the Hawaiian Islands, although they have also been tasked to fly into typhoons in the Pacific Ocean on occasion, as well as gather data in winter storms. (Note: The squadron previously tasked for tropical storm reconnaissance in the Western Pacific, the 54th WRS, was inactivated in 1987.) The Hurricane Hunters are tasked to support 24-hour-a-day continuous operations with the ability to fly to up to 3 storms at a time with a response time of 16 hours. This necessitates a mission organization of ten full-time aircrews and ten part-time.

The WC-130J employs a standard five person crew element of a pilot, co-pilot, Combat Systems Officer (CSO), aerial reconnaissance weather officer (ARWO), and a weather loadmaster/dropsonde operator, with a second loadmaster assigned when required. The ARWO is the flight meteorologist and acts as flight director inside the storm system. Operational crews train twice monthly at Keesler AFB and fly weather recon missions when available. 53rd pilots and loadmasters go through their initial C-130J training at the 314th Airlift Wing's tactical airlift training center at Little Rock Air Force Base, Arkansas. CSOs and ARWOs from the 53rd WRS have no formal school and train in-house at Keesler utilizing an Air Education and Training Command-approved syllabus for their specialized mission training.

The 53rd WRS uses Henry E. Rohlsen Airport on St. Croix as its primary forward-deployed location for North Atlantic basin operations. Each May since 1996, when it switched operations from Antigua to the U.S. Virgin Islands to operate from U.S. soil, the squadron prepositions maintenance equipment and materiel at Rohlsen in preparation for the coming season. From July through September three crews are commonly forward-deployed to St. Croix at any given time with rotations of a week's deployment per month.

Since 1969, the 53rd WRS also performs winter storm weather reconnaissance off both coasts of the United States between 1 November and 15 April in support of the National Centers for Environmental Prediction. These missions are flown at the WC-130's service ceiling of 30,000 ft (9,100 m), which subjects them to turbulence, lightning and icing. The crews collect data ahead of weather systems, dropping weather buoys along their routes, before they move off the eastern seaboard to help determine if the conditions are right to intensify into Nor'easter blizzards. In 1997 and 1998, the Hurricane Hunters also flew winter storms in the Gulf of Alaska. The predetermined tracks are six to eleven hours in duration, with one to three missions flown per major winter storm event. Coverage of winter storms in the eastern Pacific has become standard during the month of February, operating TDY from either Elmendorf Air Force Base, Alaska, or Hickam Air Force Base, Hawaii.

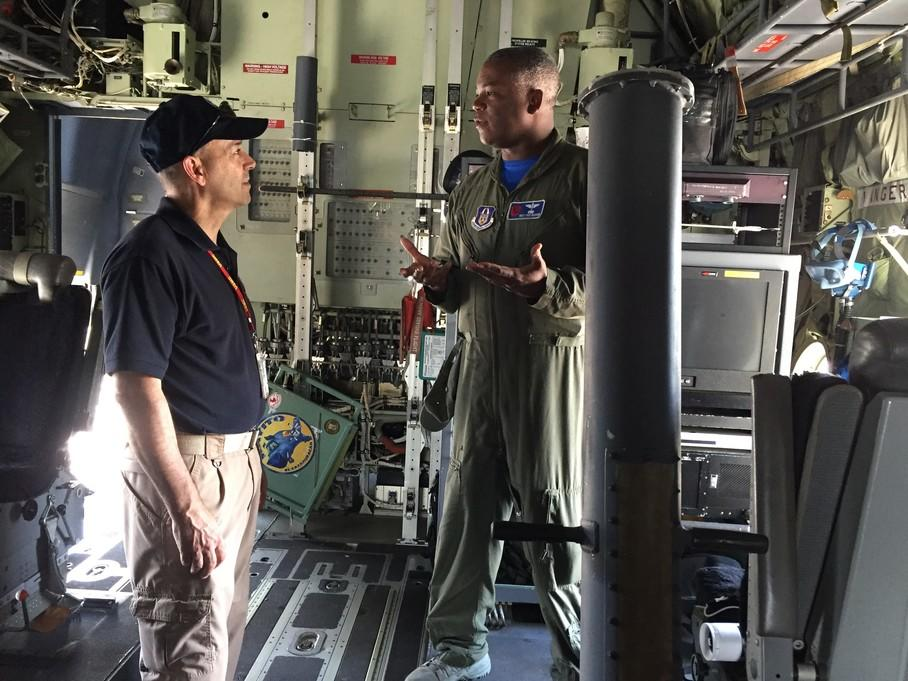
53rd Weather Reconnaissance Squadron and Federal Emergency Management Agency staff discuss Hurricane Hunter aircraft operations aboard an Air Force Reserve WC-130J Super Hercules

The 53rd works closely with the National Hurricane Center, a division of the National Weather Service (NWS) located in Miami, that tracks hurricanes to provide early warning service for Atlantic basin storms. It maintains a subunit, the Chief, Aerial Reconnaissance Coordination, All Hurricanes as a point-of-contact and provides the staff and equipment to coordinate Department of Commerce requirements for hurricane data, assign weather reconnaissance missions and monitor all data transmitted from weather reconnaissance aircraft of DOC and the 53rd WRS. To that end CARCAH is responsible for producing, publishing, and coordinating the Tropical Cyclone Plan of the Day (TCPOD) during hurricane season. (Note: The TCPOD is available at http://www.nhc.noaa.gov/ by clicking on Aircraft Recon under "Tools & Data" for Plan of the day.)

The 53rd WRS maintains similarly configured satellite communications ground stations within CARCAH at the NHC and its facility at Keesler to receive and process data from the aircraft. The Keesler ground station is maintained as a backup to the primary system at NHC, which has greater data streaming capability, and would be crewed by CARCAH personnel in the event of a long-term satellite communications failure at NHC. During temporary outages, 53rd personnel at Keesler act as operators and relay data from the aircraft by land line to the CARCAH ground station. Processed data is transmitted to the Weather Product Management and Distribution System (WPMDS) of the Air Force Weather Agency at Offutt Air Force Base, Nebraska, which then relays it to the NWS Telecommunication Gateway at Silver Spring, Maryland, for worldwide distribution. The Keesler site has direct communications capability with WPMDS in the event of land line/internet failure between Keesler and the NHC. The system also provides backup transmission paths to WPMDS using local NHC servers and satellite connection to Keesler in the event of internet outages, except if an outage originates at Offutt.

=== Tropical cyclone operational profiles ===
When a tropical disturbance becomes suspect for development as a tropical or subtropical cyclone, the NHC assigns the system a temporary tracking ("Investigation") number (Note: Numbers 90 through 99 in the cyclone numbering system are reserved for such disturbances. Although not required, the "90" series of cyclone numbers is assigned sequentially and normally reused throughout the calendar year. The number is further modified by a two-letter ocean basin code. Investigation AL97 (or "97L" in verbal shorthand) would be the seventh sequential disturbance in the North Atlantic basin, while Invest. EP92 (92E) is the second in the East Pacific basin north of the equator.) and requests the 53rd WRS to determine if the winds are blowing in a counterclockwise rotation, indicating a "closed cyclonic circulation". This investigative mission is flown at an altitude of 500–1,500 ft (150–460 m) above the ocean surface in a pattern designated by the ARWO aboard the mission WC-130 based on observed conditions. (Note: "Suggested" investigative patterns are the X, Box, and Delta patterns, described and illustrated at NHOP 2015, pages 5–19 and 5–20.) The ARWO, using a stepped-frequency microwave radiometer (SFMR, or "smurf"), (Note: The SFMR is designed to continuously measure surface winds directly below the WC-130J, and is installed on the aircraft within a wing-mounted antenna pod. As the plane flies through a storm, the SFMR senses microwave radiation naturally emitted from foam created on the sea by winds at the surface. Computers determine wind speeds based on the levels of microwave radiation detected, extrapolated from the winds at the aircraft's altitude or from a dropsonde released from the aircraft. The SFMR can also determine rainfall rates within a system, which in addition to wind speeds at flight level, provides structural detail of the storm.) continuously monitors ocean waves to determine wind speed and direction. The low-level wind and pressure fields provide an accurate picture for NHC forecasters. Investigative missions are usually flown during daylight and may be timed to arrive in the investigative area at first light in the morning or last light in the evening. Weak pressure gradients, large areas of calm, and light winds in areas of heavy convective activity often make vortex fixes difficult to obtain in areas of weak circulation, challenging the skills of the crews.

“Hurricane Hunters” flying through the eye of Hurricane Melissa

Once NHC determines that there is circulation within the disturbance, the mission becomes a sequentially numbered "fix" mission, conducted initially every six hours by rotating flights in cooperation with NOAA missions, and then at three-hour intervals as the storm moves within specified parameters. (Note: A typical weather reconnaissance Tropical Cyclone Plan of the Day (TCPOD) is reproduced here. Up to four 6-hour fixes per day are conducted when a system is within 500 nautical miles of landfall and west of 55°W in the Atlantic, and up to eight 3-hour fixes per day if within 300 nautical miles of the coast of the United States, Hawaii, Puerto Rico, the Virgin islands, or DOD installations. Up to two "synoptic surveillance" missions per day may be flown on the periphery of systems with a potential for landfall. (NHOP 2015, p. 5–12).) During the "fix" mission, the ARWO directs the aircraft to the true center or vortex of the storm by monitoring the radar presentation, temperature, pressure, and mapping the wind fields as the aircraft makes left-hand turns. Vortices determined by individual parameters including visual observation may not coincide at the same geographic location. Surface and upper-level centers may be displaced by many miles. In order to make a reliable evaluation of its size and configuration, the crew flies through the disturbance using "Flight Pattern Alpha" consisting of intercardinal headings with legs 105 nautical miles (190 km) in length. (Note: "5.8.1. Flight Pattern ALPHA Operational Details. 5.8.1.1. Flight Levels and Sequence. Flight levels will normally be 1,500 ft, 925 hPa, 850 hPa, or 700 hPa, depending on data requirements and flight safety. Legs will normally be 105 nm long and flown on intercardinal tracks (45 degrees off cardinal tracks). The pattern can be started at any intercardinal point and then repeated throughout the mission. Prior to starting an inbound or outbound track the aircrew should evaluate all available data, e.g., radar presentation, satellite photo, for flight safety. Once started on course, every effort should be made to maintain a straight track and the tasked altitude. A horizontal observation is required at each leg end point. This data is transmitted immediately. The ALPHA pattern may be modified to satisfy unique customer requirements (such as extending legs to examine the wind profile of a strong storm) or because of proximity of land or warning areas." (NHOP 2015, p. 5–19).) The Alpha pattern is repeated at least twice during the mission, which will typically see a penetration of the eye of the system four times. Patterns may also be adjusted to meet circumstances encountered in the system. In August 2011, as Hurricane Irene neared the Delmarva Peninsula between landfalls, a 53rd WRS ARWO directed a pattern with shorter legs and more rapid turnarounds because of the proximity of land, making seven center fixes in one flight. Flight weather data is continuously collected and sent directly to the NHC by satellite communications. Since the WC-130J is not equipped for aerial refueling, the alpha pattern continues until minimum fuel reserve is reached, or until the NHC has received all the data it requires.

Major hurricanes (Category 3 or higher in the Saffir–Simpson scale) are entered at approximately 10,000 ft (3,000 m) altitude. (Note: Atmospheric pressure is determined by deviations from "standard levels" used by meteorologists worldwide. Stronger storms have lower pressures, and the lower the actual altitude from the standard level, the lower the pressure. The Hurricane Hunters use autopilot to fly a steady atmospheric pressure of 925 (2500 ft/762 m), 850 (4780 ft/1457 m), or 700 millibars (9880 ft/3011 m) of pressure. Storms of category 3 strength or greater are flown at 700mb. By using a radar altimeter to measure actual altitude above the surface, the ARWO calculates the "height of standard surface" reported to NHC to make these determinations.) While penetrating the eyewall, a dropsonde is released to determine the maximum sustained winds at the surface and a second dropsonde is released in the eye to detect the lowest pressure at the surface. After exiting the eye, the ARWO creates a Vortex Data Message that includes the precise latitude and longitude of the storm center as well as its maximum winds, maximum temperature, and minimum sea level pressure. (Note: A description of the contents of the vortex data message is here. Standard sea level pressure is 1013 millibars. A "supplemental vortex data message" gives a cross-section of weather data at 15-nautical mile intervals, both inbound and outbound, along the 105-mile intercardinal legs to locate damaging winds in the storm's quadrants. Observation requirements are summarized in Table 5-1, page 5.5, National Hurricane Operations Plan 2015, linked below. During active tropical cyclones, the most current vortex data message can be found at http://www.nhc.noaa.gov/ by clicking on Aircraft Recon under "Tools & Data".) The average duration of a "Hurricane Hunter" mission is ten hours, with five to six hours on station, depending on the distance of the storm from base, when tasked to perform three fixes at three-hour intervals.

== Lineage ==
- Constituted as the 3rd Weather Reconnaissance Squadron, Air Route, Medium on 7 August 1944

Activated on 31 August 1944
Redesignated 3rd Reconnaissance Squadron, Weather, Heavy on 26 January 1945
Redesignated 53rd Reconnaissance Squadron, Long Range, Weather on 15 June 1945
Redesignated 53rd Reconnaissance Squadron, Very Long Range, Weather on 27 November 1945
Inactivated on 15 October 1947
Redesignated 53rd Strategic Reconnaissance Squadron, Medium, Weather on 22 January 1951
Activated on 21 February 1951
Redesignated 53rd Weather Reconnaissance Squadron on 15 February 1954
Discontinued on 18 March 1960
Organized on 8 January 1962
Inactivated on 30 June 1991
Activated in the reserve on 1 November 1993

=== Assignments ===
- North Atlantic Division, Air Transport Command, 31 August 1944
- Air Transport Command, 12 January 1945
- 311th Photographic Wing (later 311th Reconnaissance Wing), 15 February 1945
- Air Transport Command, 13 March 1946
- Air Weather Service, 20 March 1946 – 15 October 1947
- 2108th Air Weather Group, 21 February 1951
- Air Weather Service, 2 May 1951
- 9th Weather Group, 20 April 1953
- 2058th Air Weather Wing, 25 November 1953
- 2d Weather Wing, 8 February 1954 – 18 March 1960
- 9th Weather Reconnaissance Group, 8 January 1962
- 9th Weather Reconnaissance Wing, 1 July 1965
- 41st Rescue and Weather Reconnaissance Wing, 1 September 1975
- Air Rescue Service, 1 August 1989 – 30 June 1991
- 403rd Operations Group, 1 November 1993 – present

=== Stations ===
- Presque Isle Army Air Field, Maine, 31 August 1944
- Grenier Field, New Hampshire, 9 November 1944
- Morrison Field, Florida, 8 November 1946 – 21 July 1947
- Kindley Field, Bermuda, 17 August – 15 October 1947
- Kindley Air Force Base, Bermuda, 21 February 1951 – 5 November 1953
- Burtonwood Air Depot (later RAF Burtonwood), England, 7 November 1953
- RAF Alconbury, England, 25 April 1959
- RAF Mildenhall, England, 10 August 1959 – 18 March 1960
- Kindley Air Force Base, Bermuda, 8 January 1962 – 1 July 1963
- Hunter Air Force Base, Georgia, 31 August 1963
- Ramey Air Force Base, Puerto Rico, 15 June 1966
- Keesler Air Force Base, Mississippi, 1 July 1973 – 30 June 1991
- Keesler Air Force Base, Mississippi, 1 November 1993 – present

=== Aircraft ===
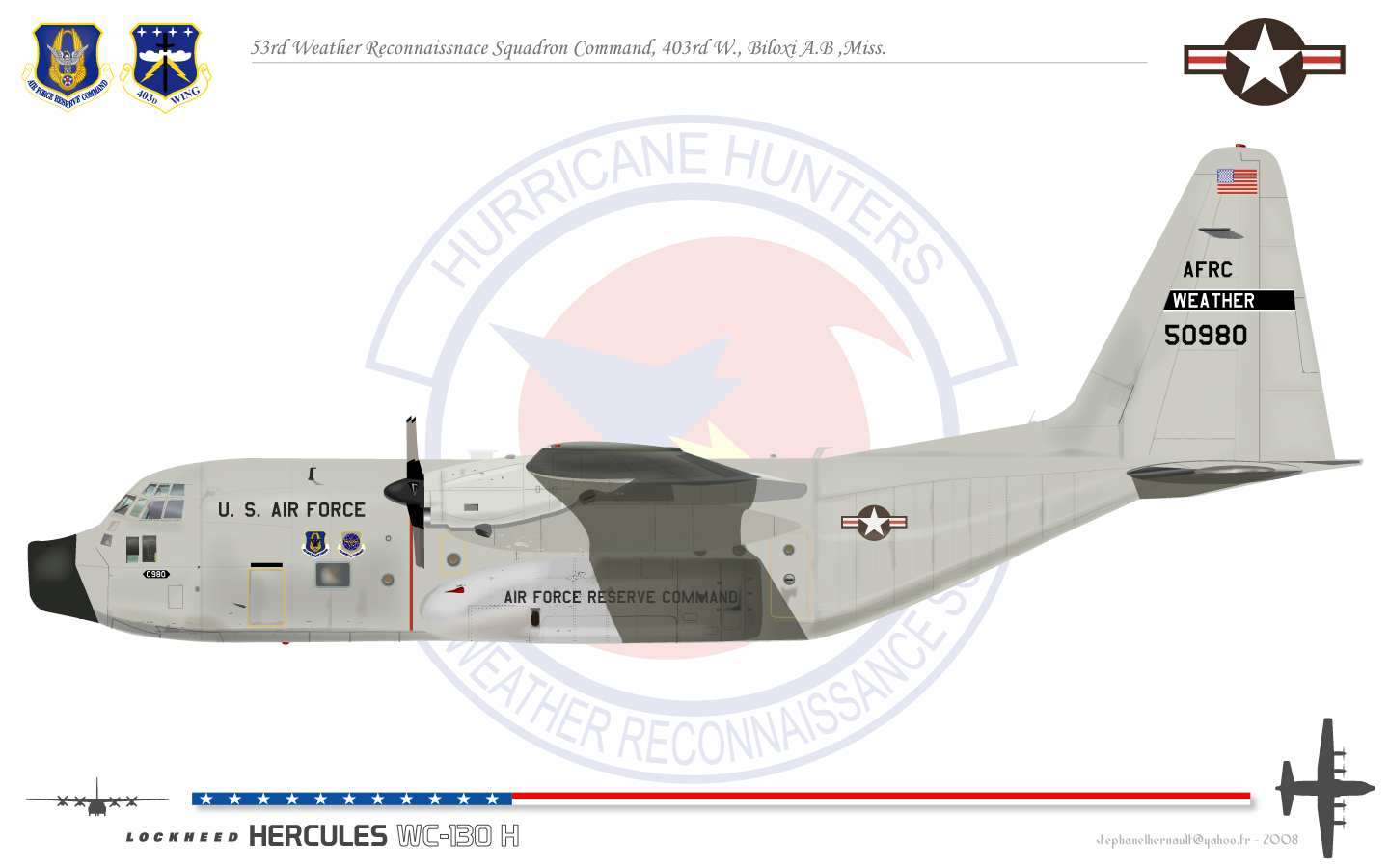
53rd WRS WC-130H

- Boeing RB-17 Flying Fortress (1945–1946)
- Boeing TB-17 Flying Fortress (1945–1947)
- North American B-25 Mitchell (1946–1947)
- North American WB-25D Mitchell (1944, 1946–1947)
- Boeing B-29 Superfortress (1946–1947)
- Boeing WB-29A Superfortress Superfortress (1951–1956)
- Boeing WB-50D Superfortress (1956–1960, 1962–1963)
- Boeing WB-47E Stratojet (1963–1969)
- Lockeed C-130 Hercules (1965)
- Lockeed WC-130A/B/E/H Hercules (1965–1991, 1993–2006)
- Lockeed RC-130 (1974-1975)
- Lockeed HC-130 Hercules (1976)
- Lockheed WC-130J Hercules (1999–present)

=== Awards ===
Award streamer	Award	Dates	Notes
	Meritorious Unit Citation	23 May 1945 – 31 October 1945	3d Reconnaissance Squadron (later 53rd Reconnaissance Squadron)
	Air Force Outstanding Unit Award	1 December 1958–30 September 1959	53rd Weather Reconnaissance Squadron
	Air Force Outstanding Unit Award	1 July 1967 – 30 June 1968	53rd Weather Reconnaissance Squadron
	Air Force Outstanding Unit Award	1 January 1971 – 31 December 1971	53rd Weather Reconnaissance Squadron
	Air Force Outstanding Unit Award	1 September 1975 – 1 May 1977	53rd Weather Reconnaissance Squadron
	Air Force Outstanding Unit Award	16 July 1977 – 16 July 1979	53rd Weather Reconnaissance Squadron
	Air Force Outstanding Unit Award	17 July 1979 – 15 June 1981	53rd Weather Reconnaissance Squadron
	Air Force Outstanding Unit Award	1 April 1984 – 31 March 1986	53rd Weather Reconnaissance Squadron
	Air Force Outstanding Unit Award	1 April 1986 – 31 March 1988	53rd Weather Reconnaissance Squadron
	Air Force Outstanding Unit Award	1 November 1993 – 30 April 1994	53rd Weather Reconnaissance Squadron
	Air Force Outstanding Unit Award	1 May 1994 – 30 April 1996	53rd Weather Reconnaissance Squadron
	Air Force Outstanding Unit Award	1 May 1996 – 31 August 1997	53rd Weather Reconnaissance Squadron

== Cable television series ==
The Weather Channel announced in January 2012 that it would be presenting a six-episode docu-reality series (Hurricane Hunters) in July 2012 depicting the operations of the 53rd WRS during the 2011 hurricane season. However even before its debut, the series and its network were beset by controversy when a 53rd WRS member, Major (then Captain) Nicole L. Mitchell, an ARWO and an on-camera meteorologist for TWC from July 2004 to January 2011, revealed on 4 June 2012 that she had filed suit 9 September 2011 in the United States District Court for the Northern District of Georgia against The Weather Channel and its owners, NBC Universal and two private equity firms, Bain Capital and the Blackstone Group, claiming that the termination of her employment in 2010 was based on her part-time Air Force Reserve service, was discriminatory and was in violation of the Uniformed Services Employment and Reemployment Rights Act (USERRA) of 1994. A second nine-segment season, filmed in August and October 2012, aired on The Weather Channel beginning in June 2013. Mitchell subsequently became the Chief Meteorologist at Al Jazeera America and after September 2015 became the only remaining Air Force meteorologist with personal experience flying through Hurricane Katrina.

== See also ==
- Storm chasing

== Notes ==
Explanatory notes

Citations'
