= Center For Naval Aviation Technical Training Unit Keesler =

Aviation technical school operated by the U.S. Navy in Biloxi, Mississippi

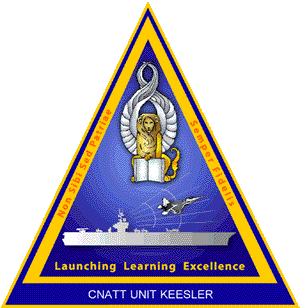
CNATT Unit Keesler logo

The Center For Naval Aviation Technical Training Unit Keesler (CNATT Unit Keesler, CENNAVAVNTRAU Keesler AFB MS, UIC 32861) is an aviation technical school operated by the U.S. Navy in Biloxi, Mississippi. It is located on the campus of Keesler Air Force Base. It was known as Naval Technical Training Unit Keesler (NTTU Keesler) prior to 2003.

The command hosts the GPETE (General Purpose Electronic Test Equipment) Calibration and Maintenance School (GCAMS), Advanced Calibration Technician School (ACTS), and physical/dimensional calibration (Phase B&D) schools, and participates in the joint service Precision Physical and Dimensional Calibration School (PHYS-D).
