= 2d Weather Wing =

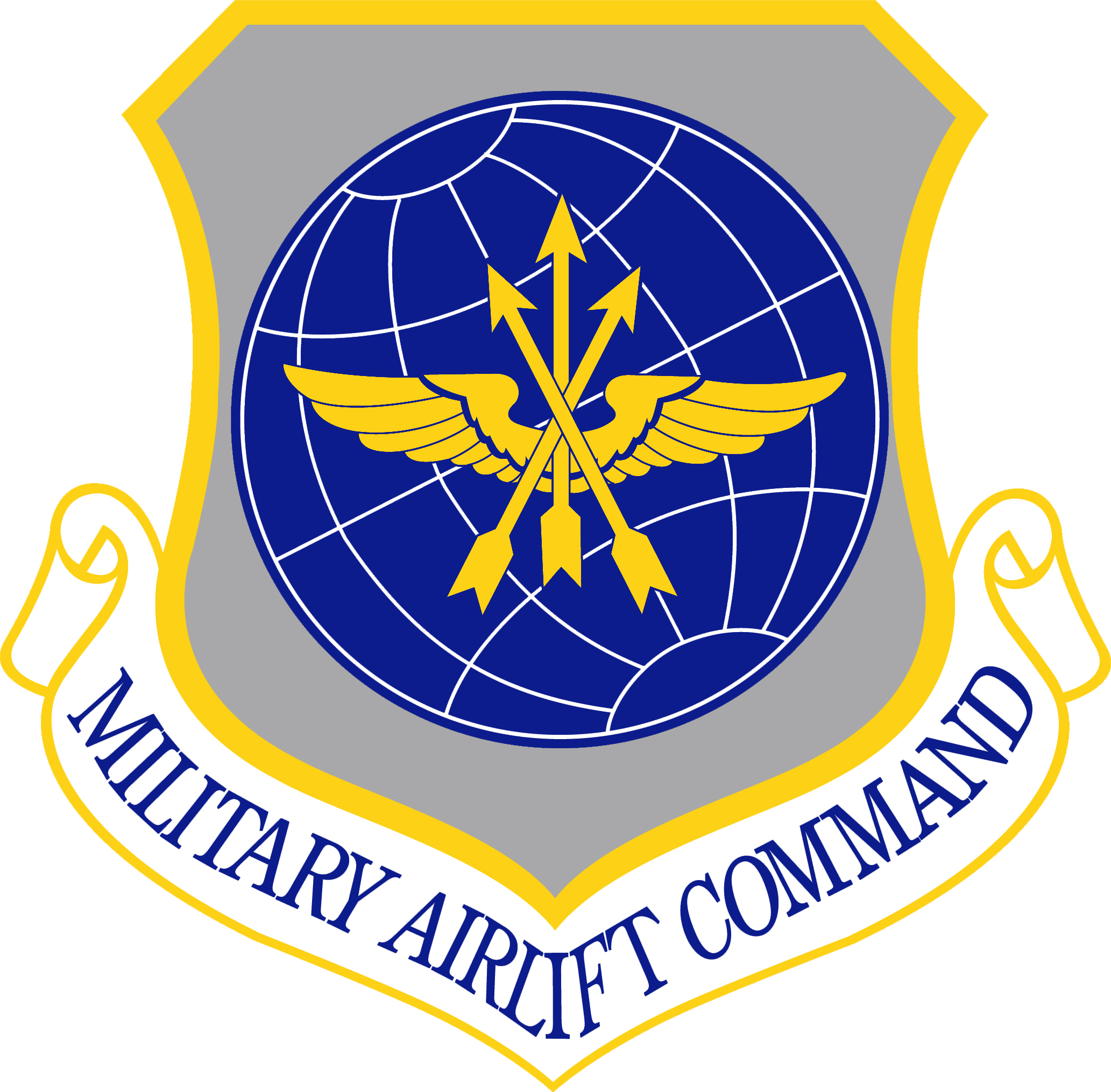
2d Weather Wing

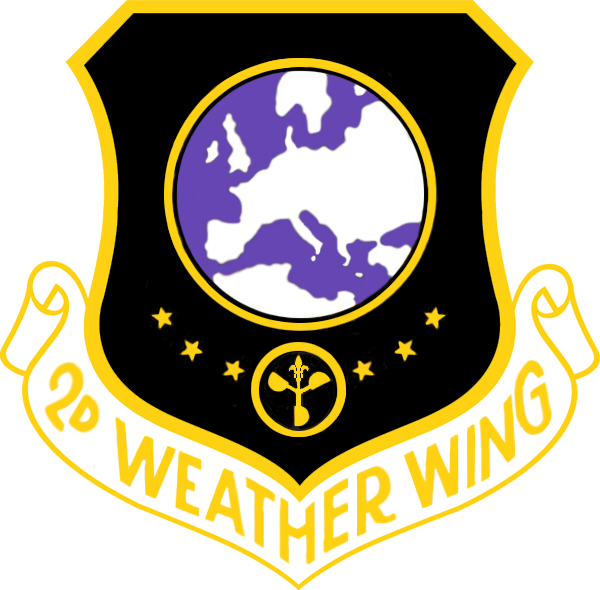
- Emblem
- Active: 1954-1991
- Country: United States
- Branch: United States Air Force
- Role: Regional command of weather units
- Part of: Air Weather Service
- Motto: Nulla Aequalis Secundae Latin (None are the Equal of the Second)
- Decorations: Air Force Outstanding Unit Award

Aircraft flown
- Reconnaissance: WB-29 Superfortress; WB-50 Superfortress

The 2d Weather Wing was a military meteorological (weather) unit of the Air Weather Service, United States Air Force. It was established, 24 Nov 1953 and activated on 8 Feb 1954.

== History ==
The wing provided staff and operational meteorological aerospace environmental support to the U.S. European Command, U.S. Air Forces Europe, U.S. Army Europe, European Information Systems Division, elements of other Air Force and Army major commands assigned to the European theater, and to the North Atlantic Treaty Organization. It also provided staff meteorological officers to the following NATO organizations: Allied Air Forces Central Europe, Fourth Allied Tactical Air Force and the Central Army Group.

Detachments included:

- Det 6, Vaihingen, Germany
- Det 13, Hahn AB, Germany
- Det 40, RAF Croughton, England

== Lineage ==
- Established on 24 November 1953

Activated on 8 February 1954
Inactivated on 1 October 1991

=== Assignments ===
- Air Weather Service. 8 February 1954 – 1 October 1991 (attached to United States Air Forces Europe)

=== Components ===
- 18th Weather Squadron, 8 February 1954 – 3 October 1960
- 28th Weather Squadron, 8 February 1954 – 30 September 1991
- 29th Weather Squadron, 8 February 1954 – 18 May 1958
- 31st Weather Squadron, 8 February 1954 – c. 15 September 1991
- 53d Weather Reconnaissance Squadron, 8 February 1954 – 18 March 1960
- 131st Weather Flight, August 1962 – c. 8 November 1962
- 163d Weather Flight, August 1962 – c. 8 November 1962
- 164th Weather Flight, August 1962 – c. 8 November 1962

=== Stations ===
- Fürstenfeldbruck Air Base, Germany, 8 February 1954
- Bitburg Air Base, Germany, 6 December 1955
- Lindsey Air Station, Germany, March 1958
- Wiesbaden Air Base, Germany, 10 July 1973
- Lindsey Air Station, Germany, 8 May 1973
- Ramstein Air Base, Germany, 15 August 1973
- Kapaun Air Station, Germany, 15 September 1975
