= 403rd Operations Group =

403rd Operations Group

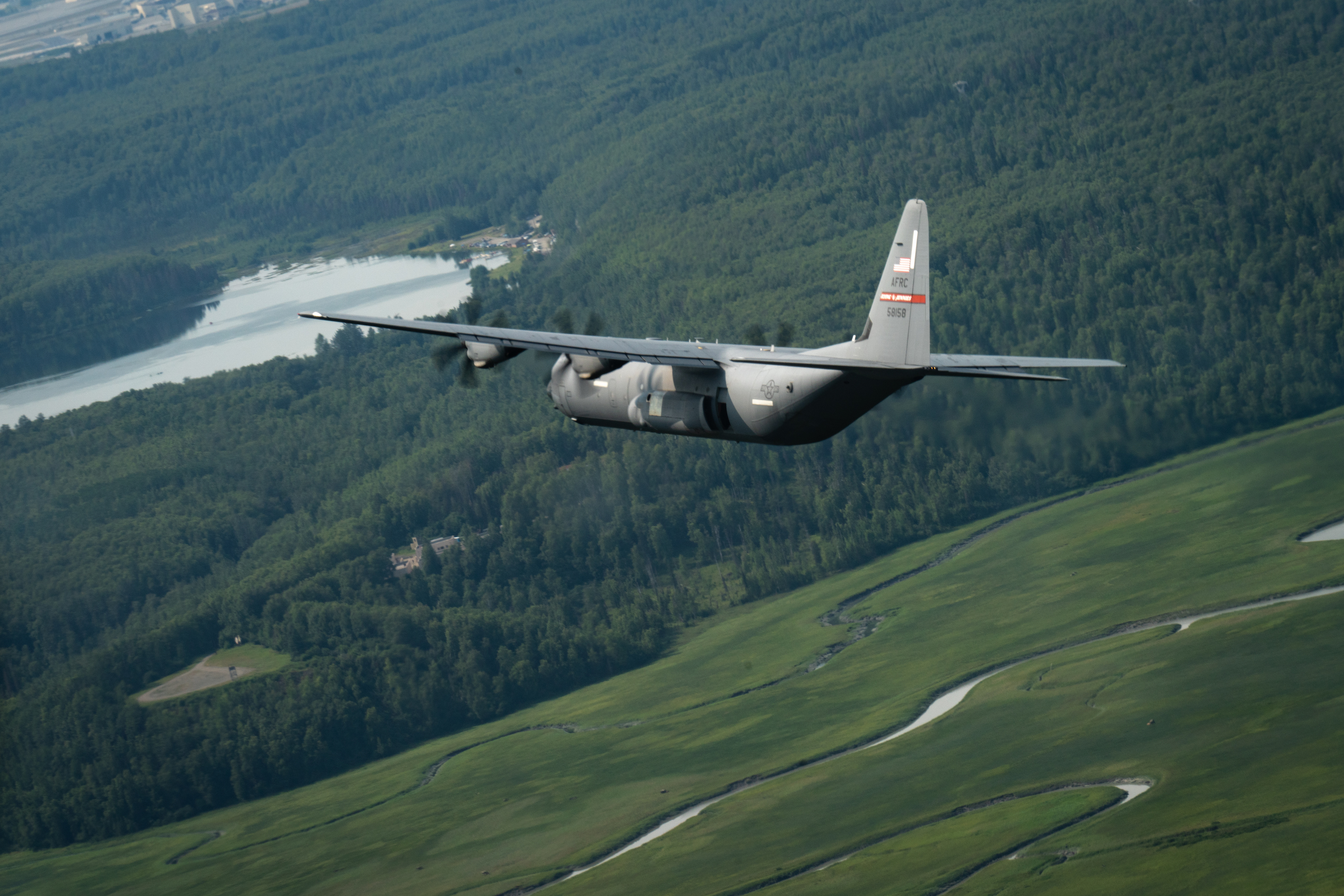
- A C-130J Super Hercules assigned to the 815th Airlift Squadron over Alaska
- Active: 1942–1946; 1949–1953; 1953–1959; 1992–present
- Country: United States
- Branch: United States Air Force
- Role: Airlift & Weather Reconnaissance
- Part of: Air Force Reserve Command: Twenty-Second Air Force; 403rd Wing
- Garrison/HQ: Keesler Air Force Base

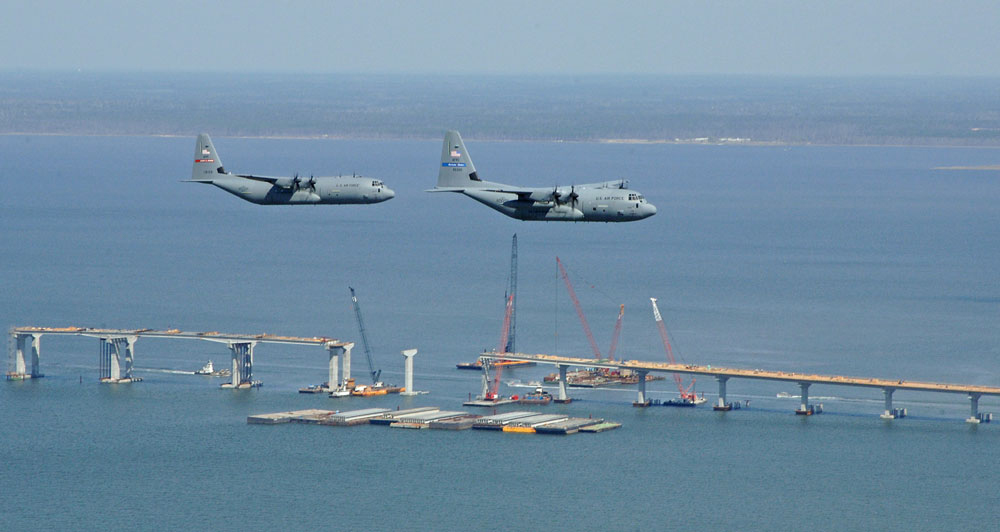
The WC-130J (right) and C-130J-30 (left) fly over the Bay St. Louis Bridge on 20 May 2007. The 815th Airllift Squadron "Flying Jennies" and the 53rd Weather Reconnaissance Squadron "Hurricane Hunters" are part of the Air Force Reserve's 403rd Wing located at Keesler Air Force Base, Miss. The bridge was damaged by Hurricane Katrina and will re-open 17 May 2007.

The 403rd Operations Group (403 OG) is the operational flying component of the United States Air Force Reserve 403rd Wing. It is stationed at Keesler Air Force Base, Mississippi.

== Units ==
The 403rd Operations Group performs missions including airlift of personnel, equipment and supplies. Additionally, the group is the only unit in the Department of Defense tasked to organize, equip, train and perform all hurricane weather reconnaissance in support of the Department of Commerce.

- 403rd Operations Support Squadron
- 53rd Weather Reconnaissance Squadron "Hurricane Hunters"
- 815th Airlift Squadron "Flying Jennies"
- 5th Operational Weather Flight
- 36th Aeromedical Evacuation Squadron

== History ==
Trained for overseas troop carrier operations from late 1942 to the summer of 1943, when it moved to the South Pacific.

Transported men and supplies to forward areas in the Solomon Islands and flew passenger and cargo routes to New Zealand, Australia, Fiji, and New Caledonia. From August 1943 to July 1944, it was attached to the South Pacific Combat Air Transport Command (SCAT), earning a Navy Unit Commendation. The group also moved personnel of Thirteenth Air Force units to the Southwest Pacific theater. Supported campaigns in New Guinea and the Philippines by transporting men and cargo to combat areas, evacuating casualties, and landing or dropping supplies for guerrilla forces. On 23 February 1945, dropped paratroops at Laguna de Bay, Luzon, to free civilian internees held by the Japanese.

Earned a Distinguished Unit Citation for transporting ammunition, food, and other supplies to Eighth Army forces in Mindanao and for landing on jungle airstrips to evacuate wounded personnel from Apr to Jun. From the Philippines, ferried occupation troops to Japan, evacuated liberated prisoners, and flew cargo and passenger routes to Japan and Australia.

From June 1949 until 1 April 1951, when it was called the active duty, the group trained as a reserve troop carrier unit in Oregon.

In Mar and April 1952, moved to Japan for operations against communist forces in Korea. Using C-119s, the group dropped paratroops and supplies, transported personnel and equipment, and evacuated casualties. On 1 January 1953, relieved from active duty and inactivated in Japan.

It activated again as a reserve unit, training for airlift, air evacuation, and aeromedical evacuation missions until inactivation in 1959. From 1992, the group flew Air Force Reserve airlift and weather reconnaissance missions, including Hurricane Hunter missions.

=== Lineage ===
- Established as 403rd Troop Carrier Group on 7 December 1942

Activated on 12 December 1942
Inactivated on 15 October 1946

- Redesignated 403rd Troop Carrier Group, Medium on 10 May 1949

Activated in the Reserve on 27 June 1949
Ordered to active service on 1 April 1951
Inactivated on 1 January 1953

- Activated in the Reserve on 1 January 1953

Inactivated on 14 April 1959
Redesignated: 403rd Military Airlift Group on 31 July 1985 (Remained inactive)
Redesignated: 403rd Operations Group on 1 August 1992

- Activated in the Reserve on 1 August 1992.

=== Assignments ===
- I Troop Carrier Command, 12 December 1942
- 50th Troop Carrier Wing, 1 May 1943
- XIII Air Force Service Command, September 1943
- Far East Air Service Command, 13 December 1945
- 322d Troop Carrier Wing, 1 January 1946
- 54th Troop Carrier Wing, 26 January – 15 October 1946
- 403rd Troop Carrier Wing, 27 June 1949 – 1 January 1953; 1 January 1953 – 14 April 1959
- 403rd Airlift Wing (later, 403 Wing), 1 August 1992–present

=== Components ===
- 6th Troop Carrier Squadron: 15 May – 15 October 1946
- 9th Troop Carrier Squadron: 31 May – 15 October 1946
- 13th Troop Carrier Squadron: 22 August 1943 – 15 October 1946
- 19th Troop Carrier Squadron: 31 May – 15 October 1946
- 53rd Weather Reconnaissance Squadron: 1 November 1993–present
- 63rd Troop Carrier Squadron: 12 December 1942 May-15 May 1946 (detached 10 October 1943 – 3 July 1944); 27 June 1949 – 1 January 1953; 1 January 1953 – 14 April 1959
- 64th Troop Carrier Squadron: 12 December 1942 May-15 May 1946; 27 June 1949 – 1 January 1953; 1 January 1953 – 14 April 1959
- 65th Troop Carrier Squadron: 12 December 1942 – 26 July 1943; 20 February 1945 – 27 January 1946; 27 June 1949 – 1 January 1953; 1 January 1953 – 16 November 1957
- 66th Troop Carrier Squadron: 12 December 1942 – 21 July 1943; 20 February 1945 – 15 January 1946; 27 June 1949 – 17 April 1951
- 815th Airlift Squadron: 1 August 1992–present.

=== Stations ===
- Bowman Field, Kentucky, 12 December 1942
- Alliance Army Air Field, Nebraska, 18 December 1942
- Pope Field, North Carolina, 3 May 1943
- Baer Field, Indiana, 20 June 1943
- Camp Stoneman, California, 18 July – 24 August 1943
- Pekoa Airfield, Espiritu Santo, New Hebrides, 15 September 1943
- Momote Airfield, Los Negros, Admiralty Islands, 30 August 1944
- Mokmer Airfield, Biak, Netherlands East Indies, 4 October 1944
- Undeterined Location, Leyte, Philippines, 25 June 1945
- Clark Field, Luzon, Philippines, 1 February 1946
- Manila Airport, Luzon, Philippines, c. June-15 October 1946
- Portland Municipal Airport, Oregon, 27 June 1949 – 29 March 1952
- Ashiya AB, Japan, 14 April 1952 – 1 January 1953
- Portland International Airport, Oregon, 1 January 1953
- Selfridge AFB, Michigan, 16 November 1957 – 14 April 1959
- Keesler AFB, Mississippi, 1 August 1992–present

=== Aircraft ===
- C-47, 1942–1946; C/VC-47, 1952; TC-47, 1957–1959
- C-46, 1945–1946; C/TC-46, 1949–1952
- C-54, 1952
- C-119, 1952, 1957–1959
- C-46, 1953–1957
- C-130, 1992–present; WC-130, 1992–present
