= Keesler Air Force Base =

US Air Force base in Biloxi, Mississippi

- Biloxi, Mississippi in United States of America
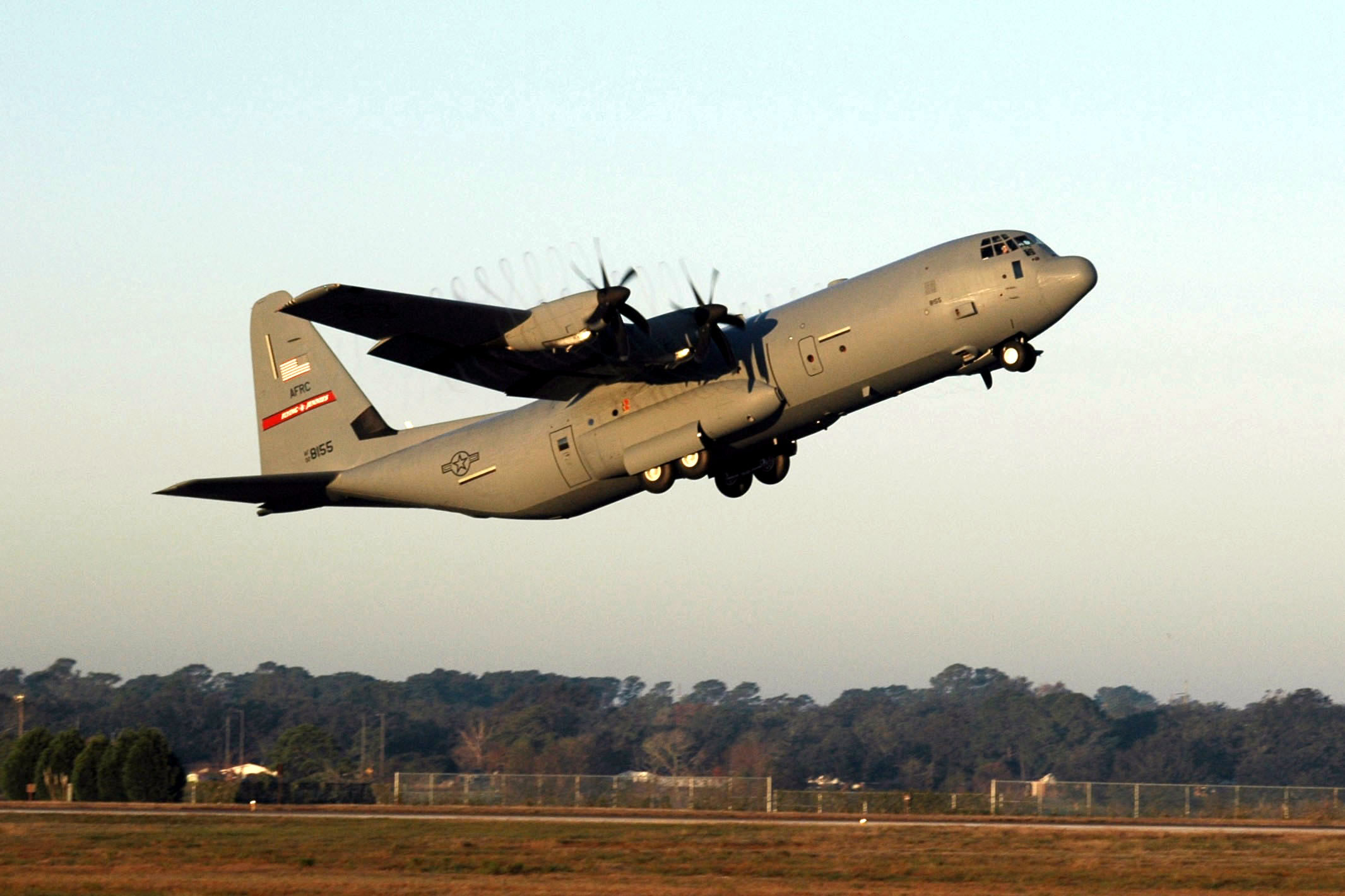
- A C-130J-30 Super Hercules of the 815th Airlift Squadron takes off from Keesler AFB

Site information
- Type: US Air Force Base
- Owner: Department of Defense
- Operator: US Air Force
- Controlled by: Air Education and Training Command (AETC)
- Condition: Operational
- Website: www.keesler.af.mil

Location
- Location within North America Location within the United States Location within Mississippi
- Coordinates: 30°24′41″N 88°55′25″W

Site history
- Built: 1941 (as Keesler Field)
- In use: 1941 – present

Garrison information
- Garrison: 81st Training Wing (host wing); 403rd Wing

Airfield information
- Identifiers: IATA: BIX, ICAO: KBIX, FAA LID: BIX, WMO: 747686
- Elevation: 9.9 m (32.6 ft) AMSL
Runways
Direction	Length and surface
03/21	2,326 m (7,631 ft) PEM

Keesler Air Force Base (IATA: BIX, ICAO: KBIX, FAA LID: BIX) is a United States Air Force base located in Biloxi, Mississippi, a city along the Gulf Coast in Harrison County, Mississippi, United States. The base is named in honor of aviator 2d Lt Samuel Reeves Keesler, a Mississippi native killed in France during World War I. The base is home of the Second Air Force (2 AF) Headquarters and the 81st Training Wing (81 TW) of the Air Education and Training Command (AETC).

The base has specialized in ground trade training since its opening in 1941 during World War II. It has had high-quality technical schools and absorbed units moved from other bases under the Base Realignment and Closure Act (BRAC).

== History ==
In early January 1941, Biloxi city officials assembled a formal offer to invite the United States Army to build a base to support the World War II training buildup. The War Department activated Army Air Corps Station No. 8, Aviation Mechanics School, Biloxi, Mississippi, on 12 June 1941. On August 25, 1941, the base was dedicated as Keesler Army Airfield, in honor of 2d Lt Samuel Reeves Keesler Jr., a Mississippi native and distinguished aerial observer, killed in action in France during the First World War.

Congress initially appropriated $6 million for construction at Biloxi and an additional $2 million for equipment. By the time the War Department allocated the funds in April 1941, the projected cost had risen to $9.6 million. On 14 June 1941, the U.S. Army Corps of Engineers awarded contracts totaling $10 million to build Biloxi's technical training school. At the time, it was the most expensive government project to have been undertaken in the State of Mississippi.

Keesler Field 1943 Classbook

When the War Department activated Keesler Field in June 1941, not only was Keesler getting a technical training center, but it would be getting one of the Army's newest replacement, or basic training centers. The first shipment of recruits arrived at Keesler Field on 21 August 1941. Many stayed at Keesler to become airplane and engine mechanics, while others transferred to aerial gunnery or aviation cadet schools. Development of the base stimulated businesses and residential construction in Biloxi.

The Tuskegee Airmen were trained at Keesler. More than 7,000 Black soldiers were stationed at Keesler Field by the autumn of 1943. These soldiers included pre-aviation cadets, radio operators, aviation technicians, bombardiers, and aviation mechanics.

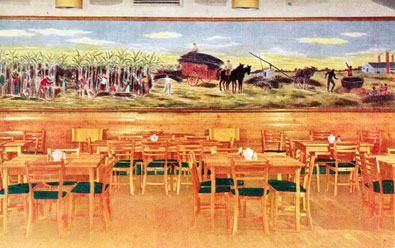
Officers' Club at Keesler Field as it appeared during World War II. "Partial view of the Dining Room, Officers' Club, Keesler Field, Mississippi. The mural scene, painted by Cpl. Claude Marks, shows the harvesting and processing of cane sugar in Louisiana around 1859." Source: U. S. Government postcard. Date of postcard unknown, probably about 1944.

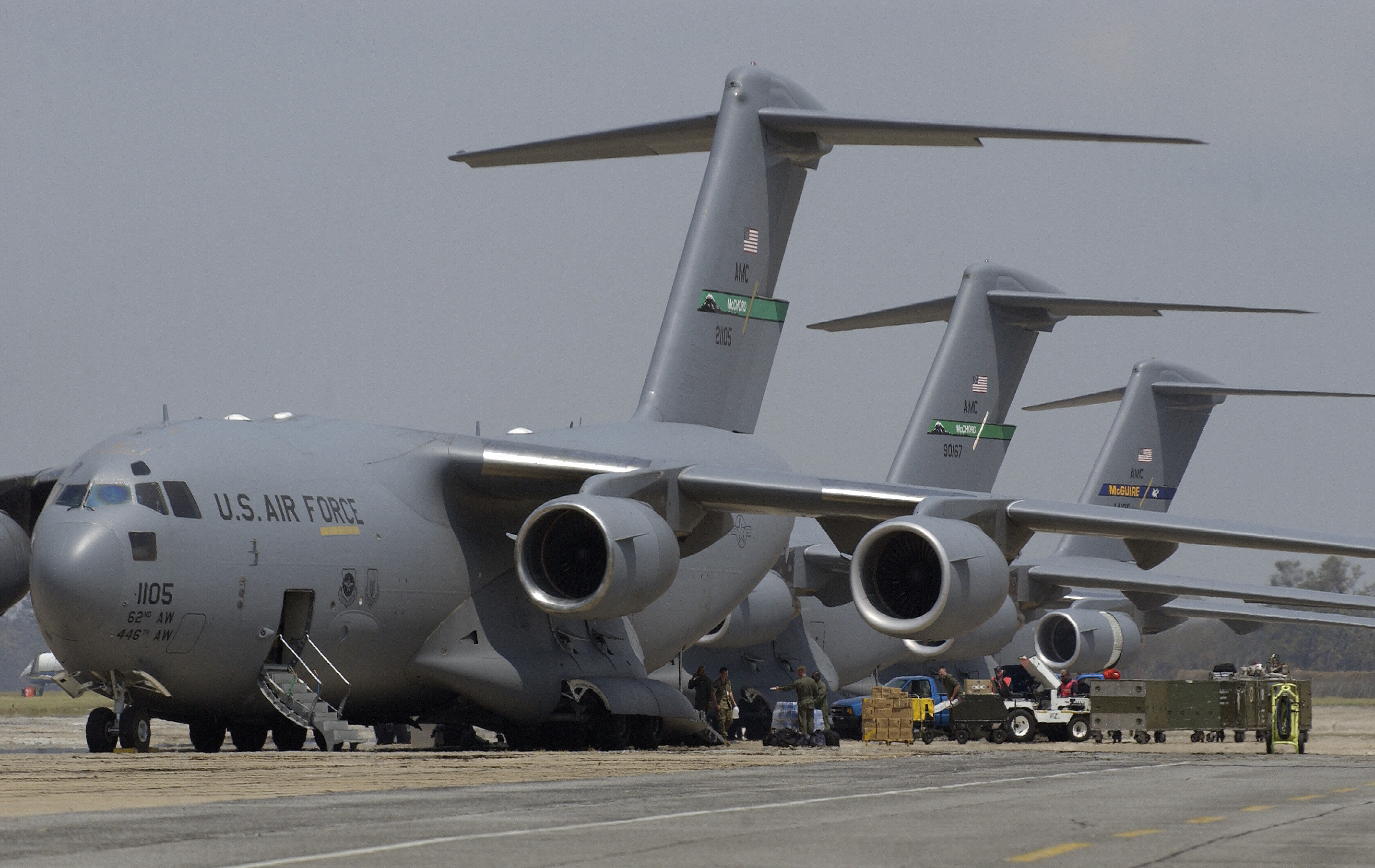
August 31, 2005: C-17 Globemasters unload supplies at Keesler following Hurricane Katrina.

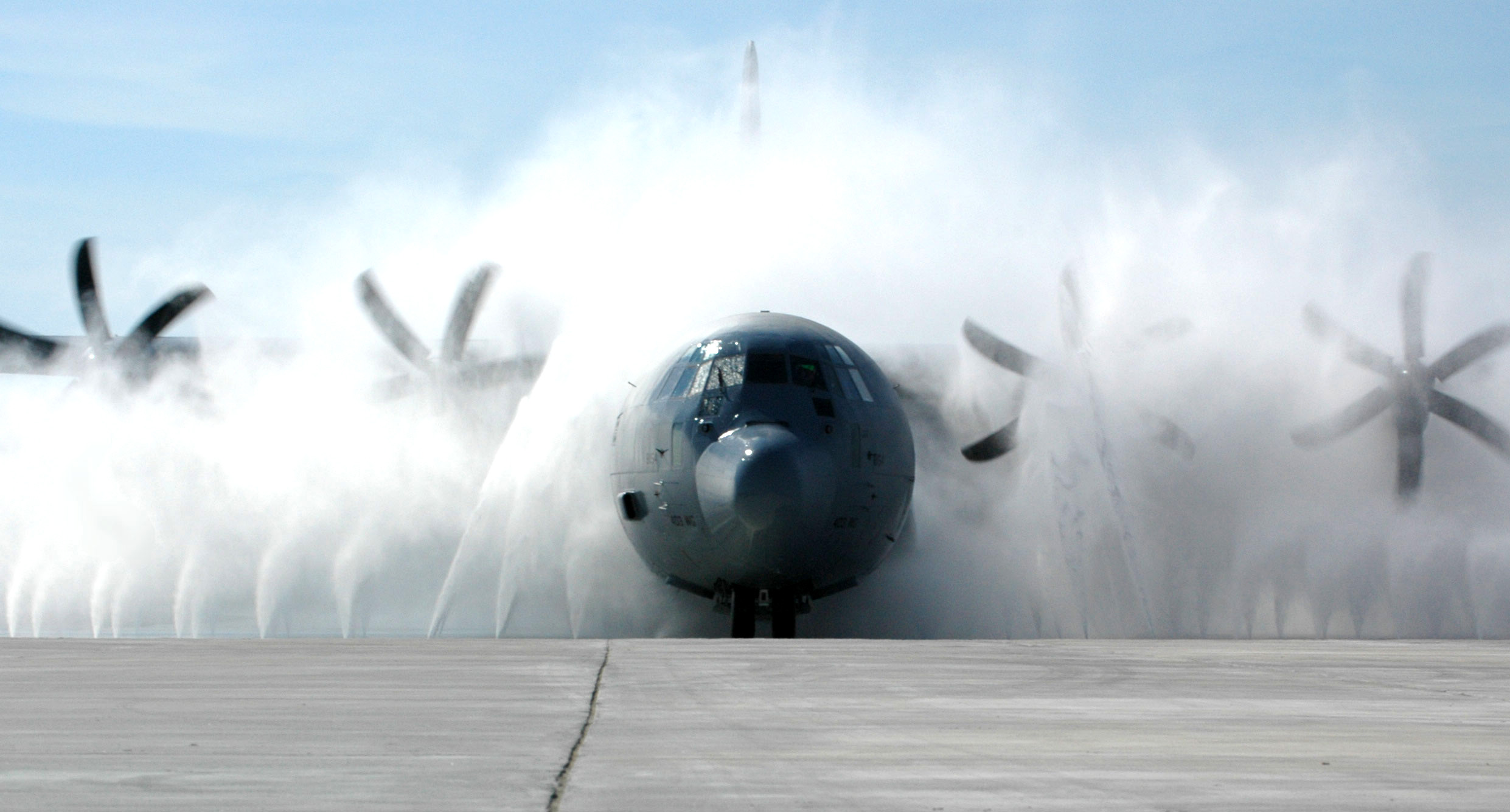
A Lockheed Martin C-130J Super Hercules is cleaned up in the new wash system at Keesler.

Keesler continued to focus upon specialized training in Consolidated B-24 Liberator maintenance until mid-1944. Thereafter, the base expanded its curricula to train mechanics for other aircraft. By September 1944, the number of recruits had dropped, but the workload remained constant. Keesler personnel began processing veteran ground troops and combat crews who had returned from duty overseas for additional training and follow-on assignments. The number of men who went through basic training wound down markedly after the end of World War II, and it was discontinued at Keesler on 30 June 1946.

=== Cold War ===
In late May 1947, the Radar School was established at Keesler (transferred from Boca Raton Army Air Field), making it responsible for operating the two largest military technical schools in the United States. Thereafter, shrinking budgets forced the base to reduce its operating costs: the Airplane and Engine Mechanics School and the Radar School were consolidated on 1 April 1948.

In early 1949, the Radio Operations School transferred to Keesler from Scott Air Force Base, Illinois. In addition to training radio operators, Keesler was to begin teaching air traffic service technicians; aircraft approach controllers, ground radar mechanics, and radar repairman/ground controlled approach specialists. The last mechanics training courses had moved to Sheppard Air Force Base, Texas, by November.

In early 1956, Keesler entered the missile age by opening a ground support training program for the Atlas missile. In 1958, all control tower operator, radio maintenance, and general radio operator courses were put under Keesler's already broad technical training roof.

"Since August 1948, the 3380th Technical Training Wing had controlled all base activities. Under it were four [groups]: the 3380th Technical Training Group, which operated the school; the 3380th Maintenance and Supply Group; the 3380th Air Base Group; and the 3380th Medical Group. In 1955, a fifth group was added—the 3380th Installations Group. That arrangement continued until 1 January 1959, when Air Training Command redesignated the wing as Headquarters, Keesler Technical Training Center (KTTC). At the same time, the training group was redesignated the 3380th Technical School, USAF, and all of its subodinate student squadrons were renamed school squadrons."(81 TRW Brief History 2011)

During the early 1960s, Keesler lost many of its airborne training courses, but it remained the largest training base throughout the 1970s. This included limited flight training operations in the T-28 Trojan for Republic of Vietnam Air Force (VNAF) student pilots.

Hurricane Camille produced considerable damage as it passed over Biloxi in 1969. Most of the Back Bay housing area was under water.

"On 31 May 1972, Air Training Command redesignated the 3380th Technical School as the USAF School of Applied Aerospace Sciences. Soon after on 13 December, the school received institutional accreditation from the Southern Association of Colleges and Schools. As a result, Airmen trained at Keesler received a Career Educational Certificate from the newly established Community College of the Air Force. This opportunity was further expanded in April 1977, when Keesler graduates became eligible to apply their technical training towards an Associate of Arts degree."(81 TRW Brief History 2011)

Keesler's student load dropped to an all-time low after the Vietnam War ended. As a result, Air Training Command inactivated the USAF School of Applied Aerospace Sciences on 1 April 1977 and replaced it with the 3300th Technical Training Wing, which activated the same day.

During the early 1980s Keesler's air traffic control program garnered publicity when the Professional Air Traffic Controllers Organization walked off the job in August 1981. When President Ronald Reagan fired the strikers, Keesler-trained military air traffic controllers were used to direct some of the nation's air traffic. As the air traffic control school it was also the logical location for the USAF Combat Controllers.

Keesler AFB was the primary training base for many avionics maintenance career fields, including Electronic Warfare, Navigational Aids, Computer Repair and Ground Radio Repair. It was also the primary training base for most USAF administrative career fields.

=== From the 1990s ===
Driven by defense budget cuts, base closures following the end of the Cold War forced an end to technical training at Chanute Air Force Base, Illinois, and Lowry Air Force Base, Colorado, when those bases were closed by Base Realignment and Closure Commission (BRAC) actions. Keesler acquired Chanute's weather forecasting courses and Lowry's meteorology and precision measurement equipment laboratory training programs during 1992 and 1993.

Massive restructuring of the Air Force in the early 1990s also meant several changes for Keesler associate units. The first occurred when the 53d Weather Reconnaissance Squadron was inactivated in the active duty Air Force, transferred to the Air Force Reserve and reactivated on 30 June 1991.

On 1 July 1993, the Air Training Command (ATC) was redesignated the Air Education and Training Command (AETC) and the command reactivated Second Air Force (2nd AF), stationing it at Keesler. Second Air Force's mission is to oversee all technical training conducted within AETC. The same day, Keesler Training Center was inactivated, and the 81st Training Wing arrived at the base. The 45th Airlift Squadron (45 AS), part of the 314th Airlift Wing at Little Rock AFB, Arkansas, was also located at Keesler. The 45th AS provided flight crew training in the C-21 Learjet until 2007, when it moved to Scott AFB.

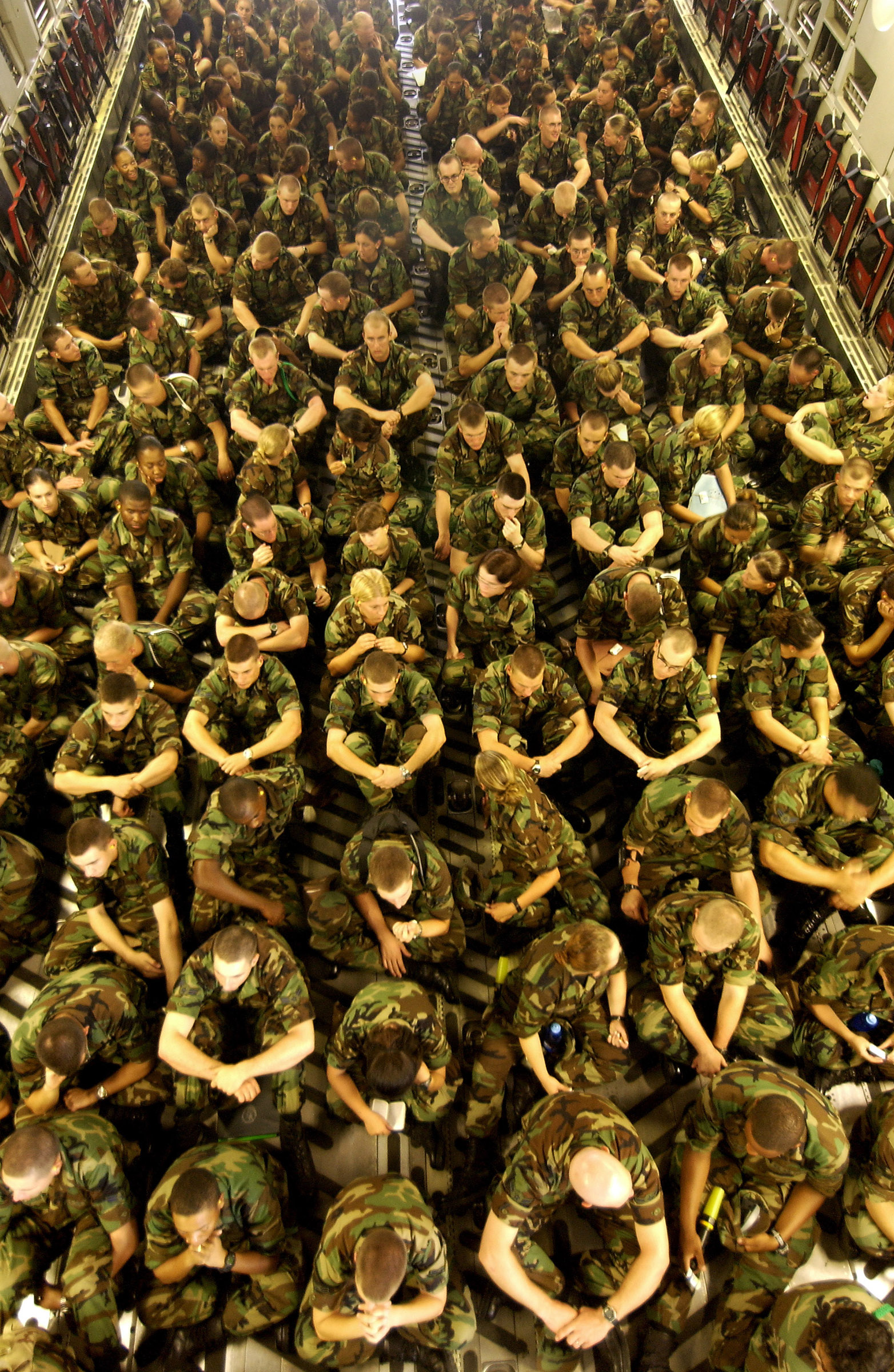
Keesler students evacuated to Sheppard Air Force Base on a C-17

On 29 August 2005 Keesler sustained a direct hit from Hurricane Katrina, which made its third Gulf Coast landfall as a Category 3 storm approximately 30 miles (48 km) to the west. Although non-essential personnel and Hurricane Hunter planes had been evacuated in advance, "drastic damage" was sustained by the base's industrial and housing areas. Due to storm surge about 50% of the base came under water; the commissary, base exchange, and some base housing units were flooded with more than six feet of water. By August 31, however, relief flights were landing at the base. On September 1 the first set of Airmen were evacuated to Sheppard AFB, TX. Other Airmen reached Sheppard AFB the next day, where they were welcomed and given basic items.

=== Units today ===
From 1993, the 81 TRW has provided technical training of airmen in select skill areas immediately following their completion of basic training, as well as providing additional or recurrent training. On average, Keesler has 3,100 students on base at a time. Much of the training they receive is in the field of electronics, such as wideband maintenance, ground radio, information technology, avionics, cryptography. The wing also trains meteorology personnel, radar operations, air traffic control, Aviation Resource Management (ARMS), and tropical cyclone forecasting. Keesler AFB is one of the largest technical training wings in AETC, with four training squadrons located in the training building complex known as "the triangle," the 334th, 335th, 336th, and the 338th. The 81st Medical Group is also located at the base and operates the second largest medical center in the Air Force.

The Air Force Reserve Command's 403d Wing is also on base, and is an Air Mobility Command (AMC)-gained composite unit. It has an airlift squadron (the 815th Airlift Squadron), and the 53rd Weather Reconnaissance Squadron, a WC-130 unit known as the "Hurricane Hunters."

Finally, Keesler is also home to CNATTU Keesler (Center for Naval Aviation Technical Training Unit), a training unit for U.S. Navy and U.S. Marine Corps enlisted personnel receiving training at Keesler, such as enlisted meteorology training, with their Air Force counterparts.

== Names, commands to which assigned, and units ==
=== Previous names ===
- Biloxi Air Corps Technical School, 13 June 1941
- Keesler Army Airfield, 25 August 1941
- Keesler Air Force Base, 13 January 1948 – Present

=== Major commands to which assigned ===
- Air Corps Technical Training Command, 7 Feb 1941

Re-designated: Army Air Forces Technical Training Command, 1 March 1942

- Army Air Forces Flying Training Command, 7 July 1943

Re-designated: Army Air Forces Training Command, 31 July 1943

- Air Training Command, 1 July 1946
- Air Education and Training Command, 1 July 1993 – Present

=== Major units assigned ===
- HQ and HQ Sq, 69th Air Base Group, 12 June 1941
- 59th Air Base Squadron, 4 August 1941

Re-designated: 59th Base HQ and Air Base Squadron, 22 June 1942

- 51st Training Group, 5 August 1941 – 30 April 1944
- 52d Training Group, 6 August 1941 – 30 April 1944
- 55th Training Group, 29 August 1941 – 30 April 1944
- 56th Training Group, 21 July 1941 – 30 April 1944
- 57th Training Group, 5 March 1942 – 30 April 1944
- 58th Training Group, 22 February 1943 – 30 April 1944
- 59th Training Group, 22 February 1943 – 30 April 1944
- 60th Training Group, 22 February 1943 – 30 April 1944
- Army Air Forces Basic Training Center #2, 14 August 1941 – 1 August 1947
- Air Corps (later Air Forces, later USAF) Technical School, 14 August 1941 – 15 August 1973
- Air Corps (later Air Forces) Mechanics School #2, 5 August 1941 – 30 April 1944
- Air Corps (later Air Forces) Mechanics School #7, 13 April – 3 June 1942
- 602d Training Group, 13 April 1942 – 30 April 1944
- 603d Training Group, 5 March 1942 – 30 April 1944
- 607th Training Group, 15 April 1942 – 30 April 1944
- 611th Training Group, 23 July 1943 – 29 February 1944
- 1169th Training Group, 18 December 1942 – 30 April 1944
- 1170th Training Group, 18 December 1942 – 30 April 1944
- 21st Training Wing, 22 February 1943 – 29 February 1944
- 61st Training Wing, 23 July 1943 – 30 April 1944
- 3704th AAF (later AF) Base Unit, 1 May 1944 – 22 August 1948
- 3380th Technical Training Wing, 26 August 1948

Later: Keesler Technical Training Center, 30 April 1976 – 30 June 1993

- 8605th (later 8625th) Technical Training Wing, 26 June 1949 – 28 May 1951
- Air Force Processing Center, Keesler, 27 September 1950 – 16 February 1978
- 11th Weather Squadron, 20 April 1952 – 18 November 1957
- USAF Air-Ground Operations School, 25 January 1957 – 1 November 1973
- 53d Weather Reconnaissance Squadron, 1 July 1973 – 30 Jun 1991, 1 Nov 1993 – present
- 403d Wing (Air Force Reserve Command), 1 Nov 1983 – present
- 81st Training Wing, 1 July 1993 – present

== Based units ==
Flying and notable non-flying units based at Keesler Air Force Base.

Units marked GSU are Geographically Separate Units, which although based at Keesler, are subordinate to a parent unit based at another location.

=== US Air Force ===
Air Education and Training Command (AETC)

- Second Air Force
  - Headquarters Second Air Force
  - 81st Training Wing (Host wing)
    - Headquarters 81st Training Wing
    - 81st Training Group
      - 81st Training Support Squadron
      - 333rd Training Squadron
      - 334th Training Squadron
      - 335th Training Squadron
      - 336th Training Squadron
      - 338th Training Squadron
    - 81st Medical Group
    - 81st Mission Support Group
      - 81st Communications Squadron
      - 81st Contracting Squadron
      - 81st Force Support Squadron
      - 81st Logistics Readiness Squadron
      - 81st Security Forces Squadron
      - 81st Infrastructure Support Division

Air Combat Command (ACC)

- Civil Air Patrol
  - Colonel Berta A Edge Composite Squadron
- Sixteenth Air Force
  - 688th Cyberspace Wing
    - 38th Cyberspace Engineering Installation Group
      - 85th Engineering Installation Squadron (GSU)

Air Force Reserve Command (AFRC)

- Twenty-Second Air Force
  - 403rd Wing
    - Headquarters 403rd Wing
    - 403rd Aeromedical Staging Squadron
    - 403rd Operations Group
      - 36th Aeromedical Evacuation Squadron
      - 53rd Weather Reconnaissance Squadron – WC-130J Super Hercules
      - 403rd Operations Support Flight
      - 815th Airlift Squadron – C-130J Super Hercules
    - 403rd Maintenance Group
      - 403rd Maintenance Squadron
      - 403rd Aircraft Maintenance Squadron
      - Detachment 1
    - 403rd Mission Support Group
      - 41st Aerial Port Squadron
      - 403rd Communications Flight
      - 403rd Force Support Squadron
      - 403rd Logistics Readiness Squadron
      - 403rd Security Forces Squadron

=== US Navy ===
- CNATTU Keesler

=== US Marine Corps ===
- Keesler Marine Detachment

=== US Space Force ===
- 533rd Training Squadron Detachment 2

== See also ==
- Mississippi World War II Army Airfields
- Eastern (later Western) Technical Training Command
