= 815th Airlift Squadron =

United States Air Force air transport squadron

815th Airlift Squadron

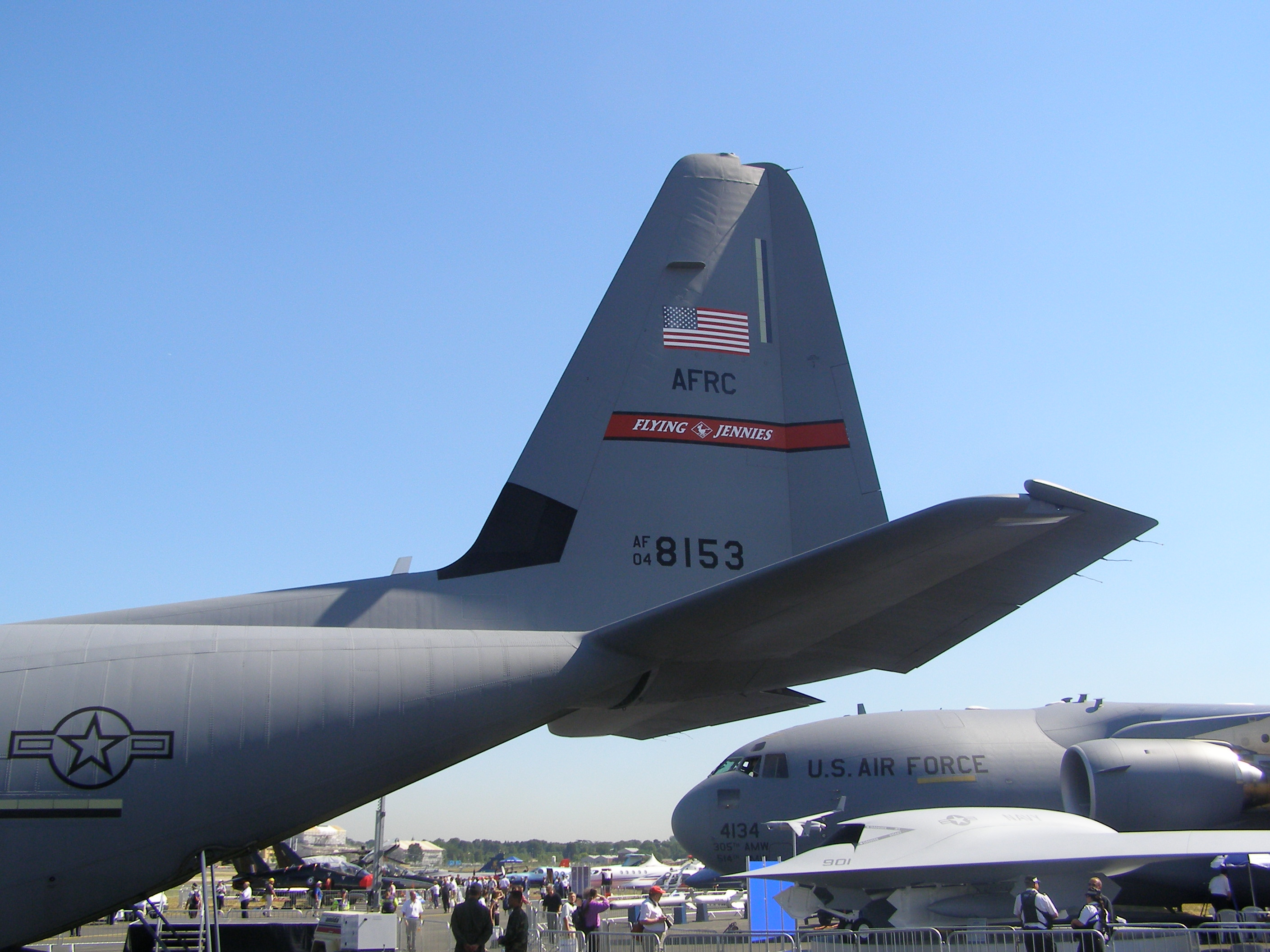
- 815th Airlift Squadron C-130J tail showing the Flying Jennies tail band (Note: Aircraft is Lockheed C-130J-30 Hercules, serial 04-8153.)
- Active: 1943–1945; 1953–1969; 1973–present
- Country: United States
- Branch: United States Air Force
- Role: Airlift
- Part of: Air Force Reserve Command
- Garrison/HQ: Keesler Air Force Base, Mississippi
- Nicknames: Flying Jennies, Storm Trackers (1976–1987)
- Engagements: Mediterranean Theater of Operations; Korean War
- Decorations: Distinguished Unit Citation; Air Force Outstanding Unit Award with Combat "V" Device; Air Force Outstanding Unit Award; Republic of Korea Presidential Unit Citation; Republic of Vietnam Gallantry Cross with Palm

Insignia
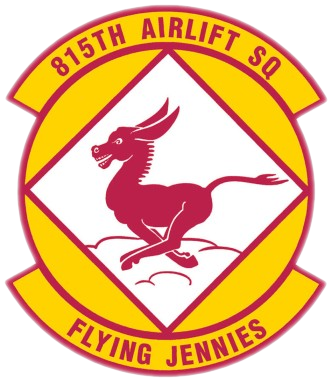
- Emblem of the 815th Airlift Squadron (Note: Reinstated and modified in 1988.)

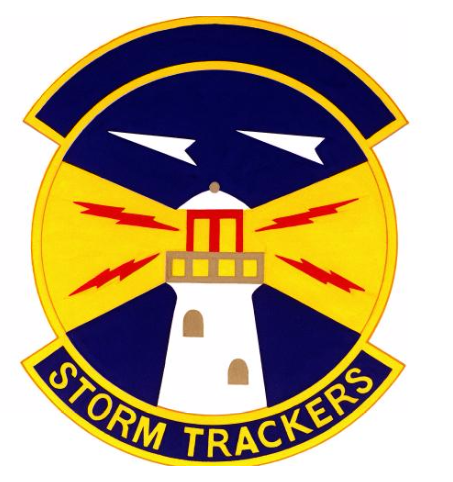
- 815th Weather Reconnaissance Squadron emblem

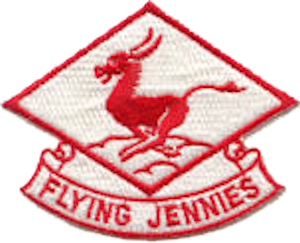
- 815th Troop Carrier Squadron emblem (Note: Approved 28 April 1960. Description: On a white rhombic diamond bordered red, a white cloud formation issuing from base, edges and details red, surmounted by a running jenny ass in profile, silhouetted red, her eyes, teeth and nostrils indicated white.)

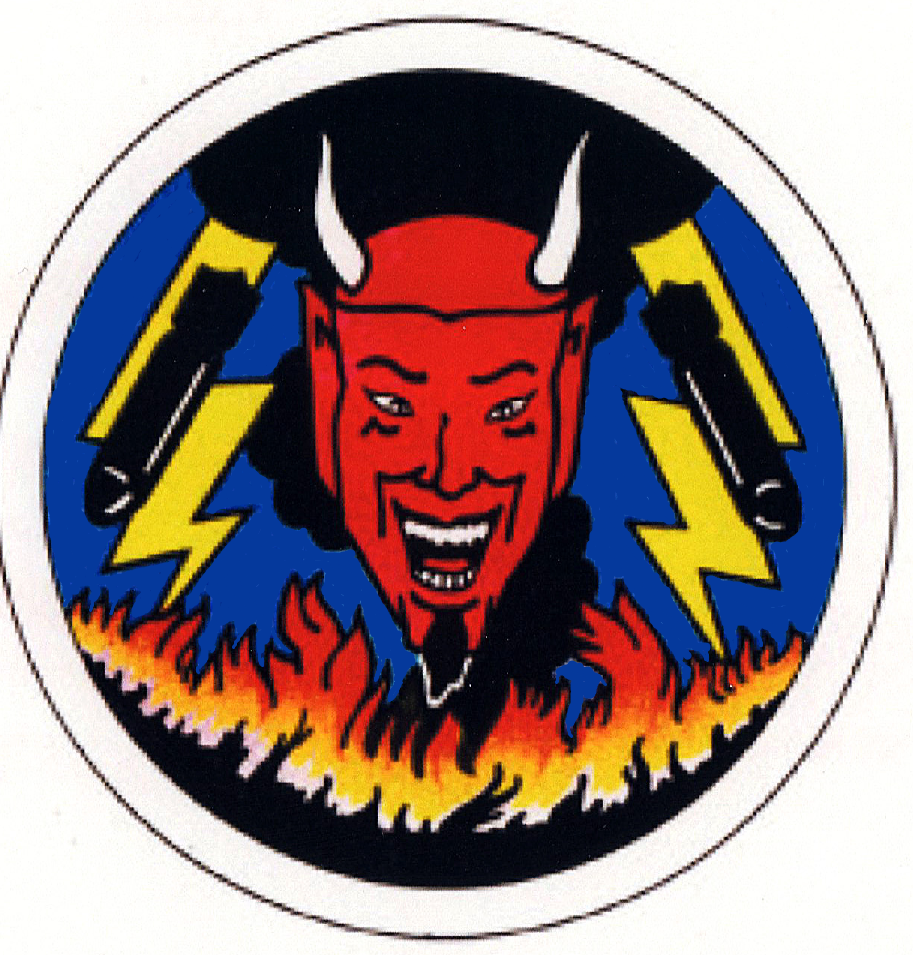
- 815th Bombardment Sq emblem (unofficial)

The 815th Airlift Squadron is a flying unit of the United States Air Force assigned to the Air Force Reserve Command and part of the 403d Wing at Keesler Air Force Base, Mississippi. It operates Lockheed C-130J Hercules aircraft providing global airlift.

During World War II as the 815th Bombardment Squadron, it was one of the last Boeing B-17 Flying Fortress heavy bomber squadrons deployed to Southern Italy as part of the Fifteenth Air Force 483d Bombardment Group in March 1944 The squadron earned two Distinguished Unit Citations in combat over Germany. After the war, it helped transport American soldiers returning to the United States until it was inactivated in Italy.

The squadron was activated as the 815th Troop Carrier Squadron in 1953 in Japan, when it replaced a reserve unit that had been activated for the Korean War. It airlifted troops and materiel in the Pacific until inactivating in 1969.

Four years later, the squadron was activated in the reserves. It has performed airlift and weather reconnaissance missions from Keesler

== Mission ==
Support the theater commander with the capability to resupply the forces, provide for their airlift requirements and employment operations within the combat zone or forward areas, and when requested, to provide aeromedical/refugee evacuation and augment strategic airlift forces. The unit can perform precision air drop of supplies and paratroopers in all weather conditions either day or night, as well as perform day and night assault zone loadings.

== History ==
=== World War II ===
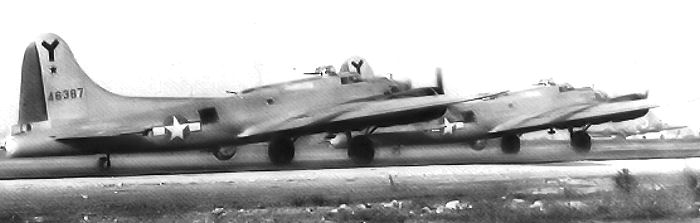
B-17G of the 815th Bombardment Squadron (Note: Aircraft is Douglas Aircraft built Boeing B-17G-50-DL Flying Fortress, serial 44-6387. The plane failed to return from a mission to the Braunkohle-Benzin AG synthetic oil refinery at Schwarzheide, Ruhland, Germany on 22 March 1945. Two crewmembers were killed and eight became prisoners of war. Missing Air Crew Report 13247. The bomber was hit first by Flak, then finished off by a Messerschmitt Me 262. Baugher, Joe (19 July 2023). "1944 USAF Serial Numbers". Joe Baugher.)

The squadron was activated at Ephrata Army Air Base as the 815th Bombardment Squadron (Heavy) on 20 September 1943 as one of the four original squadrons of the 483d Bombardment Group. In November, the squadron moved to MacDill Field, Florida, where it trained with Boeing B-17 Flying Fortresses under Third Air Force.

The 815th deployed to the Mediterranean Theater of Operations, where it became part of Fifteenth Air Force at Sterparone Airfield in Southern Italy. The squadron's air element flew its Flying Fortresses to Sterparone via Tortorella Airfield, while the ground element moved to Sterparone via troop ship. It began operations in April 1944 with an attack on a cement factory in Split, Yugoslavia.

The squadron engaged in long-range strategic bombardment of enemy military, industrial and transport targets, including factories, oil refineries, marshalling yards, airfields, and troop concentrations in Italy, France. Southern Germany, Austria, Czechoslovakia, and the Balkans. In June 1944, the squadron participated in a shuttle mission, departing Italy and landing in the Soviet Union, attacking targets en route and on the return flight. This enabled attacks on targets too far from the squadron's base to strike and return home. The squadron received a Distinguished Unit Citation for combat action two months later. On 18 July 1944 the squadron, along with the other elements of the 483d Group, bombed the objective, an airfield and installations at Memmingen, engaging numerous enemy aircraft in the target area despite a lack of cover from its planned fighter escort. It received a second citation for braving fighter assaults and flak to bomb tank factories at Berlin on 24 March 1945.

The squadron was occasionally diverted from the strategic attack on Germany. It struck targets in southern France in preparation for Operation Dragoon, the invasion of August 1944. The group also supported ground forces in northern Italy during the Allied offensive in April 1945.

After V-E Day, the unit moved to Pisa Airfield, where it operated under the control of Air Transport Command's Green Project which was the movement of troops back to the United States. The squadron carried troops from Pisa to a staging area in Morocco. Its B-17s were disarmed with flooring and seats for 25 passengers installed. It carried passengers from Pisa to Port Lyautey Airfield, French Morocco for further movement them across the Atlantic. The squadron was inactivated in Italy in September 1945.

=== Airlift in the Pacific Area ===
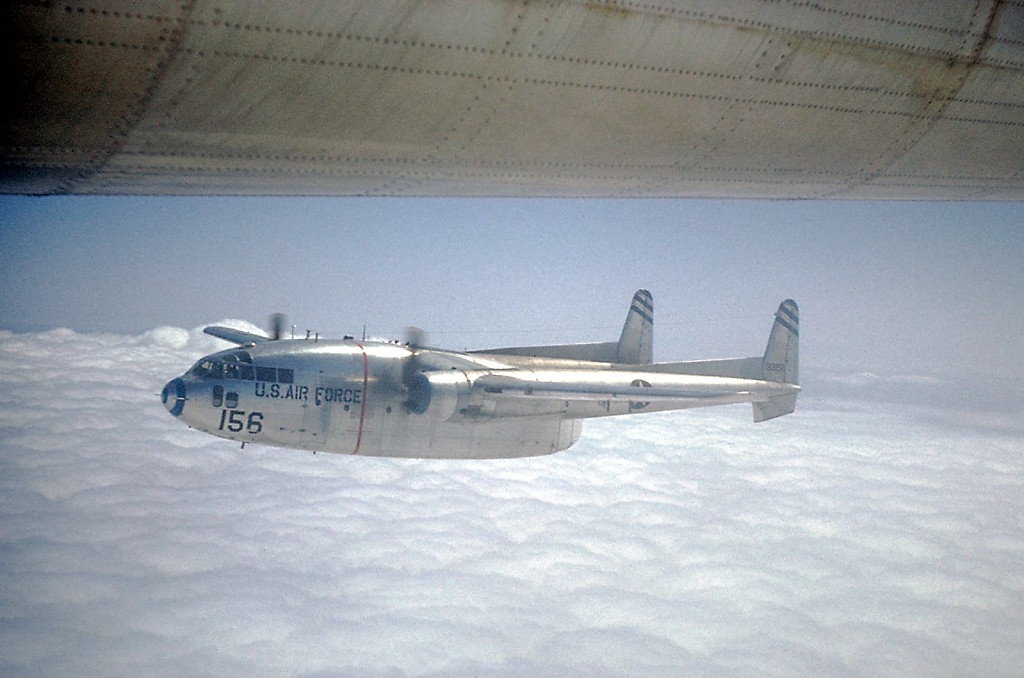
483d Group C-119G Flying Boxcar

The Air Force was returning the 403d Troop Carrier Wing, which was stationed at Ashiya Air Base during the Korean War, to reserve status at the beginning of 1953. The 403d Wing had been mobilized in April 1951 and had moved to Japan a year later. In its place, the Air Force activated the 483d Troop Carrier Wing. The 815th was activated as the 815th Troop Carrier Squadron and absorbed the mission, personnel and Fairchild C-119 Flying Boxcars of the 63d Troop Carrier Squadron, which was simultaneously inactivated. (Note: The squadron adopted the "Flying Jennies" nickname of the 63d as well. See Maurer, Combat Squadrons, p. 242.)

In June 1953, the squadron, along with the other squadrons of the 483d Wing airlifted the 187th Regimental Combat Team from Japan to Korea, to prevent a breakthrough by North Korean and Chinese Communist forces before an armistice agreement could be signed. It performed troop carrier and air transport operations in the Far East, including landing of troops and cargo in forward areas of the combat zone, air transportation of airborne troops and equipment, and air evacuation of casualties, receiving a Korean Presidential Unit Citation for these actions. For its actions in transporting United Nations troops in Korea and training with airborne units, the squadron was one of the first units to earn an Air Force Outstanding Unit Award. Between April 1953 and September 1954, the squadron aided the French Air Force in Indochina by training personnel and hauling supplies. In 1958, the 483d Group was inactivated as Far East Air Forces converted to the dual-deputy organizational model and the squadron was reassigned directly to the wing. That same year, the squadron began conversion to the Lockheed C-130A Hercules, losing its last Flying Boxcar in 1959.

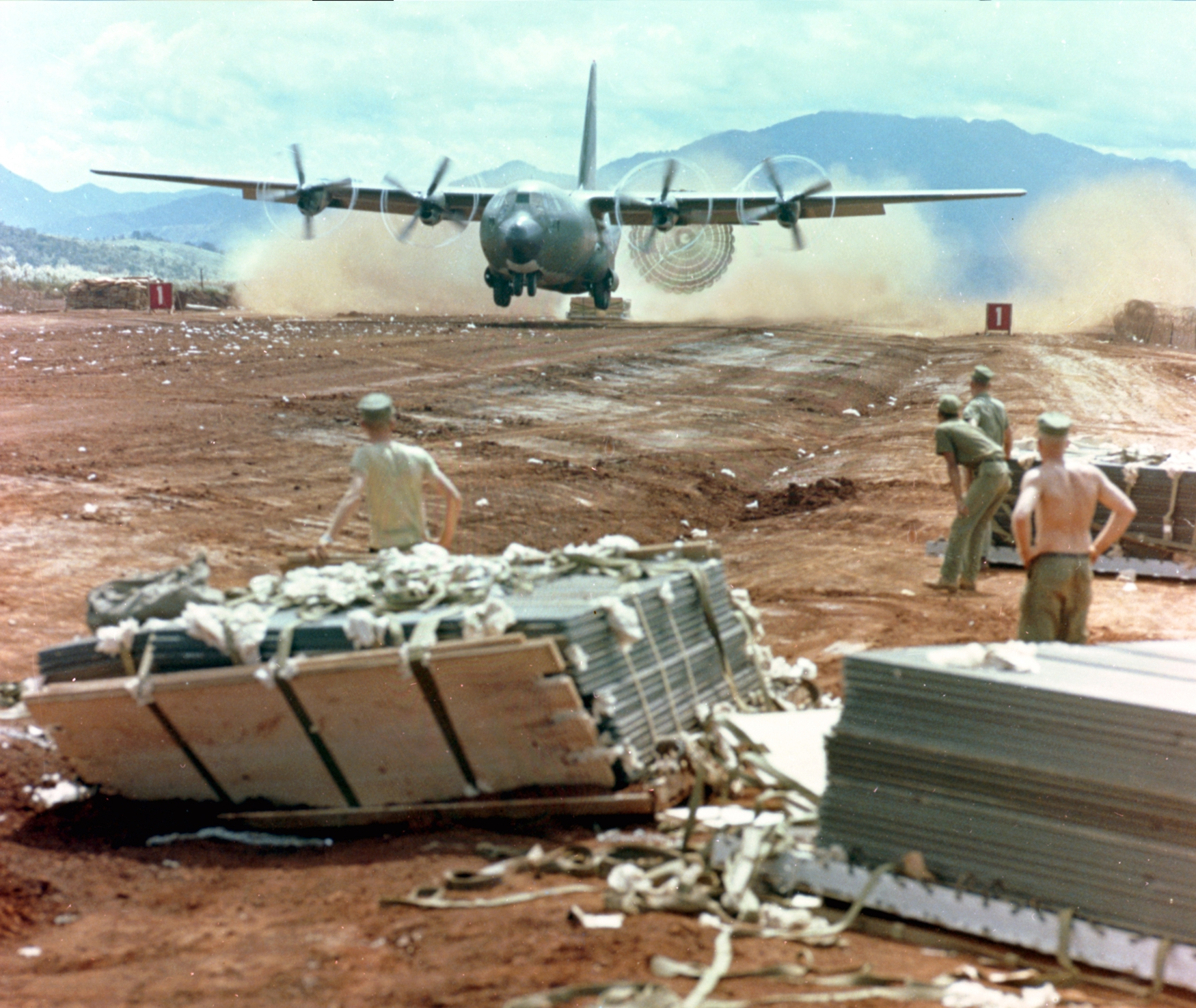
C-130 LAPES drop in Vietnam

On 25 June 1960, the Air Force turned Ashiya Air Base over to the Japanese Air Self Defense Force and the 483d Wing was inactivated. The squadron moved to Tachikawa Air Base, Japan, where it was assigned directly to the 315th Air Division. It continued intratheater transport operations, also flying to locations in the Philippines, Thailand and Indochina, supporting United States civilian and military personnel assigned to the region. As the United States increased its combat presence in Indochina in the early 1960s, made frequent flights to airfields in South Vietnam and to locations within the country, periodically deploying crews and aircraft there. As in South Korea, the flights within South Vietnam were extremely hazardous as the squadron operated within combat areas and frequently were under fire from communist forces during takeoff, landing and ground operations. The squadron inactivated in December 1969.

=== Air Force Reserve ===
Reactivated in April 1973 at Keesler Air Force Base, Mississippi, as a unit of the Air Force Reserve. It performed weather reconnaissance from 1983 to 1987, including flying into hurricanes to collect atmospheric data and retained weather reconnaissance capability until 1992. It had tactical airlift responsibilities from 1973 to 1975 and since 1987. It also took part in Operation Just Cause in Panama, December 1989 – January 1990.

The 815th was selected in May 1999 as the first unit in the U.S. Air Force to take delivery of the C-130J variant and participated heavily in writing the book for "J" model operations. Along with a sister Air Mobility Command unit, the 41st Airlift Squadron, the 815th deployed the C-130J into combat, and bested all previous C-130 squadrons that were previously employed by setting numerous records in the theater for best aircraft availability, missions flown, as well as passengers and cargo carried.

On 6 August 2010 the Air Force activated the 345th Airlift Squadron, an associate squadron composed of active duty personnel, at Keesler and integrated its members in operations of the 815th. On 21 March 2013, the 403rd Wing announced that its C-130J aircraft would be redeploying to Pope Air Force Base, North Carolina, beginning in October 2013 in preparation for inactivation of the 815th. The transfer was delayed in early 2014 because of pending plans to shut down the airlift wing at Pope and the inactivation of the 815th itself delayed on 28 July, then cancelled.

== Lineage ==
- Constituted as the 815th Bombardment Squadron (Heavy) on 14 September 1943

Activated on 20 September 1943
Redesignated 815th Bombardment Squadron, Heavy c. September 1944
Inactivated on 25 September 1945

- Redesignated 815th Troop Carrier Squadron, Medium on 15 November 1952

Activated on 1 January 1953
Redesignated 815th Troop Carrier Squadron on 8 December 1965
Redesignated 815th Tactical Airlift Squadron on 1 August 1967
Inactivated on 15 December 1969

- Activated in the Reserve on 25 April 1973

Redesignated 815th Weather Reconnaissance Squadron on 1 January 1976
Redesignated 815th Tactical Airlift Squadron on 31 December 1987
Redesignated 815th Airlift Squadron on 1 February 1992

=== Assignments ===
- 483d Bombardment Group, 20 September 1943 – 25 September 1945
- 483d Troop Carrier Group, 1 January 1953
- 483d Troop Carrier Wing, 8 December 1958
- 315th Air Division, 25 June 1960
- 374th Tactical Airlift Wing, 1 November 1968 – 15 December 1969
- 920th Tactical Airlift Group (later 920 Weather Reconnaissance Group), 25 April 1973
- 403d Rescue and Weather Reconnaissance Wing (later, 403 Tactical Airlift Wing, 403 Airlift Wing), 1 November 1983
- 403d Operations Group, 1 August 1992 – present

=== Stations ===
- Ephrata Army Air Base, Washington, 20 September 1943
- MacDill Field, Florida, 7 November 1943 – 2 March 1944
- Sterparone Airfield, Italy, 9 April 1944
- Pisa Airfield, Italy, 15 May-25 September 1945
- Ashiya Air Base, Japan, 1 January 1953
- Tachikawa Air Base, Japan, 25 June 1960 – 15 December 1969
- Keesler Air Force Base, Mississippi, 25 April 1973 – present

=== Aircraft ===
- Boeing B-17 Flying Fortress (1943–1945)
- Fairchild C-119 Flying Boxcar (1953–1959)
- Lockheed C-130A Hercules (1958–1969)
- Lockheed C-130E Hercules (1973–1975, 1988–1998)
- WC-130 (1976–1990, 1991–1993)
- C-130J-30 Super Hercules (1998–present)

=== Awards and campaigns ===
| Award streamer | Award | Dates | Notes |
|---|---|---|---|
| | Distinguished Unit Citation | 18 July 1944 | Germany, 815th Bombardment Squadron |
| | Distinguished Unit Citation | 24 March 1945 | Germany, 815th Bombardment Squadron |
| | Air Force Outstanding Unit Award with Combat "V" Device | 1 January 1968-10 November 1969 | 815th Tactical Airlift Squadron |
| | Air Force Outstanding Unit Award | 6 May 1953-10 September 1954 | 815th Troop Carrier Squadron |
| | Air Force Outstanding Unit Award | 1 January 1961-30 June 1961 | 815th Troop Carrier Squadron |
| | Air Force Outstanding Unit Award | 1 July 1964-30 June 1966 | 815th Troop Carrier Squadron |
| | Air Force Outstanding Unit Award | 1 July 1977-31 December 1978 | 815th Weather Reconnaissance Squadron |
| | Air Force Outstanding Unit Award | 1 July 1984-30 June 1986 | 815th Weather Reconnaissance Squadron |
| | Air Force Outstanding Unit Award | 1 May 1992-30 April 1994 | 815th Airlift Squadron |
| | Air Force Outstanding Unit Award | 1 May 1994-30 April 1996 | 815th Airlift Squadron |
| | Air Force Outstanding Unit Award | 1 May 1996-31 August 1997 | 815th Airlift Squadron |
| | Air Force Outstanding Unit Award | 1 January 2004-31 December 2005 | 815th Airlift Squadron |
| | Air Force Outstanding Unit Award | 1 October 2008-30 September 2010 | 815th Airlift Squadron |
| | Air Force Outstanding Unit Award | 1 January 2015-31 December 2017 | 815th Airlift Squadron |
| | Republic of Korea Presidential Unit Citation | 1 January 1953-28 July 1953 | 815th Troop Carrier Squadron |
| | Republic of Vietnam Gallantry Cross with Palm | 1 January 1968-10 November 1969 | 815th Tactical Airlift Squadron |

| Campaign Streamer | Campaign | Dates | Notes |
|---|---|---|---|
| | Air Offensive, Europe | 9 April 1944 – 5 June 1944 | 815th Bombardment Squadron |
| | Normandy | 6 June 1944 – 24 July 1944 | 815th Bombardment Squadron |
| | Northern France | 25 July 1944 – 14 September 1944 | 815th Bombardment Squadron |
| | Rome-Arno | 22 January 1944 – 9 September 1944 | 815th Bombardment Squadron |
| | Southern France | 15 August 1944 – 14 September 1944 | 815th Bombardment Squadron |
| | North Apennines | 10 September 1944 – 4 April 1945 | 815th Bombardment Squadron |
| | Po Valley | 3 April 1945 – 8 May 1945 | 815th Bombardment Squadron |
| | Rhineland | 15 September 1944 – 21 March 1945 | 815th Bombardment Squadron |
| | Central Europe | 9 April 1944 – 21 May 1945 | 815th Bombardment Squadron |
| | Air Combat, EAME Theater | 9 April 1944 – 11 May 1945 | 815th Bombardment Squadron |
| | Third Korean Winter | 1 January 1953 – 30 April 1953 | 815th Troop Carrier Squadron |
| | Korea Summer-Fall 1953 | 1 May 1953 – 27 July 1953 | 815th Troop Carrier Squadron |
| | Just Cause | 20 December 1989 – 31 January 1990 | 815th Tactical Airlift Squadron, Panama |

== See also ==
- List of United States Air Force airlift squadrons
- List of United States Air Force weather reconnaissance squadrons
- List of C-130 Hercules operators
- B-17 Flying Fortress units of the United States Army Air Forces
- Boeing B-17 Flying Fortress Units of the Mediterranean Theater of Operations
