= Bellin =

Bellin may refer to:

- Bellin Building in Wisconsin
- Bellin Run, 10k race in Wisconsin
- Billin, Syria
- Kangirsuk, Quebec

== People ==
- Andy Bellin (born 1968), American director and screenwriter
- Christina Bellin (1937–1988), American model
- Eirlys Bellin, Welsh actress
- Howard Bellin, American author, inventor, and plastic surgeon
- Jana Bellin (born 1947), British-Czechoslovak chess player
- Jacques-Nicolas Bellin (1703–1772), French hydrographer and geographer
- Maurizio Bellin (born 1982), Italian road cyclist
- Melissa Bellin (born 1973), also known as Spice; dancer, valet, and wrestler
- Mildred Grosberg Bellin (1908–2008), American cookbook author
- Robert Bellin (born 1952), British chess master
- Samuel Bellin (1799-1893), English printmaker and engraver

== See also ==
- Belin (disambiguation)
