= 76th Air Refueling Squadron =

US Air Force unit

76th Air Refueling Squadron

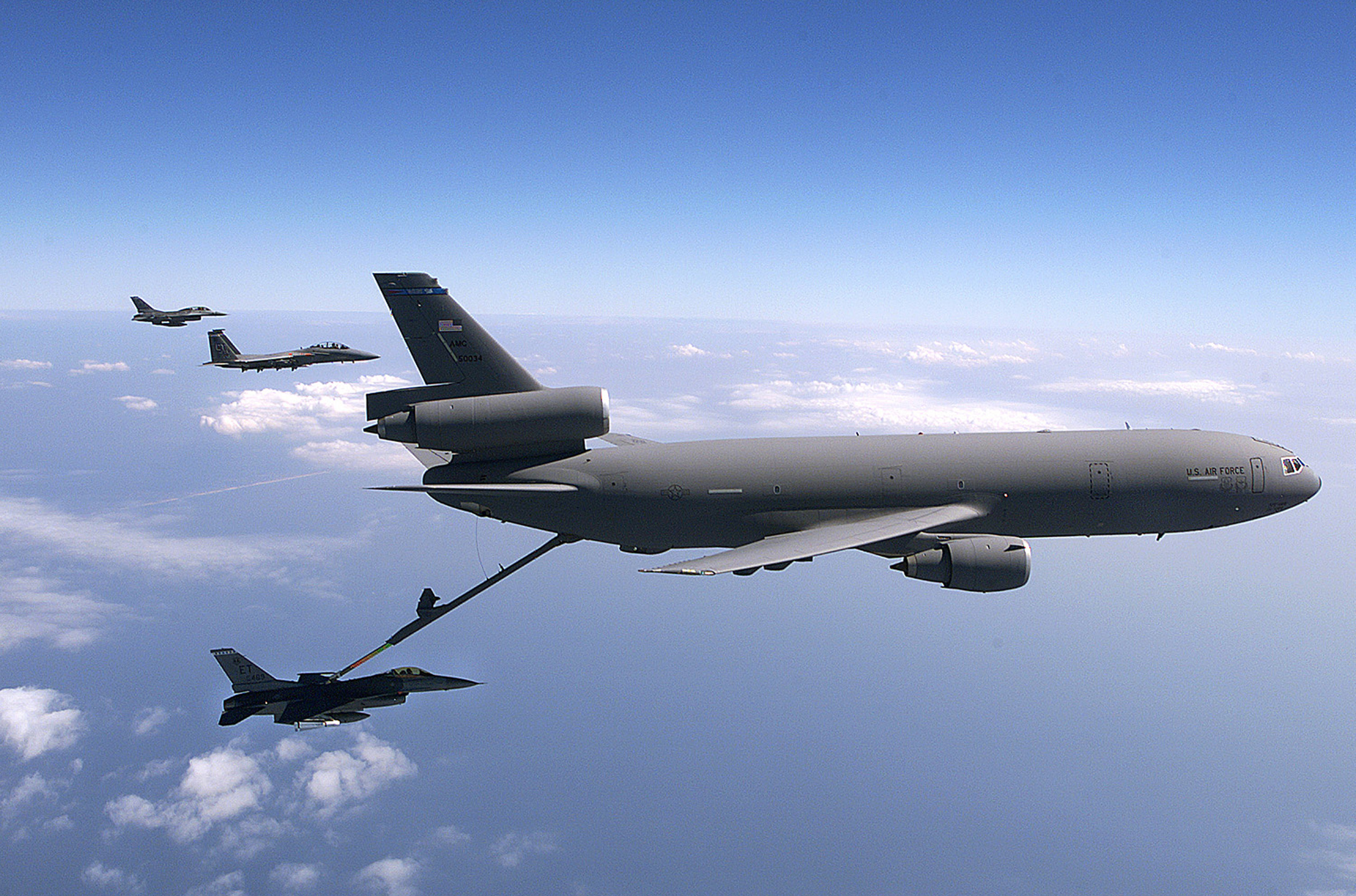
- McGuire AFB KC-10 Extender refueling an F-16 Fighting Falcon with an F-15 Eagle and another F-16 to the side.
- Active: 1943–1945; 1947–1952; 1952–1966; 1994–2023
- Country: United States
- Branch: United States Air Force
- Role: Aerial refueling
- Part of: Air Force Reserve Command
- Garrison/HQ: McGuire Air Force Base
- Engagements: Operation Overlord; Operation Dragoon; Operation Market Garden; Operation Plunder
- Decorations: Distinguished Unit Citation; Air Force Outstanding Unit Award

Insignia
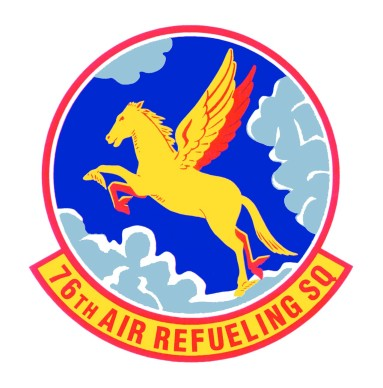
- 76th Air Refueling Squadron emblem (approved 17 April 1996)

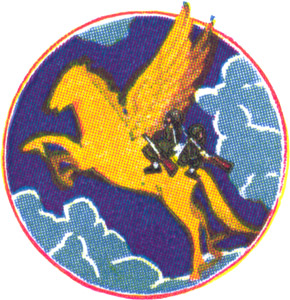
- 76th Troop Carrier Squadron emblem (approved 30 April 1944)

The 76th Air Refueling Squadron is a United States Air Force unit that is part of the 514th Air Mobility Wing at McGuire Air Force Base, New Jersey. It operates the Boeing KC-46A Pegasus aircraft conducting air refueling missions as a reserve associate unit of the 305th Air Mobility Wing.

The unit was first activated as a Douglas C-47 Skytrain transport unit that saw combat with the 435th Troop Carrier Group in Western Europe. The squadron flew paratroopers on airborne assaults on Normandy (Operation Overlord); Southern France (Operation Dragoon); the Netherlands (Operation Market Garden), and Germany (Operation Varsity). It also flew combat resupply missions in the relief of Bastogne in 1945. The 76th was awarded a Distinguished Unit Citation for its actions during the Normandy invasion.

The squadron was activated in the reserve in 1947. It was called to active duty in March 1951 for the Korean War, serving at its home station, Miami International Airport. It returned to reserve duty in December 1952. In November 1959 it was assigned directly to the 435th Troop Carrier Wing in a reorganization of Continental Air Command reserve units.

== History ==
=== World War II ===
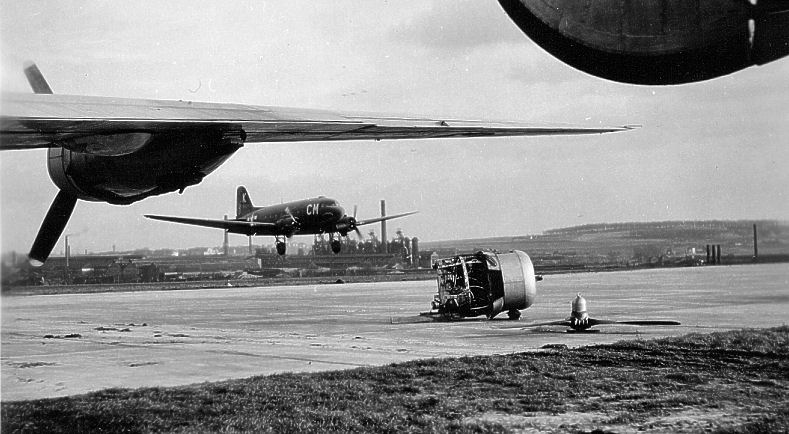
76th Troop Carrier Squadron C-47 landing

The squadron was first activated at Bowman Field, Kentucky in February 1943, as one of the original squadrons of the 435th Troop Carrier Group. The group used Douglas C-47 Skytrains and Douglas C-53 Skytrooopers in preparing for duty overseas with Ninth Air Force.

The 76th left the United States in October 1943, arriving at RAF Langar, England, in early November. On arrival, it began training for participation in the airborne operation over Normandy. The squadron flew its first combat missions on D-Day by dropping paratroopers of 101st Airborne Division near Cherbourg-en-Cotentin. The unit towed Waco CG-4A and Airspeed Horsa gliders carrying reinforcements to the same location that afternoon and on the following morning. The squadron received a Distinguished Unit Citation for its part in Operation Overlord, the Normandy invasion.

The squadron began transport services following the landings in France and intermittently engaged in missions of this type until V-E Day In these operations the 76th hauled supplies such as serum, blood plasma, radar sets, clothing, rations, and ammunition. It also evacuated wounded personnel to Allied hospitals.

The squadron interrupted these supply and evacuation missions to train for and participate in three major airborne assaults. It was part of a detachment of three squadrons from the 435th Group that moved to Tarquinia Airfield, Italy in July 1944 for Operation Dragoon, the invasion of Southern France. The detachment dropped paratroopers over the assault area on 15 August and also released gliders carrying troops and equipment such as jeeps, guns, and ammunition. The following day it flew a resupply mission over France, then transported supplies to bases in Italy before returning to England at the end of the month.

In September 1944 the squadron participated in Operation Market Garden the unsuccessful airborne operation intended to seize bridges across the Meuse River in the Netherlands, dropping paratroops of the 82d and 101st Airborne Divisions and releasing gliders carrying reinforcements. During the Battle of the Bulge, the unit delivered supplies to isolated combat positions of the 101st Airborne and 7th Armored Divisions in Bastogne and Marcouray, Belgium.

The unit moved to Bretigny Airfield, France in February 1945 to prepare for Operation Varsity, the airborne assault across the Rhine River. Each squadron aircraft participating in this operation towed two gliders transporting troops and equipment to the east bank of the Rhine near Wesel on 24 March. The unit then flew resupply missions to Germany in support of ground forces.

The squadron transported supplies to occupation forces in Germany and evacuated Allied prisoners of war after V-E Day. The squadron and the 435th Group returned to the United States in August and the group was inactivated on 15 November 1945.

=== Air Force Reserve ===
==== Troop carrier operations ====
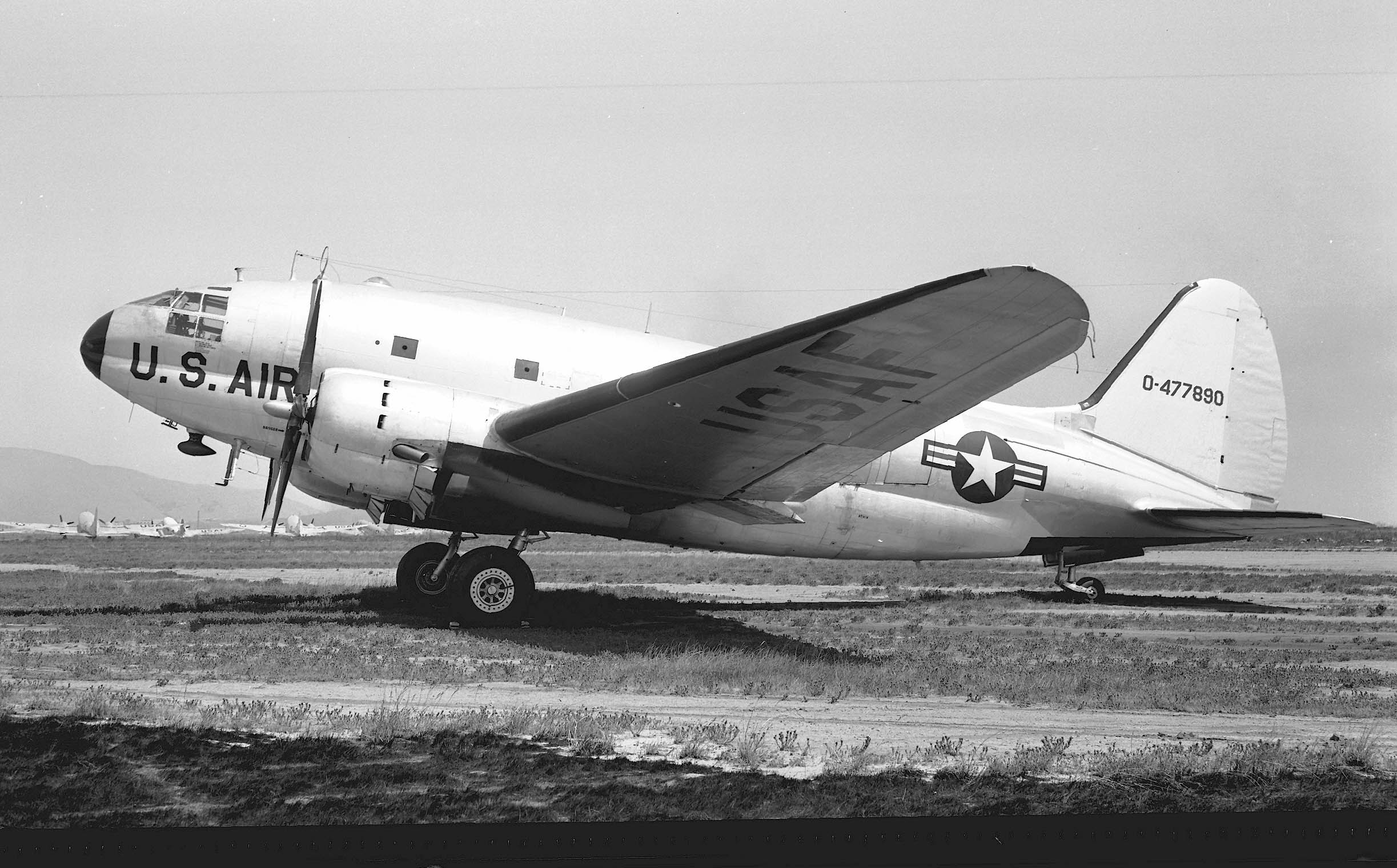
Curtiss C-46D

The squadron was once again activated as a reserve unit under Air Defense Command at Orlando Air Force Base, Florida on 15 July 1947. It was again assigned to the 435th Troop Carrier Group, located at Morrison Field, Florida. The squadron was nominally a Curtiss C-46 Commando unit, but it is not clear to what extent it was equipped with tactical aircraft while at Orlando.

In June 1949, Continental Air Command, which had assumed the responsibility for training reserve units from Air Defense Command in 1948, reorganized its reserve units under the wing base organization system. As part of this reorganization and unit reductions required by President Truman's reduced 1949 defense budget, the 435th Group and its squadrons moved to Miami International Airport, where it was assigned to the newly formed 435th Troop Carrier Wing and formed its cadre from elements of the inactivating 100th Bombardment Group. Air Force flying operations at Orlando came to a temporary end. The squadron was manned at only 25% of the strength of a regular unit.

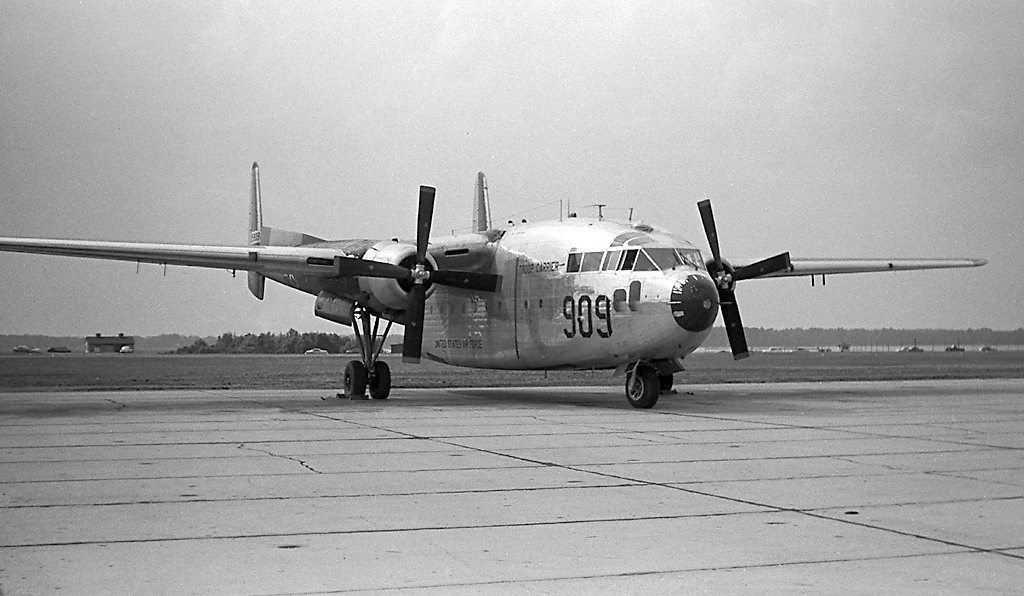
Fairchild C-119G Flying Boxcar

At Miami, the squadron trained with C-46s under the supervision of the active duty 2585th Air Force Reserve Training Center. The squadron was ordered into active service in March 1951 as a result of the Korean War. Along with other reserve units called to active duty, it formed Tactical Air Command's Eighteenth Air Force. The squadron's initial function was to train C-46 aircrews for service in Korea. The 76th also trained with Fairchild C-119 Flying Boxcars. Although it remained at Miami, the unit deployed twice while on active duty: to Laurinburg-Maxton Airport, North Carolina from 21 July until 1 September 1951 and to Grenier Air Force Base, New Hampshire from 2 January to 3 March 1952. It was relieved from active duty and inactivated on 1 December 1952 and its mission, personnel and equipment were transferred to the regular 744th Troop Carrier Squadron, which was activated the same day.

The squadron was activated as a reserve unit the same day at the same station, but with the personnel and equipment of the inactivating 812th Troop Carrier Squadron. In the reserve, the squadron once again flew the Curtiss Commandos. By 1956, the unit was flying overseas missions, particularly in the Caribbean area and in Central America. In addition, for the first time as a reserve unit, its flying was performed in unit tactical aircraft, rather than in trainers.

In 1957, the squadron once again received C-119s.

==== Strategic airlift and air refueling ====
The squadron began strategic airlift operations in 1966, and global air refueling and airlift since 1994.

=== Operations and decorations ===
- Campaigns. World War II: Normandy; Rome-Arno; Southern France; Northern France; Rhineland; Ardennes-Alsace; Central Europe.
- Decorations. Distinguished Unit Citation: France, 5–7 June 1944. Air Force Outstanding Unit Award: 1 October 1995 – 30 September 1997.

== Lineage ==
- Constituted as the 76th Troop Carrier Squadron on 30 January 1943

Activated on 25 February 1943
Inactivated on 15 November 1945

- Activated in the reserve on 15 July 1947

Redesignated 76th Troop Carrier Squadron, Medium on 26 June 1949
Ordered to active service on 1 March 1951
Relieved from active duty on 15 October 1952
Inactivated on 1 December 1952

- Activated in the reserve on 1 December 1952

Discontinued and inactivated, on 1 April 1966

- Redesignated 76th Air Refueling Squadron on 9 September 1994

Activated in the reserve on 1 October 1994

=== Assignments ===
- 435th Troop Carrier Group, 25 February 1943 – 15 November 1945
- 435th Troop Carrier Group, 15 July 1947 – 1 December 1952
- 435th Troop Carrier Group, 1 December 1952
- 435th Troop Carrier Wing, 14 April 1959
- 445th Troop Carrier Wing; 1 October 1961
- 435th Troop Carrier Wing, 27 August 1962
- 915th Troop Carrier Group, 17 January 1963 – 1 April 1966
- 514th Operations Group, 1 October 1994 – present

=== Stations ===
- Bowman Field, Kentucky, 25 February 1943
- Sedalia Army Air Field, Missouri, 4 May 1943
- Pope Field, North Carolina, 2 July 1943
- Baer Field, Indiana, 9–13 October 1943
- RAF Langar (AAF-490), England, 4 November 1943
- RAF Welford (AAF-474), England, January 1944

Detachment operated from Tarquinia Airfield, Italy, 20 July-23 August 1944

- Bretigny Airfield (A-48), France, 19 February–June 1945
- Baer Field, Indiana, 5 August 1945
- Kellogg Field, Michigan, 23 August 1945 – 17 November 1945
- Orlando Army Air Base (later Orlando Air Force Base), Florida, 15 July 1947
- Miami International Airport, Florida, 26 June 1949 – 1 December 1952
- Miami International Airport, 1 December 1952
- Homestead Air Force Base, Florida, 25 July 1960 – 1 April 1966
- McGuire Air Force Base, New Jersey, 1 October 1994 – present

=== Aircraft ===
- Douglas C-53 Skytrooper (1943–1945)
- Douglas C-47 Skytrain (1943–1945)
- Waco CG-4 (1943–1945)
- Airspeed Horsa (1944–1945)
- Consolidated C-109 Liberator Express (1945)
- Curtiss C-46 Commando (1947–1948?, 1949–1951)
- Fairchild C-119 Flying Boxcar (1951–1966)
- Douglas C-124 Globemaster II (1966)
- McDonnell Douglas KC-10 Extender (1994–2022)
- Boeing KC-46A Pegasus (2023- present)
