= 744th Air Refueling Squadron =

United States Air Force ariel refueling unit

The United States Air Force's 744th Air Refueling Squadron (744 ARS) was an aerial refueling unit that operated the McDonnell Douglas KC-10 at Seymour Johnson AFB, North Carolina. The unit was activated on 29 April 1994 to replace the departing 344th Air Refueling Squadron, The unit was inactivated in 1995.
