= McDonnell Douglas KC-10 Extender =

US aerial refueling tanker aircraft

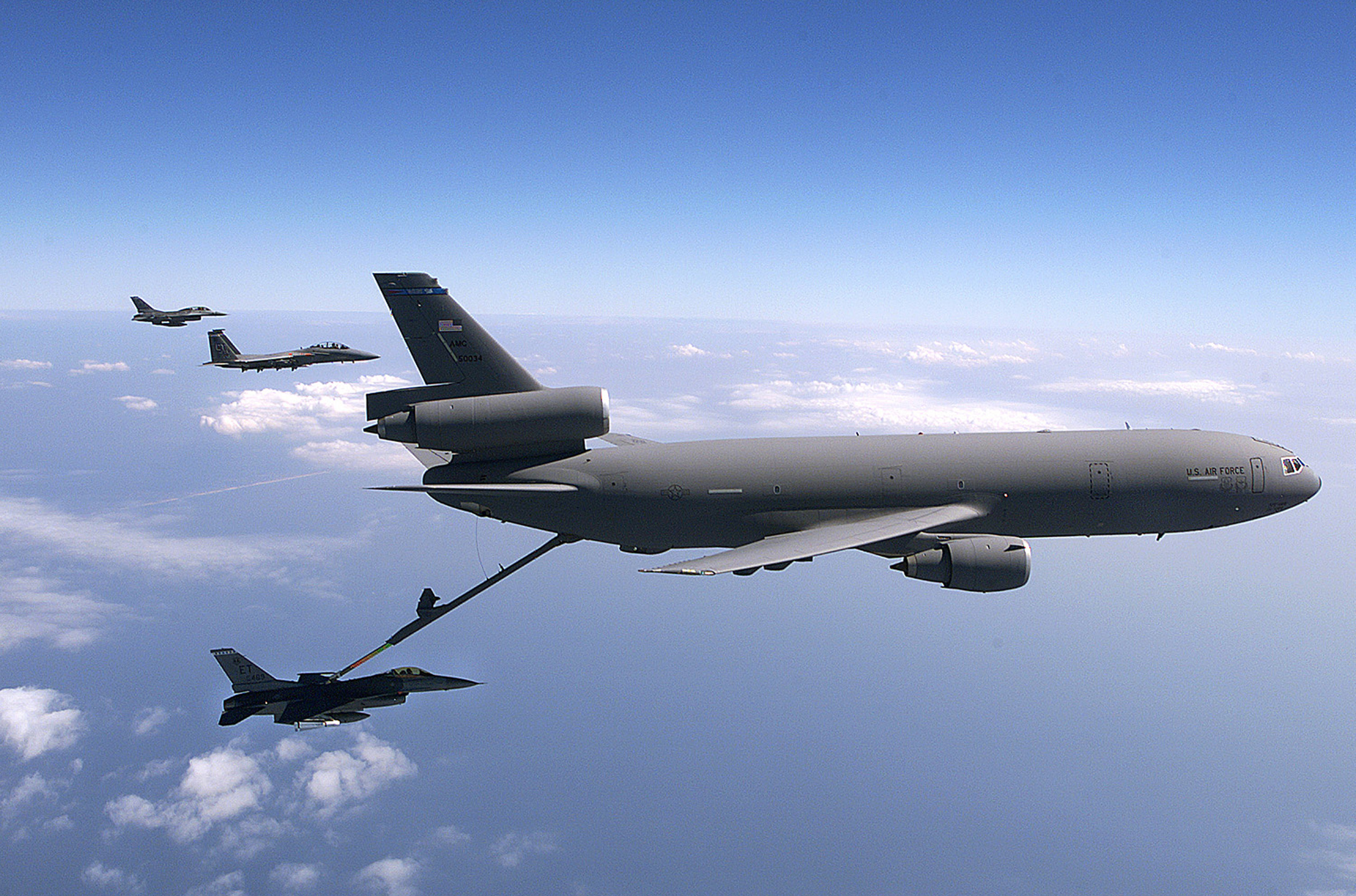
- A United States Air Force KC-10 Extender refueling an F-16 Fighting Falcon

General information
- Type: Tanker/transport
- National origin: United States
- Manufacturer: McDonnell Douglas
- Status: In limited service
- Primary users: Omega Aerial Refueling Services United States Air Force (historical); Royal Netherlands Air Force (historical)
- Number built: KC-10: 60; KDC-10: 2

History
- Manufactured: 1979–1987 (KC-10)
- Introduction date: 1 March 1981; 45 years ago
- First flight: 12 July 1980; 46 years ago
- Retired: 2021 (RNLAF); 2024 (USAF)
- Developed from: McDonnell Douglas DC-10

The McDonnell Douglas KC-10 Extender is an American trijet aerial refueling and cargo aircraft developed from the McDonnell Douglas DC-10 airliner for the United States Air Force's Advanced Tanker Cargo Aircraft Program. (Note: The Handley Page Jetstream had been initially ordered as the C-10, but was soon canceled. This allowed the tanker version of the DC-10 to be designated KC-10A.) It incorporates military-specific equipment for its primary roles of aerial refueling and transport. It was developed to supplement the Boeing KC-135 Stratotanker following experiences in Southeast Asia and the Middle East. It was in service with the USAF from 1981 until its retirement in 2024.

The KC-10 was the second McDonnell Douglas transport aircraft to be selected by the Air Force following the McDonnell Douglas C-9. 60 KC-10s were produced for the USAF. The Royal Netherlands Air Force operated two similar tankers from 1995 to 2021 designated KDC-10 that were converted from used civilian DC-10, instead of purpose built aircraft.

The KC-10 played a key role in the mobilization of US military assets, taking part in overseas operations far from home. These aircraft performed airlift and aerial refueling during the 1986 bombing of Libya (Operation Eldorado Canyon), the 1990–91 Gulf War with Iraq (Operations Desert Shield and Desert Storm), the NATO bombing of Yugoslavia (Operation Allied Force), the war in Afghanistan (Operation Enduring Freedom), and the Iraq War (Operations Iraqi Freedom and New Dawn).

== Design and development ==
=== Advanced Tanker Cargo Aircraft Program ===
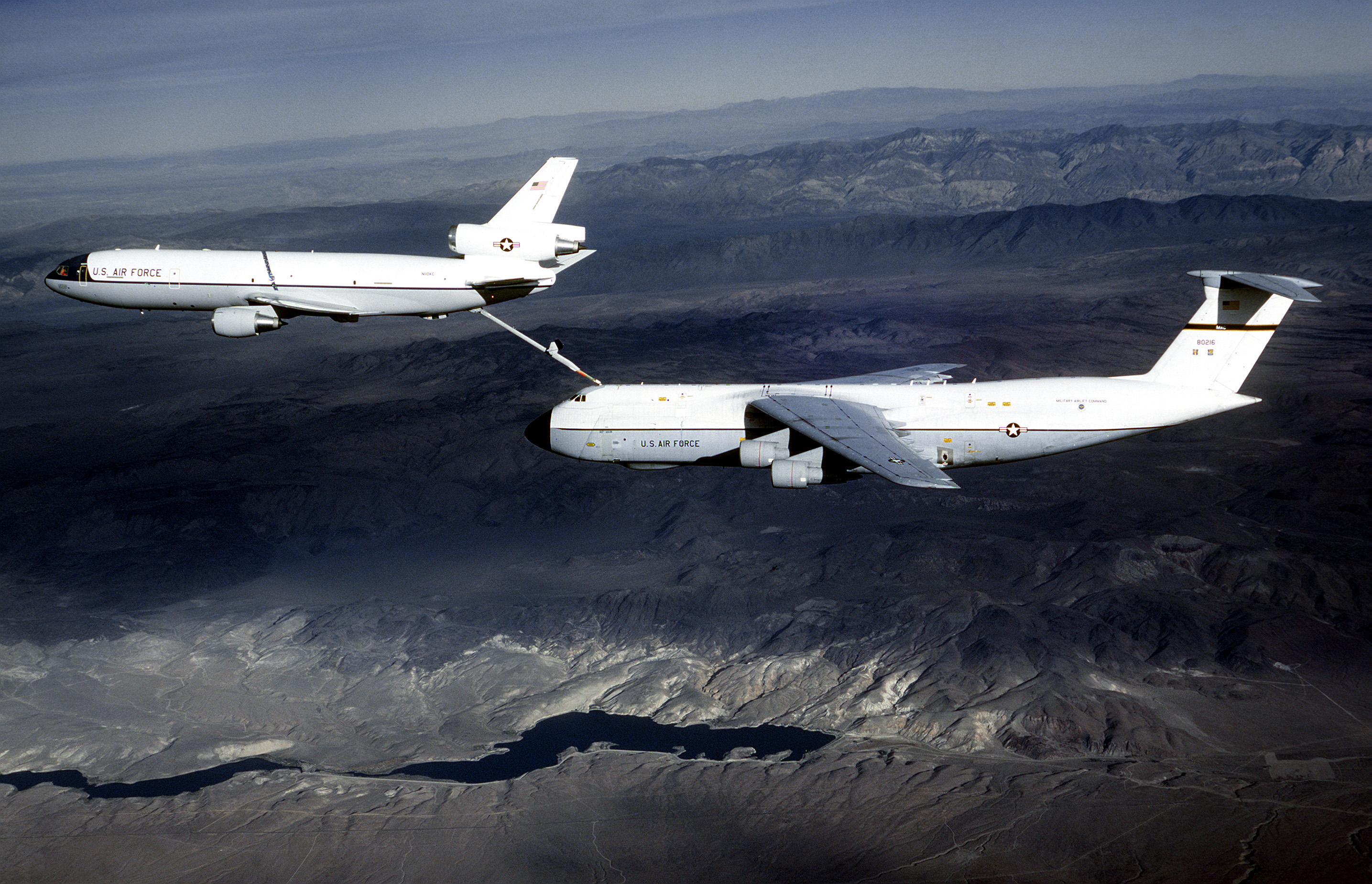
An early KC-10 Extender aircraft refuels a C-5 Galaxy in 1980. Both aircraft are wearing liveries typical of that era.

During the Vietnam War, doubts began to form regarding the Boeing KC-135 Stratotanker fleet's ability to meet the needs of the United States' global commitments. The aerial refueling fleet was deployed to Southeast Asia to support tactical aircraft and strategic bombers, while maintaining the U.S.-based support of the nuclear-bomber fleet. Consequently, the USAF sought an aerial tanker with greater capabilities than the KC-135. In 1972, two DC-10s were flown in trials at Edwards Air Force Base, simulating air refuelings to check for possible wake issues. Boeing performed similar tests with a 747.

During the 1973 Yom Kippur War, the USAF commenced Operation Nickel Grass to supply Israel with weapons and supplies. The operation demonstrated the necessity for adequate air-refueling capabilities; denied landing rights in Europe, C-5 Galaxy transports were forced to carry a fraction of their maximum payload on direct flights from the continental United States to Israel. To address this shortfall in mobility, in 1975, under the Advanced Tanker Cargo Aircraft Program, three aircraft were evaluated—the Boeing 747, Lockheed C-5 and McDonnell Douglas DC-10. In December 1977, the DC-10 was chosen, primarily for its ability to operate from shorter runways. Initially, 12 aircraft were ordered, but this was later increased to 60.

=== KC-10 Extender ===
The KC-10 Extender first flew in July 1980. In October 1980 the first aerial refuel sortie was performed. The KC-10 is largely based on the design of the civilian DC-10-30CF, a convertible cargo/passenger transport variant with an extended range compared to the baseline DC-10-10. For the KC-10, unnecessary features including most windows and lower cargo doors were removed, an improved cargo-handling system was added and the avionics were tailored to the military's needs. The KC-10 retained an 88% commonality with its civilian counterparts, giving it greater access to the worldwide commercial support system.

Early aircraft featured a distinctive light gray and white paint scheme typical of that era. A gray-green camouflage scheme was used on later tankers. The paint scheme was switched to the USAF standard gray color by the late 1990s.

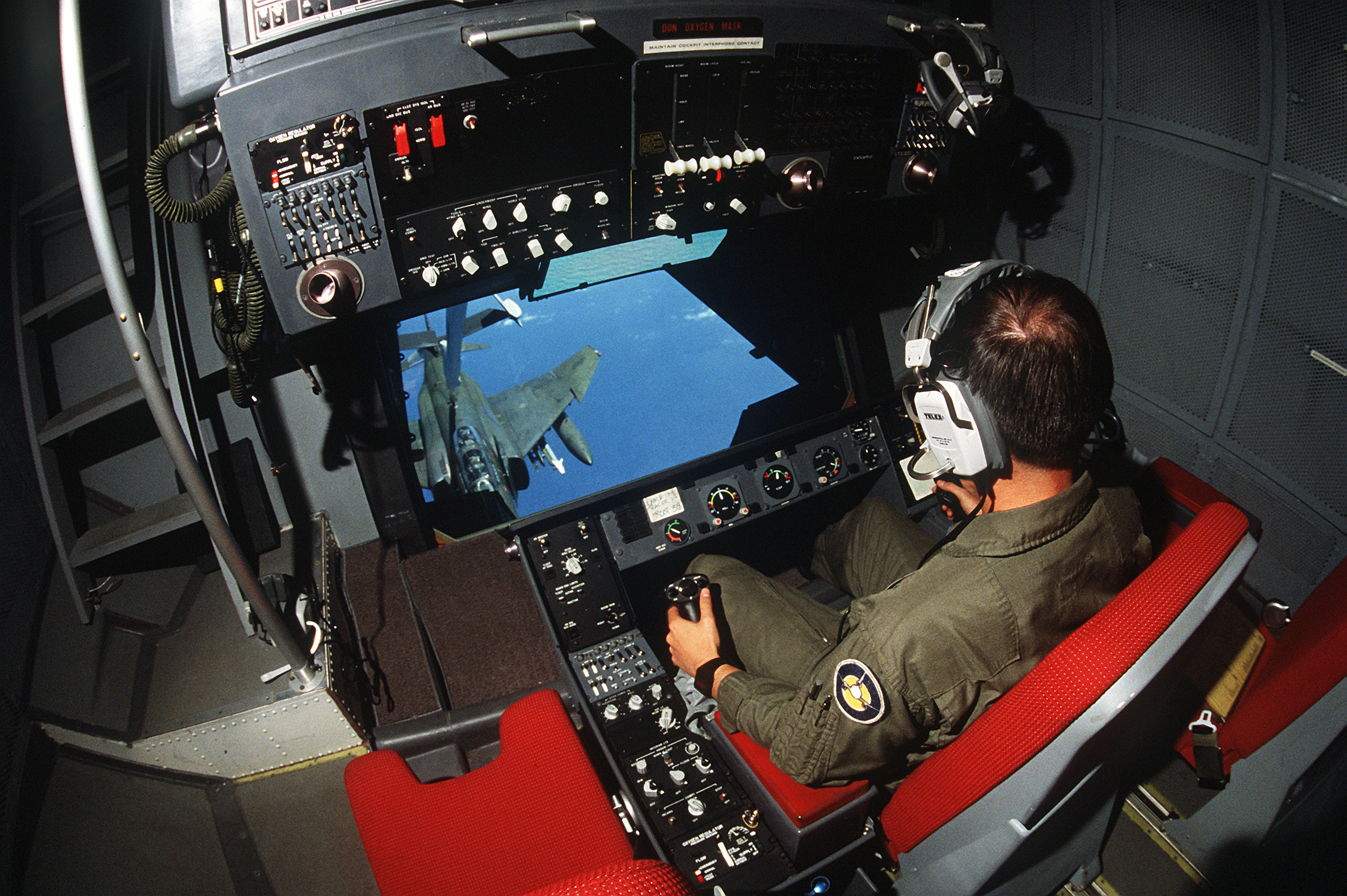
The KC-10's refueling boom operator is seated rather than prone

The most notable changes were the addition of the McDonnell Douglas Advanced Aerial Refueling Boom and additional fuel tanks located in the baggage compartments below the main deck. The extra tanks increase the KC-10's fuel capacity to 356,000 pounds (161,000 kg), nearly double the KC-135's capacity. The KC-10 has both a centerline refueling boom—unique in that it sports a control surface system at its aft end that differs from the V-tail design used on previous tankers—and a drogue-and-hose system on the starboard side of the rear fuselage.

The KC-10 boom operator cockpit is seated in the rear of the aircraft with a wide window for monitoring refueling rather than prone as in the KC-135. The operator controls refueling operations through a digital fly-by wire system. The refueling boom can deliver fuel to a receiver at the maximum rate of 1,100 U.S. gallons (4,200 liters) per minute, while the centerline drogue system has a maximum fuel offload rate of 470 U.S. gallons (1,800 liters) per minute.

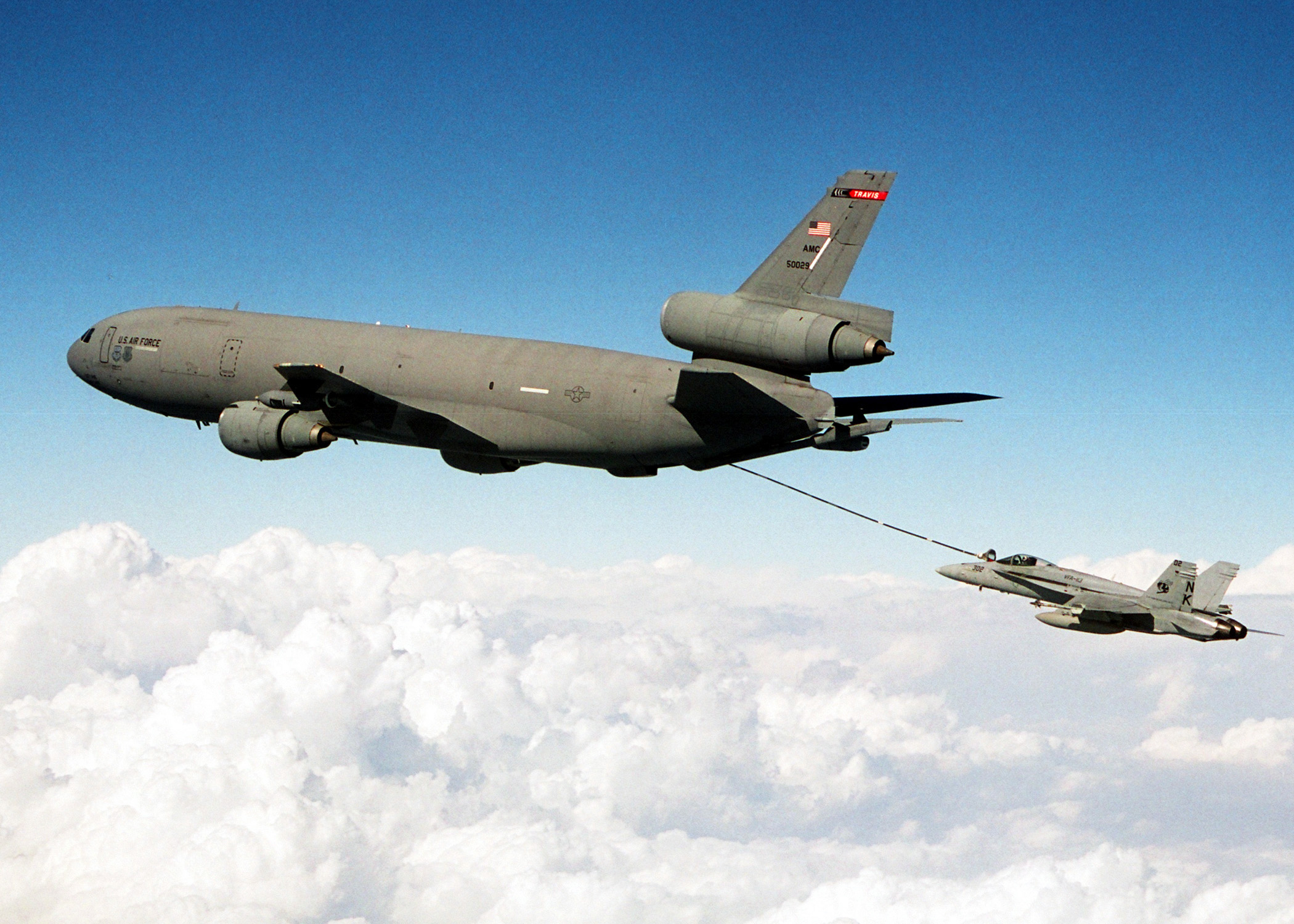
The KC-10's mixed refueling system of hose-and-drogue and flying-boom allows it to refuel the aircraft of the USAF, U.S. Navy, U.S. Marine Corps and allied forces.

Unlike the KC-135, the KC-10's hose-and-drogue system allows refueling of Navy, Marine Corps, and most allied aircraft, all in one mission. The final twenty KC-10s produced included wing-mounted hose-and-drogue pods for added refueling locations. The KC-10 can carry 75 personnel with 146,000 pounds (66,000 kg) of cargo, or 170,000 pounds (77,000 kg) in an all-cargo configuration. It can transport those weights for an unrefueled range of 4,400 miles (7,100 km). The KC-10 has a large door located just behind the flight deck for loading and unloading cargo. Handling equipment is required to raise and lower loads to the cargo opening. The aircraft can still perform aerial refueling while carrying cargo.

=== Further developments ===
In 1984, a need for new transport aircraft for the Royal Netherlands Air Force (Koninklijke Luchtmacht) was identified. The 1991 Gulf War highlighted the deficiencies in mobility of European forces. In 1991, four categories of transport requirements were established. Category A required a large cargo aircraft with a range of at least 4,500 km and the capability to refuel F-16s. In 1992, two DC-10-30CFs were acquired from Martinair in a buy/leaseback contract. When one of the two aircraft was lost in the Martinair Flight 495 crash, a third aircraft was bought from Martinair.

The conversion was handled via the United States foreign military sales program, which contracted McDonnell Douglas. Costs for the conversion were initially estimated at $89.5 million (FY 1994). The aircraft were to be equipped with both a boom and a probe and drogue system. Because McDonnell Douglas did not have any experience with the requested Remote Aerial Refueling Operator (RARO) system, and because the third aircraft differed from the original two, the program could not be completed at budget. By omitting the probe and drogue system and a fixed partition wall between the cargo and passenger, the cost could be limited at $96 million.

To make up for the cost increase, McDonnell Douglas hired Dutch companies to do part of the work. The conversion of the aircraft was performed by KLM from October 1994 to September 1995 for the first aircraft and from February to December 1995 for the second. This was much longer than planned, mostly because McDonnell Douglas delivered the parts late. This would have again increased the cost, but in the contract for the AH-64 Apaches which the Royal Netherlands Air Force also bought from McDonnell Douglas, the price was agreed to be kept at $96 million.

In 2010, the USAF awarded a contract to Boeing to upgrade the fleet of 59 aircraft with new Communication, navigation and surveillance and air traffic management (CNS/ATM) system. This was to allow the type to fly in civil airspace as new ICAO and FAA standards took effect in 2015. Rockwell Collins was awarded a contract in 2011 for avionics and systems integration for the cockpit modernization program.

== Operational history ==
=== United States ===
In March 1981, the first KC-10 was delivered to the USAF's Strategic Air Command (SAC) at Barksdale AFB. In 1982 a newly renamed 22d Air Refueling Wing at March AFB, CA, formerly the 22d Bombardment Wing, was re-equipped with KC-10A Extenders and became the second USAF unit to operate the new tankers. The 60th and final KC-10 was delivered on 29 November 1988. The KC-10s served with SAC until 1992, when they were reassigned to the newly established Air Mobility Command.

In the aerial refueling role, the KC-10s operated largely in the strategic refueling of large number of tactical aircraft on ferry flights and the refueling of other strategic transport aircraft. Conversely, the KC-135 fleet has operated largely in the in-theater tactical role. In 2010, there were 59 KC-10 Extenders in service with the USAF. The USAF's KC-10s were stationed primarily at Travis AFB, California, and McGuire AFB, now part of Joint Base McGuire-Dix-Lakehurst, in New Jersey.

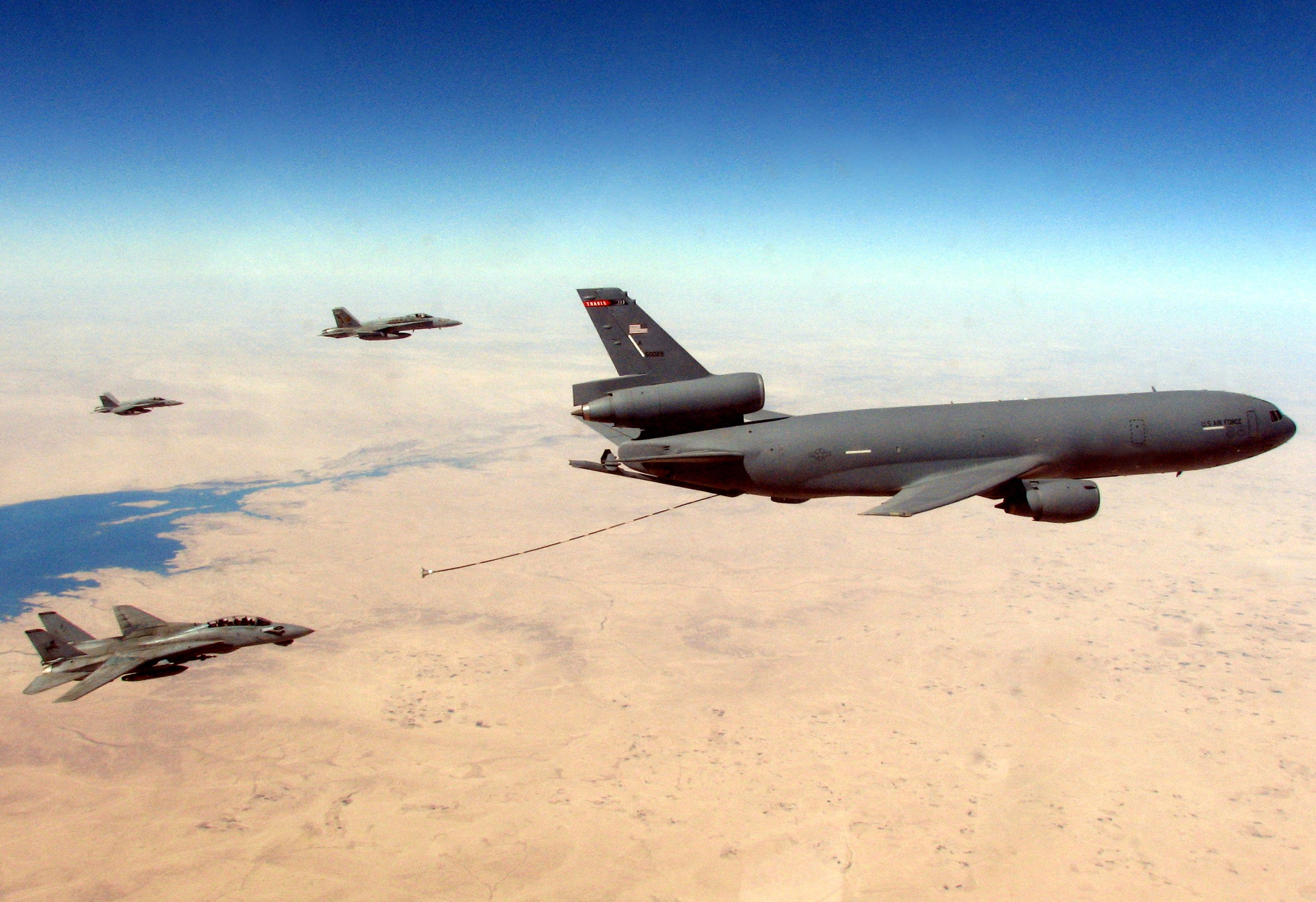
A US Navy F-14D and two F/A-18Cs prepare to refuel from a KC-10 in 2005 over the Persian Gulf.

In 1986, when faced with refusals of basing and overflight rights from continental European countries during Operation El Dorado Canyon, the U.S. was forced to use the UK-based F-111s in the air-strikes against Libya. The KC-10s and KC-135s allowed 29 F-111s, along with other USAF and Navy aircraft, to reach their targets.

In 1991, the KC-10 played a key role during Operations Desert Shield and Desert Storm. KC-10s facilitated the deployment of tactical, strategic, and transport aircraft to Saudi Arabia. In the early stages of Operation Desert Shield, aerial refueling was key to the rapid airlift of materiel and forces. In addition to refueling airlift aircraft, the KC-10, along with the smaller KC-135, moved thousands of tons of cargo and thousands of troops in support of the massive buildup. The KC-10 and the KC-135 conducted about 51,700 separate refueling operations and delivered 125 million gallons (475 million liters) of fuel without missing a single scheduled rendezvous.

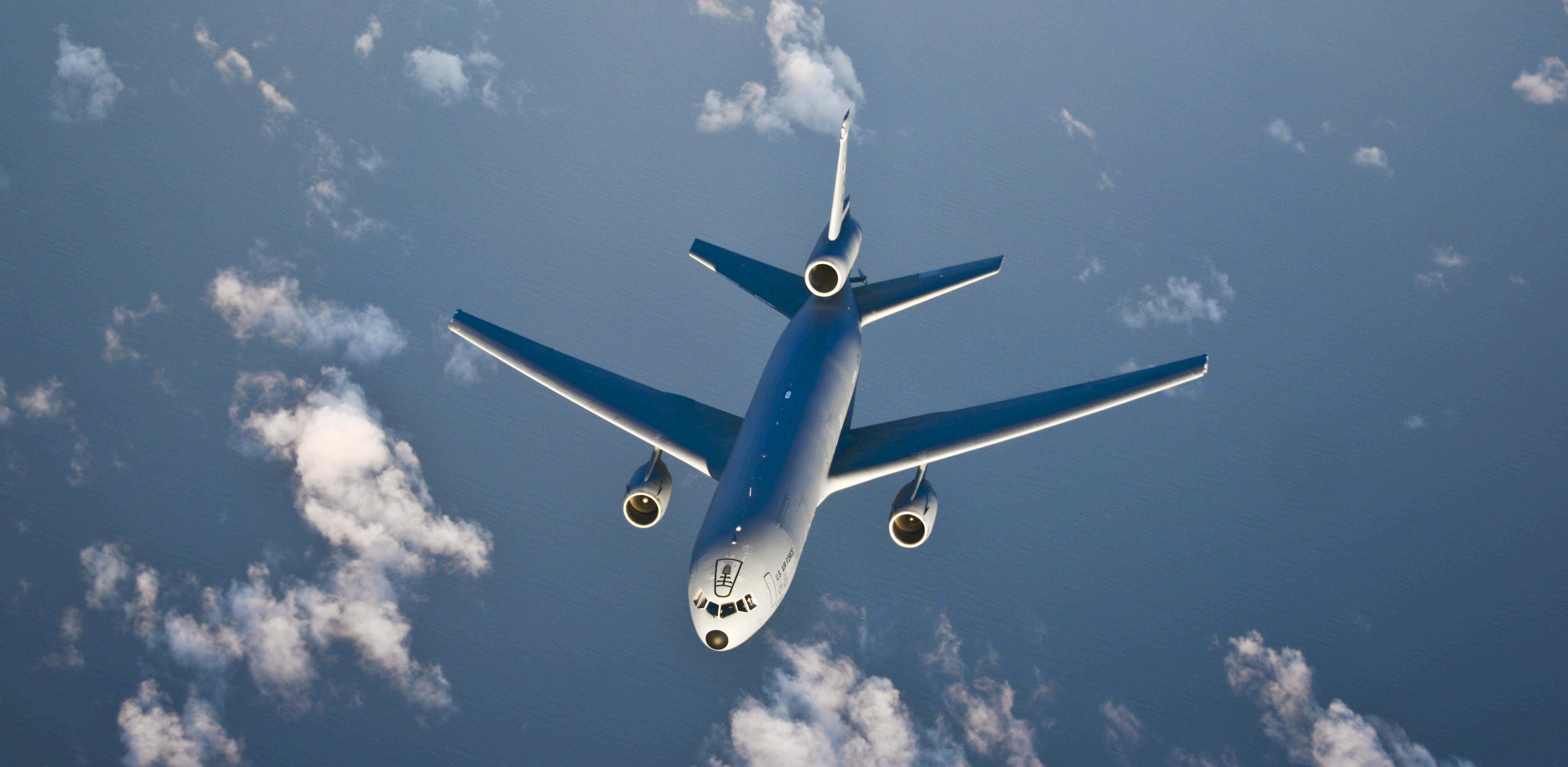
A KC-10 Extender of Travis AFB approaching a second KC-10 for refuelling over the Pacific Ocean, 2017

In March 1999, NATO launched Operation Allied Force against the government of Yugoslavia. The mobility portion of the operation began in February and was heavily dependent on tankers. By early May 1999, some 150 KC-10s and KC-135s deployed to Europe where they refueled bombers, fighters and support aircraft engaged in the conflict. The KC-10 flew 409 missions throughout the entire Allied Force campaign and continued support operations in Kosovo. Since 11 September 2001, KC-10s flew more than 350 missions guarding U.S. skies as a part of Operation Noble Eagle. During Operations Enduring Freedom and Iraqi Freedom, KC-10s flew more than 1,390 missions delivering critical air refueling support to numerous joint and Coalition receiver aircraft. As of 2004, KC-10s were expected to serve until 2043.

The USAF considered retiring its fleet of KC-10 tankers in response to sequestration budget cuts as part of the service's FY 2015 budget. A "vertical chop" to divest all KC-10s was suggested because there are fewer KC-10s than KC-135s, having three different tanker models in service after the introduction of the KC-46 would be costly, and a "horizontal cut" across the refueling fleets would achieve small efficiencies. Some believed retiring the KC-10 would not benefit the USAF, given that it is equipped with both boom and hose-and-drogue refueling systems and the fleet's relatively young age.

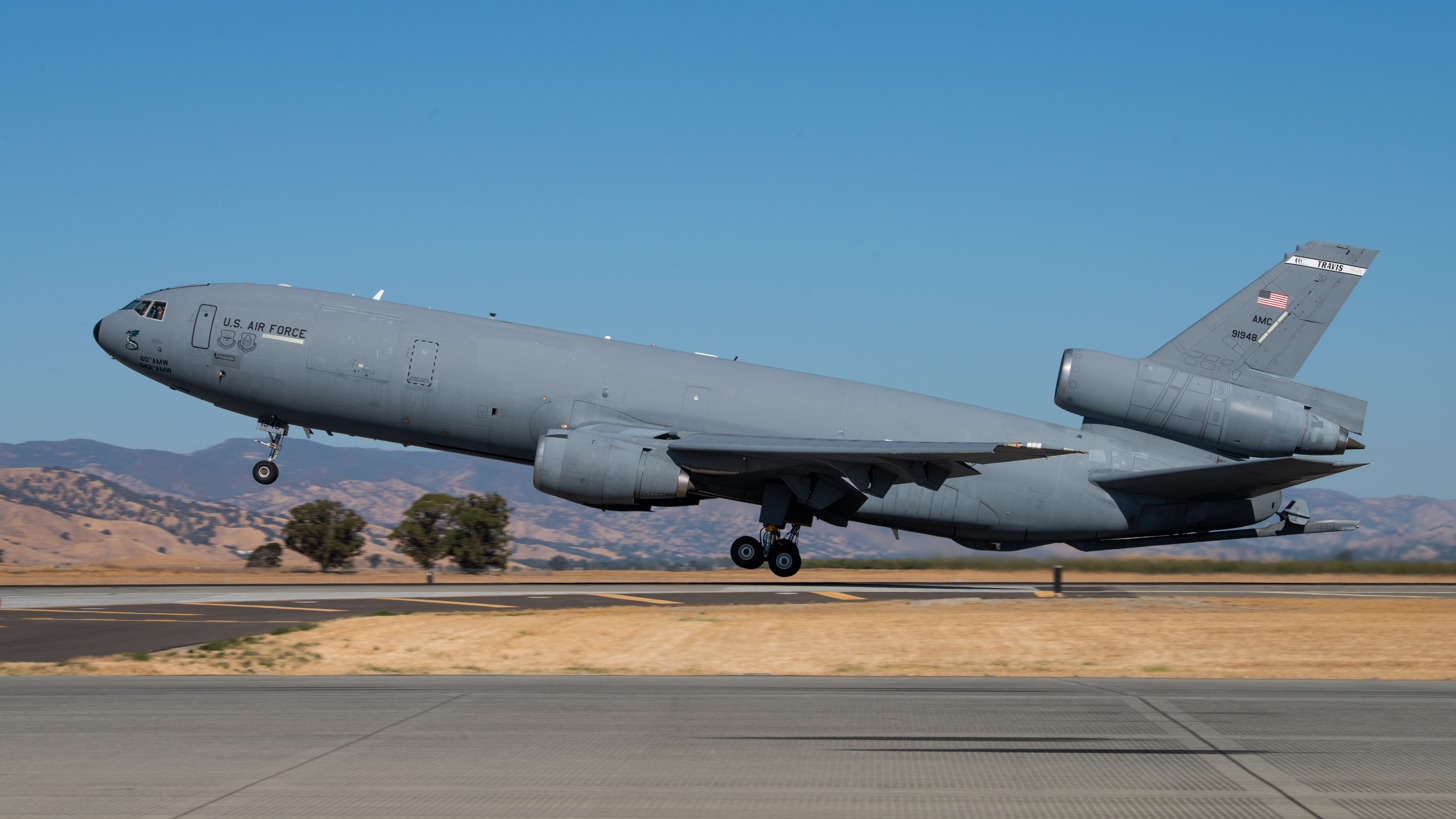
The last USAF KC-10 takes off from Travis Air Force Base, California, September 2024.

At first, officials claimed that the initial focus on retiring the KC-10 in September 2013 was a "trial balloon" to call attention to USAF operating cost issues. In early 2013, the KC-10 had a per hour flying cost of $21,170 and a mission capable rate of 87 percent. In July 2020, the first US KC-10 to be retired, tail number 86-0036, was transferred to the 309th Aerospace Maintenance and Regeneration Group (AMARG) for storage at Davis-Monthan Air Force Base, Arizona.

In July 2021, the 2d ARS was the first KC-10 squadron to start conversion to the KC-46. In August 2021, the KC-10 took part in the largest non-combatant evacuation in support of Operation Allies refuge and contributing to the safe evacuation of more than 124,000 Afghan refugees.

In January 2023, the USAF announced that all KC-10s were to be retired by 30 September 2024. The KC-10 flew its last combat sortie for the USAF on 5 October 2023. On 26 September 2024, the KC-10 flew its final sortie on tail number 79-1948 bound for the 309th Aerospace Maintenance and Regeneration Group (AMARG) at Davis-Monthan Air Force Base, Arizona.

=== Netherlands ===
The two Dutch KDC-10s were used for both refueling and transport. They were stationed on Eindhoven Airport as part of the 334th Transport Squadron. Of the 5,500 hours flown in the first three years of use, the aircraft were used in their tanker role for 50% of the time. Besides being used by the air force and NATO allies, the KDC-10s were used to support peacekeeping and humanitarian aid operations. Of the first three years, 32% of the flight hours were used for peacekeeping and humanitarian aid.

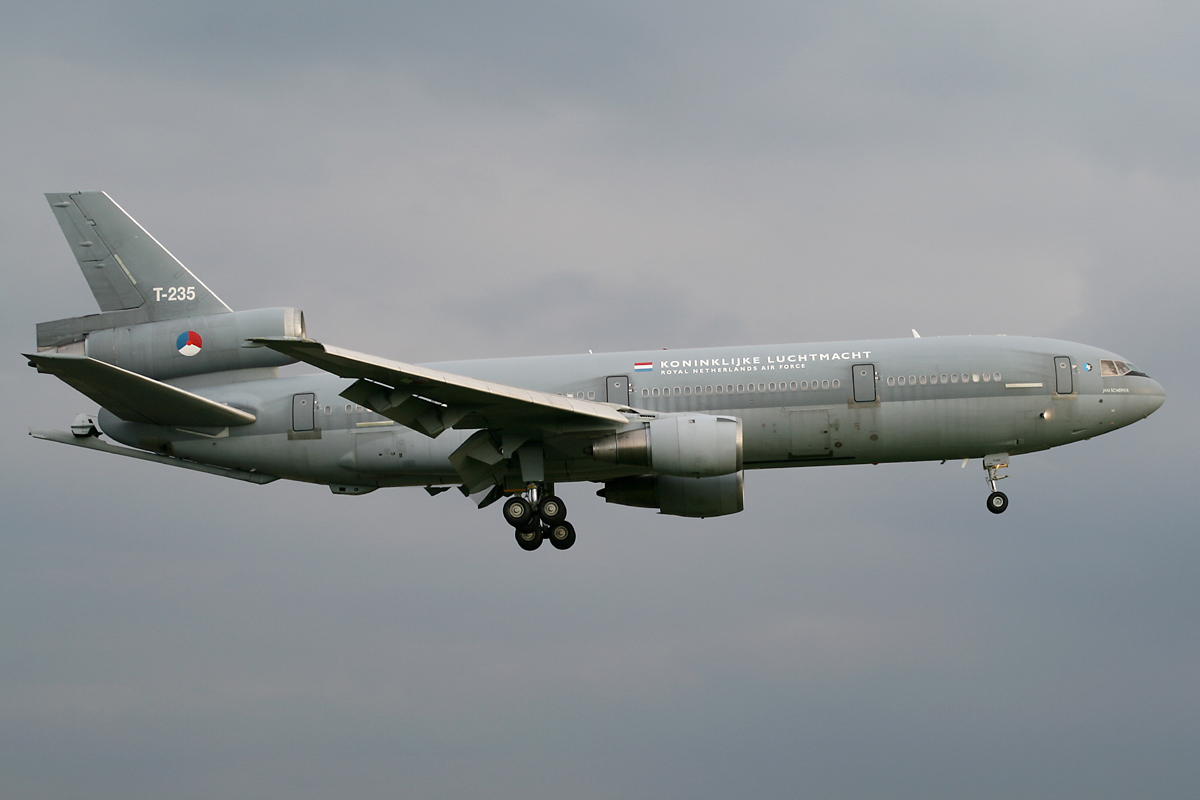
The second Royal Netherlands Air Force KDC-10 with landing gear down

In this function, the aircraft was deployed to Kosovo to evacuate refugees, to the Caribbean and Central America to provide humanitarian aid after the hurricanes Luis, Georges and Mitch and to countries in Africa and Asia to provide development aid. In 1998, the aircraft evacuated Dutch citizens from Indonesia during the Fall of Suharto. Dutch KDC-10s operated out of Manas AFB in support of allied forces during Operation Enduring Freedom and in support of Allied Air Force over Iraq and Syria.

A third cargo-only DC-10, registered T-255 was acquired and served for three years before being withdrawn from service in April 2014 due to Dutch defense cuts and flown to Newquay Airport for scrapping. The KDC-10s in Dutch service were replaced with the Airbus A330 MRTT. The first aircraft, registered T-264/'Prins Bernhard' and due for a major service, was withdrawn from use in November 2019, prior to being transferred to its new owner, Omega Aerial Refueling Services, an American defense contractor. The last KDC-10, registered T-235/'Jan Scheffer' remained in Dutch service until October 2021. The aircraft left The Netherlands bound for service with Omega in October 2021.

=== Civilian operators ===
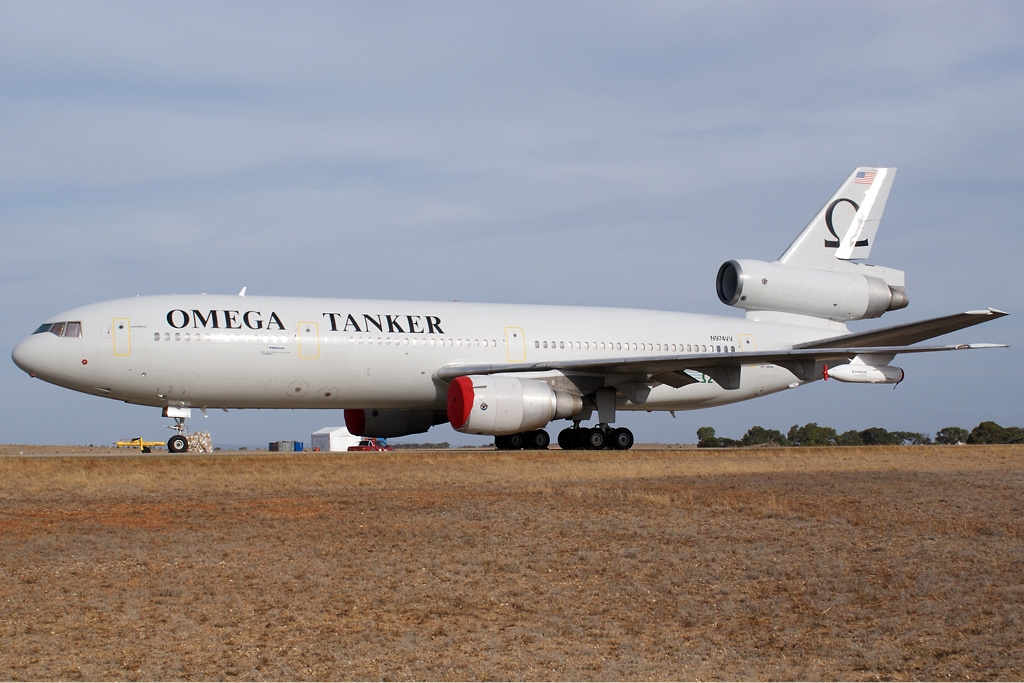
Omega's KDC-10 tanker, March 2009

Commercial refueling companies Omega Aerial Refueling Services and Global Airtanker Service operate three KDC-10 tankers, N974VV, N235UL and N264DE, for lease. They were converted from DC-10s and provide probe and drogue (N974VV) or boom (N235UL, N264DE) refueling capabilities from wing pods similar to the KC-10.

In June and July 2011, Omega Air's KDC-10 supported three Royal Australian Air Force's F/A-18 Hornets, en route to Red Flag – Alaska.

In 2019, Omega agreed to purchase the Netherlands' two KDC-10s. One was received in November 2019, and the second delivered in October 2021.

== Variants ==
- KC-10A

Initial military tanker version based on the DC-10-30CF.

- KDC-10

Conversion of DC-10-30CF aircraft to tanker/transport configuration. While a FMS program run through McDonnell Douglas, conversion of two aircraft was carried out by KLM. Omega Aerial Refueling Services now operates both former RNLAF KDC-10-30 aircraft and 1 KDC-10-40. Two aircraft converted.

- KC-10B

After McDonnell Douglas did the KDC-10 conversion for the Royal Netherlands Air Force in 1992, they proposed a tanker/transport version of the MD-11CF which had the in-house designation KMD-11. MDC offered either conversion of second hand aircraft (KMD-11) or new build aircraft (KC-10B), the proposed KMD-11 offered 35,000 lb more cargo capacity and 8,400 lb more transferable fuel than the KC-10A. It was offered to the RNLAF and Royal Saudi Air Force (RSAF) in the 1990s and the Royal Australian Air Force (RAAF) in the early 2000s.

== Operators ==
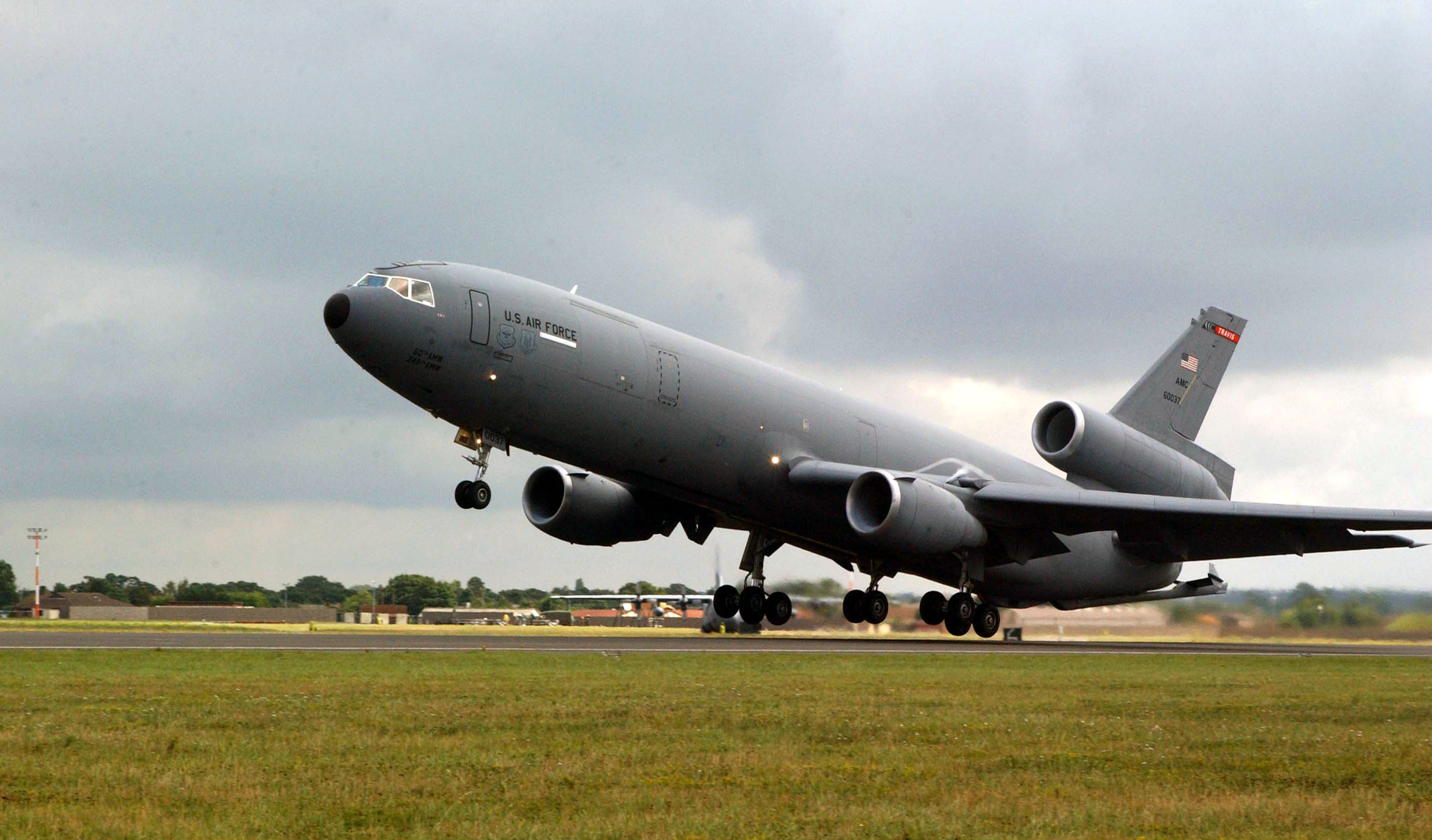
A KC-10 from Travis AFB taking off from RAF Mildenhall

- Omega Aerial Refueling Services

=== Former ===
United States

- United States Air Force – Final KC-10 retired on 26 September 2024.
- Strategic Air Command
  - 2nd Bomb Wing – Barksdale AFB, Louisiana 1981–1992
    - 2d Air Refueling Squadron 1989–1992
    - 32d Air Refueling Squadron 1981–1992
  - 4th Wing – Seymour-Johnson AFB, North Carolina 1991–1992
    - 344th Air Refueling Squadron
    - 911th Air Refueling Squadron
  - 22d Air Refueling Wing – March AFB, California 1982–1992
    - 6th Air Refueling Squadron 1989–1992
    - 9th Air Refueling Squadron 1982–1992
  - 68th Air Refueling Group/Wing – Seymour-Johnson AFB 1982–1991
    - 344th Air Refueling Squadron 1986–1991
    - 911th Air Refueling Squadron 1982–1991
  - 802d Air Refueling Wing – Lajes Air Base, Azores 1990–1991
    - 802d Air Refueling Squadron
  - 1709th Air Refueling Wing – King Abdul Aziz Air Base, Saudi Arabia 1990–1991
    - 1710th Air Refueling Squadron
- Air Mobility Command
  - 22d Air Refueling Wing – March AFB 1992–1994
    - 6th Air Refueling Squadron
    - 9th Air Refueling Squadron
  - 458th Operations Group – Barksdale AFB 1992–1994
    - 2d Air Refueling Squadron
    - 32d Air Refueling Squadron
  - 4th Operations Group – Seymour-Johnson AFB 1992–1995
    - 344th Air Refueling Squadron 1992–1994
    - 711th Air Refueling Squadron 1994–1994
    - 744th Air Refueling Squadron 1994–1995
    - 911th Air Refueling Squadron 1992–1994
  - 60th Air Mobility Wing – Travis AFB, California 1994–2024
    - 6th Air Refueling Squadron 1995–2024
    - 9th Air Refueling Squadron 1994–2024
  - 305th Air Mobility Wing – McGuire AFB, New Jersey 1994–2023
    - 2d Air Refueling Squadron 1994–2021
    - 32d Air Refueling Squadron 1994–2023
  - 380th Air Expeditionary Wing – Al Dhafra Air Base, United Arab Emirates 2002–2023
    - 908th Expeditionary Air Refueling Squadron
  - 722d Air Refueling Wing – March AFB 1994–1996
    - 6th Air Refueling Squadron 1994–1996
    - 9th Air Refueling Squadron 1994
- Air Force Reserve Command
  - 98th Air Refueling Group (Associate) – Barksdale AFB 1987–1994
    - 78th Air Refueling Squadron
  - 452d Air Refueling Wing (Associate) – March AFB 1981–1995
    - 78th Air Refueling Squadron 1981–1987
    - 79th Air Refueling Squadron 1982–1995
  - 349th Air Mobility Wing (Associate) – Travis AFB 1994–2024
    - 70th Air Refueling Squadron 1994–2024
    - 79th Air Refueling Squadron 1995–2024
  - 514th Air Mobility Wing (Associate) – McGuire AFB 1994–2023
    - 76th Air Refueling Squadron 1994–2022
    - 78th Air Refueling Squadron 1994–2023
  - 916th Air Refueling Group (Associate) – Seymour-Johnson 1985–1994
    - 77th Air Refueling Squadron

Netherlands

- Royal Netherlands Air Force operated two KDC-10s, which upon retirement were sold to Omega Aerial Refueling Services. The Dutch tankers were replaced by Airbus A330 MRTTs owned by NATO as part of the Multinational Multi-Role Tanker Transport Fleet (MMF). A DC-10 transport, registered T-255 served for three years before being withdrawn from service in April 2014 due to Dutch defence cuts.
  - 334 Squadron – Eindhoven Airport

== Incidents ==
On 17 September 1987, KC-10A serial number 82-0190 was undergoing maintenance on the ground at Barksdale AFB, Louisiana, and suffered an explosion and subsequent fire. The KC-10 was significantly damaged and written off. One member of the ground crew died in the fire.

== Aircraft on display ==
- 79-0433 – on static display at the Air Mobility Command Museum at Dover Air Force Base, Delaware. It was the first KC-10 to be produced, and was used for testing and development before entering service in 1981.
- 84-0185 – on static display at the March Field Air Museum at March Air Reserve Base, Riverside, California.
- 84-0191 – on static display at the Air Park of the National Museum of the United States Air Force in Dayton, Ohio.

== Specifications (KC-10A) ==
Data from USAF Fact sheet, McDonnell Douglas DC-10 and KC-10 Extender

General characteristics

- Crew: 4 (Aircraft Commander, copilot, flight engineer, and boom operator)
- Capacity: 170,000 lb of cargo, 25 pallets and 16 passengers, or 17 pallets and 75 passengers
- Length: 181 ft 7 in (55.35 m)
- Wingspan: 165 ft 4.5 in (50.406 m)
- Height: 58 ft 1 in (17.70 m)
- Wing area: 3,958 sq ft (367.7 m^{2})
- Airfoil: root: DSMA-496/-521/-522; tip: DSMA-519/-520
- Empty weight: 241,027 lb (109,328 kg)
- Gross weight: 590,000 lb (267,619 kg)
- Max takeoff weight: 590,000 lb (267,619 kg)
- Fuel capacity: 365,000 lb (165,561 kg)
- Powerplant: 3 × General Electric F103 (GE CF6-50C2) turbofan engines, 52,500 lbf (234 kN) thrust each

Performance

- Maximum speed: 538 mph (866 km/h, 468 kn)
- Maximum speed: Mach 0.89
- Range: 4,400 mi (7,100 km, 3,800 nmi) with a maximum passenger capacity; 3,800 nmi (7,038 km; 4,373 mi) with maximum cargo capacity.
- Ferry range: 11,500 mi (18,500 km, 10,000 nmi)
- Service ceiling: 42,000 ft (13,000 m)
- Rate of climb: 6,870 ft/min (34.9 m/s)

== See also ==
Related development

- McDonnell Douglas DC-10

Aircraft of comparable role, configuration, and era

- Lockheed TriStar (RAF)
- Ilyushin Il-78

Related lists

- List of tanker aircraft
- List of active United States military aircraft
- List of United States military aerial refueling aircraft
