= 915th Tactical Fighter Group =

915th Tactical Fighter Group

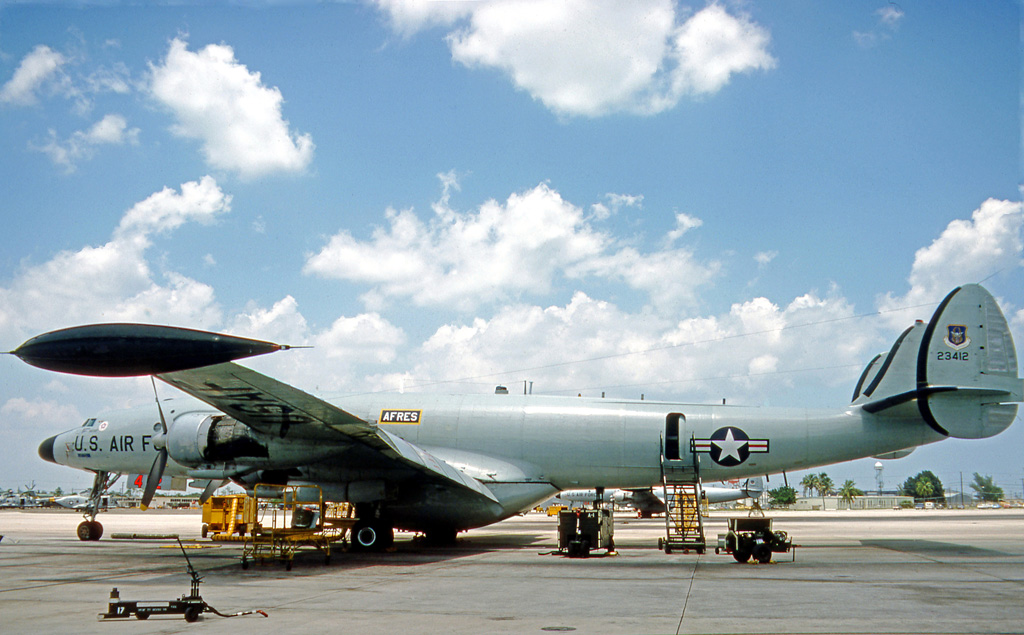
- Group Lockheed EC-121 Warning Star at Homestead AFB (Note: Aircraft is Lockheed EC-121T Warning Star serial 52-3412 of the 79th Airborne Early Warning & Control Squadron in 1976.)
- Active: 1963-1971; 1976-1981
- Country: United States
- Branch: United States Air Force
- Role: Tactical Fighter

Insignia
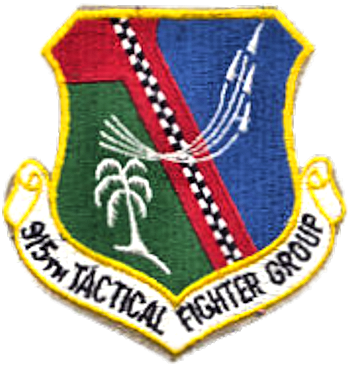
- Patch with 915th Tactical Fighter Group emblem

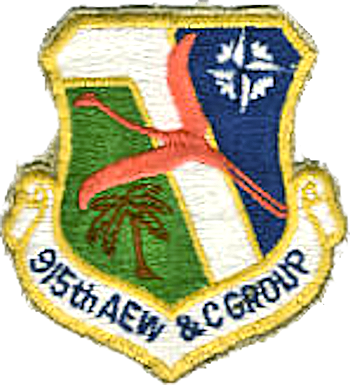
- Patch with 915th Airborne Early Warning and Control Group emblem

The 915th Tactical Fighter Group is an inactive United States Air Force Reserve unit. It was last active with the Tenth Air Force, based at Homestead Air Force Base, Florida. It was inactivated on 1 April 1981.

== History ==
=== Need for reserve troop carrier groups ===
During the first half of 1955, the Air Force began detaching Air Force Reserve squadrons from their parent wing locations to separate sites. The concept offered several advantages. Communities were more likely to accept the smaller squadrons than the large wings and the location of separate squadrons in smaller population centers would facilitate recruiting and manning. Continental Air Command (ConAC)'s plan called for placing Air Force Reserve units at fifty-nine installations located throughout the United States. When these relocations were completed in 1959, reserve wing headquarters and wing support elements would typically be on one base, along with one (or in some cases two) of the wing's flying squadrons, while the remaining flying squadrons were spread over thirty-five Air Force, Navy and civilian airfields under what was called the Detached Squadron Concept.

Although this dispersal was not a problem when the entire wing was called to active service, mobilizing a single flying squadron and elements to support it proved difficult. This weakness was demonstrated in the partial mobilization of reserve units during the Berlin Crisis of 1961 To resolve this, at the start of 1962, ConAC determined to reorganize its reserve wings by establishing groups with support elements for each of its troop carrier squadrons. This reorganization would facilitate mobilization of elements of wings in various combinations when needed. However, as this plan was entering its implementation phase, another partial mobilization occurred for the Cuban Missile Crisis, with the units being released on 22 November 1962. The formation of troop carrier groups occurred in January 1963 for units that had not been mobilized, but was delayed until February for those that had been.

=== Activation of 915th Troop Carrier Group ===
As a result, the 915th Troop Carrier Group was established at Homestead Air Force Base, Florida on 11 February 1963 as the headquarters for the 76th Troop Carrier Squadron, which had been stationed there since July 1960. Along with group headquarters, a Combat Support Squadron, Materiel Squadron and a Tactical Infirmary were organized to support the 76th.

The group's mission was to organize, recruit and train Air Force Reserve personnel in the tactical airlift of airborne forces, their equipment and supplies and delivery of these forces and materials by airdrop, landing or cargo extraction systems. The group was equipped with Fairchild C-119 Flying Boxcars for Tactical Air Command airlift operations.

The 915th was one of three C-119 groups assigned to the 435th Wing in 1963, the others being the 916th Troop Carrier Group at Donaldson Air Force Base, South Carolina and the 917th Troop Carrier Group at Barksdale Air Force Base, Louisiana.

Transferred from TAC to Military Air Transport Service, being upgraded to a Douglas C-124 Globemaster II long range intercontinental transport group in 1965. Operated aircraft on flights to Europe, Bermuda, and Puerto Rico. Supported Vietnam War, by the end of 1966, the unit had flown several missions into Tan Son Nhut Air Base in South Vietnam. Ordered to active service to support airlift to Japan and South Korea in 1968 in support of the Pueblo Crisis. Relieved and returned to the reserve in June 1969. Inactivated in 1971 as part of phaseout of C-124 Globemaster.

=== 915th Airborne Early Warning and Control Group ===
Activated by Aerospace Defense Command in 1976 as a reserve Lockheed EC-121T Warning Star Airborne Early Warning and Control unit, operating flights from Homestead to Naval Air Station Keflavik, Iceland. Mission of group was early warning of unknown aircraft approaching the east coast of the United States and monitoring of Soviet Air Force flights along the Atlantic Coast to and from Cuba.

In 1978 ADCOM began phaseout of the EC-121 as the Boeing E-3A Sentry AWACS aircraft entered the aircraft inventory. The Air Force Reserve began conversion of the 915th to a tactical fighter group and inactivated its 79th Airborne Early Warning and Control Squadron, replacing it with the 93d Tactical Fighter Squadron. The group was redesigned as the 915th Tactical Fighter Group. the 915th Group was the first Air Force Reserve McDonnell F-4C Phantom II unit in October 1978.

Inactivated in 1981 when Tenth Air Force elevated its presence at Homestead to a wing, with personnel and equipment transferred to the new 482d Tactical Fighter Wing.

== Lineage ==
915th Military Airlift Group

- Established as the 915th Troop Carrier Group, Medium and activated on 28 December 1962 (not organized)

Organized in the Reserve on 17 January 1963
Redesignated 915th Air Transport Group on 1 December 1965
Redesignated 915th Military Airlift Group on 1 April 1966
Ordered to Active Service on 26 January 1968
Relieved from Active Duty on 1 June 1969
Inactivated on 30 July 1971

915th Tactical Fighter Group

- Established as the 915th Airborne Early Warning and Control Group on 30 November 1976

Activated in the Reserve on 1 December 1976
Redesignated 915th Tactical Fighter Group on 1 October 1978
Inactivated on 1 April 1981

=== Assignments ===
- Continental Air Command, 28 Dec 1962
- 435th Troop Carrier Wing, 17 January 1963
- 445th Air Transport Wing (later 445th Military Airlift) Wing, 1 December 1965
- 459th Military Airlift Wing, 26 January 1968
- 445th Military Airlift Wing, 1 September 1969 – 21 April 1971
- Tenth Air Force, 1 December 1976 – 1 April 1981

=== Components ===
- 76th Troop Carrier Squadron (later 76th Air Transport Squadron, 76th Military Airlift Squadron), 17 January 1963 – 1 April 1966
- 79th Military Airlift Squadron, 1 April 1966 – 30 June 1971
- 79th Airborne Early Warning and Control Squadron, 30 June 1971 – 1 October 1978
- 93d Tactical Fighter Squadron, 1 October 1978 – 1 April 1981

=== Stations ===
- Homestead Air Force Base, Florida, 17 January 1963 – 21 April 1971
- Homestead Air Force Base, Florida, 1 December 1976 – 1 April 1981

=== Aircraft ===
- Fairchild C-119 Flying Boxcar, 1963-1966
- Douglas C-124 Globemaster II, 1966-1971
- Lockheed EC-121 Warning Star, 1976-1978
- McDonnell F-4C Phantom II, 1978-1981
