= Howard Bellin =

American plastic surgeon

Howard T. Bellin is an American plastic surgeon, the director of CosMedica, a plastic surgery center in New York.

== Education ==
Bellin obtained his bachelor's degree from Amherst College in 1957, and his M.D. from New York Medical College in 1962, followed by an internship at the University of California Hospital.

== Family ==
Howard Bellin was born to Maurice Bellin and Etta Bellin. His family lived in Passaic Clifton and then South Orange, New Jersey. In 1964 he married Christina Paolozzi, a model, daughter of Alicia Spaulding and Count Lorenzo Paolozzi. The couple were known for their extravagant parties attended by a variety of glamorous personalities. The Bellins divorced in 1982. He has three children, Cheryl Blanchard, Marco Bellin and the director and screenwriter Andy Bellin.

== Career ==
Bellin began his general surgery residency at the Metropolitan Hospital in New York for three years. In 1966 he joined the United States Air Force Medical Corp, stationed at Homestead Air Force Base, Florida. He returned to New York in 1968 to complete his plastic surgery residency at Columbia Presbyterian Medical Center. In the following years he was an instructor at Columbia College of Physicians and Surgeons and New York Medical College. He then started his own practice, Cosmedica in New York.

== Publications ==
Bellin co-authored. "Bellin's Beautiful You Book" published in 1980 by Prentice-Hall that describes various plastic surgery procedures. According to WorldCat, the book is held in 57 libraries His second book, "BeautyScience" was published by Metropublish Ltd in 2000 and provides advice on cosmetic surgery. It has no copies listed in WorldCat.

== Inventions ==
Bellin holds 8 American patents in his name, as well as a few in Germany. His first patent was a Portable EKG monitoring device, accredited to himself, Donald Fellner and Nichan Tchorbajian.

=== List of inventions ===
- US 4546776 "Portable EKG monitoring device"
- US 5448996 ”Patient Monitor Sheets”
- US 5003983 “Cardiac Monitoring System”
- US 5107849 “System and method for Cancellation”
- US 20040127985 ”Non-rotating breast implant“
- US 5440177 ”Integrated auto-theft prevention system”
- US 7544375 ”Composition”

== Media ==
Bellin has been featured on Oprah, Geraldo, Extra, CNN, MTV and 20/20. He has provided expert commentary for a variety of publications including the New York Times, in which he offers his medical expertise and experience in the cosmetic surgery practice.

He also appeared on the reality television series The Real Housewives of New York City, where he provided liposuction for Sonja Morgan.
