= 79th Air Refueling Squadron =

US Air Force reserve unit

79th Air Refueling Squadron

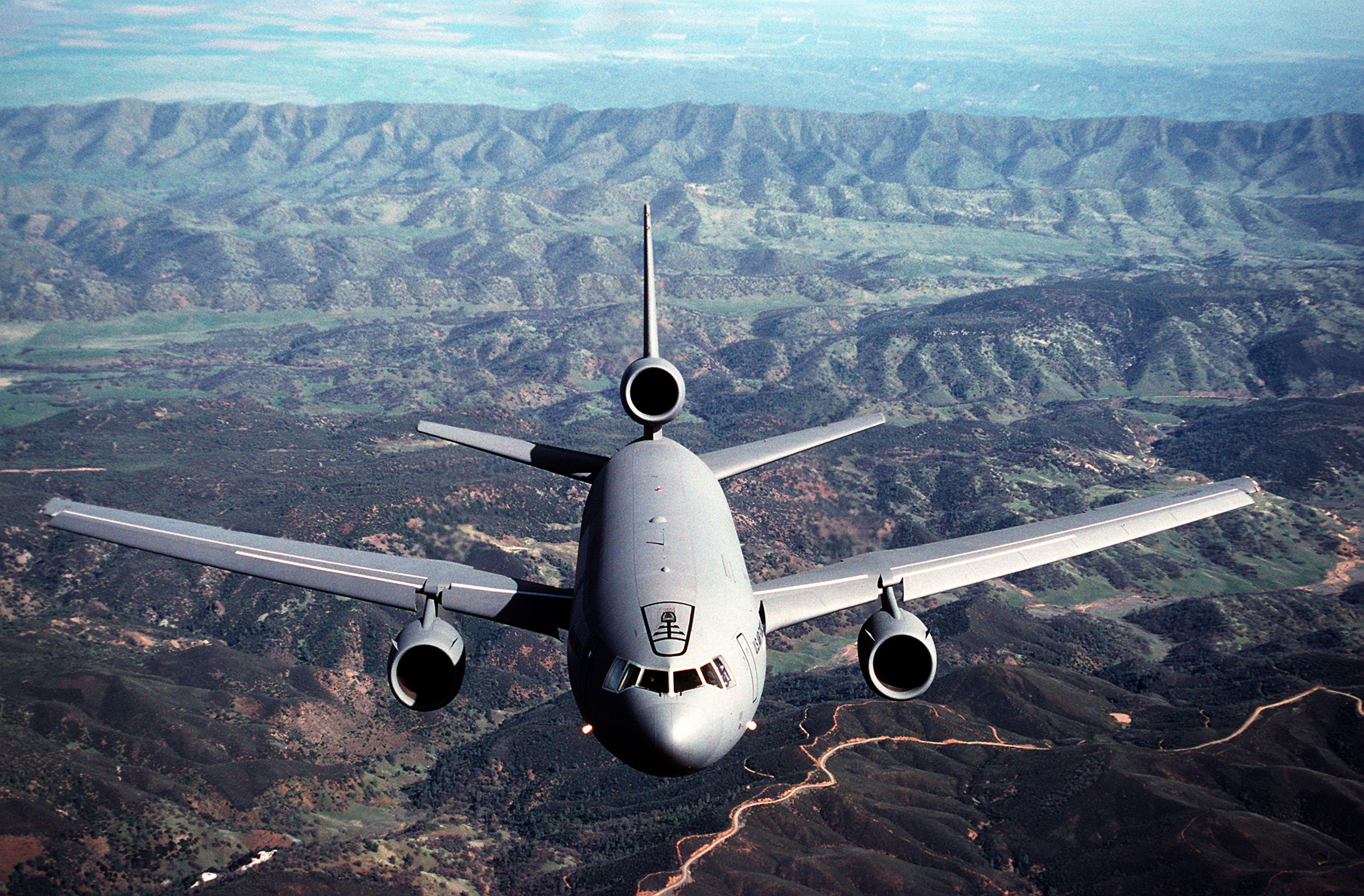
- A 79th Air Refueling Squadron KC-10A Extender near Travis Air Force Base
- Active: 1943–1945; 1948–1951; 1955–1958; 1966–1978; 1982–present
- Country: United States
- Branch: United States Air Force
- Role: Air refueling
- Part of: Air Force Reserve Command
- Garrison/HQ: Travis Air Force Base
- Mottos: Deterrence in Vigilance (1971–1978); Excellence in Reserve (1996–present)
- Engagements: Operation Overlord; Operation Dragoon; Operation Market Garden; Operation Varsity
- Decorations: Distinguished Unit Citation; Air Force Outstanding Unit Award; Republic of Vietnam Gallantry Cross with Palm
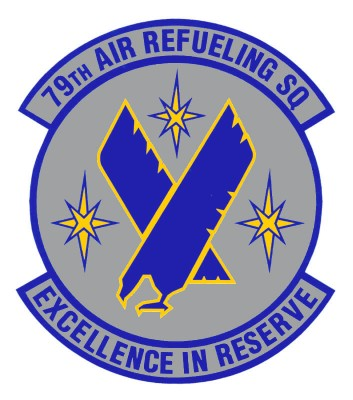
- Battle honours: identification_symbol =

Insignia
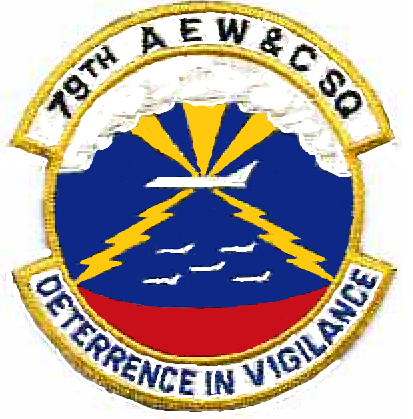
- 79th Airborne Early Warning & Control Squadron emblem

The 79th Air Refueling Squadron (79 ARS) is a United States Air Force Reserve squadron, assigned to the 349th Operations Group, stationed at Travis Air Force Base, California.

== History ==
=== World War II ===
79 ARS was constituted on March 23, 1943, and activated on April 1, 1943, by I Troop Carrier Command. From April 1, 1943 to November 15, 1945, 79 ARS was assigned to 436 Troop Carrier Group. Deployed to England, 79 ARS was assigned to IX Troop Carrier Command in early January 1944, during the Allied buildup prior to the invasion of France.

The squadron participated in the D-Day operation, dropping 101st Airborne Division paratroops near Cherbourg Naval Base, then carried out re-supply and glider delivery missions the following day.

The squadron's aircraft flew supplies into Normandy as soon as suitable landing strips were available and evacuated casualties to England. On 17 July the air echelon flew to Grosseto airbase in Italy to prepare for operations connected with the invasion of southern France returning to England on 24 August.

Squadron moved to France in July 1944 and for the balance of the Northern France Campaign and the Western Allied invasion of Germany was engaged in combat resupply of ground forces, operating from Advanced Landing Grounds in northern France. Delivered supplies to rough Resupply and Evacuation airfields near the front lines, returning combat casualties to field hospitals in rear areas. Dropped airborne forces during Operation Market-Garden in September 1944 into the Netherlands; later participated in the airborne invasion of Germany in March 1945. After V-E Day, the squadron evacuated prisoners of war. Returned to the United States in August 1945, became a transport squadron for Continental Air Command, Inactivated on 15 November 1945.

=== Reserve operations and Korean War mobilization ===
Operated in the reserve, 1948–1951 with C-47s, activated during the Korean War. Its personnel and aircraft assigned as fillers for active-duty units, inactivated a few days later as an administrative unit.

=== Reserve airlift operations ===
It performed worldwide airlift operations from, 1966–1971, including missions to Southeast Asia.

=== Early warning for the southern United States ===
The squadron also flew airborne early warning and control missions in the air defense of the United States, using Lockheed EC-121 Warning Stars from its base at Homestead AFB Florida, 1971–1978.

=== Reserve associate air refueling ===
Since 1982 it has trained for and flown worldwide air refueling and strategic airlift missions, including contingency and humanitarian relief operations. Supported Operations Enduring Freedom and Noble Eagle after the 11 September 2001 attack on the U. S.

=== Campaigns and decorations ===
- Campaigns. World War II: Rome-Arno; Normandy; Northern France; Southern France; Rhineland; Ardennes-Alsace; Central Europe.
- Decorations. Distinguished Unit Citation: France, [6–7] June 1944. Air Force Outstanding Unit Award with Combat "V" Device: 1 August 2002 – 15 August 2003. Air Force Outstanding Unit Awards: 1 December 1976 – 15 March 1978; 1 April 1984 – 31 March 1985; 1 July 1991 – 30 June 1993; 1 April – 15 August 1995; 1 July 1996 – 30 June 1998; 1 August 2000 – 31 July 2002; 16 August 2003 – 17 August 2004; 18 August 2004 – 17 August 2005; 18 August 2005 – 17 August 2006; 18 August 2006 – 17 August 2007; 18 August 2007 – 17 August 2008; 18 August 2008 – 17 August 2009. Republic of Vietnam Gallantry Cross with Palm: 1 July 1966 – 29 July 1971.

== Lineage ==
- Constituted as the 79th Troop Carrier Squadron on 23 March 1943

Activated on 1 April 1943
Inactivated on 15 November 1945

- Activated in the Reserve on 11 April 1948

Redesignated 79th Troop Carrier Squadron, Medium on 27 June 1949
Ordered to active service on 1 April 1951
Inactivated on 16 April 1951

- Activated in the Reserve on 18 May 1955

Inactivated on 15 May 1958

- Redesignated 79th Military Airlift Squadron and activated in the Reserve on 14 March 1966

Organized on 1 April 1966
Redesignated 79th Airborne Early Warning and Control Squadron on 30 June 1971
Inactivated on 1 October 1978

- Redesignated 79th Air Refueling Squadron, Heavy (Associate) on 21 June 1982

Activated in the Reserve on 1 September 1982
Redesignated 79th Air Refueling Squadron (Associate) on 1 February 1992
Redesignated 79th Air Refueling Squadron on 1 October 1994

=== Assignments ===
- 436th Troop Carrier Group, 1 April 1943 – 15 November 1945
- 419th Troop Carrier Group, 11 April 1948
- 436th Troop Carrier Group, 27 June 1949 – 16 April 1951
- 436th Troop Carrier Group, 18 May 1955 – 15 May 1958
- Continental Air Command, 14 March 1966
- 915th Military Airlift Group, 1 April 1966
- Eastern Air Force Reserve Region, 30 July 1971
- Tenth Air Force, 8 October 1976
- 915th Airborne Early Warning and Control Group, 1 December 1976 – 1 October 1978
- 452d Air Refueling Wing, 1 September 1982
- 452d Operations Group, 1 August 1992
- 349th Operations Group, 1 April 1995 – present

=== Stations ===
- Baer Field, Indiana, 1 April 1943
- Alliance Army Air Field, Nebraska, 2 May 1943
- Laurinburg-Maxton Army Air Base, North Carolina, 4 August 1943
- Baer Field, Indiana, 16–28 December 1943
- RAF Bottesford (AAF-481), England, January 1944
- RAF Membury (AAF-466), England, 3 March 1944 – February 1945

Operated from Voltone Airfield, Italy, 20 July – 23 August 1944

- Mourmelon-le-Grand Airfield (A-80), France, February – July 1945
- Baer Field, Indiana, 13 August 1945
- Malden Army Air Field, Missouri, 8 September – 15 November 1945
- Norfolk Municipal Airport, Virginia, 11 April 1948
- Godman Air Force Base, Kentucky, 27 June 1949
- Standiford Field, Kentucky, 20 October 1950 – 16 April 195
- Floyd Bennett Field (later U.S. Naval Air Station, New York), New York, 18 May 1955 – 15 May 1958
- Homestead Air Force Base, Florida, 1 April 1966 – 1 October 1978
- March Air Force Base, California, 1 September 1982
- Travis Air Force Base, California, 1 April 1995 – present

=== Aircraft ===
- C-47 Skytrain (1943–1945, 1948–1951)
- T-7 Navigator (1948–1951)
- Beechcraft T-11 Kansan (1948–1951)
- C-46 Commando (1955–1958)
- C-119 Flying Boxcar (1957–1958)
- C-124 Globemaster II (1966–1971)
- C-121 Constellation (1971–1973, 1976–1978)
- EC-121 Warning Star (1971–1978)
- KC-10 Extender (1982–2024)
- KC-46 Pegasus (2023–present)
