= Christina Bellin =

American model

Christina P. Bellin (1939 – 27 April 1988, New York City) was an Italian-born American model and an international social figure who was born in New York City. Her full name was Maria Christina Orfea Paolozzi di Chiusi Bellin.

== Early life ==
Bellin was the daughter of Alice "Alicia" Orpha Spaulding (12 May 1917, Boston – 13 April 2002, New York City), a United Fruit Company heiress, and Count Lorenzo Paolozzi, a Roman aristocrat. She grew up at the Villa Paolozzi in Rome, Italy (1949–1952) and was educated in Switzerland and at the Madeira School in McLean, Virginia, USA.

== Photographer's model ==
Bellin began modeling at the age of 17. She posed for a topless photograph taken by Richard Avedon in Harper's Bazaar in 1962. The picture caused a sensation because at the time fashion magazines did not publish unclothed figures.

== Marriage and divorce ==
In 1964 Bellin married Dr. Howard Bellin, a plastic surgeon. The couple gave "lively parties attended by an eclectic group which included Andy Warhol, Jacob Javits, Zsa Zsa Gabor, karate instructors, and almost any glamorous personality who was visiting New York at the time".

The Bellins divorced in 1982 and remarried again four months later when Mrs. Bellin fell ill. They divorced a second time when she seemed to be recovering.

At the end of her life, she raised money for hospitals, in Cambodia and Gabon, and for orphanages in Afghanistan, and was known to have supported eighteen foster children.

== Death ==
Christina Bellin died of a brain tumor at her Manhattan home in 1988. She was nearly 49 years old. She was survived by two sons, Marco and Andy, and her sister, Francesca (Padilla). Her funeral was held at St. James Church at Madison Avenue and 71st Street in Manhattan.
