= Jana Bellin =

English chess player (born 1947)

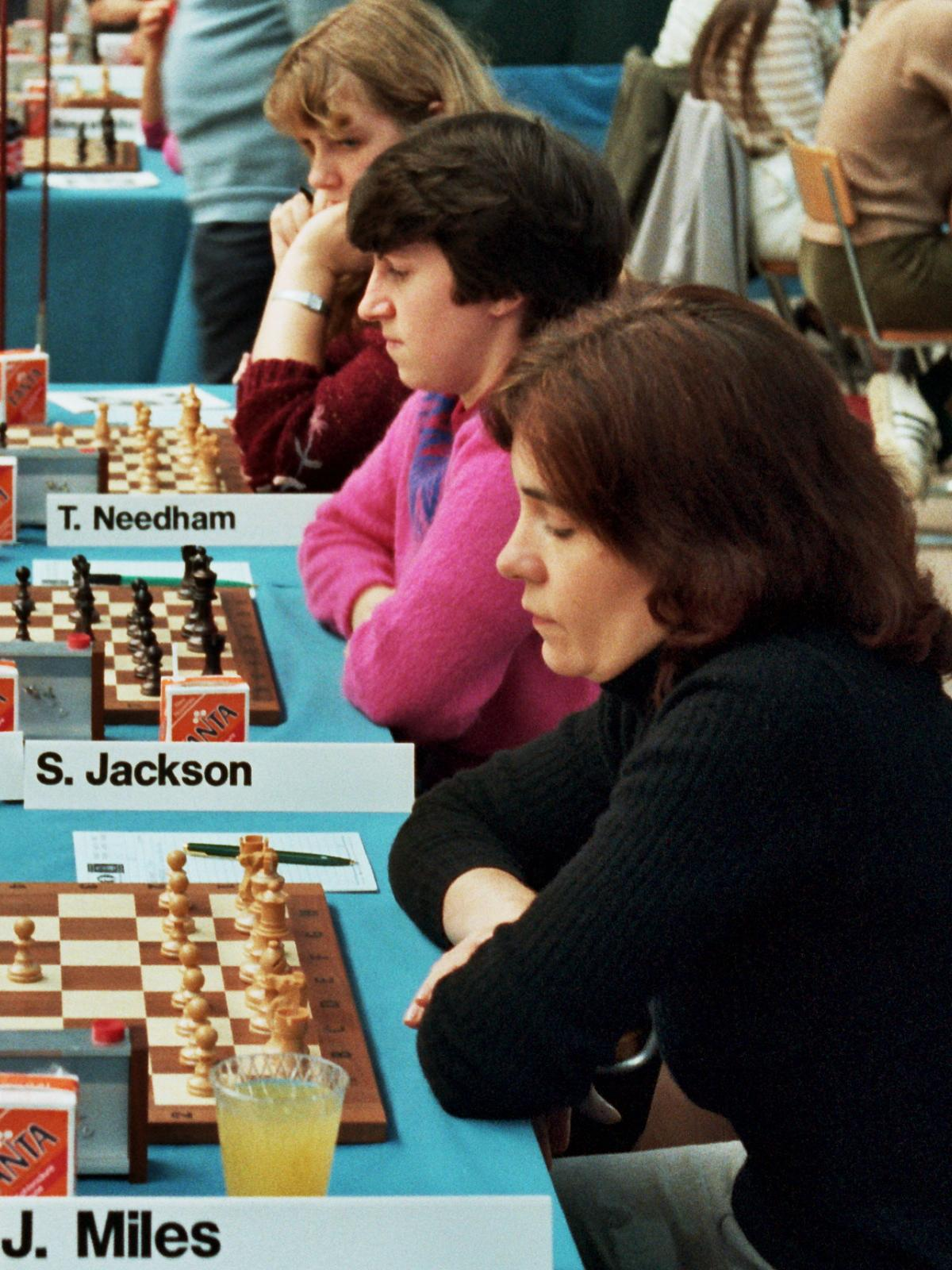
- Jana Miles (Bellin), Olympiad Luzern 1982

Personal information
- Born: 9 December 1947 (age 78) Prague, Czechoslovakia
- Spouses: William Hartston (m. 1970, divorced) Tony Miles (divorced) Robert Bellin

Chess career
- Country: England
- Title: Woman Grandmaster (1983)
- Peak rating: 2340 (January 1987)

Jana Bellin (née Malypetrová; born 9 December 1947) is a British, formerly Czechoslovak chess player. She was awarded the Woman International Master chess title in 1969 and the Woman Grandmaster title in 1982.

Bellin was born in Prague, Czechoslovakia. She was the Czech Women's Champion in 1965 and 1967 under her maiden name of Malypetrová. After her marriage to William Hartston she moved to England in 1970 and won the British Women's Championship in 1970, 1971, 1972, 1973, 1974, 1976, 1977 (after a play-off), and 1979. She has fifteen appearances in the Women's Chess Olympiads, representing Czechoslovakia in 1966 and 1969 and England thirteen times from 1972 through 2006, seven times on first board. At the Olympiad she earned individual silver medals in 1966 and 1976, a team bronze medal in 1968 with the Czechoslovak team, and a team silver in 1976 with England.

Bellin is a medical doctor specialising in anaesthetics, and works in intensive care at Sandwell General Hospital, West Bromwich, England.

She is also Chairman of the FIDE Medical Commission, which supervises drug testing of chess players.

Bellin was married first to International Master William Hartston, then to Grandmaster Tony Miles, and after that to International Master Robert Bellin. She and Bellin have two sons: Robert (born 1989) and Christopher (born 1991).

She is the granddaughter of thrice-Prime Minister of Czechoslovakia Jan Malypetr and cousin of author and human rights campaigner Jiří Stránský.
