= Robert Bellin =

English chess player (born 1952)

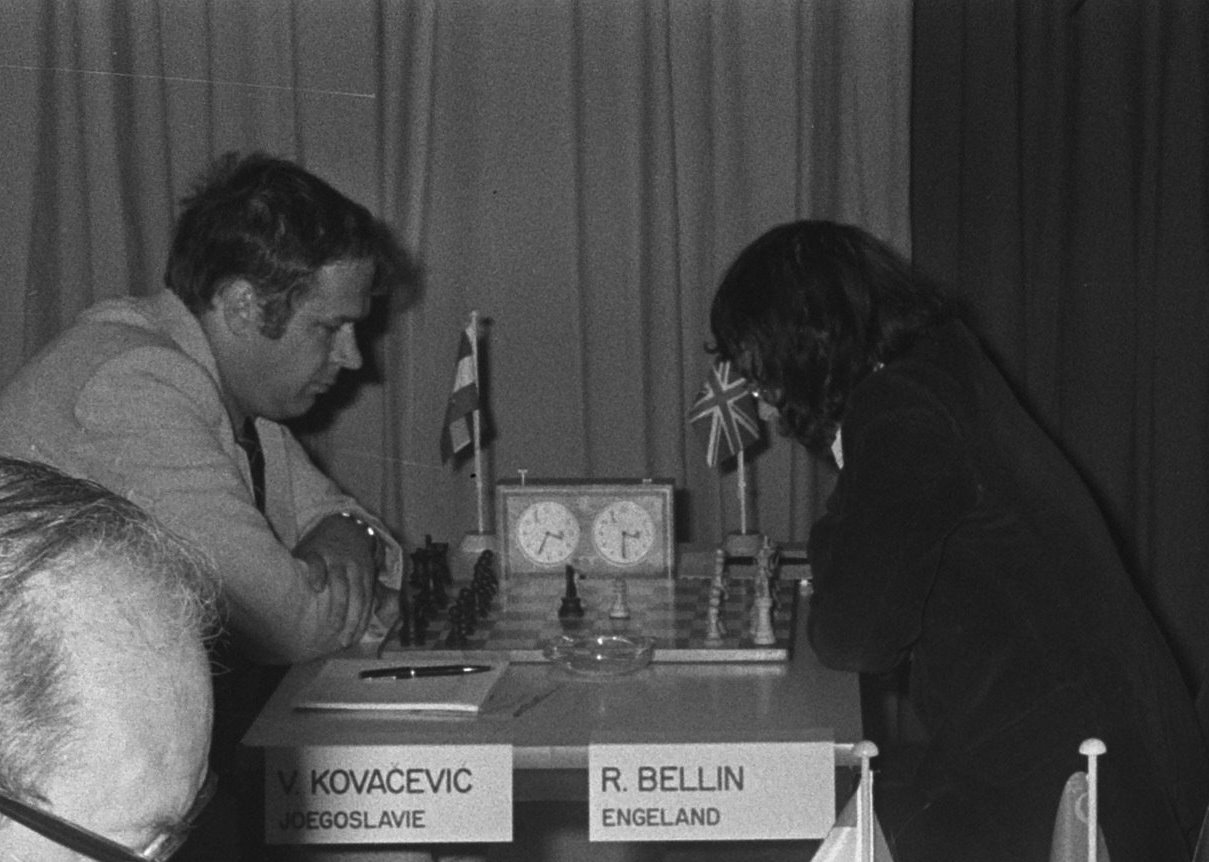
- Robert Bellin in 1973

Personal information
- Born: 30 June 1952 (age 74) Great Yarmouth, Norfolk, England
- Spouse: Jana Malypetrová

Chess career
- Country: England
- Title: International Master (1978)
- FIDE rating: 2313 (May 2019)
- Peak rating: 2440 (January 1980)

Robert Bellin (born 30 June 1952) is an English chess International Master (1978). He is a British Chess Championship winner (1979) and European Team Chess Championship bronze medalist (1980).

== Biography ==
At the end of the 1970s, Robert Bellin was one of the leading chess players in England. In 1978, he won the B tournament of the Wijk aan Zee Chess Festival. In 1979, Robert Bellin won the British Chess Championship.

Robert Bellin played for England in the European Team Chess Championships:

- In 1977, at eighth board in the 6th European Team Chess Championship in Moscow (+1, =3, -2),
- In 1980, at eighth board in the 7th European Team Chess Championship in Skara (+0, =2, -1) and won team bronze medal.

Robert Bellin played for England in the Clare Benedict Cup:

- In 1974, at reserve board in the 21st Clare Benedict Chess Cup in Cala Galdana (+2, =2, -0) and won team gold medal.

In 1978, Robert Bellin was awarded the FIDE International Master (IM) title. In 2016 he received the FIDE Trainer title.

Robert Bellin wrote several books on chess, mainly devoted to Chess opening theory.

He was married to Czech origin International Women's Chess Grandmaster (WGM) Jana Bellin. The marriage has two children: Robert Alexander (born in 1989) and Christopher John (born in 1991).
