= Andy Bellin =

American director and screenwriter

Andy Bellin is an American director and screenwriter, whose credits include the 2013 film Lovelace and the 2011 Clive Owen film Trust. He is the son of Italian-born model Christina Bellin and New York plastic surgeon Dr. Howard Bellin.
