= Homestead Air Reserve Base =

United States Air Force base near Homestead, Florida

- Homestead, Florida in the United States of America
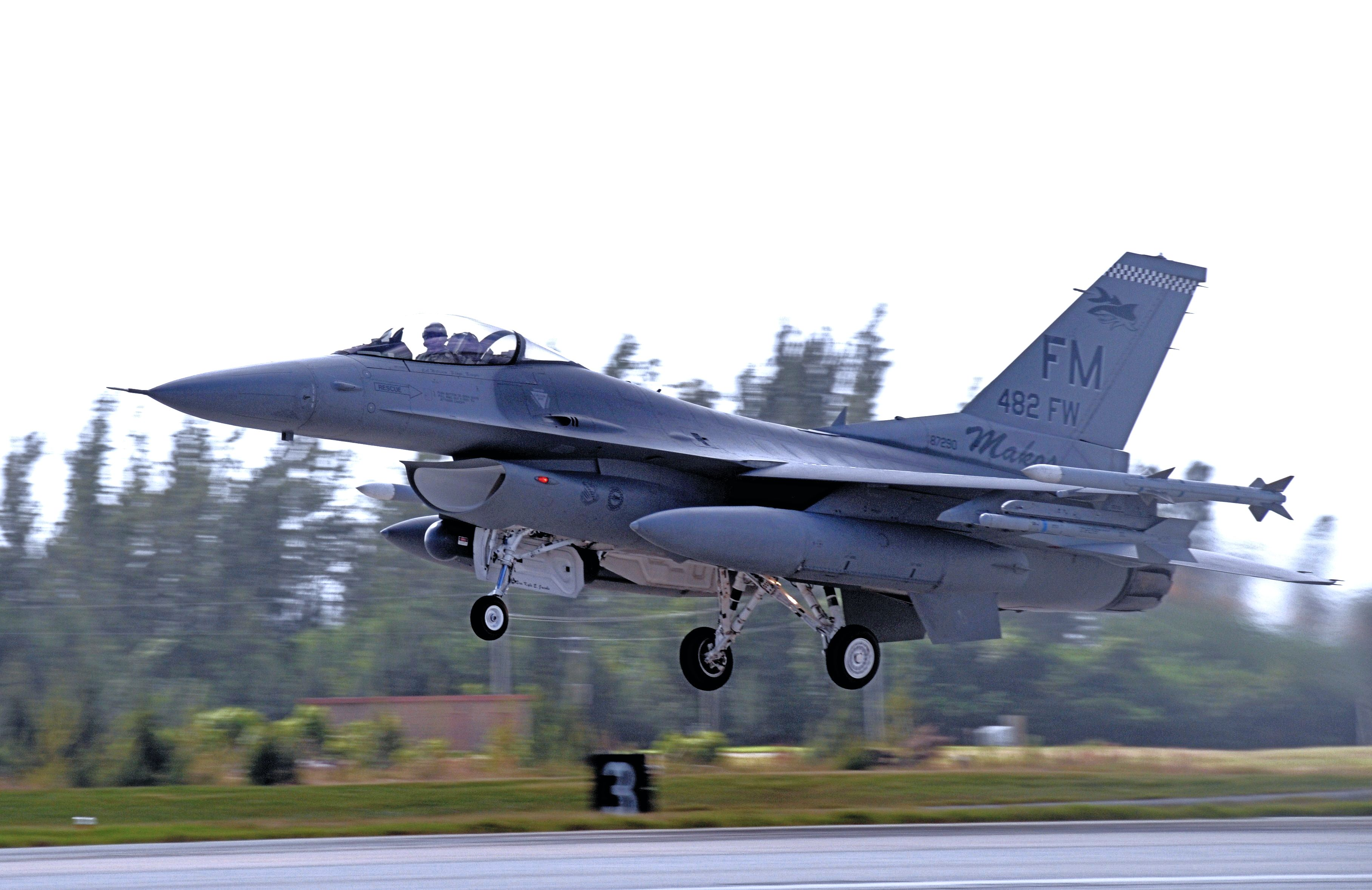
- An F-16C Fighting Falcon assigned to the 482nd Fighter Wing takes off from Homestead ARB.

Site information
- Type: Air Force Reserve base
- Owner: Department of Defense
- Operator: US Air Force (USAF)
- Controlled by: Air Force Reserve Command (AFRC)
- Condition: Operational
- Website: www.homestead.afrc.af.mil

Location
- Location in the United States Homestead ARB (the United States) Homestead ARB (North America) Homestead ARB (North Atlantic) Homestead ARB (the Caribbean)
- Coordinates: 25°29′18″N 080°23′01″W

Site history
- Built: 1942 (as Homestead Army Air Field)
- In use: 1942–present

Garrison information
- Current commander: Colonel David M. Castaneda
- Garrison: 482d Fighter Wing (host)

Airfield information
- Identifiers: IATA: HST, ICAO: KHST, FAA LID: HST, WMO: 722026
- Elevation: 1.8 metres (5 ft 11 in) AMSL
Runways
Direction	Length and surface
06/24	3,414 metres (11,201 ft) concrete

Homestead Air Reserve Base (IATA: HST, ICAO: KHST, FAA LID: HST) (Homestead ARB), previously known as Homestead Air Force Base (Homestead AFB) is located in Miami–Dade County, Florida, to the northeast of the city of Homestead. It is home to the 482nd Fighter Wing (482 FW) of the Air Force Reserve Command's Tenth Air Force (10 AF), as well as the headquarters of Special Operations Command South.

Much of Homestead Air Force Base was destroyed by Hurricane Andrew in 1992 and subsequently rebuilt.

== History ==
=== World War II ===
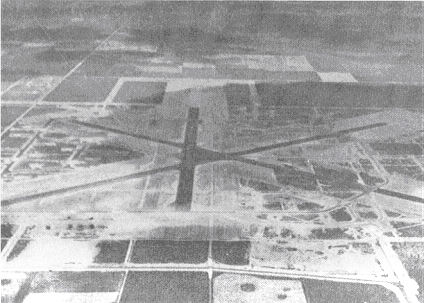
Aerial photo of Homestead Army Airfield – 1943

The installation was named Homestead Army Air Field on 16 September 1942 as a base for the United States Army Air Forces during World War II, and construction began the next day. Homestead opened as an Air Transport Command (ATC) ferry airfield in November; ATC pilots were trained at the base from February 1943 in the C-46, C-54 and C-87 aircraft. The base was heavily damaged by a hurricane in September 1945, resulting in its inactivation on 14 December 1945. When the U.S. Air Force was established as a separate service on 18 September 1947, the old Homestead AAF lay in ruins.

=== Cold War and Vietnam War ===
Reactivated for the Cold War as a Strategic Air Command (SAC) installation, an advance team arrived at the old base in the summer of 1954 and initiated clean-up and reconstruction efforts. The installation was renamed as Homestead Air Force Base on 1 February 1955 and the 379th Bombardment Wing (379 BMW) was activated at Homestead AFB on 1 November 1955. The 379 BMW replaced the 4276th Air Base Squadron, the latter unit having overseen the reconstruction of the base, and spent the next few months becoming organized and manned. The 379 BMW received B-47E Stratojet and KC-97G Stratofreighter aircraft in April 1956 and began training for strategic bombardment and air refueling operations. The U.S. Navy also established Naval Security Group Activity Homestead (NAVSECGRUACT Homestead) as a tenant command at Homestead AFB in June 1957.

The 19th Bombardment Wing (19 BMW) moved to Homestead AFB from Pinecastle Air Force Base, Florida in April 1956 and also flew the B-47 and KC-97.

The 379 BMW moved to Wurtsmith Air Force Base, Michigan without equipment in January 1961 in preparation for transition to the B-52H Stratofortress and KC-135A Stratotanker.

In 1960, three Air Force Reserve (AFRES) units previously located at Miami International Airport, the 301st Air Rescue Squadron with its SA-16 (later redesignated as HU-16) Albatross amphibious air-sea rescue aircraft and the 435th Troop Carrier Wing (435 TCW) and its 76th Troop Carrier Squadron (76 TCS) with C-119 Flying Boxcar aircraft relocated to Homestead AFB.

On 1 July 1961, the 19 BMW was redesignated as the 19th Bombardment Wing (Heavy) and began converting to the B-52H and KC-135A.

In 1962, the 31st Tactical Fighter Wing, a unit of the Tactical Air Command (TAC), relocated to Homestead AFB from George Air Force Base, California with its F-100 Super Sabre jet fighters and established itself as a TAC tenant unit at Homestead, the base remaining under SAC control. Homestead AFB also figured prominently during the October 1962 Cuban Missile Crisis. All SAC aircraft of the 19 BMW were dispersed while the 31 TFW was augmented by additional F-100 aircraft from the 401st Tactical Fighter Wing (401 TFW) from England AFB, Louisiana and the 474th Tactical Fighter Wing (474 TFW) from Cannon AFB, New Mexico. This combined organization, designated the 1st Provisional Air Division, was composed of over 181 F-100 fighter-bombers and over 1600 pilots and forward deployed aircraft maintenance personnel.

Over 10,000 U.S. Army personnel were also deployed to Homestead AFB and housed in a tent city in preparation for a possible land invasion of Cuba. Additional U.S. Army air defense artillery personnel manned several MIM-23 Hawk mobile surface-to-air missile (SAM) batteries and AN/MPQ-35 search radars that were place around the base for defense against Soviet and/or Cuban aircraft. The 512th Troop Carrier Wing (512 TCW), an AFRES unit operationally gained by TAC and based at NAS Willow Grove, Pennsylvania, was also called to active service and forward deployed to Homestead AFB with its C-119 aircraft, augmenting the 435 TCW for possible air drop of U.S. Army personnel into Cuba incipient to a ground invasion of the island. Following the peaceful resolution of the crisis, forward deployed TAC and AFRES units returned to their home stations and the 19 BMW aircraft returned to Homestead AFB.

U.S. Army personnel other than Hawk air defense crews also returned to home garrisons. Hawk air defense systems and personnel would later be replaced by an enhanced U.S. Army air defense artillery presence in South Florida from the Miami area to Key West in what would become the Miami-Homestead Air Defense Area of the U.S. Army Air Defense Command (ARADCOM). The ARADCOM functional activities came under the aegis of the 6th Battalion, 65th Artillery (later renamed the 6th Battalion, 65th Air Defense Artillery) operating a combination of MIM-13 Hawk and fixed-site MIM-3 Nike Ajax, later upgraded to MIM-14 Nike Hercules, surface-to-air missile (SAM) batteries and associated radar and command and control sites. These Army air defense facilities would remain in operation at Homestead AFB and across South Florida until 1979. One of these sites, Nike Missile Site HM-69 located just west of Homestead ARB, remains preserved today and open to the public under the auspices of the National Park Service.

On 11 February 1963, the 915th Troop Carrier Group (915 TCG) was activated as a TAC-gained AFRES organization at Homestead AFB under the 435 TCW, with the 76 TCS as a subordinate unit.

1965 and 1966 also saw significant changes to AFRES and Air National Guard (ANG) operations at Homestead AFB. In early 1965, given increased concerns of the Air Defense Command (ADC) regarding Soviet Air Force activity in Cuba, Detachment 1 of the 125th Fighter Interceptor Group (125 FIG, Det 1) of the Florida Air National Guard was established at Homestead AFB with no less than two armed F-102A Delta Dagger aircraft and a combination of full-time Air Reserve Technician (ART) personnel and drilling Traditional Guardsmen (TG) / Drill Status Guardsmen (DSG) on 24/7/365 alert, rotated from the group's home station at Imeson Airport in Jacksonville, Florida. This detachment would also become known as FL ANG Operating Location ALPHA ALPHA (OL-AA).

On 1 December 1965, the 435 TCW inactivated and the 915 TCG was redesignated the 915th Air Transport Group (915 ATG). The next change was the January 1966 redesignation of the 301 ARS as the 301st Aerospace Rescue and Recovery Squadron (301 ARRS). This was followed on 1 April 1966 by the redesignation of the 915 ATG as the 915th Military Airlift Group (915 MAG), inactivation of the group's 76 TCS, and activation of the 79th Military Airlift Squadron (79 MAS) at Homestead AFB flying the C-124C Globemaster II, all on the same day.

With the impending departure of the 19 BMW, control of Homestead AFB passed from SAC to TAC on 1 July 1968. However, with the 31 TFW deployed to Southeast Asia for combat operations over Vietnam, the 4531st Tactical Fighter Wing was established as a provisional unit for host wing duties at Homestead AFB pending the return of the 31 TFW in 1970. While the 31 TFW was deployed, the 19 BMW moved without personnel or equipment on 25 July 1968 to Robins Air Force Base, Georgia, and absorbing the resources of the 465th Bombardment Wing (465 BMW) at Robins AFB and marking the end home-based B-52 and KC-135 operations at Homestead AFB.

The year 1971 also saw extensive changes at Homestead AFB. Following its return from Southeast Asia, the 31 TFW transitioned from the F-100 to the F-4E Phantom II and performed concurrent missions of air defense of southern Florida in tandem with the Florida ANG's 125 FIG detachment, combat crew replacement training in the F-4E in two fighter squadrons, and a third F-4E fighter squadron combat-coded for overseas deployment. At the same time, among the AFRES units, the 301 ARS acquired former SH-34J Seabat helicopters from the US Navy, redesignating them as HH-34Js and providing a rotary-wing capability in addition to their amphibious fixed-wing capability. The 915 MAG also inactivated and the 79 MAS retired its C-124C aircraft, shifting to an airborne early warning mission with EC-121T Warning Star aircraft and being redesignated as the 79th Airborne Early Warning and Control Squadron (79 AEW&CS), operationally-gained by ADC.

When President Richard Nixon visited his home at Key Biscayne, Air Force One landed at Homestead AFB.

=== Cold War operations after the Vietnam War ===
With the end of combat operations in Vietnam in 1973, Homestead AFB and its host and tenant units were re-centered on Cold War mission taskings. The 301 ARRS transitioned to an all rotary-wing unit, retiring its last HU-16 and acquiring HH-1H Iroqouis (“Huey”) helicopters in addition to its HH-34Js. During 1973 and 1974, the 125 FIG (to include 125 FIG, Det 1) exchanged its F-102 aircraft for F-106A and F-106B Delta Dart aircraft transferred from the Regular Air Force. This was followed between 1974 and 1975 with the 301 ARRS replacing its HH-34Js with HH-3E Jolly Green Giant helicopters transferred from the Regular Air Force. On 1 December 1976, the former 915 MAG was also reactivated as the 915th Airborne Early Warning and Control Group (915 AEW&CG), again with the 79 AEW&CS as a subordinate unit.

With the impending phaseout of the EC-121 as the new E-3A Sentry aircraft, also known as the Airborne Warning and Control System (AWACS), entered the USAF inventory, the 915 AEW&CG was redesignated the 915th Tactical Fighter Group (915 TFG) on 1 October 1978 with the retirement of its EC-121T aircraft. The 79 AEW&CS was also inactivated and the 93rd Tactical Fighter Squadron (93 TFS) was activated at Homestead AFB with F-4C Phantom II aircraft. The following year, ADC was also inactivated and all its former assets and units were transferred to TAC, to include shifting the 125 FIG and its Det 1 to the operational claimancy of TAC.

In 1979 and 1980, the 31 TFW transferred its F-4E aircraft to ANG units and the Egyptian Air Force and transitioned to the F-4D Phantom II, eventually assuming a Formal Training Unit (FTU) role for the F-4D. Also in 1979, the 301 ARRS retired its HH-1H aircraft and acquired HC-130P/N Hercules search and rescue aircraft, returning to a dual fixed-wing and rotary-wing fleet.

With its new emphasis as the F-4D FTU, the 31 TFW was redesignated as the 31st Tactical Training Wing (31 TTW) in March 1981 while retaining host wing responsibilities for Homestead AFB. In addition to the organizational changes in TAC modifying the 31 TTW mission, concurrent changes in AFRES in April 1981 resulted in the inactivation of the 915 TFG and its replacement replaced by the newly activated 482nd Tactical Fighter Wing (482 TFW), absorbing the personnel and assets of the 915th while maintaining the extant 93 TFS as its operational flying squadron.

In 1985, the 31 TTW began retiring the F-4D, relinquishing the FTU mission and transitioning to the F-16A and F-16B Fighting Falcon aircraft as a fully combat coded unit, resulting in the wing again being redesignated as the 31st Tactical Fighter Wing (31 TFW). In 1987, the 125 FIG also commenced replacement of its F-106 aircraft with F-16A and F-16B aircraft at home station in its F-16 Air Defense Fighter (F-16A/B ADF) variant, which was also reflected in rotational alert aircraft at 125 FIG, Det 1. By 1989, the 482 TFW also began retiring its F-4C aircraft and transitioning to the F-16A and F-16B. Finally, in 1990, the 301 ARRS was again redesignated as the 301st Air Rescue Squadron (301 ARS).

Following Operation Desert Storm in spring 1991, the 31 TFW began retiring its F-16A and F-16B aircraft and transitioning to the F-16C and F-16D Block 40 variant.

In 1992, the Air Force went through its most massive structural reorganization since its establishment as a separate service in September 1947. This included the inactivation of TAC and its succession by the Air Combat Command (ACC) on 1 June 1992. With this change, all flying units at Homestead AFB became part of ACC, either directly in the case of active duty units, or operationally-gained in the case of assigned AFRES and ANG units. As an ACC installation, Homestead AFB's 31 TFW also became the 31st Fighter Wing (31 FW), the 482 TFW became the 482nd Fighter Wing (482 FW), and the subordinate tactical fighter squadrons in both wings were redesignated as fighter squadrons (FS). At the same time, the 301 ARS, which had been in the process of retiring its HH-3E aircraft and replacing them with HH-60G Pave Hawk helicopters, was redesignated as the 301st Rescue Squadron (301 RQS), while the parent unit for 125 FIG, Det 1 was redesignated as the 125th Fighter Group (125 FG).

=== Post–Cold War and Hurricane Andrew ===
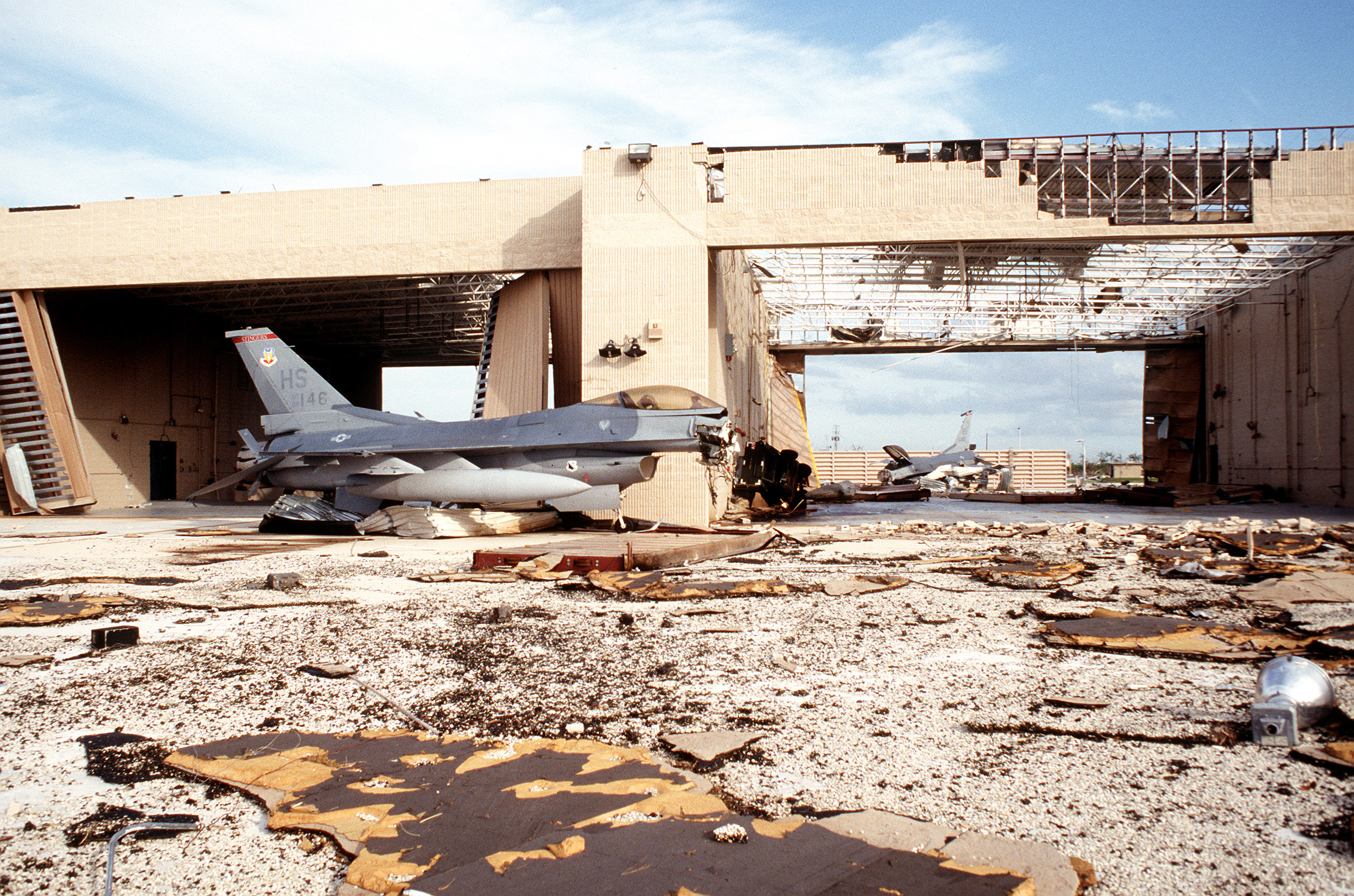
Homestead AFB after Hurricane Andrew severely damaged the base on 27 August 1992

As Hurricane Andrew approached South Florida in late August 1992, the base evacuated their F-16 fighter aircraft, with the 31 TFW aircraft going to Wright-Patterson Air Force Base near Dayton, Ohio; the 482 FW aircraft to MacDill Air Force Base in Tampa, Florida; the 125 FIG Det 1 aircraft to their home station of Jacksonville ANGB; and the 301 RQS rescue aircraft to Patrick Air Force Base at Cocoa Beach, Florida. All base personnel and their families were under evacuation orders prior to the arrival of the Category 5 storm.

The storm-related damage and destruction at Homestead AFB was extensive and precluded any immediate return of home station units, especially those conducting or in direct support of operational flying missions. The 31 FW and essential personnel stayed at Wright-Patterson AFB until April 1993, at which point they were transferred back to MacDill AFB. The 125 FIG Det 1 would take up temporary residence at Naval Air Station Key West, Florida, utilizing fighter alert facilities dating from the Cuban Missile Crisis while the 482 FW would remain at MacDill. Given the extent of damage, the U.S. Navy elected to close NAVSECGRUACT Homestead at Homestead AFB in June 1993.

The stay at MacDill AFB and NAS Key West for the fighter aircraft was short-lived as the 31 FW, 482 FW, and 125 FW Det 1 returned to Homestead in March 1994 while the 301 RQS aircraft and personnel permanently remained at Patrick AFB, eventually evolving into the present day 920th Rescue Wing. During this time, Homestead AFB was placed on the Base Realignment and Closure Commission's initial base closings list, potentially dooming the base to closure. However, the BRAC Commission recommended retaining Homestead AFB and rebuilding and realigning the installation as an AFRES installation.

=== Transfer to Air Force Reserve ===
The 31 FW inactivated on 1 April 1994, reactivating the same day without personnel or equipment at Aviano Air Base, Italy where it assumed the assets of the 401st Fighter Wing (401 FW), a US Air Forces in Europe (USAFE) organization. The same day, Homestead AFB transferred from ACC to AFRES control and was renamed Homestead Air Reserve Station with the 482 FW as the new host wing.

As part of the BRAC process, the acreage "footprint" of the base was reduced and some portions of the base were declared surplus and relinquished from DoD control, with the real estate and/or extant structures transferred to the control of local municipal entities, i.e., City of Homestead, Miami-Dade County, etc. For a period, transfer of the runway and airfield proper to Miami-Dade County was also considered, with the base envisioned for conversion to a joint civilian-military airport.

In February 1995, Homestead ARS again faced potential closure from the 1995 BRAC, which sought to close the ravaged station. The civilian community, including state and federal government leaders, rallied in support of the station, and launched a fight for the station's survival. The BRAC Commission subsequently withdrew Homestead ARS from the closure list in June 1995. In 1997, AFRES was redesignated from a Field Operating Agency to Air Force Reserve Command (AFRC), an Air Force Major Command (MAJCOM), and Homestead ARS became an AFRC installation. In December 2003, Homestead ARS was again redesignated to its current name of Homestead Air Reserve Base.

However, for a third time, Homestead ARB again faced potential closure, this time from the 2005 BRAC Commission. The base received numerous visits throughout the year from government decision makers and the BRAC Commission eventually decided to keep Homestead ARB open, to include redistributing nine more F-16 aircraft from other Air Reserve Component F-16 bases that were changing to aircraft other than the F-16 or losing flying missions outright.

Ultimately, most of the base, to include the runway and airfield proper, remained under DoD control and completed its conversion from an active duty base to its present-day reserve base configuration with the 482 FW as the host wing and continuing to fly its F-16C/D Block 30 fighter aircraft. The active duty 367th Fighter Squadron (367 FS) was added as an ACC Active Associate F-16 unit to the 482 FW in 2015, while the base concurrently maintains a 24/7/365 alert detachment of armed F-15C Eagle fighter aircraft from the Florida ANG's 125th Fighter Wing Detachment 1 (125 FW Det 1) conducting the Continental NORAD Region (CONR) air sovereignty/air defense mission of the southeastern United States.

== Based units ==
Flying and notable non-flying units based at Homestead Air Reserve Base.

Units marked GSU are Geographically Separate Units, which, although based at Homestead ARB, are subordinate to a parent unit based at another location.

=== United States Air Force ===
Air Force Reserve Command (AFRC)

Tenth Air Force

- 482nd Fighter Wing (host wing)
  - 482nd Operations Group
    - 93rd Fighter Squadron –
      F-16C/D Fighting Falcon

Air Combat Command (ACC)

- Ninth Air Force
  - 495th Fighter Group
    - 367th Fighter Squadron (GSU) – F-16C/D Fighting Falcon

Air National Guard (ANG)

- Florida Air National Guard
  - 125th Fighter Wing
    - Detachment 1 (GSU) – F-15C Eagle

=== Department of Defense ===
United States Special Operations Command

- Headquarters US Special Operations Command Southern

=== United States Army ===
- Florida Army National Guard
  - Headquarters 50th Regional Support Group
    - Alpha Company 146th Expeditionary Signal Battalion-Enhanced

=== United States Coast Guard ===
Atlantic Area

- Maritime Safety and Security Team Miami

=== United States Customs and Border Protection ===
U.S. Customs and Border Protection - Air and Marine Operations, Miami Air and Marine Branch

== Gallery ==
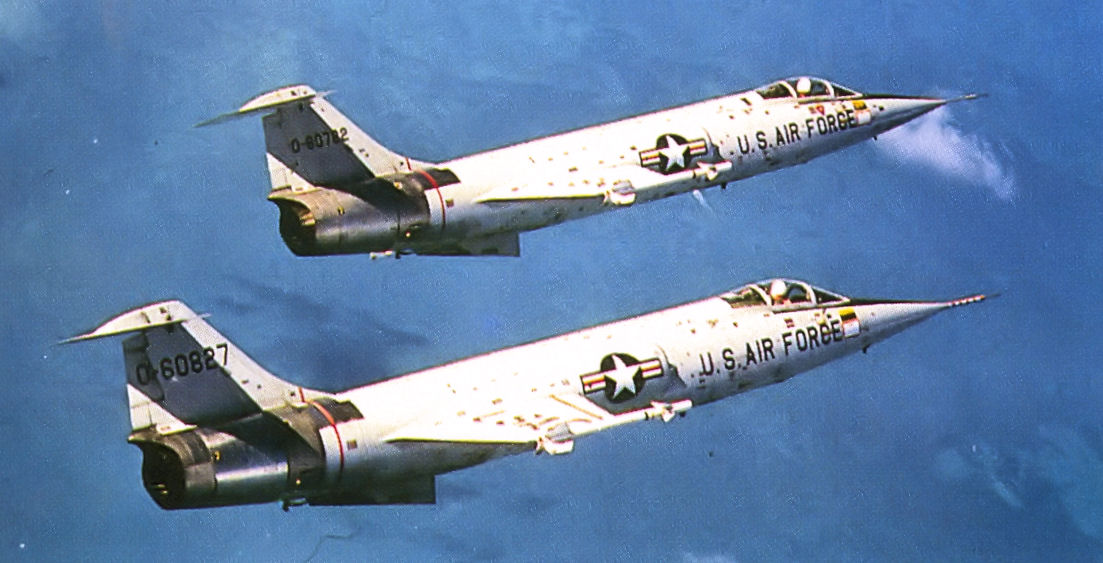
F-104As of the 319th Fighter-Interceptor Squadron over Biscayne Bay

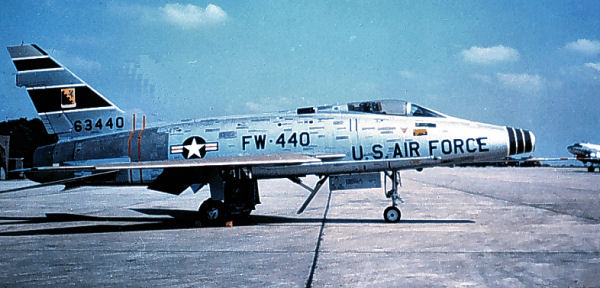
F-100D-85-NH (s/n 56-3440) of the 308th Tactical Fighter Squadron

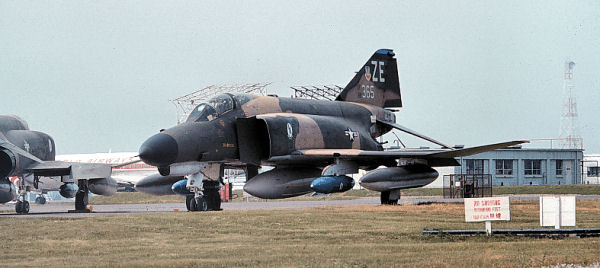
F-4E-37-MC Phantom II (s/n 68-0365) of the 309th TFS, about 1971

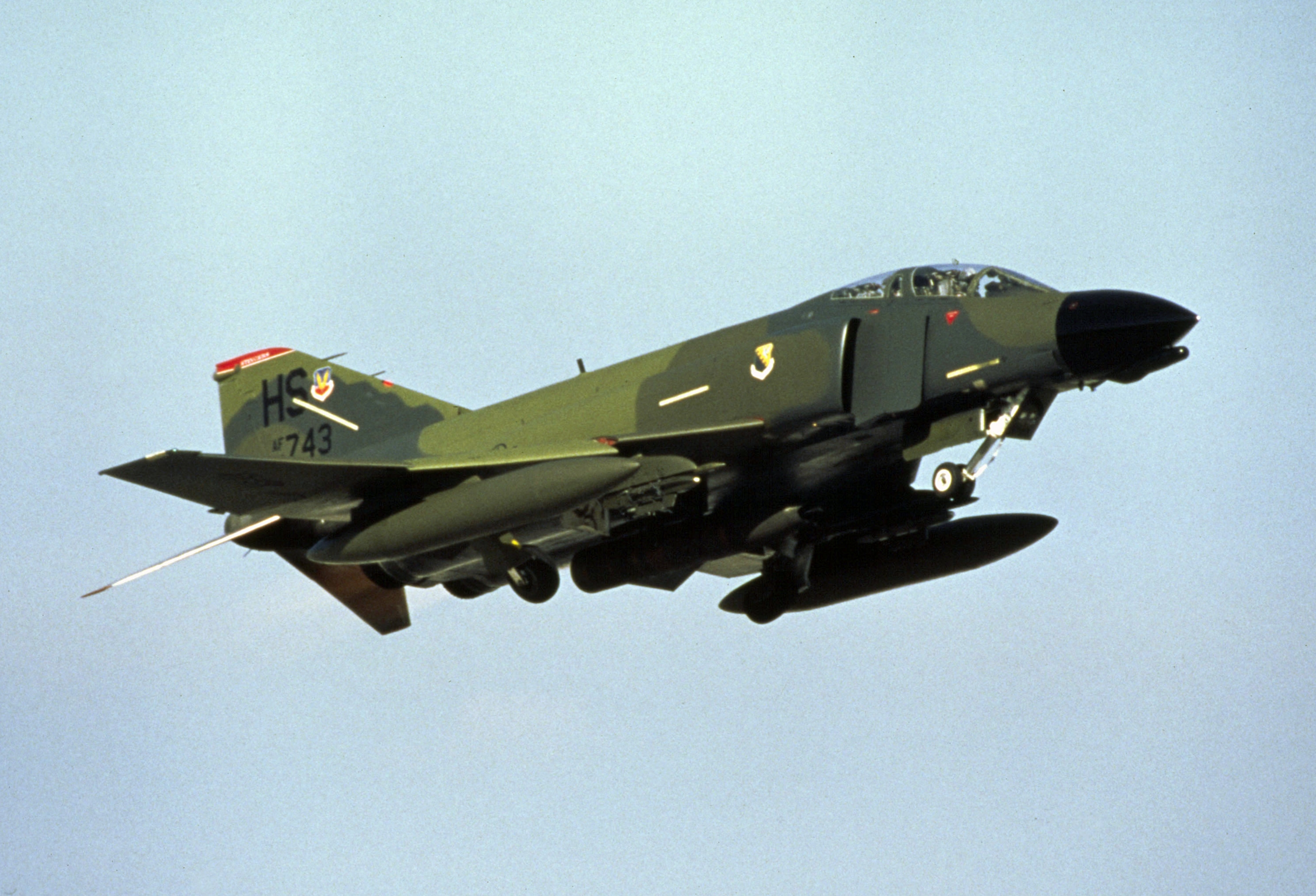
A 307th TFTS F-4D taking off

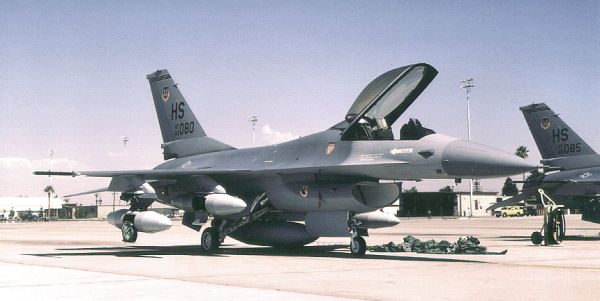
F-16A Block 15Q (s/n 83-1080) of the 308th FS, about 1988

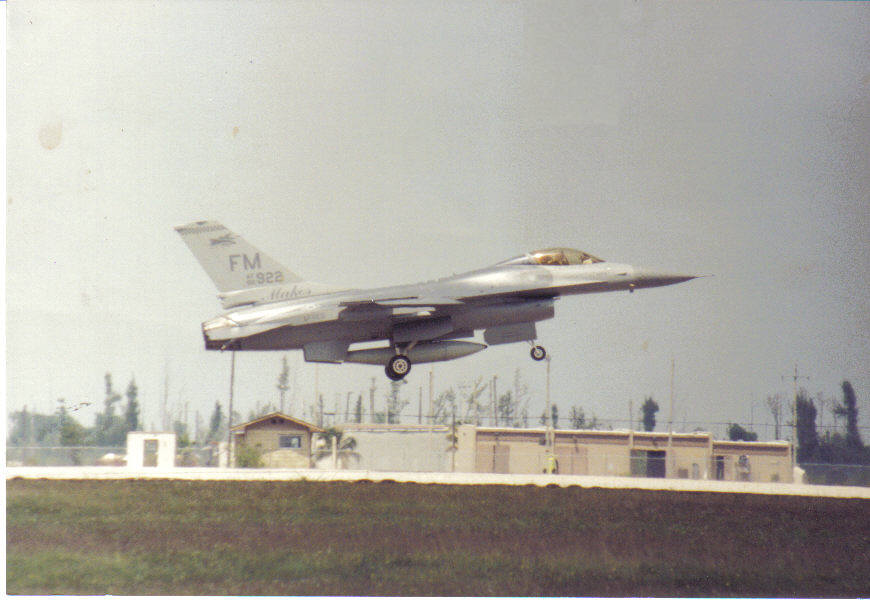
F-16 touch-and-go landing practice at Homestead ARB, c. 1996
