= 90th Troop Carrier Squadron =

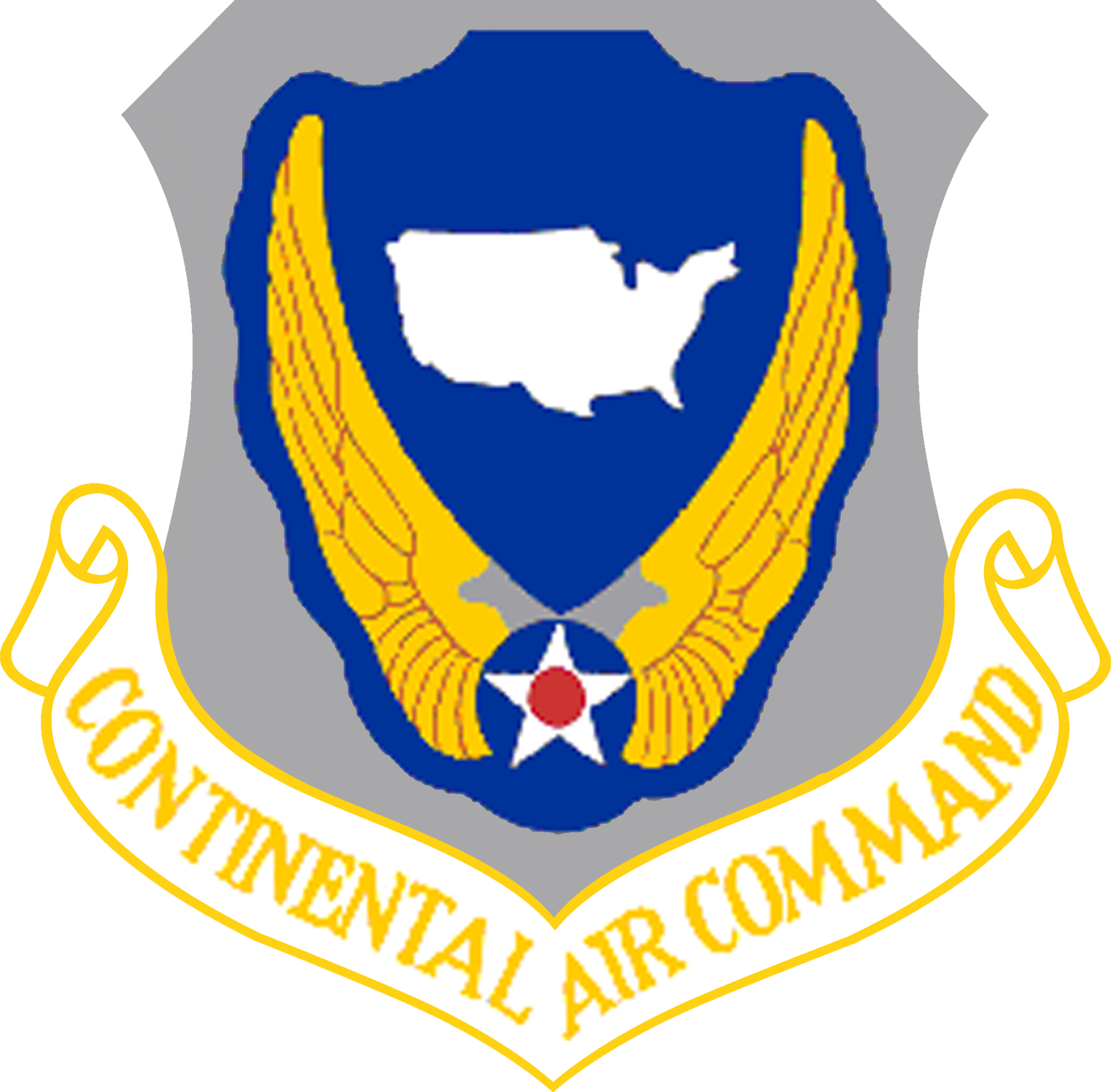
90th Troop Carrier Squadron

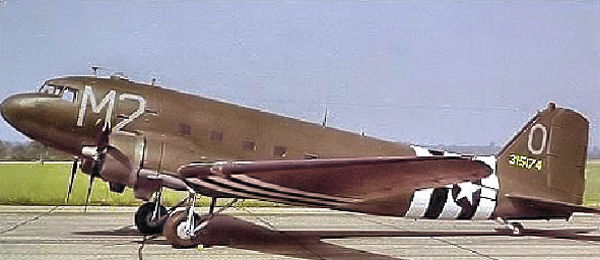
- C-47 of the 438th Troop Carrier Group at RAF Greenham Common
- Active: 1943-1945; 1949-1951
- Country: United States
- Branch: United States Air Force
- Role: Airlift
- Part of: Continental Air Command
- Engagements: European Theater of Operations
- Decorations: Presidential Unit Citation

Insignia
- World War II Fuselage Code: Q7

The 90th Troop Carrier Squadron (Medium) is an inactive United States Air Force unit. Its last assignment was with the 438th Troop Carrier Group, based at Offut Air Force Base, Nebraska. It was inactivated on 16 Nov 1957

The squadron was first activated in June 1943. After training in the United States, it served in the European Theater of Operations, earning a Distinguished Unit Citation for its action on D-Day during Operation Overlord. After VE Day. the unit returned to the United States, where it was inactivated.

The squadron was activated in the Air Force Reserve in June 1949. It trained in troop carrier operations at Offutt Air Force Base until March 1951, when it was called to active duty and its personnel used as fillers for other units.

== History ==
=== World War II ===
Activated in June 1943 under I Troop Carrier Command and equipped with C-47 Skytrains. Trained in various parts of the eastern United States until the end of 1943. Deployed to England and assigned to IX Troop Carrier Command, Ninth Air Force.

Prepared for the invasion of Nazi-occupied Europe. On 5 June 1944, the squadron took off for assigned drop zones in Occupied France, commencing at 23:48 hours. Despite radio black-out, overloaded aircraft, low cloud cover and lack of marked drop zones, they carried parachute infantry of the 101st Airborne Division's 502d Parachute Infantry Regiment, who were dropped soon after midnight in the area northwest of Carentan. Glider-borne reinforcement missions followed, carrying weapons, ammunition, rations, and other supplies

On 20 July departed for Canino airbase in Italy in preparation for the August invasion of Southern France, Operation Dragoon. In the invasion, dropped paratroops and towed gliders that carried reinforcements.

During Operation Market Garden in September 1944, the group released gliders carrying troops and equipment for the airborne attack in the occupied Netherlands. Re-supply missions were flown on 20 September and on the 21st to Overasselt and on the 21st to Son.

During the Battle of the Bulge (December 1944 – January 1945), flew air supply missions to battle areas, including the first two flights into beleaguered Bastogne, re-supplying the 101st Airborne Division

After moving to France in February 1945, flying combat operations from rough Resupply and Evacuation airfields carrying supplies and ammunition to front line forces, evacuating wounded personnel to rear-zone hospitals. The unit released gliders in support of an American crossing of the Rhine River called Operation Varsity in March 1945.

After V-E Day, the unit evacuated prisoners of war and displaced persons to relocation centers. Returned to the United States in August 1945, until demobilizing. Inactivated as an administrative unit in September 1945.

=== Air Force Reserve ===
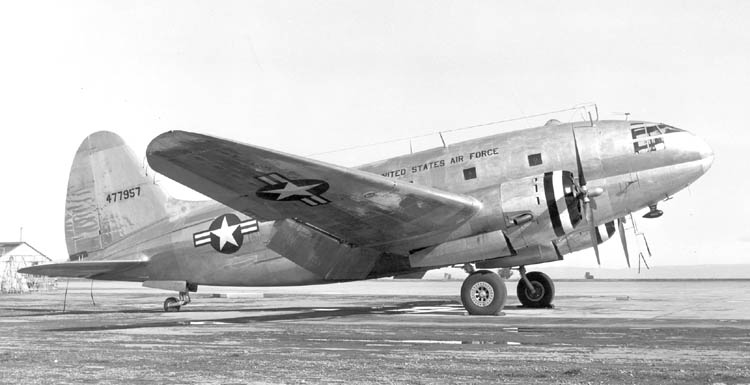
C-46D of the AF Reserve

In 1949 Continental Air Command reorganized its reserve units under the wing base organization, which placed support units under the same headquarters as the combat group they supported. As part of this reorganization, the 438th Troop Carrier Wing was activated at Offutt Air Force Base, Nebraska. The 90th Squadron was activated along with the wing. The squadron's manning, however, was limited to 25% of active duty organization authorizations. The squadron trained under the 2473d Air Force Reserve Training Center for troop carrier operations with the C-46, but also flew the North American T-6 Texan trainer.

All combat units of the Air Force Reserve were ordered to active service for the Korean War. The 90th was called up in the second wave of mobilizations on 10 March 1951. Its personnel were used to man other organizations, primarily those of Strategic Air Command, and it was inactivated on 14 March 1951. Its aircraft were distributed to other organizations as well.

=== Lineage ===
- Constituted as the 90th Troop Carrier Squadron on 14 May 1943

Activated on 1 June 1943
Inactivated on 22 September 1945

- Redesignated 90th Troop Carrier Squadron, Medium on 10 May 1949

Activated in the reserve on 27 June 1949
Ordered to active service on 10 March 1951
Inactivated on 14 March 1951

=== Assignments ===
- 438th Troop Carrier Group, 1 June 1943 – 22 September 1945
- 438th Troop Carrier Group, 27 June 1949 - 14 March 1951

=== Stations ===
- Baer Field, Indiana, 1 June 1943
- Sedalia Army Air Field, Missouri, 11 June 1943
- Laurinburg-Maxton Army Air Base, North Carolina, 30 October 1943
- Baer Field, Indiana, c. 15 - c. 28 January 1944
- RAF Langar (AAF-490), England, February 1944
- RAF Greenham Common (AAF-486), England, March 1944

Operated from Montalto Di Castro Airfield, Italy, 20 July - 23 August 1944

- Prosnes Airfield (A-79), France, February 1945
- Amiens Glisy Airfield (B-48), France, May - August 1945
- Camp Myles Standish, Massachusetts, 21–22 September 1945
- Offutt AFB, Nebraska, 27 June 1949 - 14 March 1951

=== Aircraft ===
- Douglas C-47 Skytrain, 1943-1945
- Curtiss C-46 Commando, 1945, 1949–1951

=== Awards and campaigns ===
| Award streamer | Award | Dates | Notes |
|---|---|---|---|
| | Distinguished Unit Citation | 5 June 1944-7 June 1944 | Normandy 87th Troop Carrier Squadron |

| Campaign Streamer | Campaign | Dates | Notes |
|---|---|---|---|
| | Normandy | 6 June 1944 – 24 July 1944 | 87th Troop Carrier Squadron |
| | Northern France | 25 July 1944 – 14 September 1944 | 87th Troop Carrier Squadron |
| | Rome-Arno | 20 July 1944 – 9 September 1944 | 87th Troop Carrier Squadron |
| | Southern France | 15 August 1944 – 14 September 1944 | 87th Troop Carrier Squadron |
| | Rhineland | 15 September 1944 – 21 March 1945 | 87th Troop Carrier Squadron |
| | Ardennes-Alsace | 16 December 1944 – 25 January 1945 | 87th Troop Carrier Squadron |
| | Central Europe | 22 March 1944 – 21 May 1945 | 87th Troop Carrier Squadron |
