= 89th Airlift Squadron =

89th Airlift Squadron

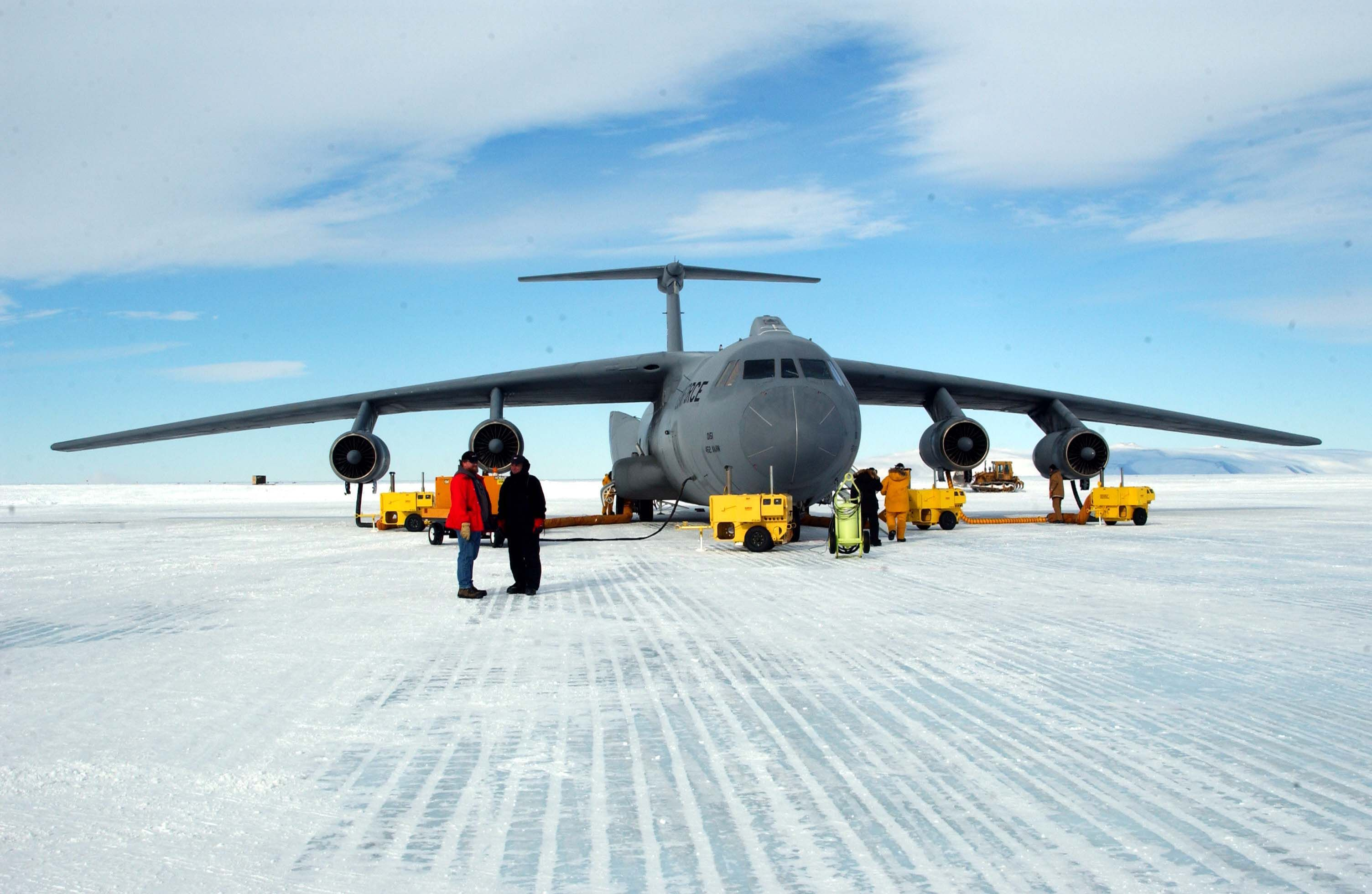
- A squadron C-141 Starlifter supporting Operation Deep Freeze
- Active: 1943–1945; 1949–1951; 1952–1957; 1982–present
- Country: United States
- Branch: United States Air Force
- Role: Airlift
- Part of: Air Force Reserve Command
- Garrison/HQ: Wright-Patterson Air Force Base
- Nickname(s): Rhinos
- Engagements: Operation Overlord; Operation Dragoon; Operation Market Garden; Battle of Bastogne
- Decorations: Distinguished Unit Citation; Air Force Outstanding Unit Award

Commanders
- Current commander: Lt Col Eric Florschuetz

Insignia
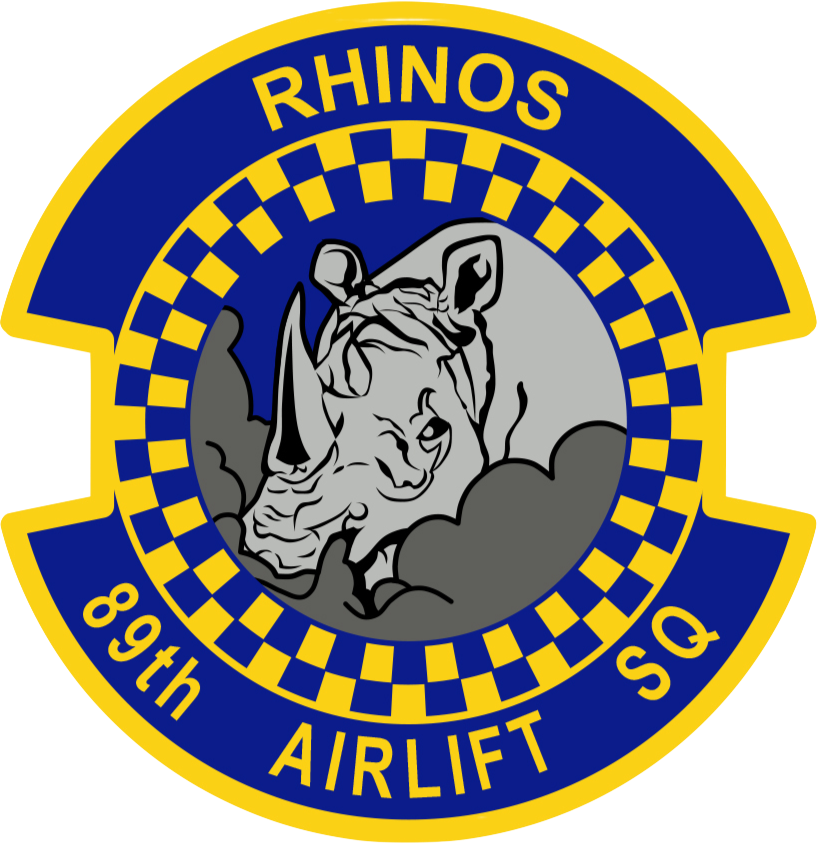
- 89th Airlift Squadron emblem (Approved 15 August 1985)
- World War II Fuselage Code: 4U

The 89th Airlift Squadron is a United States Air Force Reserve squadron, assigned to the 445th Operations Group, stationed at Wright-Patterson Air Force Base, Ohio.

The squadron was first activated in June 1943 as the 89th Troop Carrier Squadron. After training in the United States, it served in the European Theater of Operations, earning a Distinguished Unit Citation for its action on D-Day during Operation Overlord. After VE Day. the unit returned to the United States, where it was inactivated.

The squadron was activated in the Air Force Reserve in June 1949. It trained in troop carrier operations at Offutt Air Force Base until March 1951, when it was called to active duty and its personnel used as fillers for other units. It was activated again in the reserves as a fighter-bomber unit the following year and served until 1957, when reserve fighter units were replaced by troop carrier units. It was again activated in the reserve in 1972 as the 89th Tactical Fighter Squadron'. It returned to the airlift mission in 1994.

== Overview ==
It operates C-17 Globemaster III aircraft providing strategic, tactical and global airlift.

== History ==
=== World War II ===
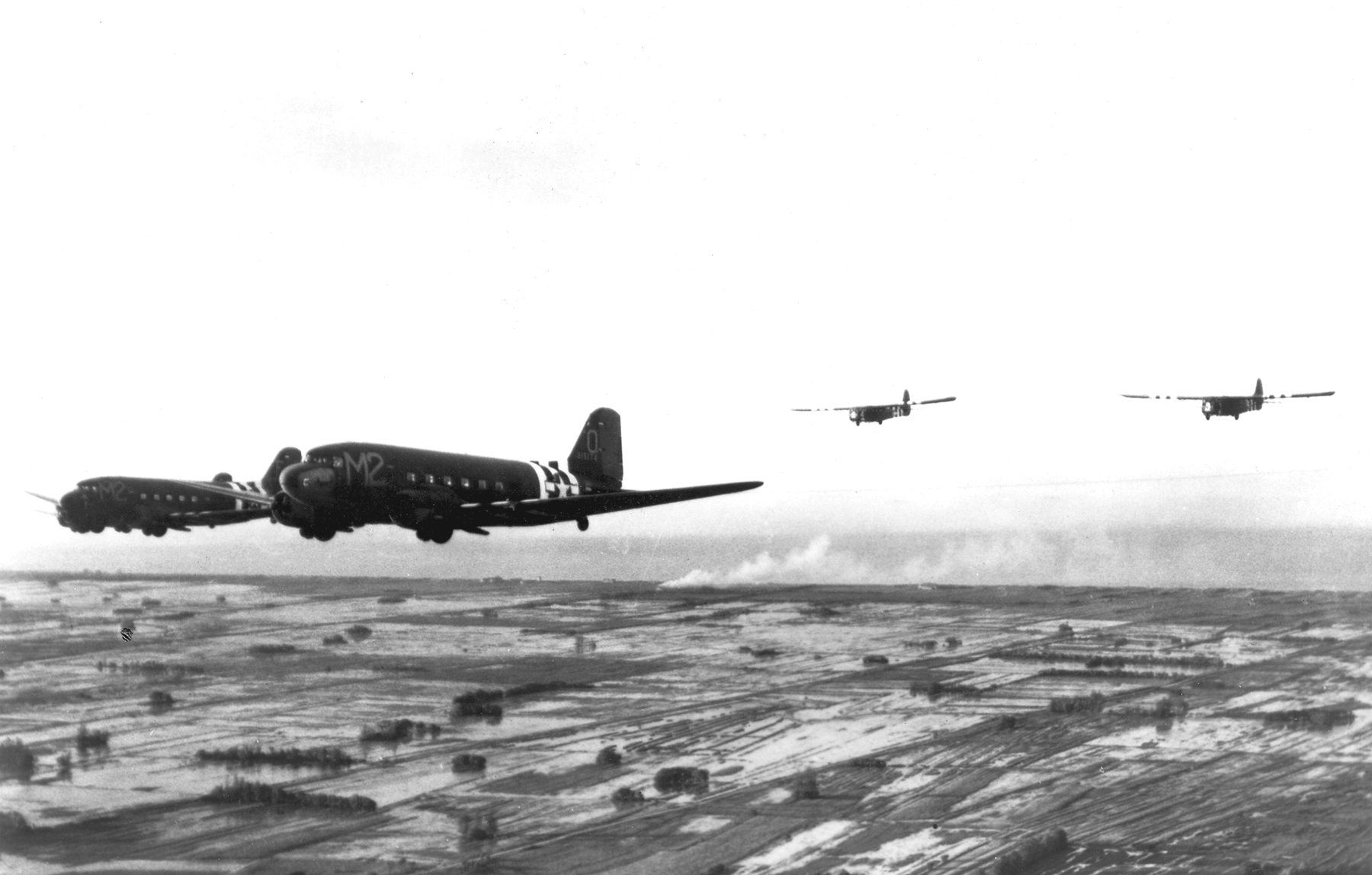
438th Troop Carrier Group C-47As tow gliders over Normandy in June 1944

The squadron was first activated as the 89th Troop Carrier Squadron in June 1943 by I Troop Carrier Command and equipped with Douglas C-47 Skytrains. It trained in various parts of the eastern United States until the end of 1943. The squadron deployed to England, where it became part of IX Troop Carrier Command.

The squadron prepared for Operation Overlord, the invasion of Nazi-occupied Europe. On 5 June 1944, the squadron took off for assigned drop zones in occupied France, commencing at 23:48 hours. Despite radio black-out, overloaded aircraft, low cloud cover and lack of marked drop zones, they carried parachute infantry of the 101st Airborne Division's 502d Parachute Infantry Regiment, who were dropped soon after midnight in the area northwest of Carentan. Glider-borne reinforcement missions followed, carrying weapons, ammunition, rations, and other supplies.

On 20 July 1944 the 89th departed for Italy in preparation for the August invasion of Southern France, Operation Dragoon. In that invasion, it dropped paratroops and towed gliders that carried reinforcements.

Returning to England, during Operation Market Garden in September 1944, the group released gliders carrying troops and equipment for the airborne attack in the occupied Netherlands. Resupply missions were flown on 20 September and on the 21st to Overasselt and on the 21st to Son.

During the Battle of the Bulge (December 1944 – January 1945), the squadron flew air supply missions to battle areas, including the first two flights into beleaguered Bastogne, resupplying the 101st Airborne Division.

After moving to France in February 1945, the squadron flew combat operations from rough resupply and evacuation airfields carrying supplies and ammunition to front line forces and evacuating wounded personnel to rear-zone hospitals. The unit released gliders in support of an American crossing of the Rhine River called Operation Varsity in March 1945.

After V-E Day, the unit evacuated prisoners of war and displaced persons to relocation centers. It returned to the United States in August 1945, where it was inactivated in September 1945.

=== Air Force Reserve ===
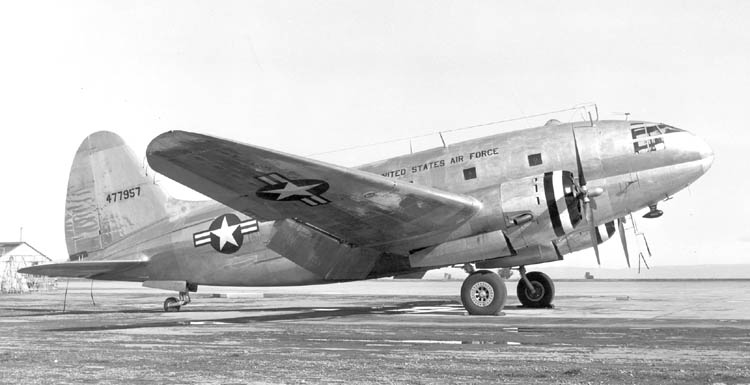
C-46D of the AF Reserve

In 1949 Continental Air Command reorganized its reserve units under the wing base organization, which placed support units under the same headquarters as the combat group they supported. As part of this reorganization, the 438th Troop Carrier Wing was activated at Offutt Air Force Base, Nebraska. The 89th Squadron was activated along with the wing. The squadron's manning, however, was limited to 25% of active duty organization authorizations. The squadron trained under the 2473d Air Force Reserve Training Center for troop carrier operations with the C-46, but also flew the North American T-6 Texan trainer.

All combat units of the Air Force Reserve were ordered to active service for the Korean War. The 89th was called up in the second wave of mobilizations on 10 March 1951. Its personnel were used to man other organizations, primarily those of Strategic Air Command, and it was inactivated on 14 March 1951. Its aircraft were distributed to other organizations as well.

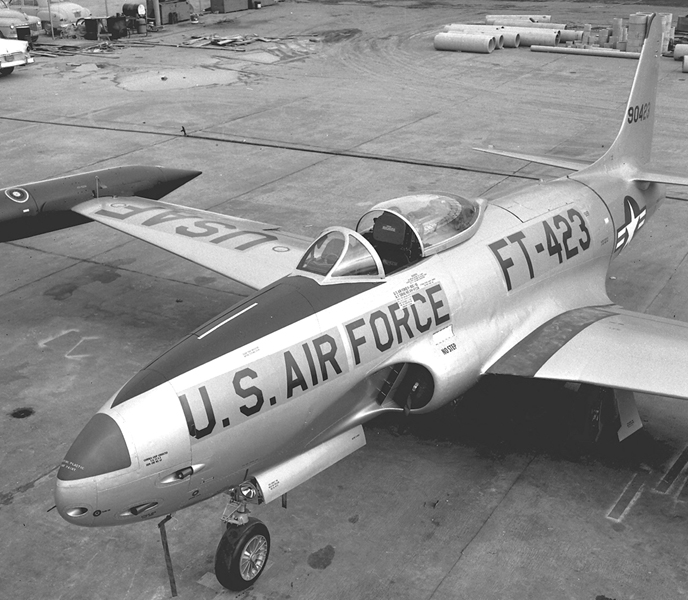
F-80 as flown by the group in the Reserves

Little more than a year later the squadron was redesignated the 89th Fighter-Bomber Squadron and activated at Billy Mitchell Field, Wisconsin when the 438th Fighter-Bomber Wing replaced the 924th Reserve Training Wing there. The reserve mobilization for the Korean war, however, had left the Reserve without airplanes, and the unit did not receive aircraft until July 1952. When it finally began to receive its planes, they were World War II era North American F-51 Mustangs, which would serve until the squadron's Lockheed F-80 Shooting Stars arrived. Once more, the 2473d Air Force Reserve Training Center was responsible for the training of the 438th Wing and other units at the station. Despite its designation as a fighter bomber unit, the squadron initially trained in the air defense role.

In 1957 the squadron began to upgrade to the North American F-86 Sabre. However, its time with this plane would be short. By 1956, the Joint Chiefs of Staff were pressuring the Air Force to provide more wartime airlift. At the same time, about 150 Fairchild C-119 Flying Boxcars became available from the active force. Consequently, in November 1956 the Air Force directed Continental Air Command to convert three fighter bomber wings to the troop carrier mission by September 1957. The squadron was inactivated 16 November 1957.

In 1982 the squadron was again activated as the 89th Tactical Fighter Squadron and trained on fighter operations until 1994.

Since 1994 the 89th has trained for and flown strategic airlift missions worldwide, taking part in contingency operations as needed. The wing was fully equipped with the C-17 in February 2012.

== Lineage ==
- Constituted as the 89th Troop Carrier Squadron on 14 May 1943

Activated on 1 June 1943
Inactivated on 22 September 1945

- Redesignated 89th Troop Carrier Squadron, Medium on 10 May 1949

Activated in the reserve on 27 June 1949
Ordered to active service on 10 March 1951
Inactivated on 14 March 1951

- Redesignated 89th Fighter-Bomber Squadron on 26 May 1952

Activated in the reserve on 15 June 1952
Inactivated on 16 November 1957.

- Redesignated 89th Tactical Fighter Squadron on 20 January 1982

Activated in the reserve on 1 July 1982

- Redesignated 89th Fighter Squadron on 1 February 1992
- Redesignated 89th Airlift Squadron on 1 October 1994

=== Assignments ===
- 438th Troop Carrier Group, 1 June 1943 – 22 September 1945
- 438th Troop Carrier Group, 27 June 1949 – 14 March 1951
- 438th Fighter-Bomber Group, 15 June 1952 – 16 November 1957
- 906th Tactical Fighter Group (later 906th Fighter Group), 1 July 1982
- 445th Operations Group, 1 October 1994 – present

=== Stations ===
- Baer Field, Indiana, 1 June 1943
- Sedalia Army Air Field, Missouri, 11 June 1943
- Laurinburg-Maxton Army Air Base, North Carolina, 30 October 1943
- Baer Field, Indiana, c. 15 January – c. 28 January 1944
- RAF Langar (AAF-490), England, February 1944
- RAF Greenham Common (AAF-486), England, Mar 1944

Operated from Montalto Di Castro Airfield, Italy, 20 July – 23 August 1944

- Prosnes Airfield (A-79), France, February 1945
- Amiens Glisy Airfield (B-48), France, May – Aug 1945
- Camp Myles Standish, Massachusetts, 21–22 September 1945
- Offutt Air Force Base, Nebraska, 27 June 1949 – 14 March 1951
- General Mitchell Field, Wisconsin, 15 June 1952 – 16 November 1957
- Wright-Patterson Air Force Base, Ohio, 1 July 1982 – present

=== Aircraft ===
- Douglas C-47 Skytrain (1943–1945, 1949–1951)
- Beechcraft C-45 Expeditor (1949–1951)
- Curtiss C-46 Commando (1949–1951)
- North American F-51 Mustang (1953–1954)
- Lockheed T-33 T-Bird (1954–1957)
- Lockheed F-80 Shooting Star (1955–1957)
- McDonnell F-4 Phantom II (1982–1989)
- General Dynamics F-16 Fighting Falcon (1989–1994)
- Lockheed C-141 Starlifter (1994–2006)
- Lockheed C-5 Galaxy (2005–2011)
- McDonnell Douglas C-17 Globemaster III (2011–present)

== See also ==
- List of United States Air Force airlift squadrons
- List of C-47 Skytrain operators
- List of F-4 Phantom II operators
- General Dynamics F-16 Fighting Falcon operators
