= 87th Fighter-Bomber Squadron =

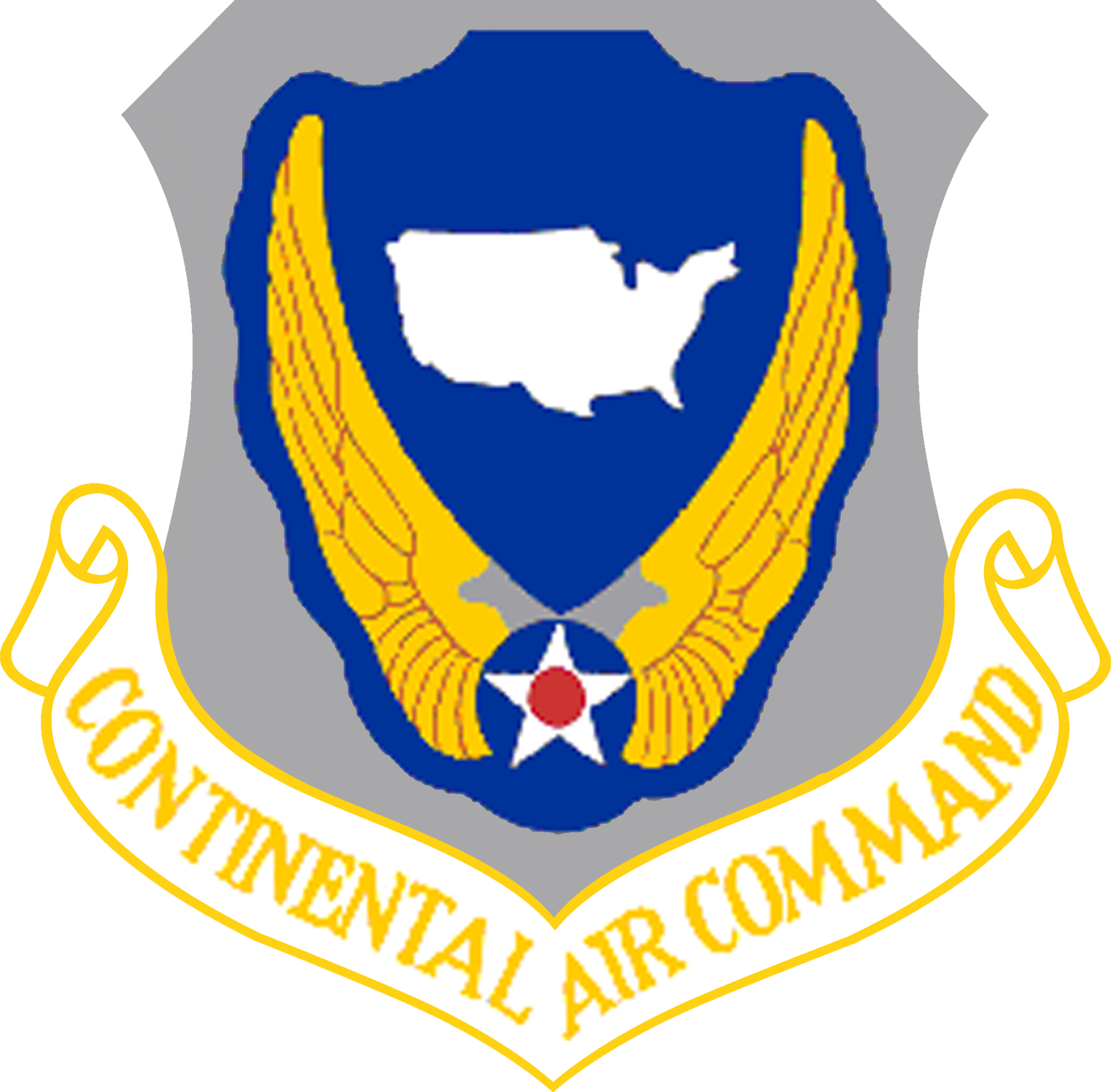
87th Fighter-Bomber Squadron

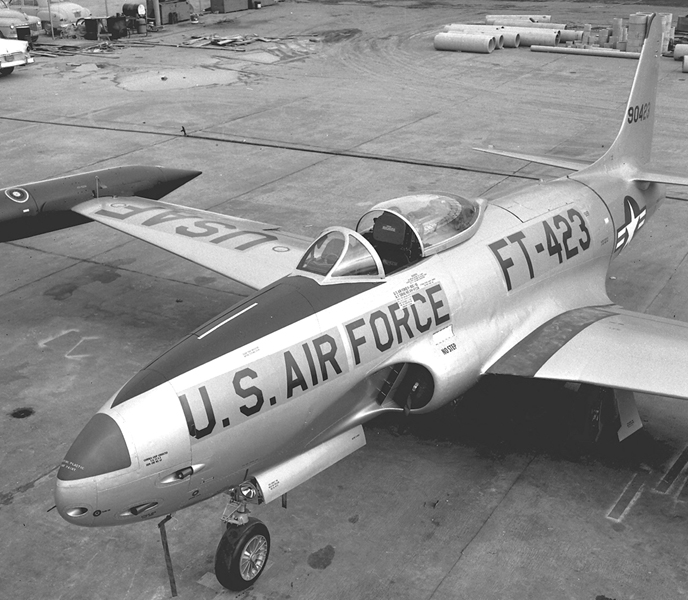
- F-80 as flown by the group in the Reserves
- Active: 1943–1945; 1949–1951; 1952–1957
- Country: United States
- Branch: United States Air Force
- Role: Fighter-Bomber
- Part of: Continental Air Command
- Engagements: European Theater of Operations
- Decorations: Presidential Unit Citation

Insignia
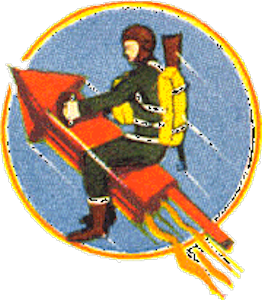
- 87th Fighter-Bomber Squadron emblem (Approved 3 April 1944)
- World War II Fuselage Code: 3X

The 87th Fighter-Bomber Squadron is an inactive United States Air Force unit. Its last assignment was with the 438th Fighter-Bomber Group, based at General Mitchell Field, Milwaukee, Wisconsin, where it was inactivated on 16 November 1957.

The squadron was first activated in June 1943 as the 87th Troop Carrier Squadron. After training in the United States, it served in the European Theater of Operations, earning a Distinguished Unit Citation for its action on D-Day during Operation Overlord. After VE Day. the unit returned to the United States, where it was inactivated.

The squadron was activated in the Air Force Reserve in June 1949. It trained in troop carrier operations at Offutt Air Force Base until March 1951, when it was called to active duty and its personnel used as fillers for other units. It was activated again in the reserves as a fighter-bomber unit the following year.

== History ==
=== World War II ===
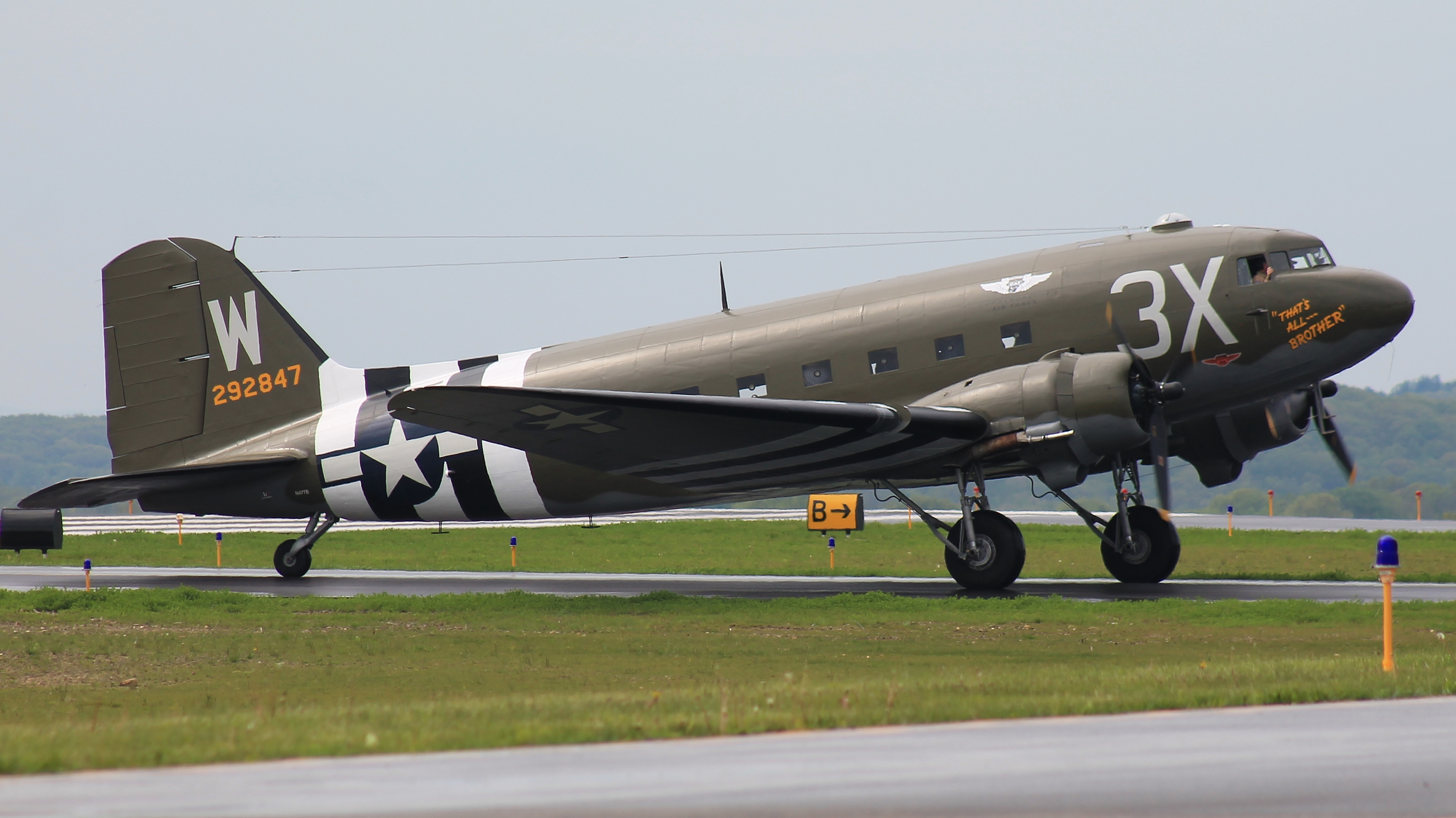
87th Troop Carrier Squadron's That's All, Brother, a preserved C-47 Skytrain that led the others during the airborne landings in Normandy on D-Day, 6 June 1944.

The 87th Troop Carrier Squadron was activated in June 1943 under 438th Troop Carrier Group, I Troop Carrier Command and equipped with C-47 Skytrains. It trained in various parts of the eastern United States until the end of 1943. Then it was deployed to England and assigned to IX Troop Carrier Command, Ninth Air Force.

There it prepared for the invasion of Nazi-occupied Europe. On 5 June 1944, the squadron took off for assigned drop zones in occupied France, commencing at 23:48 hours. Despite radio black-out, overloaded aircraft, low cloud cover and lack of marked drop zones, they carried parachute infantry of the 101st Airborne Division's 502d Parachute Infantry Regiment, who were dropped soon after midnight in the area northwest of Carentan. Glider-borne reinforcement missions followed, carrying weapons, ammunition, rations, and other supplies.

On 20 July the squadron departed for Canino airbase in Italy in preparation for the August invasion of Southern France, Operation Dragoon. In the invasion, it dropped paratroops and towed gliders that carried reinforcements.

During Operation Market Garden in September 1944, the squadron released gliders carrying troops and equipment for the airborne attack in the occupied Netherlands. Re-supply missions were flown on 20 September and on the 21st to Overasselt and on the 21st to Son.

During the Battle of the Bulge (December 1944 – January 1945), the squadron flew air supply missions to battle areas, including the first two flights into beleaguered Bastogne, re-supplying the 101st Airborne Division.

After moving to France in February 1945, it flew combat operations from rough Resupply and Evacuation airfields carrying supplies and ammunition to front line forces, evacuating wounded personnel to rear-zone hospitals. The unit released gliders in support of the American crossing of the Rhine River in Operation Varsity in March 1945.

After V-E Day, the unit evacuated prisoners of war and displaced persons to relocation centers. It returned to the United States in August 1945, until demobilizing. It was inactivated as an administrative unit in September 1945.

=== Air Force Reserve ===
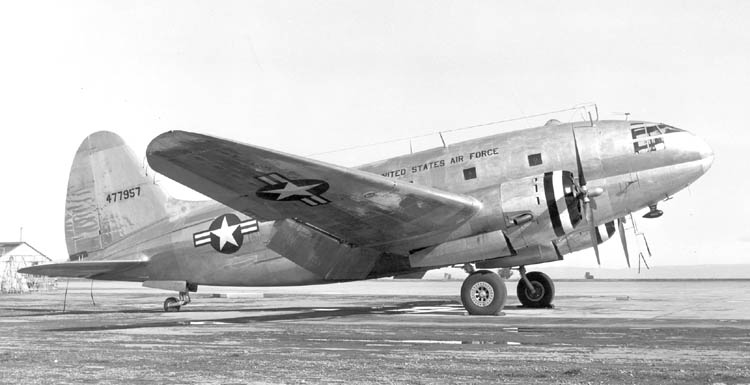
C-46D of the AF Reserve

In 1949 Continental Air Command reorganized its reserve units under the wing base organization, which placed support units under the same headquarters as the combat group they supported. As part of this reorganization, the 438th Troop Carrier Wing was activated at Offutt Air Force Base, Nebraska. The 87th Squadron was activated along with the wing. The squadron's manning, however, was limited to 25% of active duty organization authorizations. The squadron trained under the 2473d Air Force Reserve Training Center for troop carrier operations with the C-46, but also flew the North American T-6 Texan trainer.

All combat units of the Air Force Reserve were ordered to active service for the Korean War. The 87th was called up in the second wave of mobilizations on 10 March 1951. Its personnel were used to man other organizations, primarily those of Strategic Air Command, and it was inactivated on 14 March 1951. Its aircraft were distributed to other organizations as well.

Little more than a year later the squadron was redesignated the 87th Fighter-Bomber Squadron and activated at Billy Mitchell Field, Wisconsin when the 438th Fighter-Bomber Wing replaced the 924th Reserve Training Wing there. The reserve mobilization for the Korean war, however, had left the Reserve without airplanes, and the unit did not receive aircraft until July 1952. When it finally began to receive its planes, they were World War II era North American F-51 Mustangs, which would serve until the squadron's Lockheed F-80 Shooting Stars arrived. Once more, the 2473d Air Force Reserve Training Center was responsible for the training of the 438th Wing and other units at the station. Despite its designation as a fighter bomber unit, the squadron initially trained in the air defense role.

In 1957 the squadron began to upgrade to the North American F-86 Sabre. However, its time with this plane would be short. By 1956, the Joint Chiefs of Staff were pressuring the Air Force to provide more wartime airlift. At the same time, about 150 Fairchild C-119 Flying Boxcars became available from the active force. Consequently, in November 1956 the Air Force directed Continental Air Command to convert three fighter bomber wings to the troop carrier mission by September 1957. The squadron was inactivated 16 November 1957.

== Lineage ==
- Constituted as the 87th Troop Carrier Squadron on 14 May 1943

Activated on 1 June 1943
Inactivated on 22 September 1945

- Re-designated 87th Troop Carrier Squadron, Medium on 10 May 1949

Activated in the reserve on 27 June 1949
Ordered to active service on 10 March 1951
Inactivated on 14 March 1951

- Re-designated 87th Fighter-Bomber Squadron on 26 May 1952

Activated in the reserve on 15 June 1952
Inactivated on 16 November 1957

=== Assignments ===
- 438th Troop Carrier Group, 1 June 1943 – 22 September 1945
- 438th Troop Carrier Group, 27 June 1949 – 14 March 1951
- 438th Fighter-Bomber Group, 15 June 1952 – 16 November 1957

=== Stations ===
- Baer Field, Indiana, 1 June 1943
- Sedalia Army Air Field, Missouri, 11 June 1943
- Laurinburg-Maxton Army Air Base, North Carolina, 30 October 1943
- Baer Field, Indiana, c. 15-c. 28 January 1944
- RAF Langar (AAF-490), England, February 1944
- RAF Greenham Common (AAF-486), England, March 1944

Operated from Montalto Di Castro Airfield, Italy, 20 July – 23 August 1944

- Prosnes Airfield (A-79), France, February 1945
- Amiens Glisy Airfield (B-48) France, May – August 1945
- Camp Myles Standish, Massachusetts, 21–22 September 1945
- Offutt Air Force Base, Nebraska, 27 June 1949 – 14 March 1951
- General Mitchell Field, Wisconsin, 15 June 1952 – 16 November 1957

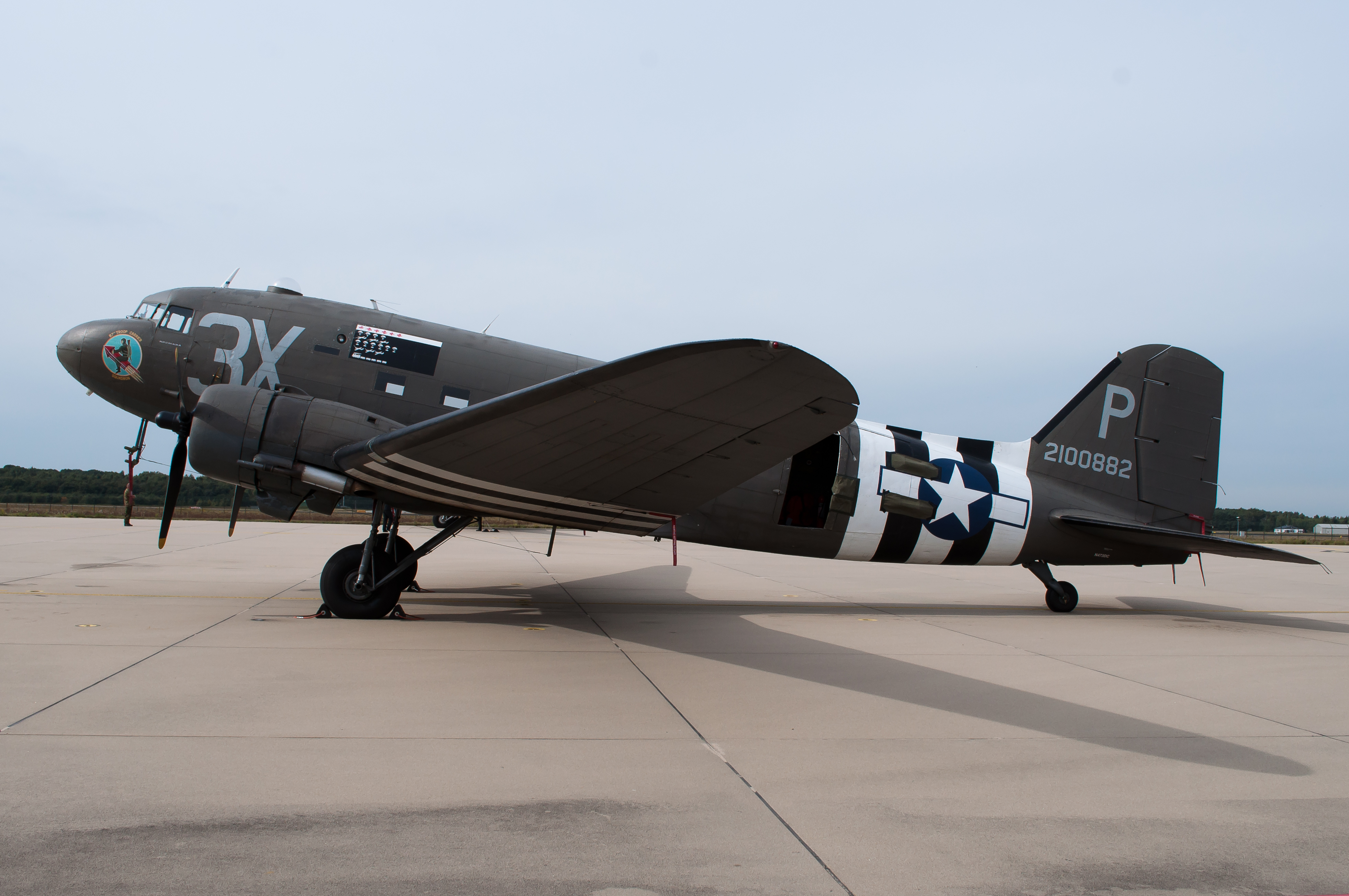
The preserved C-47 Skytrain Drag 'em Oot with 87th Troop Carrier Squadron markings, participating in the 2012 Operation Market Garden memorial.

=== Aircraft ===
- Douglas C-47 Skytrain, 1943–1945
- Curtiss C-46 Commando, 1945, 1949–1951
- North American F-51 Mustang, 1953–1954
- Lockheed F-80 Shooting Star, 1954–1957
- North American F-86 Sabre, 1957

=== Awards and campaigns ===
Award streamer	Award	Dates	Notes
	Distinguished Unit Citation	5 June 1944-7 June 1944	Normandy 87th Troop Carrier Squadron

Campaign Streamer	Campaign	Dates	Notes
	Normandy	6 June 1944 – 24 July 1944	87th Troop Carrier Squadron
	Northern France	25 July 1944 – 14 September 1944	87th Troop Carrier Squadron
	Rome-Arno	20 July 1944 – 9 September 1944	87th Troop Carrier Squadron
	Southern France	15 August 1944 – 14 September 1944	87th Troop Carrier Squadron
	Rhineland	15 September 1944 – 21 March 1945	87th Troop Carrier Squadron
	Ardennes-Alsace	16 December 1944 – 25 January 1945	87th Troop Carrier Squadron
	Central Europe	22 March 1944 – 21 May 1945	87th Troop Carrier Squadron
