= 88th Fighter-Bomber Squadron =

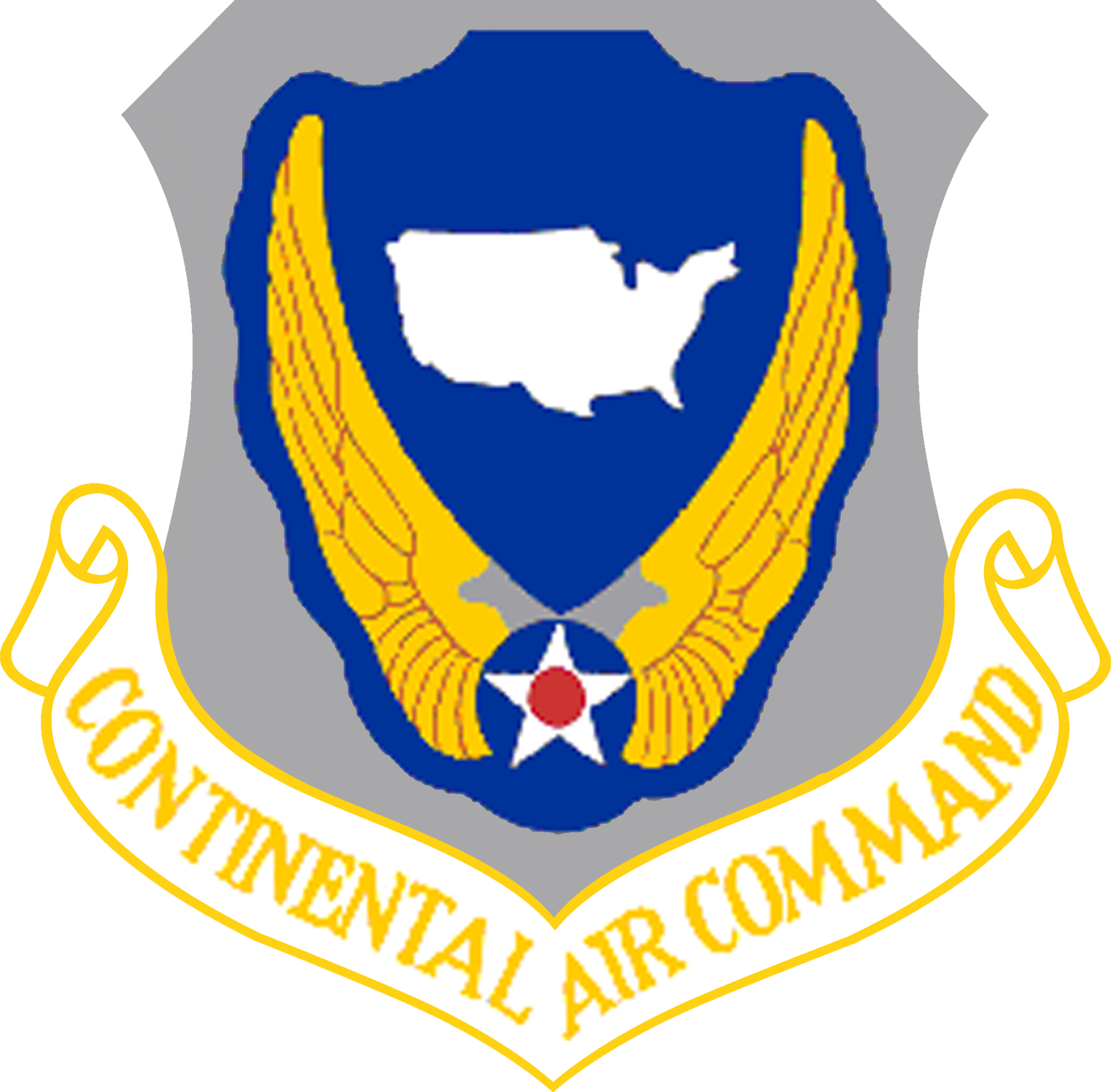
88th Fighter-Bomber Squadron

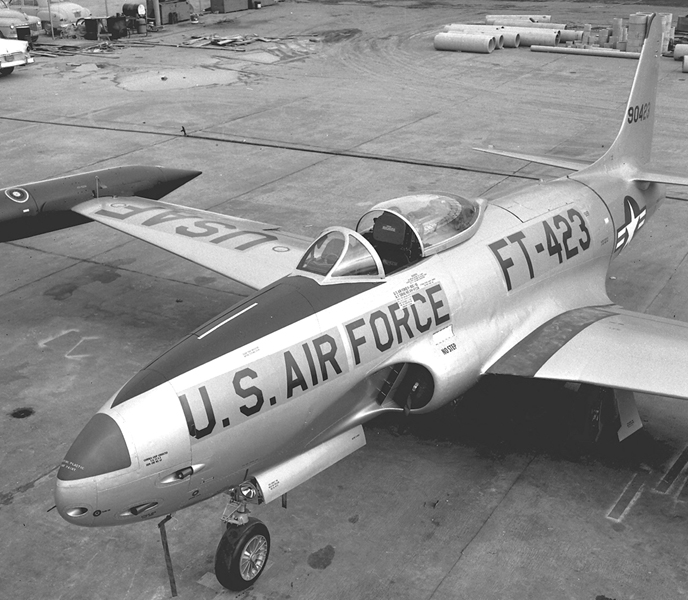
- F-80 as flown by the group in the Reserves
- Active: 1943–1945; 1949–1951; 1952–1957
- Country: United States
- Branch: United States Air Force
- Role: Fighter-Bomber
- Part of: Continental Air Command
- Engagements: European Theater of Operations
- Decorations: Presidential Unit Citation

Insignia
- World War II Fuselage Identification Code: M2

The 88th Fighter-Bomber Squadron is an inactive United States Air Force unit. Its last assignment was with the 438th Fighter-Bomber Group, based at General Mitchell Field, Milwaukee, Wisconsin. It was inactivated on 16 November 1957.

== History ==
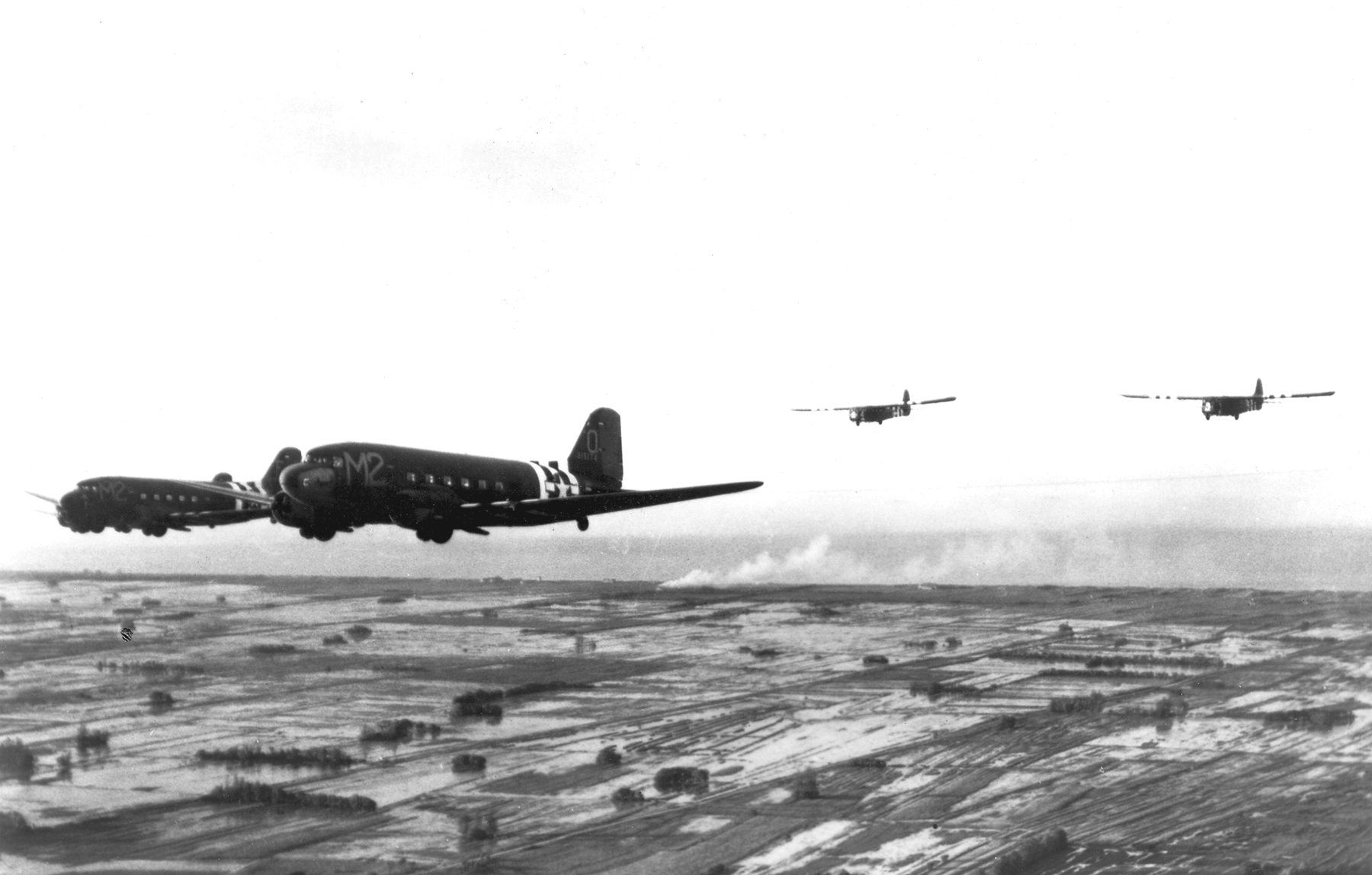
Squadron C-47As tow gliders over Normandy in June 1944

Activated in June 1943 under I Troop Carrier Command and equipped with C-47 Skytrains. Trained in various parts of the eastern United States until the end of 1943. Deployed to England and assigned to IX Troop Carrier Command, Ninth Air Force.

Prepared for the invasion of Nazi-occupied Europe. On 5 June 1944, the squadron took off for assigned drop zones in occupied France, commencing at 23:48 hours. Despite radio black-out, overloaded aircraft, low cloud cover and lack of marked drop zones, they carried parachute infantry of the 101st Airborne Division's 502d Parachute Infantry Regiment, who were dropped soon after midnight in the area northwest of Carentan. Glider-borne reinforcement missions followed, carrying weapons, ammunition, rations, and other supplies.

On 20 July departed for Canino airbase in Italy in preparation for the August invasion of Southern France, Operation Dragoon. In the invasion, dropped paratroops and towed gliders that carried reinforcements.

During Operation Market Garden in September 1944, the group released gliders carrying troops and equipment for the airborne attack in the occupied Netherlands. Re-supply missions were flown on 20 September and on the 21st to Overasselt and on the 21st to Son.

During the Battle of the Bulge (December 1944 – January 1945), flew air supply missions to battle areas, including the first two flights into beleaguered Bastogne, re-supplying the 101st Airborne Division.

After moving to France in February 1945, flying combat operations from rough Resupply and Evacuation airfields carrying supplies and ammunition to front line forces, evacuating wounded personnel to rear-zone hospitals. The unit released gliders in support of an American crossing of the Rhine River called Operation Varsity in March 1945.

After V-E Day, the unit evacuated prisoners of war and displaced persons to relocation centers. Returned to the United States in August 1945, until demobilizing. Inactivated as an administrative unit in September 1945.

=== Air Force Reserve ===
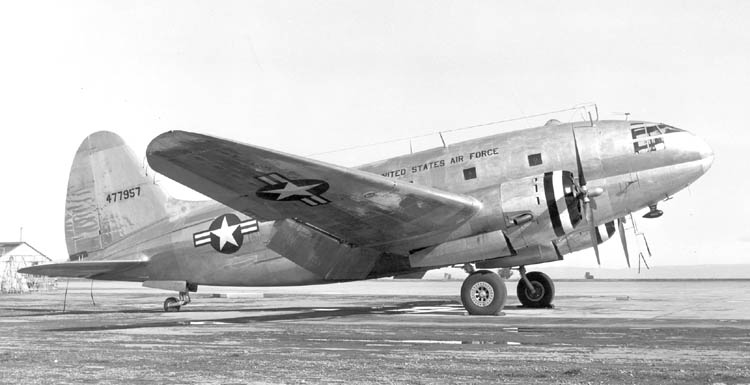
C-46D of the AF Reserve

In 1949 Continental Air Command reorganized its reserve units under the wing base organization, which placed support units under the same headquarters as the combat group they supported. As part of this reorganization, the 438th Troop Carrier Wing was activated at Offutt Air Force Base, Nebraska. The 88th Squadron was activated along with the wing. The squadron's manning, however, was limited to 25% of active duty organization authorizations. The squadron trained under the 2473d Air Force Reserve Training Center for troop carrier operations with the C-46, but also flew the North American T-6 Texan trainer.

All combat units of the Air Force Reserve were ordered to active service for the Korean War. The 88th was called up in the second wave of mobilizations on 10 March 1951. Its personnel were used to man other organizations, primarily those of Strategic Air Command, and it was inactivated on 14 March 1951. Its aircraft were distributed to other organizations as well.

Little more than a year later the squadron was redesignated the 88th Fighter-Bomber Squadron and activated at Billy Mitchell Field, Wisconsin when the 438th Fighter-Bomber Wing replaced the 924th Reserve Training Wing there. The reserve mobilization for the Korean war, however, had left the Reserve without airplanes, and the unit did not receive aircraft until July 1952. When it finally began to receive its planes, they were World War II era North American F-51 Mustangs, which would serve until the squadron's Lockheed F-80 Shooting Stars arrived. Once more, the 2473d Air Force Reserve Training Center was responsible for the training of the 438th Wing and other units at the station. Despite its designation as a fighter bomber unit, the squadron initially trained in the air defense role.

In 1957 the squadron began to upgrade to the North American F-86 Sabre. However, its time with this plane would be short. By 1956, the Joint Chiefs of Staff were pressuring the Air Force to provide more wartime airlift. At the same time, about 150 Fairchild C-119 Flying Boxcars became available from the active force. Consequently, in November 1956 the Air Force directed Continental Air Command to convert three fighter bomber wings to the troop carrier mission by September 1957. The squadron was inactivated 16 November 1957.

=== Operations and decorations ===
- Combat Operations: Airborne assaults on Normandy, Southern France, the Netherlands, and Germany; relief of Bastogne; transportation of cargo and personnel in ETO and MTO during World War II.
- Campaigns: Rome-Arno; Normandy; Northern France; Southern France; Rhineland; Ardennes-Alsace; Central Europe.
- Decorations: Distinguished Unit Citation: France, [6–7] Jun 1944.

=== Lineage ===
- Constituted as the 88th Troop Carrier Squadron on 14 May 1943

Activated on 1 June 1943
Inactivated on 22 September 1945

- Redesignated 88th Troop Carrier Squadron, Medium on 10 May 1949

Activated in the reserve on 27 June 1949
Ordered to active service on 10 March 1951
Inactivated on 14 March 1951

- Redesignated 88th Fighter-Bomber Squadron on 26 May 1952

Activated in the reserve on 15 June 1952
Inactivated on 16 November 1957

=== Assignments ===
- 438th Troop Carrier Group, 1 June 1943 – 22 September 1945
- 438th Troop Carrier Group, 27 June 1949 – 14 March 1951
- 438th Fighter-Bomber Group, 15 June 1952 – 16 November 1957

=== Stations ===
- Baer Field, Indiana, 1 June 1943
- Sedalia Army Air Field, Missouri, 11 June 1943
- Laurinburg-Maxton Army Air Base, North Carolina, 30 October 1943
- Baer Field, Indiana, c. 15-c. 28 January 1944
- RAF Langar (AAF-490), England, February 1944
- RAF Greenham Common (AAF-486), England, March 1944

Operated from Montalto Di Castro Airfield, Italy, 20 July – 23 August 1944

- Prosnes Airfield (A-79), France, February 1945
- Amiens Glisy Airfield (B-48), France, May – August 1945
- Camp Myles Standish, Massachusetts, 21–22 September 1945
- Offutt AFB, Nebraska, 27 June 1949 – 14 March 1951
- General Mitchell Field, Wisconsin, 15 June 1952 – 16 November 1957

=== Aircraft ===
- C-47 Skytrain, 1943–1945
- Curtiss C-46 Commando, 1949–1951
- North American F-51 Mustang, 1953–1954
- Lockheed F-80 Shooting Star, 1954–1957
- North American F-86 Sabre, 1957
