= 88 Squadron =

88 squadron or 88th Squadron may refer to:

- No. 88 Squadron RAAF, Australia
- No. 88 Squadron PAF, Pakistan
- No. 88 Squadron RSAF, Saudi Arabia
- No. 88 Squadron RAF, United Kingdom
- 88th Aero Squadron, Air Service, United States Army
- 88th Fighter-Bomber Squadron, United States Air Force
- 88th Fighter Training Squadron, United States Air Force
- 88th Observation Squadron, Air Service, United States Army
- 88th Reconnaissance Squadron, United States Army Air Corps

== See also ==
- Squadron 88
