= 438th Air Expeditionary Group =

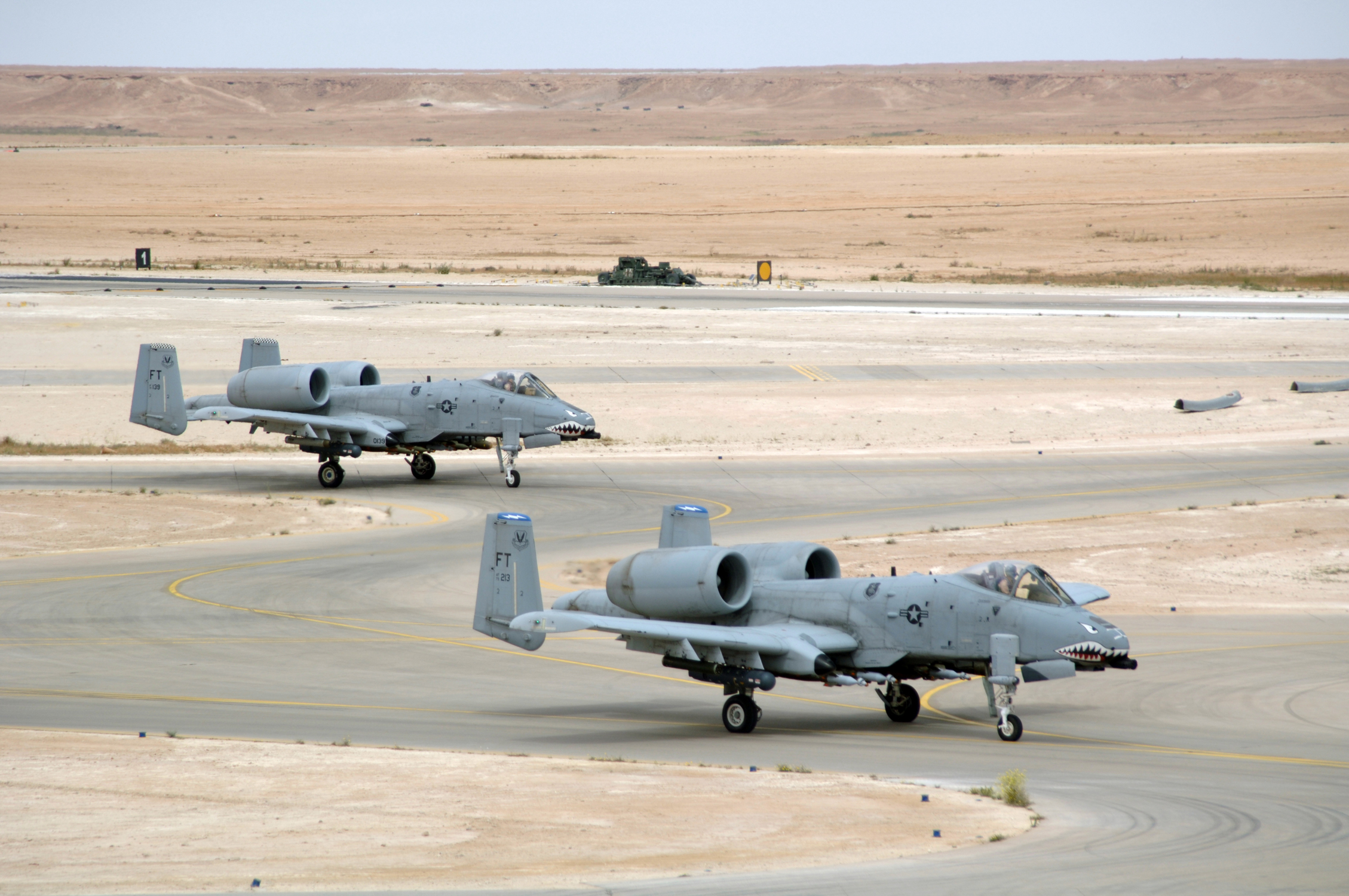
- A-10 Thunderbolt IIs from the 438th Air Expeditionary Group taxi out for a close air support mission
- Active: 1943–1945; 1949–1951; 1952–1957; 1991–1994; 2007
- Country: United States
- Branch: United States Air Force
- Role: Expeditionary operations
- Part of: United States Air Forces Central
- Motto: Nunquam Non Paratus Latin Never Unprepared
- Decorations: Distinguished Unit Citation

Insignia
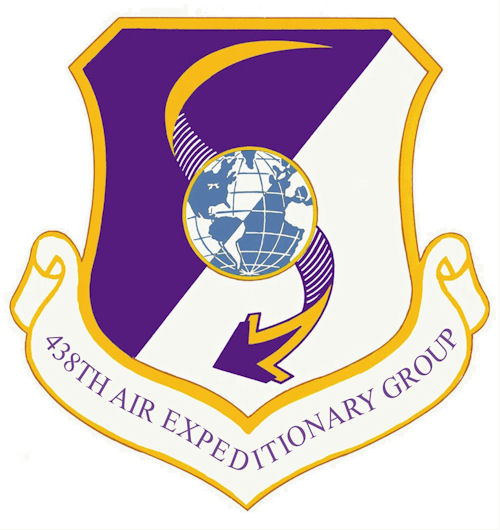
- 438th Air Expeditionary Group emblem (Approved 10 August 1954)

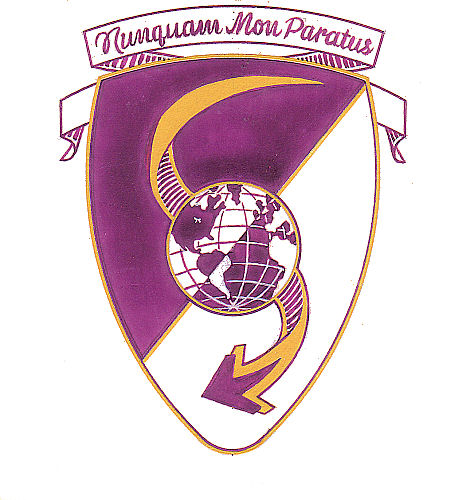
- Group emblem as originally designed

The United States Air Force's 438th Air Expeditionary Advisory Group is a provisional unit assigned to United States Air Forces Central to activate or inactivate as needed. It was last active in Al Anbar province, Iraq to provide close-air support to coalition forces in the region with Fairchild Republic A-10 Thunderbolt II aircraft. It was composed of deployed aircraft, equipment and personnel from Air Force units around the world.

The unit was first activated during World War II as the 438th Troop Carrier Group, a Douglas C-47 Skytrain unit. It saw combat in the European Theater of Operations as part of IX Troop Carrier Command. The group earned a Distinguished Unit Citation for its actions on D-Day during Operation Overlord. After VE Day, the group returned to the United States and was inactivated in December 1945.

The group was again activated in the Air Force Reserves in 1949. It was called to active duty for the Korean War, but its personnel were used as fillers for other units and the group was inactivated. During the mid 1950s, the group was again active in the Reserve as the 438th Fighter-Bomber Group. It remained inactive until 1991, when it became the 438th Operations Group at McGuire Air Force Base, New Jersey when the 438th Airlift Wing was reorganized under the Objective Wing model. It was inactivated with the wing in 1994.

== History ==
=== World War II ===
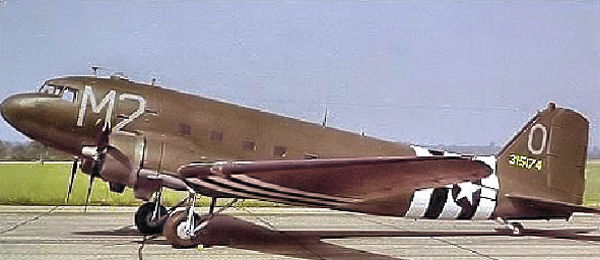
C-47 of the 438th Troop Carrier Group – RAF Greenham Common, England – World War II

==== Training in the United States ====
The group was first activated at Baer Field, Indiana in June 1943 as the 438th Troop Carrier Group, with the 87th, 88th, 89th and 90th Troop Carrier Squadrons assigned. Two weeks later it moved to Sedalia Army Air Field, Missouri, to begin training, primarily with Douglas C-47 Skytrains, but also with other military models of the DC-3. After processing through Baer Field, the group departed for England in January 1944.

==== Combat in the ETO ====
The group arrived at RAF Langar, England in February 1944 and assigned to the 53d Troop Carrier Wing After a month the group was moved south to a new station at RAF Greenham Common. Until June, the 438th TCG trained for and participated in airborne operations, flew resupply and reinforcement missions to combat zones, evacuated casualties, and hauled freight.

The 438th was selected to be the first group of IX Troop Carrier Command's force, following the pathfinder group in the American airborne landings in Normandy. Prior to the launch, both General Dwight D. Eisenhower and Lt Gen Lewis H. Brereton, Ninth Air Force Commanding General, visited Greenham Common to watch preparations and speak with the troops of the 502d Parachute Infantry Regiment. The planned route to the drop zone avoided friendly antiaircraft positions and allied convoys and was flown at 500 feet over the English Channel to elude German radar, with a climb to 1500 feet once landfall was made to avoid groundfire.

Eighty-one aircraft, divided into two serials of 36 and 45 aircraft and led by the 87th Troop Carrier Squadron took off commencing at 23:48 hours on 5 June. Despite radio black-out, overloaded aircraft, low cloud cover and lack of marked drop zones, they carried 1,430 men of the 502d Parachute Infantry Regiment, who were dropped soon after midnight in the area northwest of Carentan. Glider-borne reinforcement missions followed, and for its determined and successful work the group received a Distinguished Unit Citation. Losses amounted to one C-47 and a C-53, both lost to flak on 7 June.

On 20 July the air echelons of the 87th, 88th and 89th Troop Carrier Squadrons departed for Canino airbase in Italy in preparation for Operation Dragoon, the invasion of Southern France. In the invasion, the squadrons dropped paratroops and towed gliders that carried reinforcements. The group also hauled freight in Italy. The 90th TCS stayed in the UK and operated from RAF Welford until the rest of the groups aircraft returned from Italy on 24 August.

In September the 438th Group helped to supply the Third Army in its push across France, and transported troops and supplies when the Allies launched Operation Market-Garden, the airborne operation in the Netherlands. As part of Operation Market Garden, 90 aircraft from the 438th dropped 101st Airborne paratroopers near Eindhoven without loss on 17 September. The next day, 80 aircraft towed gliders again without loss of aircraft, although two gliders aborted and 11 C-47s suffered flak damage. However, when 40 C-47s towing 40 CG-4A Horsa Gliders left Greenham Common on 19 September, things did not go so well in adverse weather. Only half of the gliders were released in the landing zone area, and one C-47 was shot down and several gliders were lost. A further glider mission by a similar number of aircraft fared no better and another C-47 was lost. Re-supply missions were flown on 20 September and on the 21st to Overasselt and on the 21st to Son.

During the Battle of the Bulge (December 1944 – January 1945), the group, again headed by the 87th Troop Carrier Squadron, flew air supply missions to battle areas, including the first two flights into beleaguered Bastogne. In February 1945 the groups of the 53d TCW were moved to France, the 438th going to A-79 Advanced Landing Ground at Pronses.

The group evacuated Allied prisoners of war after V-E Day. It returned to Baer Field in September 1945 and was inactivated at Lawson Field, Georgia in November.

=== Air Force Reserve ===
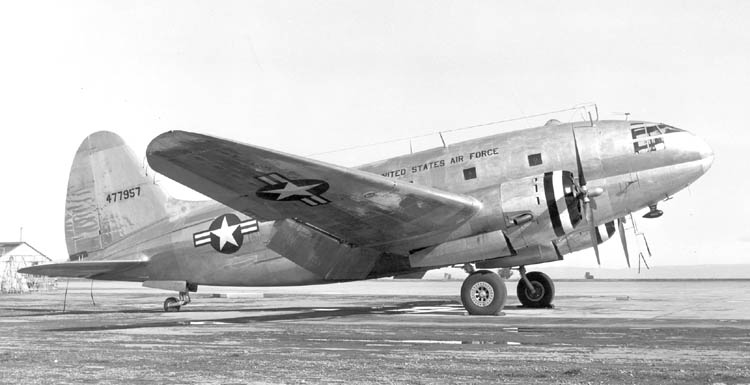
C-46D of the AF Reserve

In 1949 Continental Air Command reorganized its reserve units under the wing base organization, which placed support units under the same headquarters as the combat group they supported. As part of this reorganization, the 438th Troop Carrier Wing was activated at Offutt Air Force Base, Nebraska. The 438th Group was activated along with the wing, absorbing the resources of the 381st Bombardment Group, which was simultaneously inactivated. Although the group's manning, along with that of its component squadrons was limited to 25% of active duty organization authorizations, it was assigned four squadrons, rather than three. The group trained under the 2473d Air Force Reserve Training Center for troop carrier operations with the C-46, but also flew the North American T-6 Texan trainer.

All combat units of the Air Force Reserve were ordered to active service for the Korean War. The 438th was called up in the second wave of mobilizations on 10 March 1951. Its personnel were used to man other organizations, primarily those of Strategic Air Command, and it was inactivated on 14 March 1951. Its aircraft were distributed to other organizations as well.

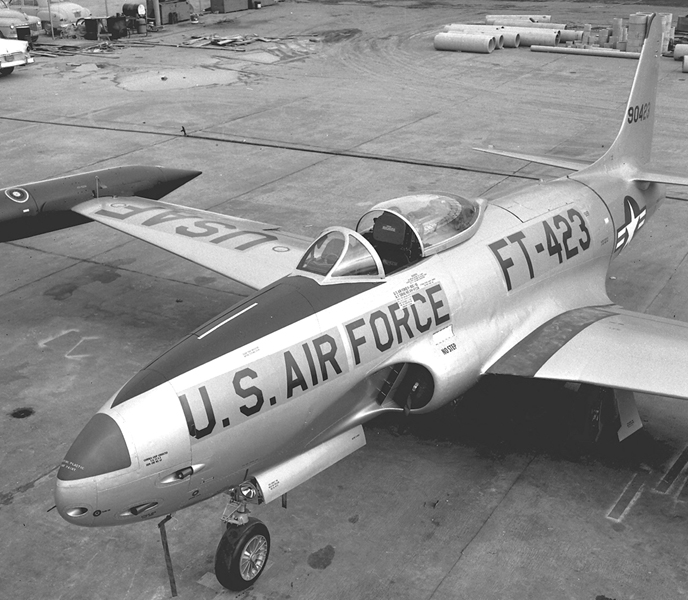
F-80 as flown by the group

Little more than a year later the group was redesignated the 438th Fighter-Bomber Group and activated at Billy Mitchell Field, Wisconsin when the 438th Fighter-Bomber Wing replaced the 924th Reserve Training Wing there. The reserve mobilization for the Korean war, however, had left the Reserve without airplanes, and the unit did not receive aircraft until July 1952. When it finally began to receive its planes, they were World War II era North American F-51 Mustangs, which would serve until the group's Lockheed F-80 Shooting Stars arrived. Once more, the 2473d Air Force Reserve Training Center was responsible for the training of the 438th Wing and other units at the station. Despite its designation as a fighter bomber unit, the group initially trained in the air defense role.

In 1957 the group began to upgrade to the North American F-86 Sabre. However, its time with this plane would be short. By 1956, the Joint Chiefs of Staff were pressuring the Air Force to provide more wartime airlift. At the same time, about 150 Fairchild C-119 Flying Boxcars became available from the active force. Consequently, in November 1956 the Air Force directed Continental Air Command to convert three fighter bomber wings to the troop carrier mission by September 1957. The group was inactivated 16 November 1957 and most of its personnel transferred to the 440th Troop Carrier Group, which was simultaneously activated.

=== Strategic Airlift ===
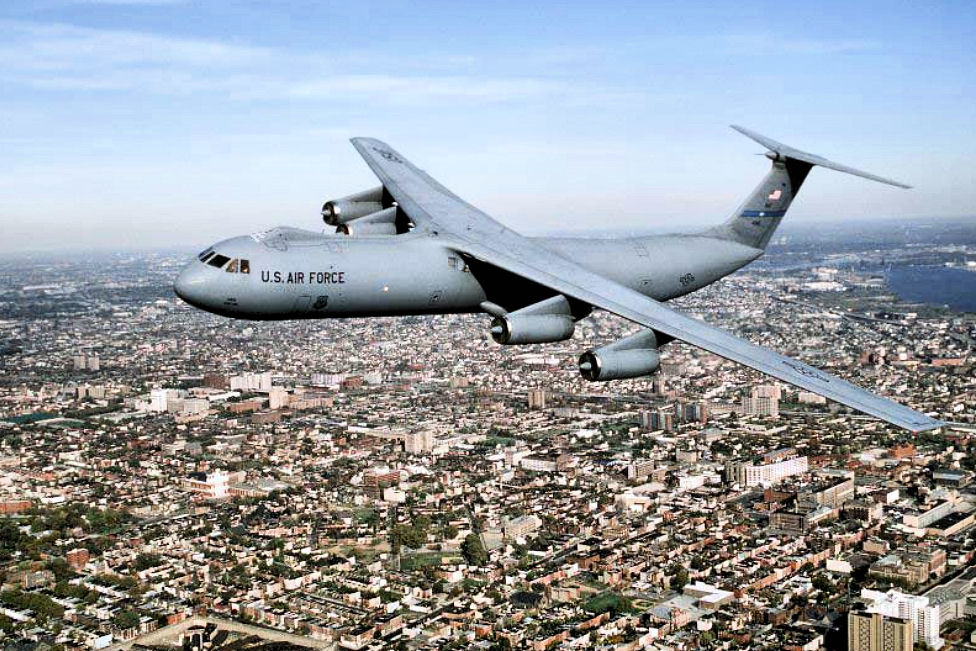
Group C-141 over Philadelphia

On 1 December 1991, the unit was activated as the 438th Operations Group as the operational component of the 438th Airlift Wing when Military Airlift Command implemented the Objective Wing organization. On 1 October 1993, the group's 30th Airlift Squadron moved on paper to Yokota Air Base, Japan, . It was replaced by the 13th Airlift Squadron which was transferred without personnel or equipment from the 18th Operations Group at Kadena Air Base, Okinawa.

On 1 October 1994, the group was inactivated and replaced at McGuire by the 305th Operations Group which was transferred from Grissom Air Force Base, Indiana when Grissom became an Air Force Reserve Command base.

=== Afghanistan and Iraq ===
The group was redesignated the 438th Air Expeditionary Group and converted to provisional status in December 2001. It was at Jacobabad Air Base, in the Sindh province of Pakistan, for Operation Enduring Freedom. The group was awarded an Air Force Outstanding Unit Award with Combat "V" Device for actions in 2002 and 2003.

It was again activated in 2007 at Al Asad Air Base in Al Anbar province, Iraq. Its mission was to provide close air support for U.S. and allied forces in the region with Fairchild Republic A-10 Thunderbolt II aircraft. At Al Asad, the group joined the 3rd Marine Aircraft Wing (Forward). Its initial A-10s were deployed from the 74th Fighter Squadron at Moody Air Force Base By September, the Moody "Warthogs" had been replaced by those of the 175th Wing of the Maryland Air National Guard. On 9 September, it made the first combat attack by an A-10C using the Joint Direct Attack Munition. The group was inactivated when its aircraft were moved to Bagram Air Base in late 2007

== Lineage ==
- Constituted as the 438th Troop Carrier Group on 14 May 1943

Activated on 1 June 1943
Inactivated on 16 September 1945

- Redesignated 438th Troop Carrier Group, Medium on 1 June 1949

Activated in the Reserves on 27 June 1949
Called to active duty on 10 March 1951
Inactivated on 14 March 1951

- Redesignated 438th Fighter-Bomber Group on 1 June 1952

Activated in the Reserves on 15 June 1952
Inactivated on 16 November 1957

- Redesignated 438th Operations Group and activated on 1 November 1991

Inactivated on 1 October 1994

- Redesignated 438th Air Expeditionary Group, converted to provisional status and assigned to Air Combat Command to activate or inactivate as needed on 4 December 2001

Activated by 16 September 2002
Inactivated after 15 September 2003
Activated on 15 January 2007
Inactivated c. December 2007

=== Assignments ===
- 53d Troop Carrier Wing, 1 Jun 1943
- I Troop Carrier Command, c. October 1943
- 53d Troop Carrier Wing, February 1944
- I Troop Carrier Command, 16 September 1945
- IX Troop Carrier Command, c. 1 October - 15 November 1945
- 438th Troop Carrier Wing, 27 June 1949 – 14 March 1951
- 438th Fighter-Bomber Wing, 15 June 1952 – 16 November 1957
- 438th Airlift Wing, 1 November 1991 – 1 October 1994
- Air Combat Command to activate or inactivate any time after 4 December 2001

Unknown, by 16 September 2002 - after 15 September 2003
332d Air Expeditionary Wing, 15 January 2007 - c. December 2007

=== Components ===
- 6th Airlift Squadron, 1 November 1991 – 1 October 1994
- 13th Airlift Squadron, 1 October 1993 – 1 October 1994
- 30th Airlift Squadron, 1 November 1991 – 1 October 1993
- 74th Expeditionary Fighter Squadron, 15 January 2007 - May 2007
- 104th Expeditionary Fighter Squadron, August - December 2007
- 87th Troop Carrier Squadron (later 87th Fighter-Bomber Squadron), 1 June 1943 – 22 September 1945; 27 June 1949 – 14 March 1951; 15 June 1952 – 16 November 1957
- 88th Troop Carrier Squadron (later 88th Fighter-Bomber), 1 June 1943 – 22 September 1945; 27 June 1949 – 14 March 1951; 15 June 1952 – 16 November 1957
- 89th Troop Carrier (later Fighter-Bomber) Squadron (4U), 1 June 1943 – 22 September 1945; 27 June 1949 – 14 March 1951; 15 June 1952 – 1 July 1957
- 90th Troop Carrier Squadron, 1 June 1943 – 22 September 1945; 27 June 1949 – 14 March 1951
- 438th Expeditionary Aircraft Maintenance Squadron, 15 January 2007 - December 2007
- 438th Expeditionary Support Squadron, 15 January 2007 - December 2007
- 438th Operations Support Squadron, 1 November 1991 – 1 October 1994

=== Stations ===
- Baer Field, Indiana, 1 June 1943
- Sedalia Army Air Field, Missouri, c. 11 June 1943
- Laurinburg-Maxton Army Air Base, North Carolina, 30 October 1943
- Baer Field, Indiana, c. 15 January - c. 28 January 1944
- RAF Langar (AAF-490), England, February 1944
- RAF Greenham Common (AAF-486), England, March 1944
- Prosnes Airfield (A-79), France, February 1945
- Amiens Glisy Airfield (B-48), France, May – c. 3 August 1945
- Baer Field, Indiana, c. 16 September 1945
- Lawson Field, Georgia, c. 1 October – 15 November 1945
- Offutt Air Force Base, Nebraska, 27 June 1949 – 14 March 1951
- General Billy Mitchell Field, Wisconsin, 15 June 1952
- Milwaukee, Wisconsin, 5 January 1953 – 16 November 1957
- McGuire Air Force Base, New Jersey, 1 November 1991 – 1 October 1994
- Possibly PAF Base Shahbaz, by 16 September 2002 - after 15 September 2003
- Al Asad Air Base, Iraq, 15 January 2007 - December 2007

=== Aircraft ===
- Douglas C-47 Skytrain, 1943–1945, 1949–1951
- North American T-6 Texan, 1949–1951, 1952–1954
- Curtiss C-46 Commando, 1945, 1949–1951
- North American F-51 Mustang, 1953–1954
- Lockheed T-33 T-Bird, 1954–1957
- Lockheed F-80 Shooting Star, 1954–1957
- North American F-86 Sabre, 1957
- Fairchild A-10 Thunderbolt II, 2007

=== Awards and campaigns ===
Award streamer	Award	Dates	Notes
	Distinguished Unit Citation	5 June 1944-7 June 1944	438 Troop Carrier Group
	Air Force Outstanding Unit Award with Combat "V" Device	16 September 2002-15 September 2003	438th Air Expeditionary Group

Campaign Streamer	Campaign	Dates	Notes
	Normandy	6 June 1944 – 24 July 1944	438th Troop Carrier Group
	Northern France	25 July 1944 – 14 September 1944	438th Troop Carrier Group
	Rome-Arno	20 July 1944 – 9 September 1944	438th Troop Carrier Group
	Southern France	15 August 1944 – 14 September 1944	438th Troop Carrier Group
	Rhineland	15 September 1944 – 21 March 1945	438th Troop Carrier Group
	Ardennes-Alsace	16 December 1944 – 25 January 1945	438th Troop Carrier Group
	Central Europe	22 March 1944 – 21 May 1945	438th Troop Carrier Group
	National Resolution	2007	438th Air Expeditionary Group
	Iraqi Surge	2007	438th Air Expeditionary Group
	Global War on Terror Expeditionary Medal		438th Air Expeditionary Group

== See also ==
- List of United States Air Force Groups
- List of C-47 Skytrain operators
- That's All, Brother, restored C-47 flown by 438th commander Lt. Col John Donalson as lead plane dropping paratroopers in Normandy landings
