= British Parachute Schools =

- Abbreviation: BPS
- Formation: 1977
- Legal status: Training school
- Purpose: Parachute training in the UK
- Location: Langar Airfield, Nottinghamshire, UK, NG13 9HY
- Region served: UK
- Affiliations: British Parachute Association
- Website: Skydive Langar

British Parachute Schools also known as Langar DZ or Skydive Langar is a BPA affiliated parachuting centre and skydiving drop zone at Langar, Nottinghamshire in the area known as the Vale of Belvoir.

== History ==
Langar airfield was originally a World War II bomber base, home to the RAF 207 Squadron between 1942 and 1943, but is now operating solely as a civilian drop zone. British Parachute Schools has been based at the airfield since 1977. British Parachute Schools was set up by Tom Sawyer and he encouraged use by universities. One of the first was Loughborough University who moved from Peterborough Parachute Centre after a chance meeting between Tom and Ian Parker, chairman of the university club. Parker's final year project was an analysis of parachute ripcord pull forces after a stiff pull on his first free fall.

== Equipment ==
The drop zone uses two Cessna Grand Caravans, both with Blackhawk engines. The centre provides student training in the Ram Air Progression System, Accelerated Freefall (AFF) and Tandem skydiving.

== Reputation ==
British Parachute Schools is the busiest civilian parachute centre in the United Kingdom, regularly completing over 30,000 descents a year. It is also the home of LU:ST; the Langar Universities Skydiving Team; the largest collection of university skydiving clubs in the country. It is approved by the British Parachute Association. Many university parachute clubs use the site regularly.

== Incidents ==
- 38 year old Roger Neal of Trent Lock, both parachutes failed to open at 3,000ft, in early October 1981.
- Early October 1989, Marcus Beck, 18, of Cropwell Bishop, and Peter Knight, 28, of Derbyshire, became entangled at 3,000ft. Both had emergency surgery at the Queen's Medical Centre.

== See also ==
- Red Devils (Parachute Regiment)
