= Ernesto Gainza Medina =

Venezuelan skydiver, stunt performer and coordinator

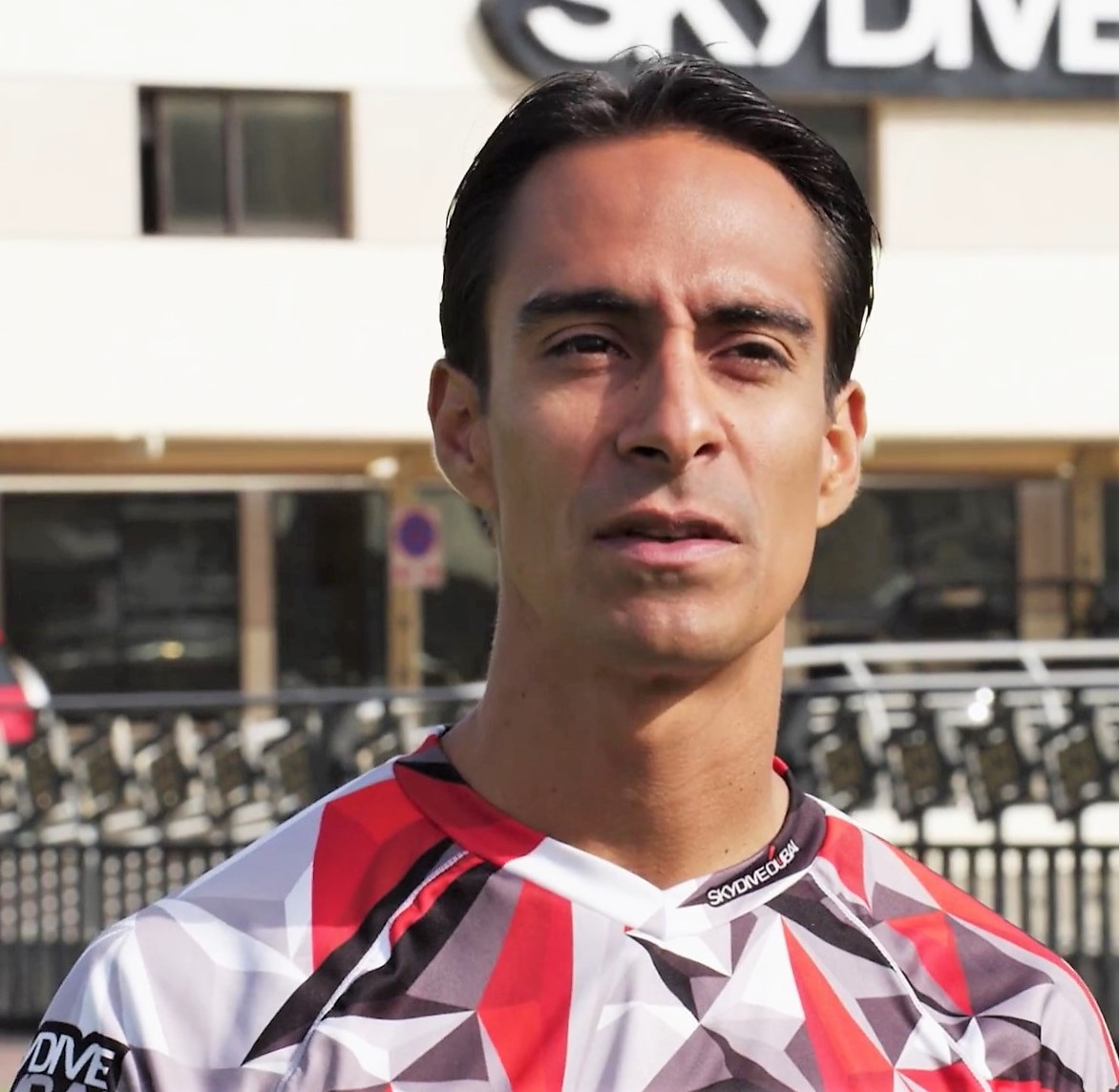
Gainza in Dubai in 2014

Ernesto Gainza Medina (born March 5, 1979, in Valencia, Venezuela) is a professional skydiver, stunt performer and stunt coordinator, skydiving consultant, skydiving instructor and instructor examiner. He is also an experienced BASE jumper, wingsuit flyer and Guinness world record holder.

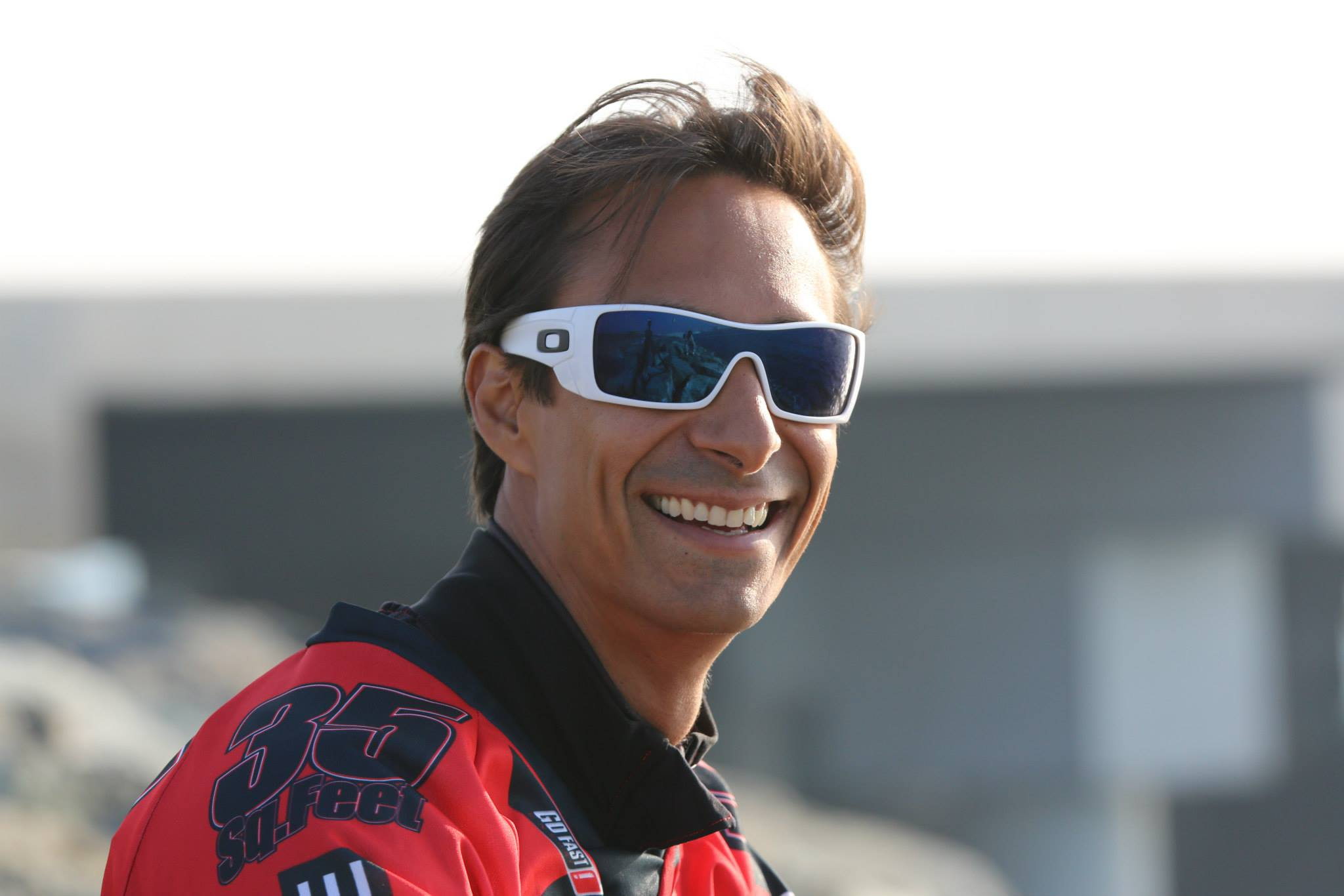
Gainza in 2015

== Professional career ==
=== Ratings ===
- United States Parachute Association professional exhibition jumper
- United States Parachute Association coach
- United States Parachute Association coach examiner
- United States Parachute Association accelerated free-fall Instructor
- United States Parachute Association accelerated free-fall Instructor examiner

=== Parachuting certificates of proficiency & licenses ===
- United States Parachute Association “A”, “B”, “C”, “D” license holder
- British Parachute Association “A”, “B”, “C” license holder
- Emirates Aerosports federation “D” license holder
- Fédération Française de Parachutisme Brevet "B3" "B4" "B5" "C"

=== Appointments ===
- United States Parachute Association Safety & Training Advisor 2013–2016
- Emirates Aerosports Federation Safety & Training advisor 2013–2015

=== Competitions ===
- World championships in canopy piloting, Czech Republic, 2011
- Italian canopy piloting nationals 2010
- Czech canopy piloting nationals 2007, 2009, 2011
- Spanish canopy piloting nationals 2007, 2008, 2009
- German canopy piloting nationals 2007 and 2009
- World championships in canopy piloting, South Africa, 2009
- British Parachute Association skydiving nationals 2005

== Guinness World Records ==
- Most crossings of the Equator during a parachute jump. Coaque, Ecuador January 2020)
- Landing the world's smallest parachute, JVX 35sf by Icarus Canopies by NZ Aero Sports. Dubai(UAE) April 2014
- Most skydivers to parachute from a balloon simultaneously Skydive Dubai(UAE), February 2013
