= That's All, Brother =

Lead aircraft in paratrooper drops during 1944 Normandy invasion

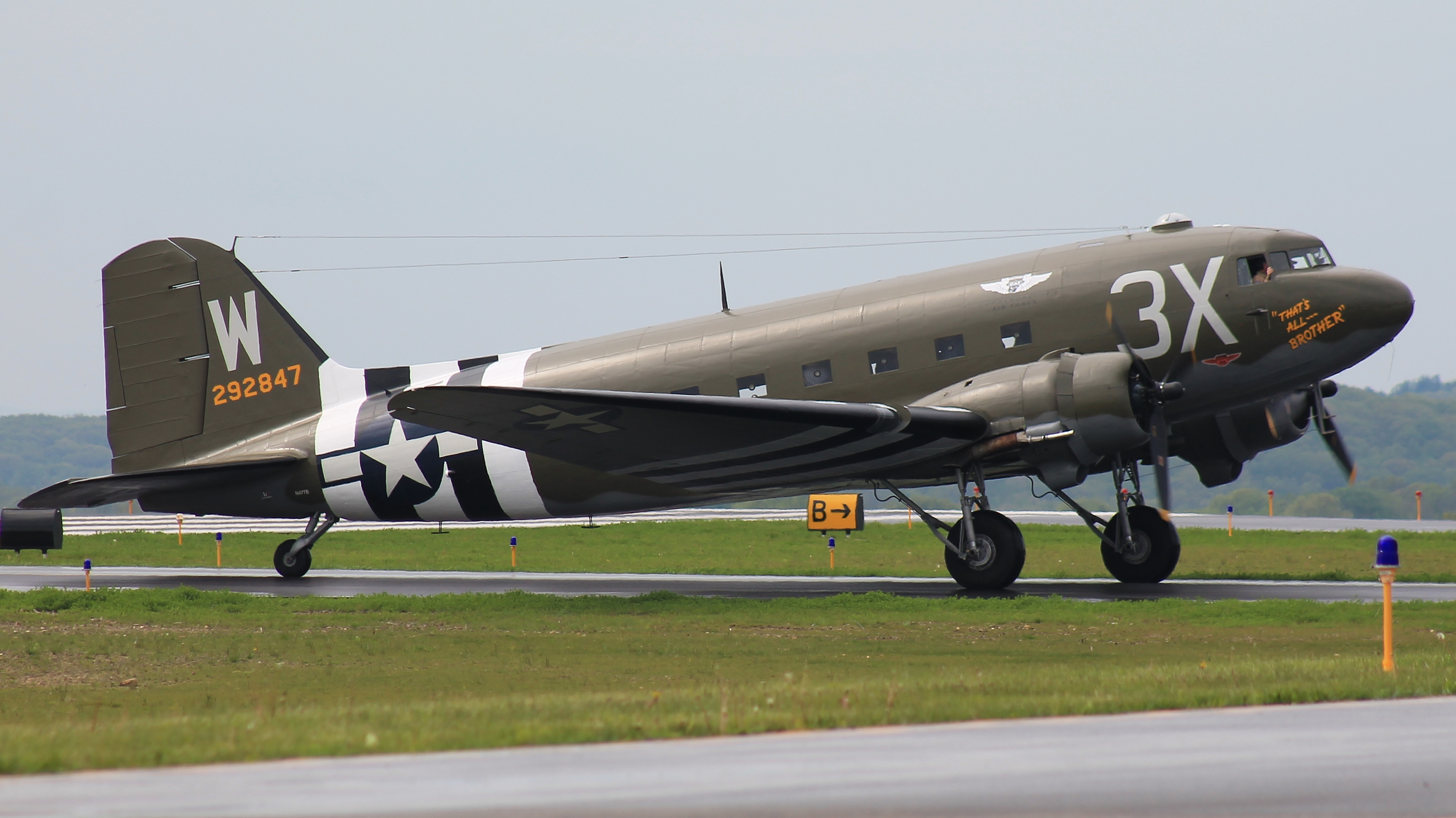
- That's All, Brother taxiing at Waterbury–Oxford Airport, 17 May 2019.

General information
- Type: Douglas C-47 Skytrain
- Manufacturer: Douglas Aircraft Company
- Status: Restored, airworthy
- Owners: United States Army Air Forces, various civilian operators, Commemorative Air Force (CAF)
- Registration: N88874; N47TB
- Serial: 42-92847

History
- Manufactured: March 7, 1944
- First flight: March 8, 1944
- In service: April 8, 1944 – August 5, 1945
- Preserved at: Based with the CAF's Central Texas Wing

That's All, Brother (Note: Styled as "That's All--Brother" on the airplane itself) is a Douglas C-47 Skytrain aircraft (the military version of the civilian DC-3) that led the formation of 800 others from which approximately 13,000 U.S. paratroopers jumped on D-Day, June 6, 1944, the beginning of the liberation of France in the last two years of World War II. After the war it was returned to the United States and sold to civilian owners, eventually falling victim to neglect until it was found in an Oshkosh, Wisconsin, boneyard in 2015, facing imminent modification to be converted into a modern turboprop-powered aircraft. It has since been restored and is part of the Commemorative Air Force.

The C-47's name, painted on its nose, was chosen by Army Air Forces Lt. Col. John M. Donalson, commander of the 87th Troop Carrier Squadron, who flew the plane during the operation, as a "message to Adolf Hitler" that Nazi Germany's days were numbered. It was successfully flown again in 2018, and has been exhibited at air shows. After further refitting it has been flown across the Atlantic with other historic aircraft that took part in the invasion, to commemorate its 75th anniversary.

== History ==
=== Military service ===
When the war began, John Donalson, who flew with the 106th Observation Squadron of the Alabama National Guard, was transferred from the Pacific theater to Europe. Normally, he flew a Douglas C-47 Skytrain that he had named Belle of Birmingham, in honor of his home state's largest city. For Operation Overlord, the 1944 invasion of Normandy which opened the western front, it was necessary to cut holes in the plane's fuselage for extra equipment. Donalson, by then commanding the 438th Troop Carrier Group, refused to make this modification. He was issued another C-47 to lead the formation of those aircraft which dropped paratroopers onto the French coast.

The C-47 issued to Donalson had been built three months earlier at the Douglas Aircraft plant in Oklahoma City. It was delivered the day after completion to what was then the United States Army Air Forces at Love Field in Dallas; from there it was flown to Baer Army Air Field in Fort Wayne, Indiana. Five weeks later it was flown to England by the Air Transport Command. Donalson named his new plane That's All, Brother, as a personal message to Adolf Hitler that Nazi Germany's dominance of Europe would soon be ended.

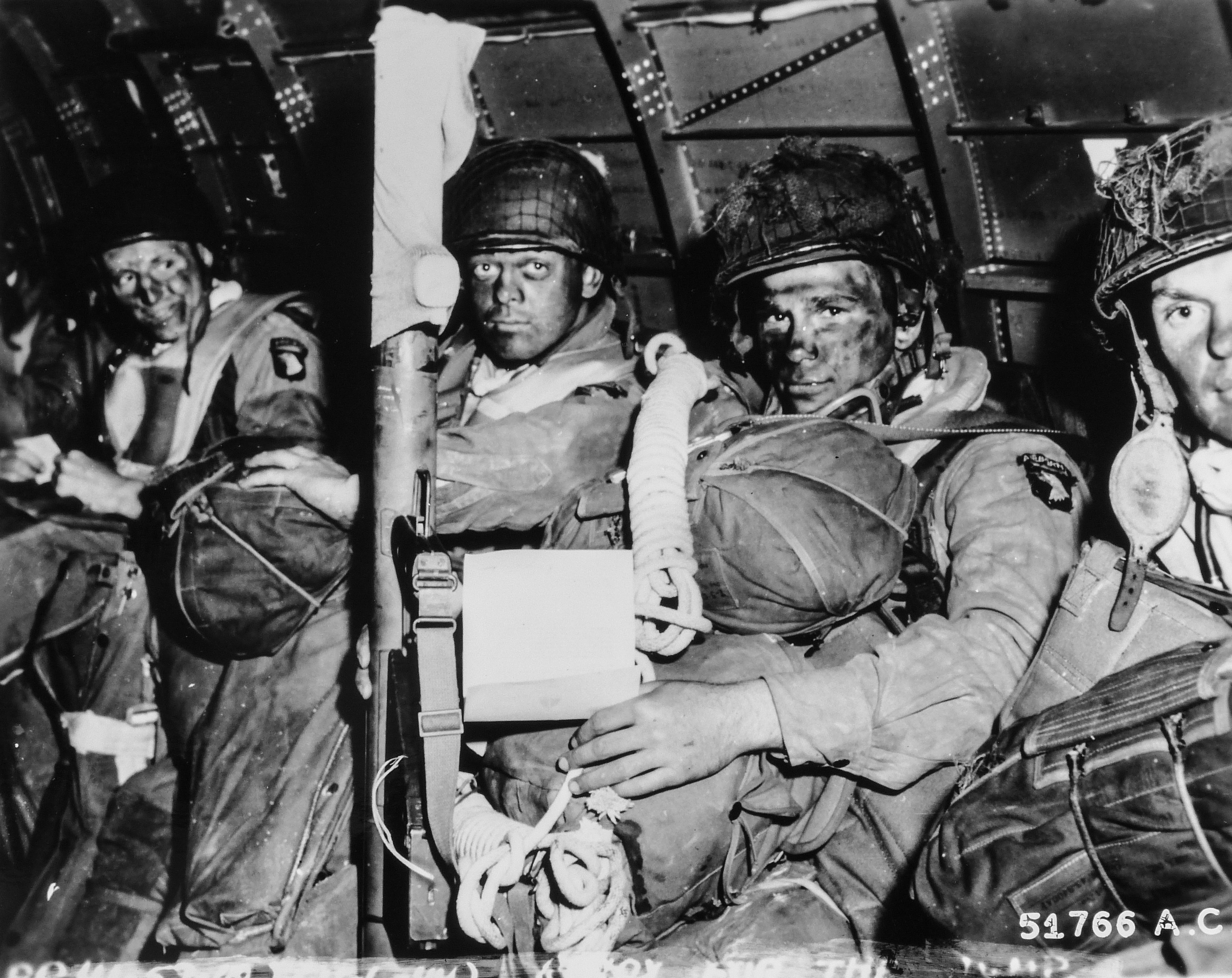
Paratroopers shortly before takeoff for the drop zone on D-Day morning

On the morning of June 6, That's All, Brother led 800 planes that dropped over 13,000 American paratroopers onto the French coast. It was chosen for the job because it had been equipped with radar that could find the beacons dropped to mark drop zones by an earlier group of paratroopers known as The Pathfinders. Allied troops held their beachhead despite heavy initial losses, and slowly began liberating France. The C-47 was used in other operations in Western Europe later that year, including Market Garden, and Repulse (part of the resupplying of Bastogne), and in 1945's Operation Varsity, part of the invasion of Germany.

=== Civilian use ===
By the end of the war, the plane had been flown back to the United States and decommissioned. It was sold on the civilian market as surplus. During the decades after the war it passed through 12 private owners, who generally kept it in good condition, never crashing or seriously damaging it as they put it to a variety of uses, although none of them were apparently aware of its historic importance. It was modified into a more conventional DC-3 configuration and painted in a scheme common to such craft during the Vietnam War.

=== Restoration ===
The plane's rediscovery began in 2006. That year Staff Sergeant Matthew Scales, assigned to the 106th Air Refueling Squadron, the descendant of the 106th Observation Squadron, began researching the unit's history. Most focused on the squadron's work in the South Pacific, but he learned that a former member of the 106th had flown the lead plane on D-Day. "I didn't understand how this was possible, as, on June 6, 1944, my squadron was about as far away from Normandy as humanly possible," he recalled later.

The next year, Scales transferred to the Air Force Historical Research Agency to continue his research. He found the records of Donalson's transfer from the 106th to fly C-47s. Along with those records was the military serial number of That's All, Brother, as well as the tail number it had borne as a civilian aircraft, allowing him to track it to its owner in Mesa, Arizona.

Initially, Scales thought the plane was the Belle of Birmingham, Donalson's usual aircraft. The current owner had restored it to airworthiness, and promised to keep it in good condition when he learned of its historic importance. Scales contacted the owner again when he learned the plane was actually That's All, Brother, but by that point it had been sold. Basler Turbo Conversions, of Oshkosh, Wisconsin, had bought the plane to be modernized into a BT-67. (Note: That model is considered particularly desirable for such conversions, according to one pilot. "There is no other airplane out there that will do what a turbine DC-3 will ... It's a 200-knot (230 mph) cruise airplane that will hold 10 to 12,000 pounds (4.5 to 5.4 t) with lots of cubes, and you can land it on gravel or snow with skis. It literally has no peers.") The company made four of these conversions per year in a process which left only 30 percent of the original aircraft’s parts. The owner had flown it to Basler's location at Wittman Regional Airport, and the company had put it in their boneyard to await the procedure, scheduled to begin within six months.

After the plane's serial number was found, proving it was That's All, Brother, stories were published. Organizations and private collectors made offers to buy the plane from Basler. Eventually the Commemorative Air Force (CAF), an organization which restores and flies vintage planes, primarily to exhibit at air shows, took possession of the C-47.

The CAF set itself the goal of restoring the aircraft not only to the point of airworthiness but having it participate in the D-Day 75th anniversary ceremonies in 2019. While the organization's Minnesota Wing provided sufficient volunteer labor to assist the experts at Basler, it needed money as well. In 2015, after the rediscovered plane was put on public display for the first time at the EAA AirVenture Oshkosh air show, a CAF executive started a Kickstarter campaign. This campaign successfully raised $330,000, over four times its original goal of $75,000.

Contemporary film footage revealed the aircraft's name, which facilitated fundraising. Basler's expertise proved necessary when initial assessments revealed substantial metal corrosion, requiring 1,600 hours of repair work. The Kickstarter funds also bought replacement wiring for much of the plane.

During the corrosion repair, analysis was able to find some patches of the original paint remaining, allowing experts to match those colors with modern paints. When repainting the plane as it had been prepared for the 1944 invasion, some imperfections found on pictures of the plane from that era were replicated for historical authenticity. The black and white invasion stripes near the plane's tail were painted crudely. This was to replicate their hasty application, done on the day before the invasion with whatever brushes were available. The stripes were left off one of the troop doors to be consistent with the appearance of That's All, Brother on the morning of D-Day, since planners chalked numbers on each plane to guide troops to their assignments.

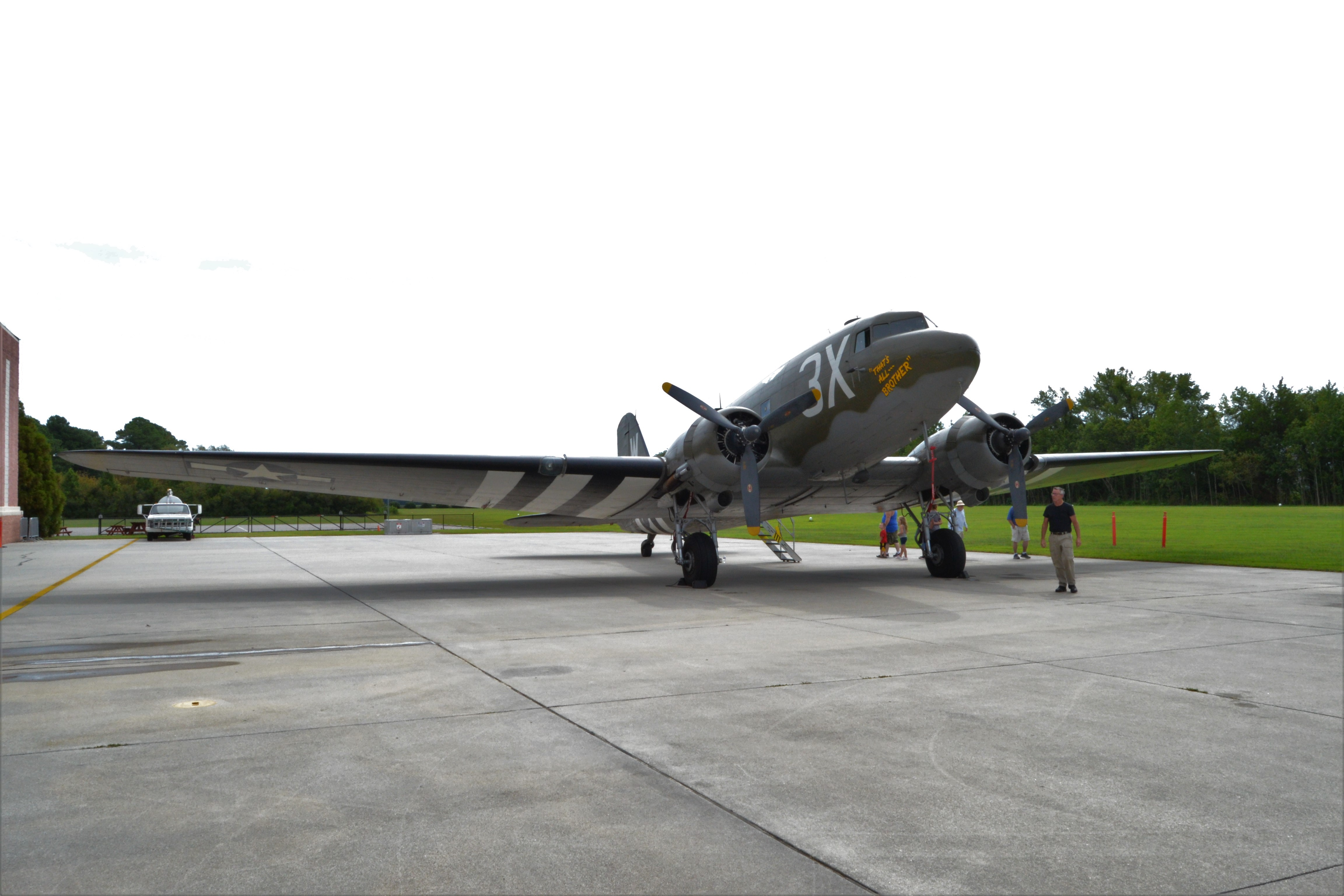
That's All Brother at the Military Aviation Museum, Virginia Beach following an airshow.

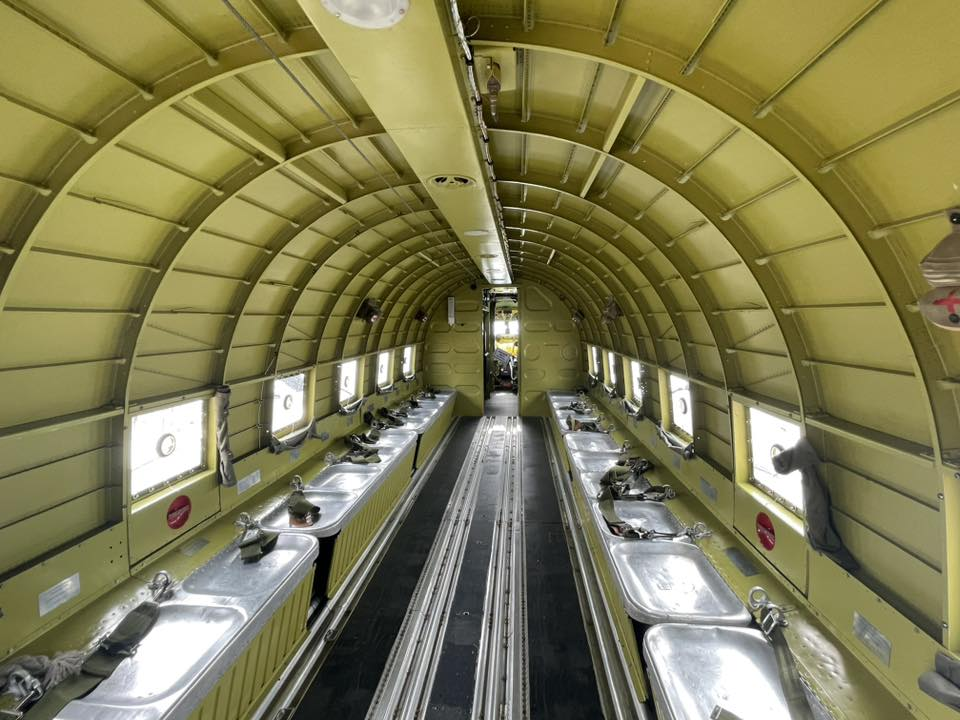
Inside view of That's All Brother.

In 2017, That's All, Brother was assigned to the Central Texas Wing of the CAF, based in San Marcos. Filmmaker Nik Coleman began a feature-length documentary about the restoration. The wings were rebuilt and most of the mechanical systems installed, including the original Pratt & Whitney R-1830 Twin Wasp engines and propellers. According to Basler's president, about 85% of the original plane was restorable. Volunteers from the CAF looked worldwide for authentic World War II-era parts to cover the rest. A removable plate with vintage gauges hides modern avionics equipment for navigation and communications, including automatic dependent surveillance – broadcast.

At the end of January 2018, the restored aircraft made its first flight in years, a short test circuit from Wittman. It was livestreamed to viewers around the world on Facebook. Pilot Doug Rozendaal, who had been part of early efforts to find and restore the C-47, described it as "almost squawk-free". Afterward, it was flown to San Marcos so the Central Texas Wing could finish the restoration and turn the plane into a flying museum. "We want this to be the most authentic D-Day C-47 on the planet," said the CAF's Adam Smith.

=== Air shows ===
External videos
- "'That's All, Brother Paris Airshow from the Cockpit"; in-cockpit and external video from the Paris Air Show

In the year after its first flight, That's All, Brother logged 100 more hours in the air going to and from various air shows. At Wings over Dallas, a World War II-themed show in October 2018, attendees paid $249 per seat for short flights, with the aircraft's interior rebuilt to look as it had on D-Day, with bare metal seats, belts, and an overhead anchorline cable to which the paratroopers attached their Static line. All seven flights sold out. The aircraft was also featured during the 2019 Paris Air Show.

External videos
- "'That's All, Brother' C-47 Ride Along at SUN 'n FUN 2019"; video shot from aircraft by passenger

Another goal of the restorers has been to identify the paratroopers who went to Normandy aboard That's All, Brother and reach out to them or their descendants. Two grandchildren of Donalson, who had died in 1987 after having risen to the rank of major general, rode the aircraft at an Alabama air show in early 2019. In March 2019, the CAF learned that one of the few surviving D-Day paratroopers, although not one who had jumped from That's All, Brother, was not expecting to attend the 75th anniversary ceremonies in France due to his own failing health. They took the plane to Dayton, Ohio, where he lived, so he could see and ride in the restored aircraft.

== D-Day 75th anniversary ceremonies ==
On May 18, 2019, That's All, Brother made a ceremonial flyby of the Statue of Liberty before joining other restored American World War II aircraft that had participated in the invasion for "Daks Over Normandy", (Note: Dak is an abbreviation for "Dakota", the RAF and RAAF designation for the C-47 Skytrain.) a ceremonial re-enactment of the air operations using the original craft, organized in Britain. The convoy flew the same multi-segment route across the Atlantic Ocean to the U.K. airfields as all American aircraft used on D-Day did. After spending several days training in safety procedures in Oxford, Connecticut, the convoy flew through the same airbases, hopping a northerly route across the ocean: Presque Isle, Maine; Goose Bay, Labrador; Narsarsuaq, Greenland; Reykjavík, Iceland, then to Prestwick Airport outside Glasgow, Scotland and finally to Duxford Aerodrome in southern England for "Daks Over Normandy" on June 6, 2019.

That's All, Brother's schedule includes participation in anniversary events for a week, including a re-enactment of the original drop on June 6 with paratroopers jumping into the original drop zone, followed by return to the U.S. to resume its air show schedule. The CAF plans to add speakers and sensors to make it a "living classroom", where schoolchildren on the plane can understand what it was like to be the paratroopers heading for their drops. According to Joe Enzminger of the Central Texas Wing, the plane is in good enough shape to keep it flying for possibly another century.

== See also ==
- History of the United States Air Force
- List of surviving Douglas C-47 Skytrains
- Order of battle for the American airborne landings in Normandy
