= British Parachute Association =

UK governing body for skydiving

British Skydiving
- Sport: Skydiving
- Founded: 1961
- Chairperson: Tony Crilly
- CEO: Robert Gibson
- Secretary: Elizabeth Butcher

Official website
- www.britishskydiving.org
- (United Kingdom)

British Skydiving is the national governing body for skydiving in the United Kingdom.

== Overview ==
British Skydiving was founded in 1960 to organise, govern and further the advancement of sport parachuting within the UK.

British Skydiving aims to encourage participation in skydiving within the UK. In 2016 there were nearly 6,000 full members and around 60,000 students, and around 30 affiliated training organisations.

The association is funded by membership subscriptions and has an annually elected council which controls all aspects of skydiving on behalf of the Civil Aviation Authority. Unlike many other sports which suffer from fragmented and divided governing bodies, the British Parachute Association represents most UK skydivers, and most skydivers within the UK are members of the Association.

British Skydiving is constituted as a company limited by guarantee. The association's headquarters are at Glen Parva, Leicestershire.

Following the 50th anniversary of British Skydiving, an archive project was established to record and collect the history of the sport in the UK and of the Association.

The association's name was changed to British Skydiving on 27 November 2019 to bring awareness of the sport to a greater audience.

== Council ==
British Skydiving council consists of ten elected members, together with two independent directors from outside the sport. The council is chaired by Tony Crilly.

== Drop zones ==
In 2026 there were 20 affiliated drop zones British Skydiving that are open to the public and within the UK. These include:

England

- Army Parachute Association – Netheravon, Wiltshire
- Beccles Skydivers – Beccles, Suffolk
- Black Knights Parachute Club Ltd – Cockerham, Lancashire
- Cornish Parachute Club – Perranporth Airfield, Perranporth, Cornwall
- Sibson Skydivers – Sibson Airfield, Wansford, Peterborough, Cambridgeshire
- SkyHigh Skydiving (formerly Peterlee Parachute Centre) – Shotton Airfield, Shotton Colliery, County Durham
- Skydive Chatteris Club Ltd – Chatteris, Cambridgeshire
- Skydive GB – East Leys Farm, Grindale, Bridlington, East Riding of Yorkshire
- Skydive Headcorn – Headcorn Aerodrome, Ashford, Kent
- Skydive Hibaldstow – Hibaldstow, North Lincolnshire
- Skydive Hinton – Hinton Airfield, Steane, Brackley, Northamptonshire
- Skydive Langar – Langar Airfield, Langar, Nottinghamshire
- Skydive Northwest – Cark Airfield, Moor Lane, Flookburgh, Cumbria
- Skydive Southwest – Dunkeswell Airfield, Devon
- Skydive Tilstock Freefall Club – Tilstock, Whitchurch, Shropshire

Scotland

- Skydive St Andrews – Fife Airport, Glenrothes, Fife
- Skydive Strathallan – Strathallan Airfield, near Auchterarder, Perthshire

Ireland

- Skydive Ireland (formerly Wild Geese Parachute Centre) – Movenis Airfield, Carrowreagh Road, Garvagh, Coleraine, County Londonderry

Other UK Territories

- Skydive Jersey – La Route de la Haule, St. Peter, Jersey
- Skydive Sandown – Sandown Airfield, Scotchells Brook Lane, Sandown, Isle of Wight
