= Prosnes Airfield =

Abandoned airfield in France

Prosnes Airfield Advanced Landing Ground (ALG) A-79
- Champagne-Ardenne Region, France

Site information
- Type: Military airfield
- Controlled by: United States Army Air Forces

Location
- Coordinates: 49°10′34″N 004°16′20″E

Site history
- Built by: IX Engineering Command
- In use: September 1944-July 1945
- Materials: Pierces Steel Planking (PSP)
- Battles/wars: Western Front (World War II); Northern France Campaign

Prosnes Airfield is an abandoned World War II military airfield which is located in the vicinity of Prosnes, approximately 12 miles (19 km) east-southeast of Reims and 90 miles (140 km) northeast of Paris.

The airfield was a semi-permanent facility built by the USAAF in the Champagne region west of Monte Carnillet which was a fiercely contested region of the World War I Western Front. The 6000' Pierced Steel Planking runway of the airfield supported Fighters and transports from September 1944 through the end of the war in Europe.

== History ==
Known as Advanced Landing Ground "A-79", the airfield consisted of a single 6000' PSP runway aligned 08/25. In addition, with tents were used for billeting and also for support facilities; an access road was built to the existing road infrastructure; a dump for supplies, ammunition, and gasoline drums, along with a drinkable water and minimal electrical grid for communications and station lighting.

Combat units stationed at the airfield were:

- 362d Fighter Group, 19 September-5 November 1944 (P-47)
- 425th Night Fighter Squadron, 13 October-9 November 1944 (P-61)
- 438th Troop Carrier Group, 16 February–19 May 1945 (C-47)

The fighter planes flew support missions, patrolling roads in front of the beachhead; strafing German military vehicles and dropping bombs on gun emplacements, anti-aircraft artillery and concentrations of German troops when spotted.

After the war ended, the facility was dismantled, and the land turned over to local French authorities. Today there is little or no physical evidence of its existence or its location other than some isolated concrete areas, which were likely part of the air base. In the woods to the southeast of the base appears to be some World War I relics of trenches, still visible nearly a century after World War I ended.

== See also ==
- Advanced Landing Ground
