= Amiens – Glisy Aerodrome =

Amiens - Glisy Aerodrome Aérodrome d'Amiens - Glisy
- IATA: QFY; ICAO: LFAY

Summary
- Airport type: Public
- Operator: CCI d’Amiens
- Serves: Amiens, France
- Location: Glisy
- Elevation AMSL: 208 ft (63 m)
- Coordinates: 49°52′23″N 002°23′13″E

Map
- Location in Picardy region Location of Picardy region in France

Runways
Direction	Length		Surface
Direction	m	ft	Surface
12/30	1,300	4,265	Asphalt
12R/30L	900	2,953	Grass
- Sources: AIP France, UAF

Amiens – Glisy Aerodrome (French: Aérodrome d'Amiens - Glisy, ICAO: LFAY) is an airport serving Amiens, the capital city of the Somme department of the Picardy (Picardie) region in France. The airport is located 7 km (4 mi) east-southeast of Amiens, in Glisy.

The airport is used for general aviation, with no commercial airline service.

== History ==
During World War II the airport was used by the German Luftwaffe during the occupation of France. It was attacked by the United States Army Air Force on several occasions in the spring of 1944. Later, it was liberated by the British Second Army in August 1944. RAF and RNZAF de Havilland Mosquito operated from this field from August to November 1944 as the allied armies pushed west.

The airfield was then used by the Americans as a troop carrier and transport airfield flying C-47 Skytrain aircraft. It was known as Amiens/Glisy Airfield or Advanced Landing Ground B-48. Units that were assigned to the airfield were the 315th Troop Carrier Group (12AF) and 1st Troop Carrier Pathfinder Squadron (Provisional) (9th AF). It was also the headquarters of the Twelfth Air Force 52nd Troop Carrier Wing. Shortly after the war the 438th Troop Carrier Group (53rd Wing, 9th AF) was stationed from 18 May - 25 July.

== Facilities ==
The airport resides at an elevation of 208 feet (63 m) above mean sea level. It has one paved runway designated 12/30 with an asphalt surface measuring 1,300 by 25 metres (4,265 ft × 82 ft). It also has a parallel unpaved runway with a grass surface measuring 900 by 100 metres (2,953 ft × 328 ft).
