= RAF Langar =

Former Royal Air Force station

RAF Langar USAAF Station AAF-490 RCAF Langar
- Langar, Nottinghamshire in England
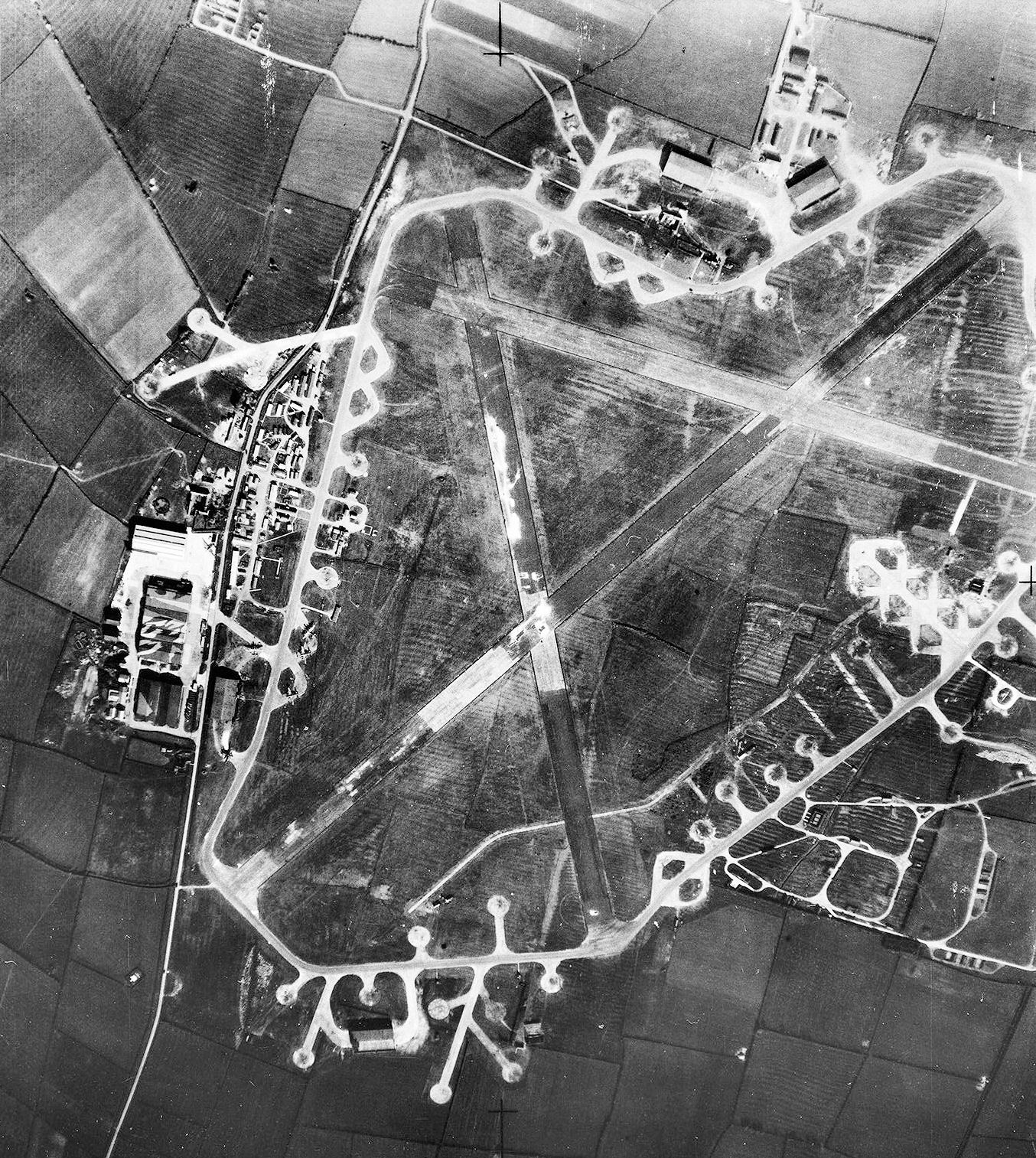
- Aerial photograph of RAF Langar airfield, the control tower and technical site are at the left, the bomb dump is to the right, 17 April 1945

Site information
- Type: Royal Air Force station satellite station 1942-43; 72 Base substation 1944-46
- Code: LA
- Owner: Ministry of Defence
- Operator: Royal Air Force; United States Army Air Forces; Royal Canadian Air Force
- Controlled by: RAF Bomber Command * No. 5 Group RAF * No. 7 (T) Group RAF; Ninth Air Force

Location
- Shown within Nottinghamshire RAF Langar (the United Kingdom)
- Coordinates: 52°53′30″N 000°54′07″W

Site history
- Built: 1942
- Built by: George Wimpey & Co Ltd
- In use: September 1942 - 1968
- Battles/wars: European theatre of World War II

Airfield information
- Elevation: 36 metres (118 ft) AMSL
Runways
Direction	Length and surface
01/19	Asphalt
07/25	Asphalt
00/00	Concrete/Asphalt

Royal Air Force Langar or more simply RAF Langar is a former Royal Air Force station located near the village of Langar, Nottinghamshire, England. The airfield is located approximately 6 miles (9.7 km) east-southeast of Radcliffe on Trent.

Opened in 1942 during the Second World War, it was used by both the Royal Air Force and United States Army Air Forces. During the war it was used primarily as troop carrier transport airfield. After the war it was provided to the Royal Canadian Air Force which used it as an operational base until 1963.

Today the airfield is the location for the British Parachute Schools, who use the original control tower for their headquarters. The former Avro industrial complex is used by private industry.

== History ==
=== RAF Bomber Command use ===
The first flying unit arrived in September 1942 when No. 207 Squadron RAF arrived with Lancaster bombers from RAF Bottesford. 207 Squadron was a major RAF Bomber Command unit and participated in major raids on occupied Europe.

Also, in September 1942, A.V. Roe Ltd. prepared to use a large hangar complex on the west side of the Langar/Harby road to carry out major repair and maintenance of Lancasters.

The squadron remained until October 1943 when it moved to RAF Spilsby.

=== USAAF use ===
In November 1943 Langar was transferred to the USAAF Ninth Air Force as a troop carrier group base. Langar was known as USAAF Station AAF-490 for security reasons by the USAAF during the war, and by which it was referred to instead of location. Its USAAF Station Code was "LA".

==== 435th Troop Carrier Group ====
The 435th Troop Carrier Group arrived at Langar on 3 November 1943 from Baer AAF Indiana with four squadrons of 56 Douglas C-47 Skytrains. Operational squadrons of the group were:

- 75th Troop Carrier Squadron (SH, then CK)
- 76th Troop Carrier Squadron (CW)
- 77th Troop Carrier Squadron (IB)
- 78th Troop Carrier Squadron (CM)

The 435th TCW was assigned to the 53rd Troop Carrier Wing.

The group began operational training at the airfield, however it was moved on 25 January 1944 to RAF Welford to train alongside the 101st Airborne Division.

==== 438th Troop Carrier Group ====
Langar remained vacant for about a month until the 438th Troop Carrier Group arrived in early February 1944 from Baer AAF, Indiana. Operational squadrons of the group were:

- 87th Troop Carrier Squadron (3X)
- 88th Troop Carrier Squadron (M2)
- 89th Troop Carrier Squadron (4U)
- 90th Troop Carrier Squadron (Q7)

The 438th TCW was assigned to the 53rd Troop Carrier Wing. Like its predecessor, the group was moved south after a month to a new station at RAF Greenham Common.

==== 441st Troop Carrier Group ====
The 441st Troop Carrier Group arrived at Langar on 17 March Baer AAF Indiana with four squadrons of 56 C-47s. Those being:

- 99th Troop Carrier Squadron (3J)
- 100th Troop Carrier Squadron (8C)
- 301st Troop Carrier Squadron (Z4)
- 302d Troop Carrier Squadron (2L)

The 441st was a group of Ninth Air Force's 50th Troop Carrier Wing, IX Troop Carrier Command. It was scheduled to be assigned to Langar, however it only remained until 25 April until being moved to RAF Merryfield. The 441st would return to Langar for a short period in September 1944 to fly elements of the US 82nd Airborne Division to Nijmegen for Operation MARKET.

In August 1944 Langar was returned to RAF control for operational use.

=== Post D-Day use ===
In October 1944, RAF Bomber Command returned to Langar moving in with No. 1669 Heavy Conversion Unit RAF with 32 Lancasters which used the station until March 1945. Although retained by the Air Ministry. The airfield was used after the war for a short time for prisoners of war and then for displaced persons. Early in 1952 it was taken over by the Royal Canadian Air Force (RCAF) to become a supply station be for their NATO squadrons. The airfield was constructed on the old domestic and technical sites with completely new buildings, to a much higher standard than the Air Ministry was used to, by an English design team led by architect Peter Benton, under the direction of an RCAF officer. For 12 months nearly 1000 men worked constructing the station, which worked around two two-acre warehouses. another was added later and is now in private ownership. The first RCAF personnel arrived autumn 1952.

The airfield was used for eleven years (1952–1963) as 30 Air Materiel Base, RCAF Langar. Langar was the RCAF's primary supply station for No. 1 Air Division RCAF in Europe, a complex of four fighter bases set up in nearby RAF North Luffenham and in France and West Germany by Canada to help meet NATO's European air defence commitments during the Cold War. It was the only Canadian airfield in the UK.

The RCAF established No. 30 Air Materiel Base (AMB), to handle the transportation of supplies, equipment, aircraft, personnel, and other support essential for the operation of the four NATO air bases and its headquarters. Several units were attached to 30 AMB; No. 137 (Transport) Flight, which was attached to the Movements Unit of 30 AMB, operated several types of aircraft including six Bristol Freighters, one Beechcraft Expeditor, and two Dakotas. No. 312 Supply Depot handled medical supplies and spares for mechanical equipment, including aircraft (e.g. the F-86 Sabre) and vehicles. No. 314 Technical Services Unit was tasked with inspecting all supplies before they were forwarded to operational bases. This unit also assisted with repair contracts and provided technical advice.

== Current use ==
With the facility released from military control in 1963, the airfield (now called Langar Airfield) is the base for the British Parachute Schools, who use the original control tower for their headquarters. The former Avro industrial complex is used by private industry. There is a go-karting track.

The airfield is relatively intact, with most of its wartime facilities still in use. The main runway (01/19) and NE/SW secondary (07/25) are still active and in use. The original technical site is still in use, along with both wartime T-2 hangars. Additional postwar hangars and a secondary maintenance site built to the northwest, along with many of the loop dispersal hardstands around the wartime perimeter track still exist.

=== Parachuting ===
In 1987, parachutist Adrian Rees fell 2,300ft, and his parachute never opened.

== See also ==
- List of former Royal Air Force stations
