= 482nd Operations Group =

482d Operations Group

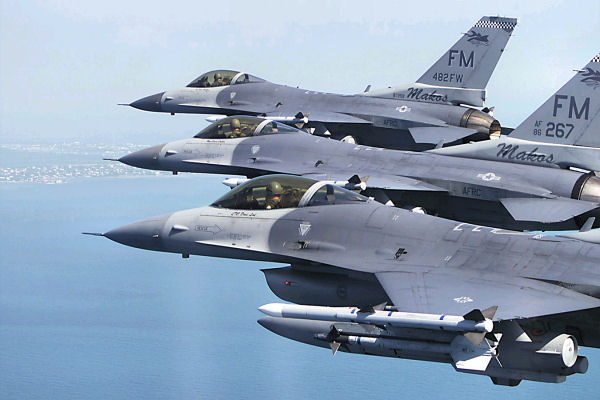
- 93d Fighter Squadron F-16s over Biscayne Bay, Florida (Note: Identifiable is General Dynamics F-16C Block 30D Fighting Falcon serial 86-267.)
- Active: 1943–1945; 1947–1949; 1952; 1955–1957; 1992–present
- Country: United States
- Branch: United States Air Force
- Role: Fighter
- Part of: Air Force Reserve Command
- Engagements: European Theater of Operations
- Decorations: Distinguished Unit Citation; Air Force Outstanding Unit Award

Insignia
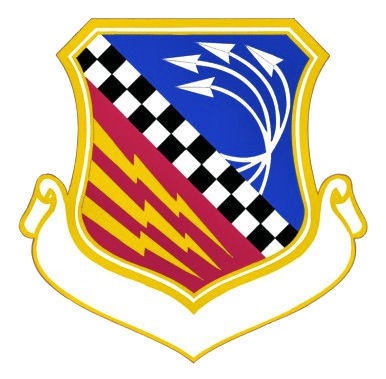
- 482d Operations Group emblem (Note: The group uses the 482d Fighter Wing emblem with the group designation on the scroll. Endicott, Factsheet 482 Operations Group.)
- Tail code: FM

The 482d Operations Group is a United States Air Force Reserve unit assigned to the 482d Fighter Wing. It is stationed at Homestead Air Reserve Base, Florida.

During World War II, the group was activated in England as the 482d Bombardment Group (Pathfinder), the only Eighth Air Force radar-equipped pathfinder heavy bomber group. Its Boeing B-17 Flying Fortress and Consolidated B-24 Liberator aircraft were equipped with first generation radars to guide other bombardment groups to targets obscured by cloud cover over Occupied Europe and Nazi Germany, earning a Distinguished Unit Citation. In 1944, it was removed from combat to focus on training pathfinder aircrews and develop tactics, although its developmental work occasionally required it to fly combat missions. After V-E Day, the group returned to the United States and was inactivated.

The group became a reserve organization, serving as a bombardment unit from 1947-1949 and briefly as an airlift unit in 1952. It became a fighter unit in 1955. It was inactivated in 1957 when air force reserve units became troop carrier organizations, but was activated again in 1992.

== Mission ==
The mission of the 482d Operations Group is to train and equip reservists to respond to wartime and peacetime taskings as directed by higher headquarters. The group specifically trains for mobility, deployment, and employment.

== History ==
=== World War II ===
==== Background ====
VIII Bomber Command's early operations in 1942 and 1943 had shown it that weather conditions in the European Theater of Operations were such that visual bombing using the Norden bombsight was possible only during limited times. It became apparent that to conduct a successful bombing campaign, the command would need to have the capability of bombing through overcast. It determined to train crews to bomb using radars developed by the Royal Air Force (RAF), including H2S "Stinky" and AN/APS-15 "Mickey" radars. In addition, the 329th Bombardment Squadron conducted trials with the Gee navigation system. Following the RAF's example, Eighth Air Force determined to form a group with specially selected aircrews that would act as "Pathfinders", using radar-equipped bombers to lead each wing's bomber formation.

==== Pathfinder operations ====
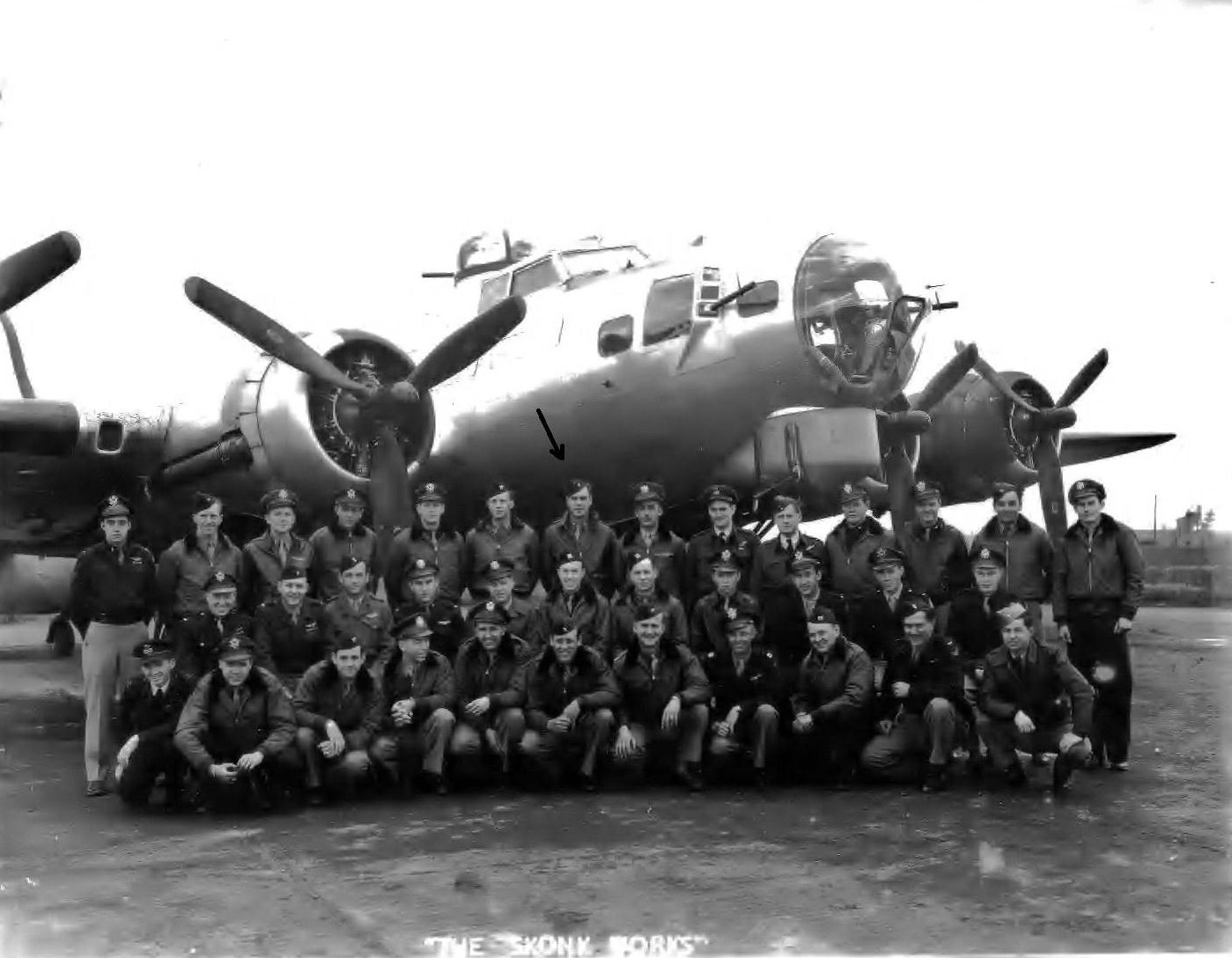
482d Bombardment Group crew at RAF Alconbury in 1944

The 482d Bombardment Group was formed at RAF Alconbury on 20 August 1943, with the 812th, 813th and 814th Bombardment Squadrons assigned. The 812th and 813th Squadrons flew Boeing B-17 Flying Fortresses, while the 814th was equipped with Consolidated B-24 Liberators. Its aircrews were specially selected from all VIII Bomber Command groups, particularly men who had been involved with the 329th Bombardment Squadron's test operations and the other units of the 92d Bombardment Group. Ground crews were drawn primarily from the 479th Antisubmarine Group, which had been disbanded. The group's first commander was Lt Col Baskin R. Lawrence, who had been training its cadre since 1 May. The 482d Group was one of two Eighth Air Force bomber groups activated overseas. (Note: The other group activated overseas by Eighth Air Force was the 25th Bombardment Group (Reconnaissance).) In addition to its combat mission of acting as Pathfinders, the group's mission was to continue the development of tactics and techniques for the use of radar navigation and bombing systems and training crews of other bomber units as Pathfinders.

The group flew its first mission on 27 September 1943 against port facilities at Emden, although it did not fly as a unit. Rather, its crews and airplanes dispersed to bases of other VIII Bomber Command units to provide lead aircraft for their formations. Although the 482d was assigned to the 1st Bombardment Division, it provided pathfinder services for units of 2d and 3d Bombardment Divisions as well. The group earned a Distinguished Unit Citation for an 11 January 1944 mission leading bombers to targets such as aircraft factories in central Germany. Although weather prevented effective fighter protection against enemy aircraft, the group bombed assigned targets and destroyed many enemy airplanes. During Big Week attacks it led raids on aircraft factories at Gotha, Braunschweig and Schweinfurt. On 4 March 1944, a crew from the 813th Squadron was leading Eighth Air Force's first B-17 raid on Berlin. Because they were in the lead, the 482d lays claim to being the first B-17 group to bomb Berlin.

==== Training and special operations ====
In addition to flying pathfinder missions, the group continued to train crews from other groups, with a goal of having a pathfinder qualified squadron in each bombardment group of VIII Bomber Command. In November 1943, the 36th and 406th Bombardment Squadrons, which had served in combat in Alaska early in the war, were formed at Alconbury. Like the 482d Group, these squadrons drew their cadre from the 479th Antisubmarine Group. In December, they were attached to the 482d and began training for and (starting in January 1944) performing Carpetbagger missions.

In February, the group was transferred to VIII Air Force Composite Command, which was responsible for Eighth Air Force training and special operations missions. The two Carpetbagger squadrons were spun off into a separate group. In early March, the group's mission shifted to concentrate on its training and development mission. Although the group was formally withdrawn from combat, it continued to fly occasional missions to test tactics and equipment, most notably on D-Day, when 18 of the group's crews performed missions leading other bombardment groups. In addition to training, it continued to undertake special operations. The group performed radar photographic mapping of parts of France, the Low Countries, and Germany for training and briefing combat crews. From August 1944 to April 1945, the 482d conducted 202 radar scope and "nickling" (propaganda leaflet) sorties over hostile territory without losing a single plane. It changed the "Pathfinder" in its name to "Heavy" in November 1944.

The group left England for the United States in May 1945. The aircraft departed between 27 and 30 May 1945. The ground echelon sailed on the RMS Queen Elizabeth from Gourock, Scotland on 24 June 1945. The group regrouped at Victorville Army Air Field, California on 5 July 1945, but was inactivated on 1 September 1945.

=== Early reserve operations ===
The group was redesignated the 482d Bombardment Group, Very Heavy and activated in the reserve at New Orleans Municipal Airport on 26 June 1947, although no operational squadrons were assigned until 9 September, when the 812th and 814th Bombardment Squadrons were activated at New Orleans. Later that month, the group added two squadrons when the 813th Bombardment Squadron was activated at Harding Field, Louisiana and the 6th Bombardment Squadron at Barksdale Field was transferred to group control.

Although nominally a bomber unit, it is not clear whether the group had any operational aircraft assigned, or if it was fully manned. The 482d was inactivated when Continental Air Command, which was responsible for training reserve and Air National Guard units, reorganized its reserve units under the wing base organization system in June 1949. President Truman's 1949 defense budget also required reductions in the number of groups in the Air Force, and the 482d was inactivated and not replaced as reserve flying operations at New Orleans Municipal Airport ceased.

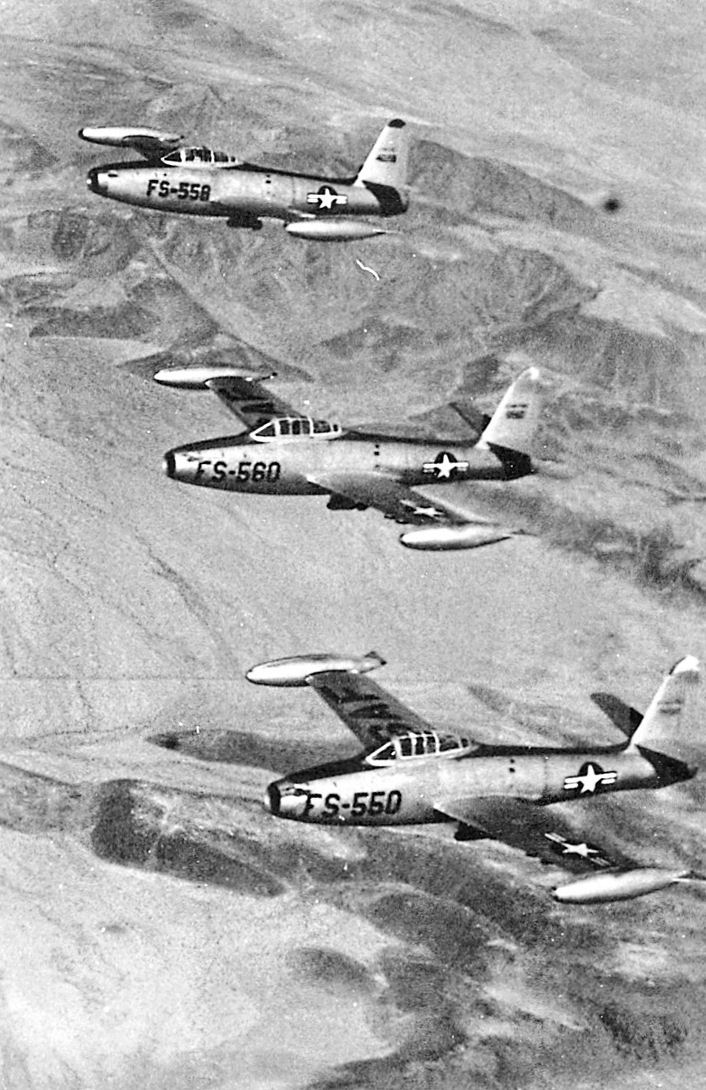
F-84Cs as flown by the group

All reserve combat organizations had been mobilized for the Korean War, and it was not until the summer of 1952 that reserve units again began receiving aircraft. The group was redesignated the 482th Troop Carrier Group and activated at Miami International Airport, Florida on 14 June 1952, when the 482d Troop Carrier Wing replaced the 906th Reserve Training Wing, which had supervised reserve operations there since 1951. The group trained with Curtiss C-46 Commandos under the supervision of the 2585th Air Force Reserve Training Center. In December 1953, the 435th Troop Carrier Wing at Miami was released from active duty and assumed the mission, personnel and equipment of the 482d Wing. In this reorganization, the 435th Troop Carrier Group took over the mission, personnel and aircraft of the 482d, which was inactivated. (Note: Although it had been mobilized in 1951, the 435th Wing remained in Miami as a training organization for C-46 crews deploying to the Far East. Ravenstein, p. 231. When it was released from active duty on 1 December 1952, its resources were taken over by the newly-activated 456th Troop Carrier Wing, while it took over those of the 482d. Ravenstein, pp. 231, 251, 268.)

In the early 1950s, there were six reserve pilot training wings with no mobilization mission. On 18 May 1955, they were discontinued and replaced by operational wings. In this reorganization, the 94th Tactical Reconnaissance Group at Dobbins Air Force Base, Georgia moved on paper to Scott Air Force Base to replace the 8711th Pilot Training Group. The 482d, now designated the 482d Fighter-Bomber Group, took over the 94th's personnel and equipment at Dobbins as a new reserve fighter unit.

The group initially flew Lockheed F-80 Shooting Star fighters, and trainers that it inherited from the 94th Wing. Later that year, it began to equip with the Republic F-84 Thunderjet. Despite its fighter bomber designation, its squadrons were designed to augment active duty interceptor squadrons capable of performing air defense missions. In 1957, the group began to replace its Thunderjets with North American F-86 Sabres. However, The Joint Chiefs of Staff were pressuring the Air Force to provide more wartime airlift. At the same time, about 150 Fairchild C-119 Flying Boxcars became available from the active force. Consequently, in November 1956 the Air Force directed Continental Air Command to convert three reserve fighter bomber wings to troop carrier units in 1957. Sabre training ended, and instead Fairchild C-119 Flying Boxcars arrived in October 1957. In November the wing was inactivated and its troop carrier assets were transferred to the 445th Troop Carrier Wing.

=== Fighter operations resume ===
From August 1992 controlled the 482d Fighter Wing's flying and aerial port operations. When Hurricane Andrew devastated Homestead later that month, flying operations moved to Wright-Patterson Air Force Base, Ohio from September to December 1992 and to MacDill Air Force Base, Florida from February 1993 until March 1994, before returning to Homestead.

== Lineage ==
- Established as the 482d Bombardment Group (Pathfinder) on 10 August 1943

Activated on 20 August 1943
Redesignated 482d Bombardment Group, Heavy on 11 November 1944
Inactivated on 1 September 1945

- Redesignated 482d Bombardment Group, Very Heavy on 3 June 1947

Activated in the reserve on 26 June 1947
Inactivated on 27 June 1949

- Redesignated 482d Troop Carrier Group, Medium on 26 May 1952

Activated in the reserve on 14 June 1952
Inactivated on 1 December 1952

- Redesignated 482d Fighter-Bomber Group on 12 August 1955

Activated in the reserve on 18 May 1955
Inactivated on 16 November 1957

- Redesignated: 482d Tactical Fighter Group on 31 July 1985 (Remained inactive)
- Redesignated: 482d Operations Group on 1 August 1992

Activated in the reserve on 1 August 1992

=== Assignments ===
- 1st Bombardment Division, 20 August 1943
- VIII Air Force Composite Command, 14 February 1944
- VIII Fighter Command, 1 October 1944
- 1st Air Division, 1 January 1945
- Army Air Forces Western Flying Training Command, 5 July-1 September 1945
- Tenth Air Force, 26 June 1947
- 307th Bombardment Wing (later 307th Air Division), 17 October 1947 – 27 June 1949
- 482d Troop Carrier Wing, 14 June - 1 December 1952
- 482d Fighter-Bomber Wing, 18 May 1955 – 16 November 1957
- 482d Fighter Wing, 1 August 1992 – present

=== Components ===
- 6th Bombardment Squadron: 30 September 1947 – 27 June 1949
- 36th Bombardment Squadron: attached 4 December 1943 – 27 February 1944
- 93rd Fighter Squadron: 1 August 1992 – present
- 406th Bombardment Squadron: attached 4 December 1943 – c. 21 February 1944
- 812th Bombardment Squadron (later 812th Troop Carrier Squadron, 812th Fighter-Bomber Squadron): 20 August 1943 – 1 September 1945; 9 September 1947 – 27 June 1949; 14 June - 1 December 1952; 18 May 1955 – 16 November 1957.
- 813th Bombardment Squadron (later 813th Troop Carrier Squadron, 813th Fighter-Bomber Squadron): 20 August 1943 – 1 September 1945; 24 September 1947 – 27 June 1949; 14 June - 1 December 1952; 8 July-16 November 1957
- 814th Bombardment Squadron (later 814th Troop Carrier Squadron): 20 August 1943 – 1 September 1945; 9 September 1947 – 27 June 1949; 14 June - 1 December 1952

=== Stations ===
- RAF Alconbury (AAF-102), England, 20 August 1943 – 21 May 1945
- Victorville Army Air Field, California, c. 5 July - 1 September 1945
- New Orleans Municipal Airport, Louisiana, 26 June 1947 – 27 June 1949
- Miami International Airport, Florida, 14 June-1 December 1952
- Dobbins Air Force Base, Georgia, 18 May 1955 – 16 November 1957
- Homestead Air Force Base (later Joint Air Reserve Base Homestead), Florida, 1 August 1992 – present

=== Aircraft ===
- Boeing B-17 Flying Fortress, 1943–1945
- Consolidated B-24 Liberator, 1943–1945
- Curtiss C-46 Commando, 1952
- Lockheed F-80 Shooting Star, 1955
- Republic F-84 Thunderstreak, 1955–1957
- North American T-28 Trojan, 1955–1957
- Lockheed T-33 T-Bird, 1955–1957
- North American F-86 Sabre, 1957
- Fairchild C-119 Flying Boxcar, 1957
- McDonnell F-4 Phantom II, 1978–1989
- General Dynamics F-16 Fighting Falcon, 1989–present

=== Awards and campaigns ===
Award streamer	Award	Dates	Notes
	Distinguished Unit Citation	11 January 1944	Germany, 482d Bombardment Group
	Air Force Outstanding Unit Award	1 August 1992-1 October 1993	482d Operations Group
	Air Force Outstanding Unit Award	1 November 1993-30 August 1995	482d Operations Group
	Air Force Outstanding Unit Award	1 October 1999-30 September 2001	482d Operations Group
	Air Force Outstanding Unit Award	1 October 2004-30 September 2006	482d Operations Group
	Air Force Outstanding Unit Award	1 October 2006-30 September 2008	482d Operations Group
	Air Force Outstanding Unit Award	1 October 2008-30 September 2009	482d Operations Group
	Air Force Outstanding Unit Award	1 October 2009-30 September 2010	482d Operations Group

Campaign Streamer	Campaign	Dates	Notes
	Air Offensive, Europe	20 August 1943 – 5 June 1944	482d Bombardment Group
	Normandy	6 June 1944 – 24 July 1944	482d Bombardment Group
	Northern France	25 July 1944 – 14 September 1944	482d Bombardment Group
	Rhineland	15 September 1944 – 21 March 1945	482d Bombardment Group
	Central Europe	22 March 1944 – 21 May 1945	482d Bombardment Group

== See also ==
- Pathfinder (RAF)
