= 814th Troop Carrier Squadron =

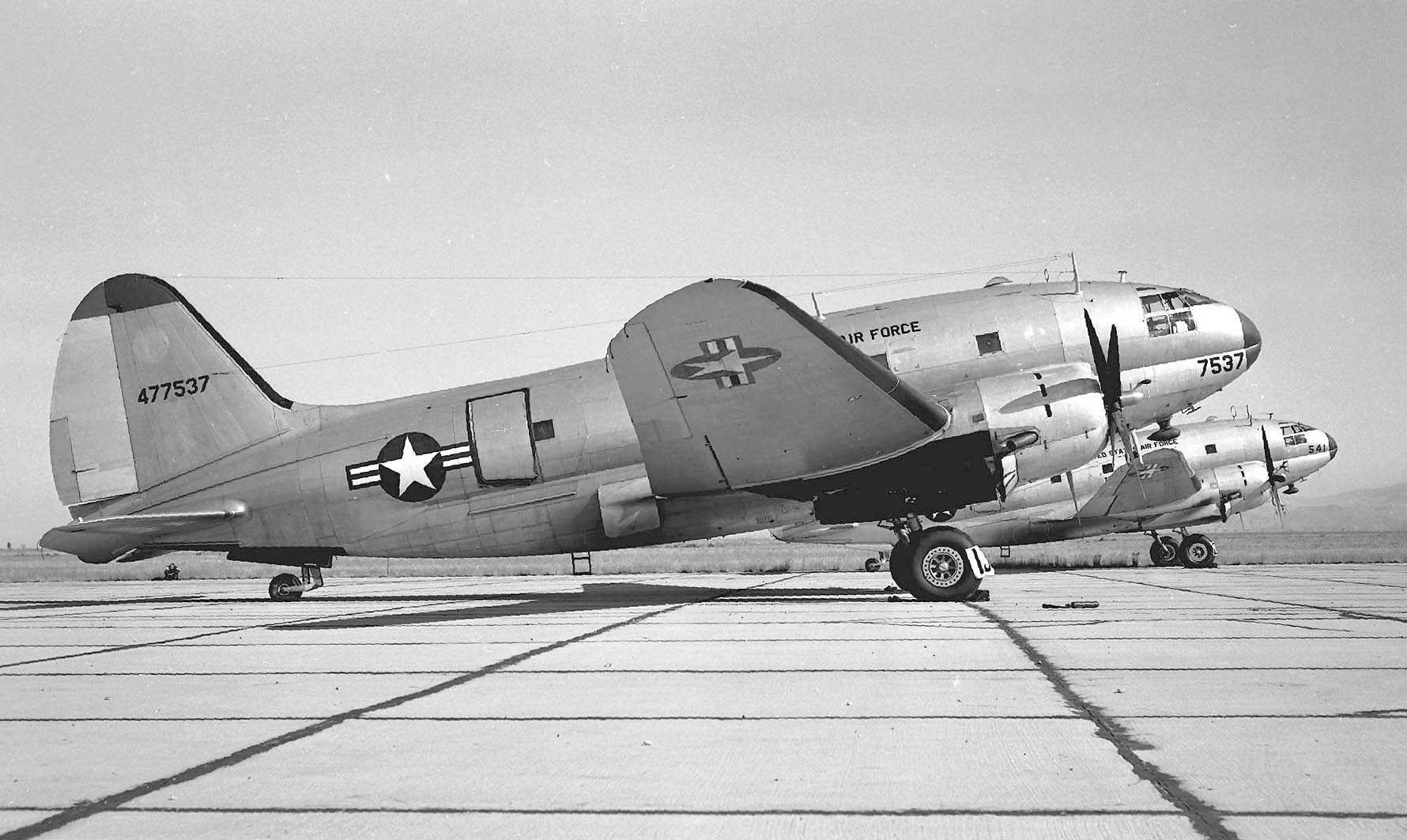
- C-46 Commando, last plane flown by the squadron
- Active: 1943–1945; 1947–1949; 1952
- Country: United States
- Branch: United States Air Force
- Role: Airlift
- Part of: Continental Air Command
- Engagements: European Theater of Operations
- Decorations: Distinguished Unit Citation

Insignia
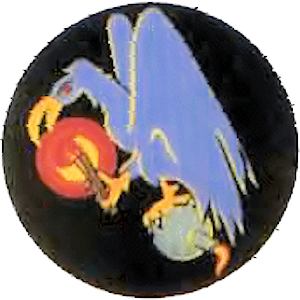
- 814th Troop Carrier Squadron emblem (Note: Approved 16 October 1944. Description: On a black disc, a caricatured light purple vulture with yellow orange beak and feet, highlighted yellow, holding a brown fagot in the right foot, inflamed of yellow orange and dark red, having glow formed by concentric bands of yellow orange and dark red and grasping a gray fire bomb, fired proper in the left foot.)

The 814th Troop Carrier Squadron is an inactive United States Air Force unit. Its last assignment was with 482d Troop Carrier Group stationed at Miami International Airport, Florida.

During World War II, the squadron was activated in England as the 814th Bombardment Squadron (Pathfinder). Its Consolidated B-24 Liberator aircraft were equipped with first generation radars to guide other bombardment units to targets obscured by cloud cover over Occupied Europe and Nazi Germany, earning a Distinguished Unit Citation in January 1944. In March 1944, it was removed from combat to focus on training pathfinder aircrews and develop tactics, although its developmental work occasionally required it to fly combat missions. After V-E Day, the squadron returned to the United States and was inactivated.

The squadron became a reserve organization, serving as a bombardment unit from 1947 to 1949 and briefly as an airlift unit in 1952.

== History ==
=== World War II ===
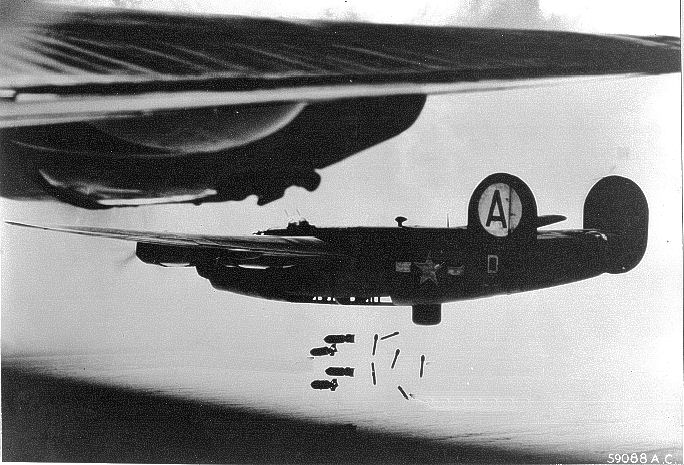
Squadron B-24 on a bombing run. Note extended radome aft of the open bomb bay.

VIII Bomber Command's early operations in 1942 and 1943 had shown it that weather conditions in the European Theater of Operations were such that to conduct a successful bombing campaign, the command would need to have the capability of bombing through overcast. Following the Royal Air Force's example, Eighth Air Force formed a group with specially selected aircrews that would act as "Pathfinders", using radar-equipped bombers to lead each wing's bomber formation. The squadron was activated as the 814th Bombardment Squadron, the Consolidated B-24 Liberator squadron of the 482d Bombardment Group on 20 August 1943. (Note: The group also had two squadrons flying Boeing B-17 Flying Fortresses. Maurer, Combat Squadrons, pp. 763–765.)

Squadron aircrews were specially selected from all VIII Bomber Command Liberator groups. In addition to its combat mission of acting as Pathfinders, the squadron's mission was to continue the development of tactics and techniques for the use of radar navigation and bombing systems and training crews of other bomber units as Pathfinders. The squadron flew its first mission on 27 September 1943 against port facilities at Emden, although it did not fly as a unit. Rather, its crews and airplanes dispersed to bases of 2d Bombardment Division to lead other group formations. The squadron earned a Distinguished Unit Citation for an 11 January 1944 mission leading bombers to targets such as aircraft factories in central Germany. Although weather prevented effective fighter protection against enemy aircraft, the group bombed assigned targets and destroyed many enemy airplanes. During Big Week attacks it led raids on aircraft factories at Gotha, Braunschweig and Schweinfurt.

In addition to flying pathfinder missions, the squadron trained crews from other groups of VIII Bomber Command. Although it was formally withdrawn from combat in March 1944, it continued to fly occasional missions to test tactics and equipment. In addition, the squadron performed radar photographic mapping of parts of France, the Low Countries, and Germany for training and briefing combat crews. It changed the "Pathfinder" in its name to "Heavy" in November 1944.

The squadron's aircraft left England for the United States between 27 and 30 May 1945. The ground echelon sailed on the RMS Queen Elizabeth from Gourock, Scotland on 24 June 1945. The squadron regrouped at Victorville Army Air Field, California on 5 July 1945, but was inactivated on 1 September 1945.

=== Reserve operations ===
The squadron was redesignated the 814th Bombardment Squadron, Very Heavy and activated in the reserve at New Orleans Municipal Airport on 9 September 1947. Although nominally a bomber unit, it is not clear whether the squadron had any operational aircraft assigned, or if it was fully manned. Continental Air Command, which was responsible for training reserve and Air National Guard units, reorganized its reserve units under the wing base organization system in June 1949. President Truman's 1949 defense budget also required reductions in the number of units in the Air Force, so reserve flying operations at New Orleans Municipal Airport ceased and the 814th was inactivated in this reorganization.

All reserve combat organizations had been mobilized for the Korean War, and it was not until the summer of 1952 that reserve units again began receiving aircraft. The squadron was redesignated the 814th Troop Carrier Squadron and activated at Miami International Airport, Florida on 14 June 1952, when the 482d Troop Carrier Wing replaced the 906th Reserve Training Wing, which had supervised reserve operations there since 1951. The squadron trained with Curtiss C-46 Commandos under the supervision of the 2585th Air Force Reserve Training Center. In December 1953, the 435th Troop Carrier Wing at Miami was released from active duty and assumed the mission, personnel and equipment of the 482d Wing. In this reorganization, the 78th Troop Carrier Squadron took over the mission, personnel and aircraft of the 814th, which was inactivated. (Note: Although it had been mobilized in 1951, the 435th Wing remained in Miami as a training organization for C-46 crews deploying to the Far East. Ravenstein, p. 231. When it was released from active duty on 1 December 1952, its resources were taken over by the newly-activated 456th Troop Carrier Wing, while it took over those of the 482d. Ravenstein, pp. 231, 251, 268.)

== Lineage ==
- Constituted as the 814th Bombardment Squadron (Pathfinder) on 10 August 1943

Activated on 20 August 1943
Redesignated 814th Bombardment Squadron, Heavy on 11 November 1944
Inactivated on 1 September 1945

- Redesignated 814th Bombardment Squadron, Very Heavy on 13 August 1947

Activated in the reserve on 9 September 1947
Inactivated on 27 June 1949

- Redesignated 814th Troop Carrier Squadron, Medium on 26 May 1952

Activated in the reserve on 14 June 1952
Inactivated on 1 December 1952

=== Assignments ===
- 482d Bombardment Group, 20 August 1943 – 1 September 1945
- 482d Bombardment Group, 24 September 1947 – 27 June 1949
- 482d Troop Carrier Group, 14 June-1 December 1952

=== Stations ===
- RAF Alconbury, England, 20 August 1943-June 1945
- Victorville Army Air Field, California, July-1 September 1945
- Harding Field, Louisiana, 24 September 1947 – 27 June 1949
- Miami International Airport, Florida, 14 June-1 December 1952

=== Aircraft ===
- Consolidated B-24 Liberator, 1943–1945
- Curtiss C-46 Commando, 1952

=== Awards and campaigns ===
Award streamer	Award	Dates	Notes
	Distinguished Unit Citation	11 January 1944	Germany, 814th Bombardment Squadron

Campaign Streamer	Campaign	Dates	Notes
	Air Offensive, Europe	20 August 1943 – 5 June 1944	814th Bombardment Squadron
	Normandy	6 June 1944 – 24 July 1944	814th Bombardment Squadron
	Northern France	25 July 1944 – 14 September 1944	814th Bombardment Squadron
	Rhineland	15 September 1944 – 21 March 1945	814th Bombardment Squadron
	Central Europe	22 March 1944 – 21 May 1945	814th Bombardment Squadron
