= 75th Troop Carrier Squadron =

75th Troop Carrier Squadron

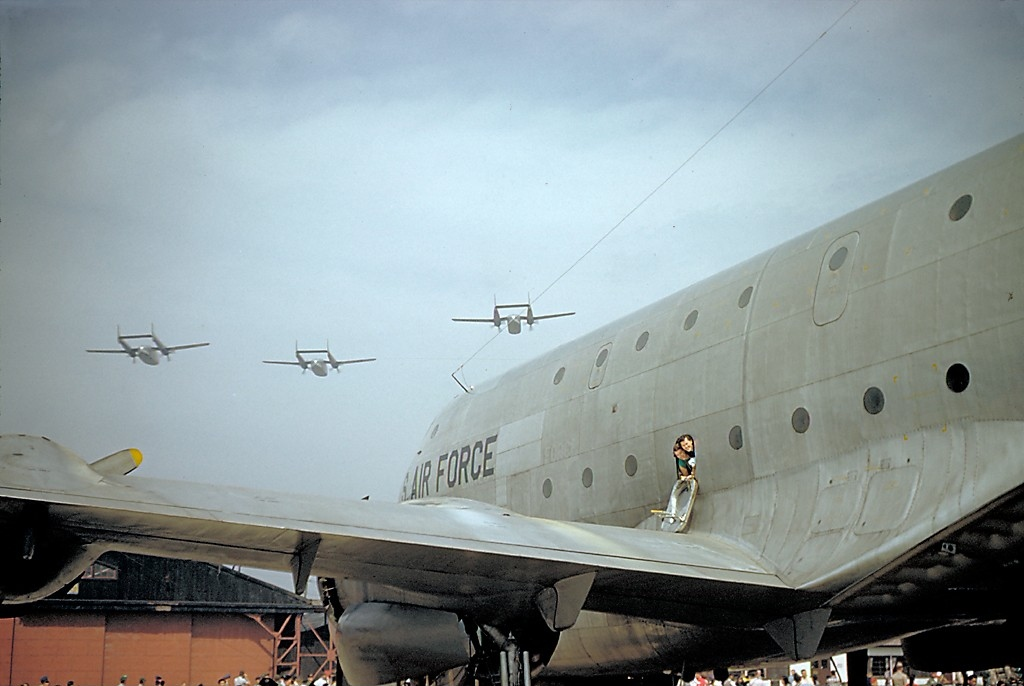
- C-119 Flying Boxcars from Ashiya AB perform a flyover on Armed Forces Day 1955
- Active: 1943–1949; 1953–1957
- Country: United States
- Branch: United States Air Force
- Role: Tactical Airlift
- Part of: Pacific Air Forces
- Engagements: European Theater of Operations
- Decorations: Distinguished Unit Citation

Insignia
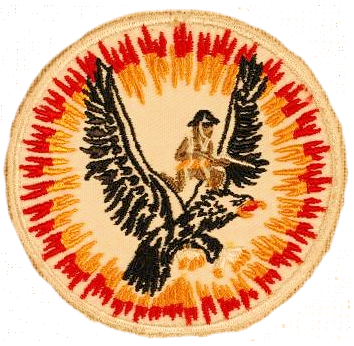
- Patch with 75th Troop Carrier Squadron emblem (approved 6 September 1943)

The 75th Troop Carrier Squadron is an inactive United States Air Force unit. It was last assigned to the 316th Troop Carrier Group at Ashiya Air Base, Japan, where it was inactivated on 18 June 1957.

The unit was first activated as a Douglas C-47 Skytrain transport unit that saw combat with the 435th Troop Carrier Group in Western Europe. The squadron flew paratroopers on airborne assaults on Normandy (Operation Overlord); Southern France (Operation Dragoon); the Netherlands (Operation Market Garden), and Germany (Operation Varsity). It also flew combat resupply missions in the relief of Bastogne in 1945. The 75th was awarded a Distinguished Unit Citation for its actions during the Normandy invasion.

Following VE Day, the 75th returned to the United States, where it was reassigned to the 316th Group. It participated in joint airborne training, glider training and in exercises with Curtiss C-46 Commandos and Fairchild C-82 Packets until 1949 when it was inactivated as a result of budget reductions.

The squadron was activated again in December 1952 with Fairchild C-119 Flying Boxcars and moved on paper to Japan in November 1954 when its parent 316th Troop Carrier Group replaced the 314th Troop Carrier Group at Ashiya.

== History ==
=== World War II ===
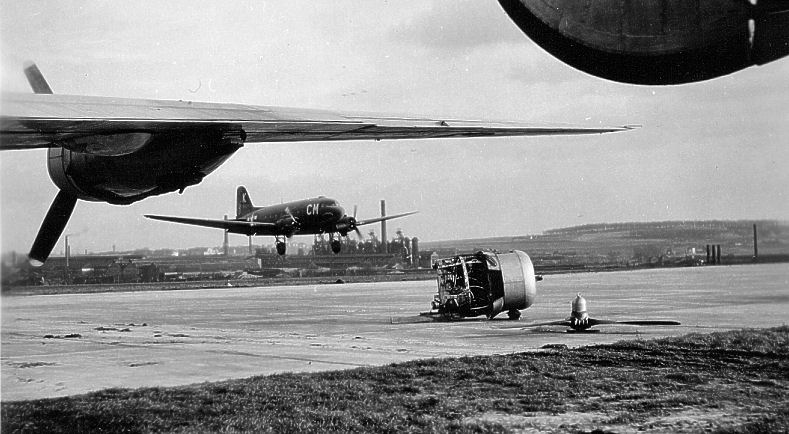
78th Troop Carrier Squadron C-47 landing

The squadron was first activated at Bowman Field, Kentucky in February 1943, as one of the original squadrons of the 435th Troop Carrier Group. The group used Douglas C-47 Skytrains and Douglas C-53 Skytrooopers in preparing for duty overseas with Ninth Air Force.

The 75th left the United States in October 1943, arriving at RAF Langar (AAF-490), England, in early November. In January 1944, the 75th TCS along with the rest of the 435th Troop Carrier Group moved to RAF Welford (AAF-474). While in the ETO the 75th TCS wore first the Sqdn code "SH" and then in late Spring 1944, it was changed to "CK." After its arrival in the UK, the Squadron began training for participation in the airborne operation over Normandy. The squadron flew its first combat missions on D-Day by dropping paratroopers of 101st Airborne Division near Cherbourg-en-Cotentin. The unit towed Waco CG-4A and Airspeed Horsa gliders carrying reinforcements to the same location that afternoon and on the following morning. The squadron received a Distinguished Unit Citation for its part in Operation Overlord, the Normandy invasion.

The squadron began transport services following the landings in France and intermittently engaged in missions of this type until V-E Day In these operations the 75th hauled supplies such as serum, blood plasma, radar sets, clothing, rations, and ammunition. It also evacuated wounded personnel to Allied hospitals.

The squadron interrupted these supply and evacuation missions to train for and participate in three major airborne assaults. It was part of a detachment of three squadrons from the 435th Group that moved to Tarquinia Airfield, Italy in July 1944 for Operation Dragoon, the invasion of Southern France. The detachment dropped paratroopers over the assault area on 15 August and also released gliders carrying troops and equipment such as jeeps, guns, and ammunition. The following day it flew a resupply mission over France, then transported supplies to bases in Italy before returning to England at the end of the month.

In September 1944 the squadron participated in Operation Market Garden the unsuccessful airborne operation intended to seize bridges across the Meuse River in the Netherlands, dropping paratroops of the 82d and 101st Airborne Divisions and releasing gliders carrying reinforcements. During the Battle of the Bulge, the unit delivered supplies to isolated combat positions of the 101st Airborne and 7th Armored Divisions in Bastogne and Marcouray, Belgium.

The unit moved to Bretigny Airfield, France in February 1945 to prepare for Operation Varsity, the airborne assault across the Rhine River. Each squadron aircraft participating in this operation towed two gliders transporting troops and equipment to the east bank of the Rhine near Wesel on 24 March. The unit then flew resupply missions to Germany in support of ground forces.

The squadron transported supplies to occupation forces in Germany and evacuated Allied prisoners of war after V-E Day. The squadron and the 435th Group returned to the United States in August and the group was inactivated on 15 November 1945.

=== Post war troop carrier operations ===
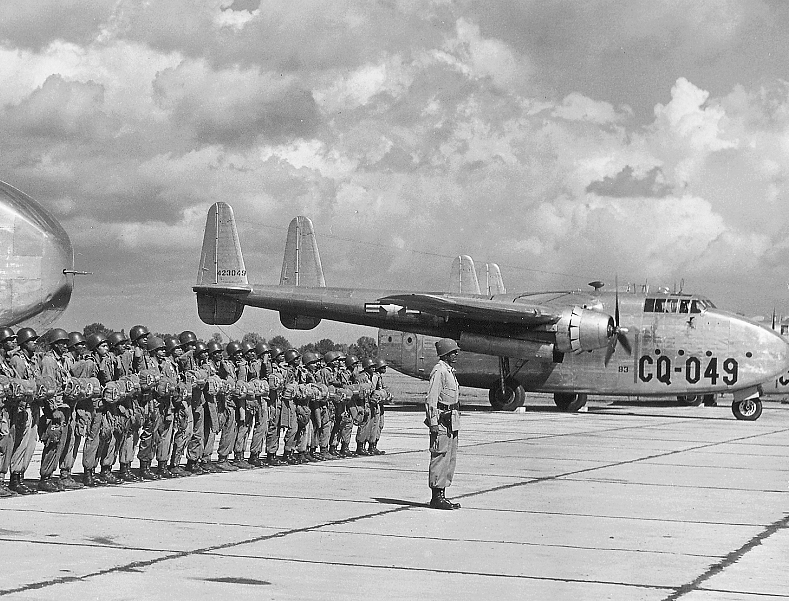
C-82s of the 316th Troop Carrier Group

Shortly after the 435th Troop Carrier Group was inactivated, the squadron was moved to Lawson Field, Georgia, where it became part of the 316th Troop Carrier Group. The squadron initially operated Curtiss C-46 Commandos with the 316th. By 1947 it had converted to Fairchild C-82 Packet transports. With both aircraft it participated in joint airborne training, glider training and in exercises. The squadron also ferried aircraft to overseas locations.

President Truman's reduced 1949 defense budget required reductions in the number of units in the Air Force. As a result, the squadron's parent 316th Troop Carrier Wing (Note: The 316th Troop Carrier Wing had been formed in 1947 as part of the Air Force's wing base organization, which placed the 316th Troop Carrier Group and the various units supporting it under a single wing organization. Ravenstein, pp. 10 (Explanatory Notes), 165–166) was inactivated in October, while its 316th Group moved to Smyrna Air Force Base, Tennessee in November, where it was absorbed into another wing. Shortly after arriving at Smyrna, the group was reduced to two squadrons and the 75th was inactivated.

=== Troop carrier operations in Japan ===
The squadron was reactivated in December 1952 at Smyrna (now Sewart Air Force Base) as the expansion of the Air Force during the Korean War permitted the 316th Group to expand to three squadrons of Fairchild C-119 Flying Boxcars. (Note: The group also had a squadron equipped with Chase YC-122 Avitrucs, experimenting with assault airlift techniques.)

In November 1954, the squadron moved without personnel or equipment to Ashiya Air Base, Japan, where it assumed the aircraft, personnel and mission of the 62d Troop Carrier Squadron. (Note: The move of the 316th Group and its C-119 squadrons was essentially a swap of numbers with the 314th Troop Carrier Group, which simultaneously moved without personnel or equipment from Ashiya to Sewart. The 314th Group had deployed to Japan for the Korean War in 1950, while its parent 314th Troop Carrier Wing had remained behind at Sewart, with other groups attached as its operational elements. Ravenstein, pp. 161–163, Maurer, Combat Units, pp. 190–192) It remained in Japan and performed theater airlift missions primarily to Japan, Okinawa, Philippines and South Korea until it was inactivated in 1957.

== Lineage ==
- Constituted as the 75th Troop Carrier Squadron on 30 January 1943

Activated on 25 February 1943
Redesignated 75th Troop Carrier Squadron, Medium on 23 June 1948
Inactivated on 22 November 1949

- Activated on 20 December 1952

Inactivated on 18 June 1957

=== Assignments ===
- 435th Troop Carrier Group, 25 February 1943
- IX Troop Carrier Command, 15 November 1945
- 316th Troop Carrier Group, 11 December 1945 – 22 November 1949
- 316th Troop Carrier Group, 20 December 1952 – 18 June 1957

=== Stations ===
- Bowman Field, Kentucky, 25 February 1943
- Sedalia Army Air Field, Missouri, 4 May 1943
- Pope Field, North Carolina, 2 July 1943
- Baer Field, Indiana, 9–13 October 1943
- RAF Langar (AAF-490), England, 4 November 1943
- RAF Welford (AAF-474), England, January 1944 (detachment operated from Tarquinia Airfield, Italy, 20 July – 23 August 1944 )
- Bretigny Airfield (A-48), France, 19 February – June 1945
- Baer Field, Indiana, 5 August 1945
- Kellogg Field, Michigan, 23 August 1945
- Baer Field, Indiana, 18 September 1945
- Lawson Field, Georgia, 1 December 1945
- Greenville Army Air Base (later Greenville Air Force Base), South Carolina, 14 July 1947
- Smyrna Air Force Base, Tennessee, 4–22 November 1949
- Sewart Air Force Base, Tennessee, 20 December 1952
- Ashiya Air Base, Japan, 15 November 1954 – 18 June 1957

=== Aircraft ===
- Douglas C-53 Skytrooper (1943–1945)
- Douglas C-47 Skytrain (1943–1945)
- Waco CG-4 (1943–1945)
- Airspeed Horsa (1943–1945)
- Curtiss C-46 Commando, 1945–1947
- Fairchild C-82 Packet, 1946–1949
- Fairchild C-119 Flying Boxcar 1952–1957

== See also ==
- List of Douglas C-47 Skytrain operators
