= 78th Air Refueling Squadron =

Inactive US Air Force unit

78th Air Refueling Squadron

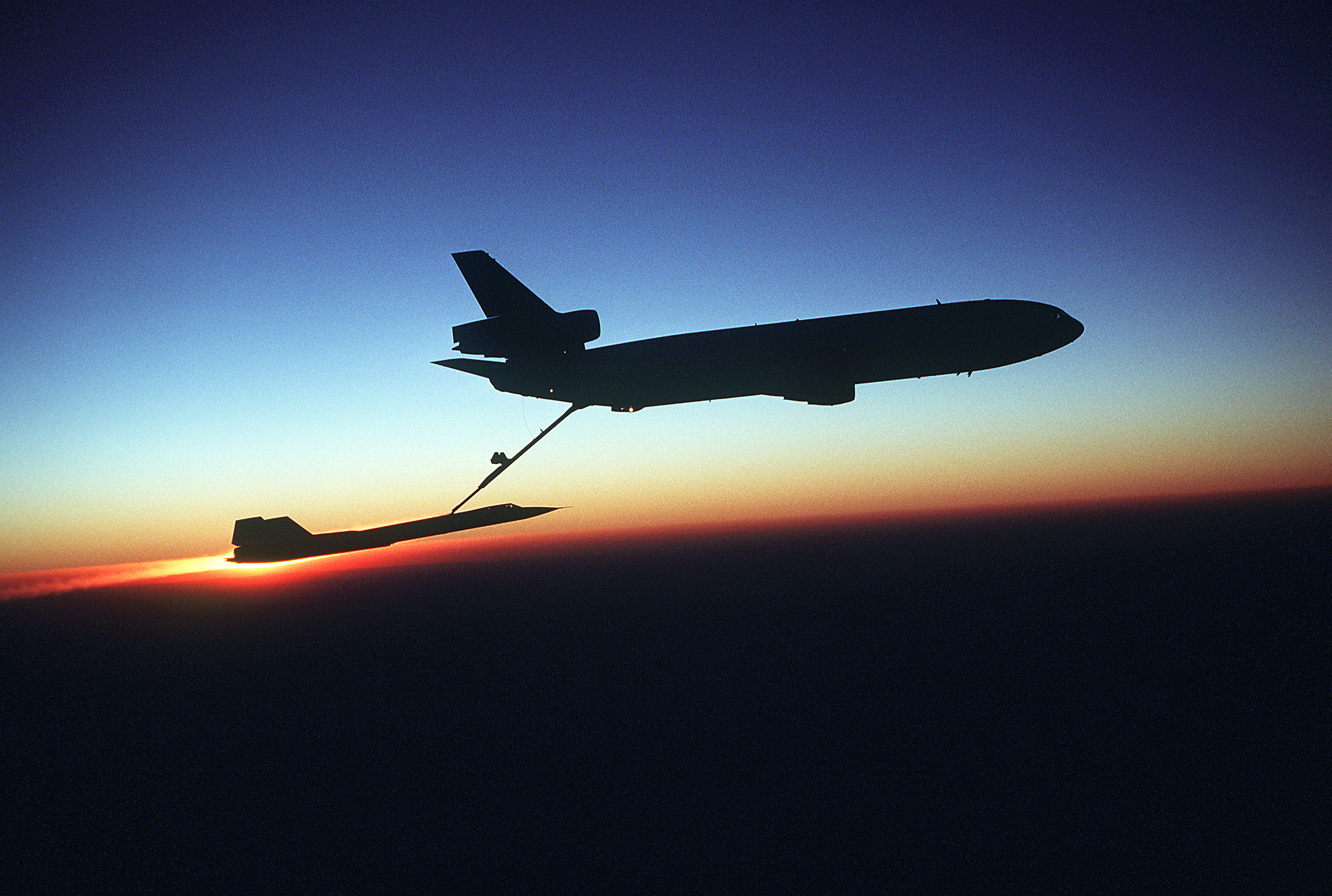
- A squadron KC-10 Extender refueling an SR-71 Blackbird aircraft during testing
- Active: 1943–1945; 1947–1952; 1952–1954; 1955–1957; 1959–1973; 1981–present
- Country: United States
- Branch: United States Air Force
- Role: Aerial refueling
- Part of: Air Force Reserve Command
- Garrison/HQ: McGuire Air Force Base
- Nickname(s): The Captain Shreve Squadron
- Motto(s): "Steam On"
- Engagements: Operation Overlord; Operation Dragoon; Operation Market Garden; Operation Varsity
- Decorations: Distinguished Unit Citation; Air Force Outstanding Unit Award; RVGC w/ Palm

Insignia
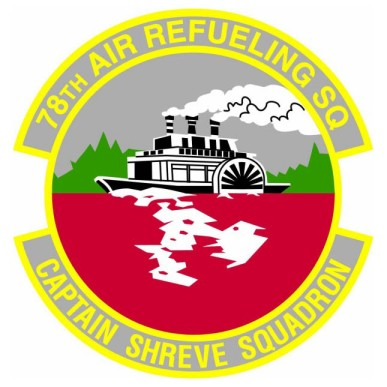
- 78th Air Refueling Squadron emblem (approved 17 August 1984)

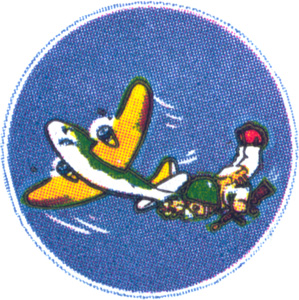
- 78th Troop Carrier Squadron emblem (approved 26 October 1943)

The 78th Air Refueling Squadron is an inactive squadron of the United States Air Force Reserve Command. It was last assigned to the 514th Air Mobility Wing at McGuire Air Force Base, New Jersey. It operated the KC-46A Pegasus aircraft conducting aerial refueling missions as a reserve associate of the 305th Air Mobility Wing.

The unit was first activated as a Douglas C-47 Skytrain transport unit that saw combat with the 435th Troop Carrier Group in Western Europe. The squadron flew paratroopers on airborne assaults on Normandy (Operation Overlord); Southern France (Operation Dragoon); the Netherlands (Operation Market Garden), and Germany (Operation Varsity). It also flew combat resupply missions in the relief of Bastogne in 1945. The 78th was awarded a Distinguished Unit Citation for its actions during the Normandy invasion.

The squadron was activated in the reserve in 1947. It was called to active duty in March 1951 for the Korean War, serving at its home station, Miami International Airport. It returned to reserve duty in December 1952, but it was activated in 1954. The squadron was activated again in 1955 as part of a program to improve recruiting by spreading reserve units to smaller population centers.

== History ==
=== World War II ===
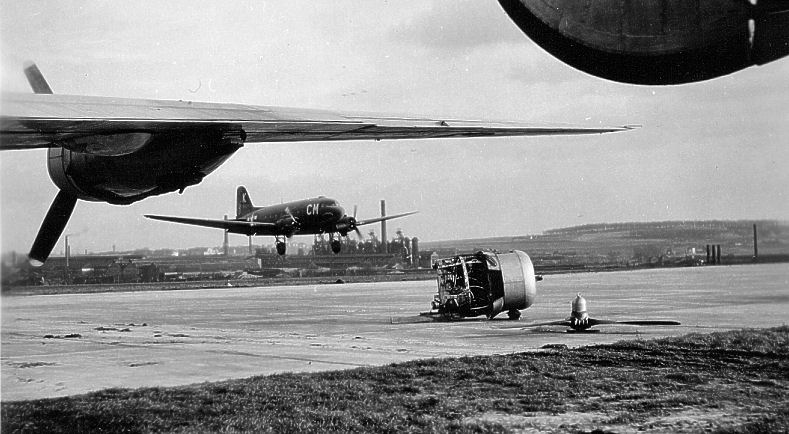
435th Troop Carrier Group C-47 landing

The squadron was first activated at Bowman Field, Kentucky in February 1943, as one of the original squadrons of the 435th Troop Carrier Group. The group used Douglas C-47 Skytrains and Douglas C-53 Skytrooopers in preparing for duty overseas with Ninth Air Force.

The 78th left the United States in October 1943, arriving at RAF Langar, England, in early November. On arrival, it began training for participation in the airborne operation over Normandy. The squadron flew its first combat missions on D-Day by dropping paratroopers of 101st Airborne Division near Cherbourg Naval Base. The unit towed Waco CG-4A and Airspeed Horsa gliders carrying reinforcements to the same location that afternoon and on the following morning. The squadron received a Distinguished Unit Citation for its part in Operation Overlord, the Normandy invasion.

The squadron began transport services following the landings in France and intermittently engaged in missions of this type until V-E Day In these operations the 78th hauled supplies such as serum, blood plasma, radar sets, clothing, rations, and ammunition. It also evacuated wounded personnel to Allied hospitals.

The squadron interrupted these supply and evacuation missions to train for and participate in three major airborne assaults. It was part of a detachment of three squadrons from the 435th Group that moved to Tarquinia Airfield, Italy in July 1944 for Operation Dragoon, the invasion of Southern France. The detachment dropped paratroopers over the assault area on 15 August and also released gliders carrying troops and equipment such as jeeps, guns, and ammunition. The following day it flew a resupply mission over France, then transported supplies to bases in Italy before returning to England at the end of the month.

In September 1944 the squadron participated in Operation Market Garden the unsuccessful airborne operation intended to seize bridges across the Meuse River in the Netherlands, dropping paratroops of the 82d and 101st Airborne Divisions and releasing gliders carrying reinforcements. During the Battle of the Bulge, the unit delivered supplies to isolated combat positions of the 101st Airborne and 7th Armored Divisions in Bastogne and Marcouray, Belgium.

The unit moved to Bretigny Airfield, France in February 1945 to prepare for Operation Varsity, the airborne assault across the Rhine River. Each squadron aircraft participating in this operation towed two gliders transporting troops and equipment to the east bank of the Rhine near Wesel on 24 March. The unit then flew resupply missions to Germany in support of ground forces.

The squadron transported supplies to occupation forces in Germany and evacuated Allied prisoners of war after V-E Day. The squadron and the 435th Group returned to the United States in August and the group was inactivated on 15 November 1945.

=== Reserve troop carrier operations ===
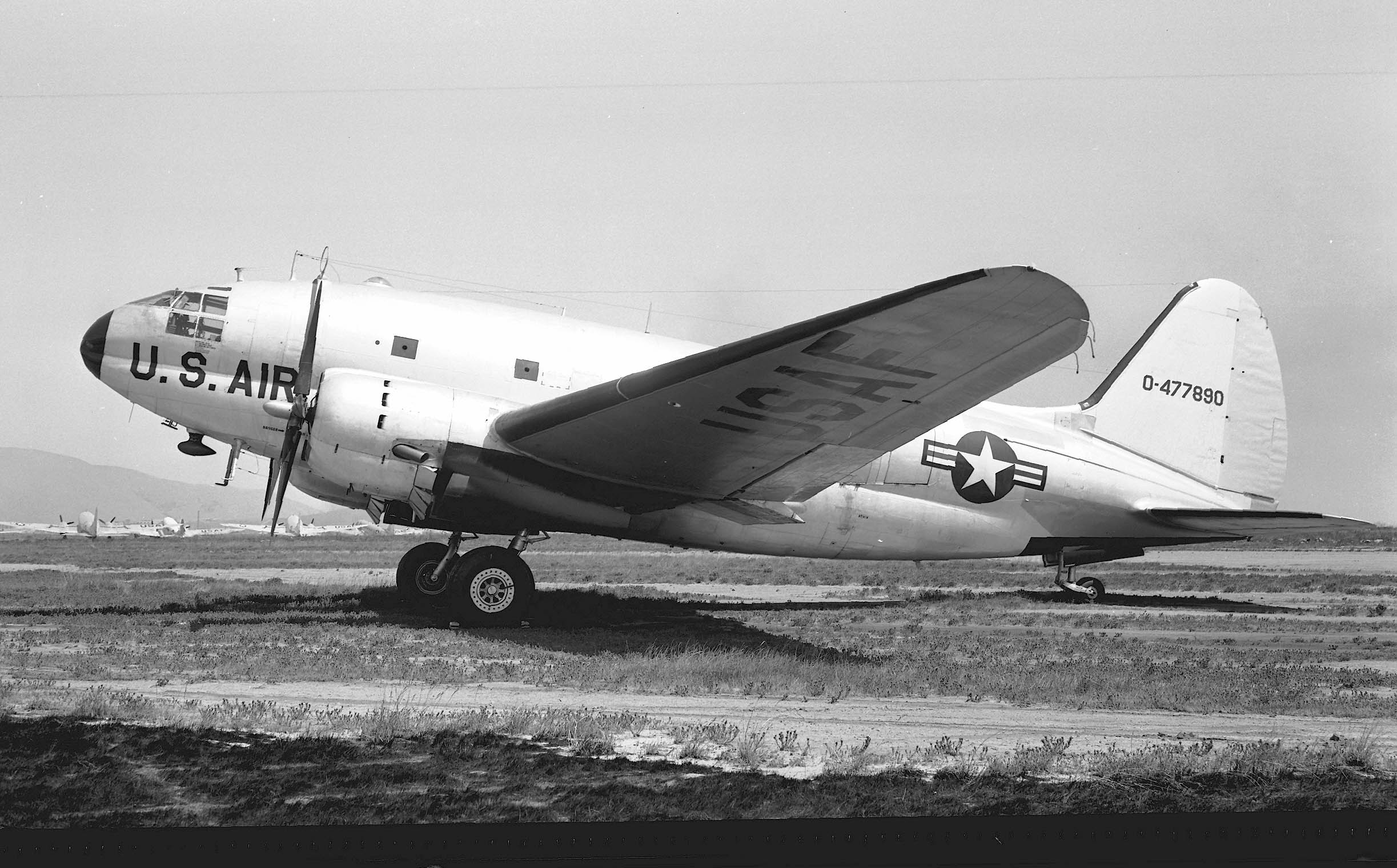
Curtiss C-46D

The squadron was once again activated as a reserve unit under Air Defense Command at Imeson Field, Florida on 17 July 1947. It was again assigned to the 435th Troop Carrier Group, located at Morrison Field, Florida. The squadron was nominally a Curtiss C-46 Commando unit, but it is not clear to what extent it was equipped with tactical aircraft while at Imeson.

In June 1949, Continental Air Command, which had assumed the responsibility for training reserve units from Air Defense Command in 1948, reorganized its reserve units under the wing base organization system. As part of this reorganization and unit reductions required by President Truman's reduced 1949 defense budget, the 435th Group and its squadrons moved to Miami International Airport, where it was assigned to the newly formed 435th Troop Carrier Wing and formed its cadre from elements of the inactivating 100th Bombardment Group. Air Force flying operations at Imeson came to a temporary end. The squadron was manned at only 25% of the strength of a regular unit.

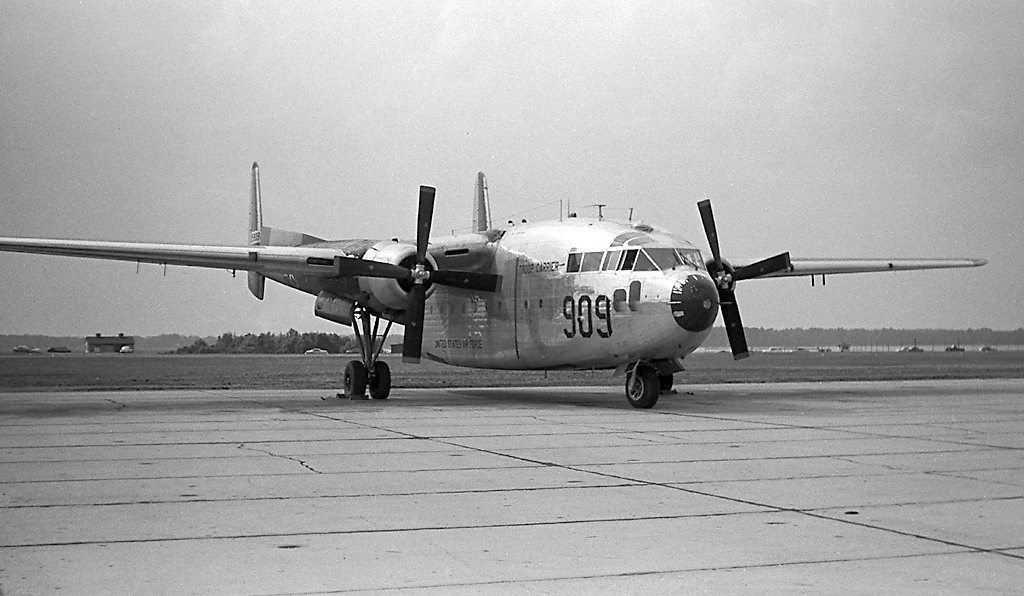
Fairchild C-119G Flying Boxcar

At Miami, the squadron trained with C-46s under the supervision of the active duty 2585th Air Force Reserve Training Center. The squadron was ordered into active service in March 1951 as a result of the Korean War. Along with other reserve troop carrier units called to active duty, it formed Tactical Air Command's Eighteenth Air Force. The squadron's initial function was to train C-46 aircrews for service in Korea. The 78th also trained with Fairchild C-119 Flying Boxcars. Although it remained at Miami, the unit deployed twice while on active duty: to Laurinburg-Maxton Airport, North Carolina from 21 July until 1 September 1951 and to Grenier Air Force Base, New Hampshire from 2 January to 3 March 1952. It was relieved from active duty and inactivated on 1 December 1952 and its mission, personnel and equipment were transferred to the regular 746th Troop Carrier Squadron, which was activated the same day.

The squadron was activated as a reserve unit the same day at the same station, but with the personnel and equipment of the inactivating 814th Troop Carrier Squadron. In the reserve, the squadron once again flew the Curtiss Commandos.

=== Reserve airlift and air refueling operations ===
August 1962 – March 1972, during which times it often augmented Military Airlift Command's strategic airlift operations worldwide and took part in domestic training exercises. The squadron also served in an active status from, March 1951 – December 1952 and October 1961 – August 1962. Between April 1972 and October 1973, it performed a special operations role. In November 1981, the 78th began strategic aerial refueling and airlift operations. In December 1989 it refueled aircraft on way to Panama during Operation Just Cause. During Operation Desert Shield in 1990, its crews refueled more than a hundred aircraft on their way from the United States to the Persian Gulf area and delivered passengers and cargo. On September 11, 2001 crews conducting early morning training missions responded to the attacks on the World Trade Center and the Pentagon. With the Global War on Terrorism commencing, the 78th had crews deployed to US Central Command almost continuously from 2001 to 2022. 78th crews refueled thousands of allied aircraft offloading millions of pounds of fuel during Operation Enduring Freedom, Operation Iraqi Freedom, Operation New Dawn, Operation Inherent Resolve, Operation Spartan Shield, and Operation Freedoms Sentinel. In August 2022 during the United States operational withdrawal from Afghanistan, deployed crews from the 78th were over head providing fuel during Operation Allies Refuge, which was also the last deployment of the KC-10A by the 78th. In September 2022, the 78th Air Refueling Squadron was selected and began the transition from flying the KC-10A Extender to the KC-46A Pegasus, ending the 78th's strategic air refueling mission. Shortly after the 78th Air Refueling Squadron was selected for inactivation and on 7 September 2024, the squadrons 30 year history at Joint Base McGure-Dix-Lakehurst came to an end.

=== Awards and campaigns ===
Award streamer	Award	Dates	Notes
	Distinguished Unit Citation	5 June 1944 to 7 June 1944	78th Troop Carrier Squadron
	Air Force Outstanding Unit Award	1 August 1967 to 25 October 1968	78th Military Airlift Squadron
	Air Force Outstanding Unit Award	1 October 1995 to 30 September 1997	78th Air Refueling Squadron
	Air Force Outstanding Unit Award	1 October 1999 to 30 September 2001	78th Air Refueling Squadron
	Air Force Outstanding Unit Award	1 October 2004 to 30 September 2006	78th Air Refueling Squadron
	Air Force Outstanding Unit Award	1 October 2006 to 31 August 2007	78th Air Refueling Squadron
	Air Force Outstanding Unit Award	1 January 2017 to 31 December 2018	78th Air Refueling Squadron

- Campaigns. World War II: Rome-Arno; Normandy; Northern France; Southern France; Rhineland; Ardennes-Alsace; Central Europe.

== Lineage ==
- Constituted as the 78th Troop Carrier Squadron on 30 January 1943

Activated on 25 February 1943
Inactivated on 15 November 1945

- Activated in the reserve on 17 July 1947

Redesignated 78th Troop Carrier Squadron, Medium on 26 June 1949
Ordered to active service on 1 March 1951
Inactivated on 1 December 1952

- Activated in the reserve on 1 December 1952

Inactivated on 24 March 1954

- Activated in the Reserve on 1 April 1955

Inactivated on 16 November 1957

- Activated in the Reserve on 8 May 1959

Redesignated 78th Troop Carrier Squadron, Heavy on 8 May 1961
Ordered to active service on 1 October 1961
Relieved from active duty on 27 August 1962
Redesignated 78th Air Transport Squadron, Heavy on 1 December 1965
Redesignated 78th Military Airlift Squadron on 1 January 1966
Redesignated 78th Special Operations Squadron on 1 April 1972
Inactivated on 1 October 1973

- Redesignated 78th Air Refueling Squadron, Heavy (Associate) on 25 March 1981

Activated in the Reserve on 1 November 1981
Redesignated 78th Air Refueling Squadron (Associate) on 1 February 1992
Redesignated 78th Air Refueling Squadron on 1 October 1994

=== Assignments ===
- 435th Troop Carrier Group, 25 February 1943 – 15 November 1945
- 435th Troop Carrier Group, 17 July 1947 – 1 December 1952
- 435th Troop Carrier Group, 1 December 1952 – 24 March 1954
- 435th Troop Carrier Group, 1 April 1955 – 16 November 1957
- 435th Troop Carrier Wing, 8 May 1959
- 917th Troop Carrier Group (later 917th Air Transport Group, 917th Military Airlift Group, 917th Special Operations Group), 17 January 1963 – 1 October 1973
- 452d Air Refueling Wing, 1 November 1981
- 98th Air Refueling Group, 1 October 1987
- 98th Operations Group, 1 August 1992
- 514th Operations Group, 1 October 1994 – 7 September 2024

=== Stations ===
- Bowman Field, Kentucky, 25 February 1943
- Sedalia Army Air Field, Missouri, 4 May 1943
- Pope Field, North Carolina, 2 July 1943
- Baer Field, Indiana, 9–13 October 1943
- RAF Langar (AAF-490), England, 4 November 1943
- RAF Welford (AAF-474), England, January 1944

Detachment operated from Tarquinia Airfield, Italy, 20 July – 23 August 1944

- Bretigny Airfield (A-48), France, 19 February – June 1945
- Baer Field, Indiana, 5 August 1945
- Kellogg Field, Michigan, 23 August – 15 November 1945
- Imeson Field, Jacksonville, Florida, 17 July 1947
- Miami International Airport, Florida, 26 June 1949 – 1 December 1952
- Miami International Airport, Florida, 1 December 1952 – 24 March 1954
- Orlando Air Force Base, Florida, 1 April 1955 – 16 November 1957
- Bates Field, Alabama, 8 May 1959

Deployed at Donaldson Air Force Base, South Carolina, 14–28 August 1960

- Barksdale Air Force Base, Louisiana, 8 May 1961 – 1 October 1973
- Barksdale Air Force Base, Louisiana, 1 November 1981
- McGuire Air Force Base, New Jersey, 1 October 1994 – 7 September 2024

=== Aircraft ===
- Douglas C-53 Skytrooper (1943–1945)
- Douglas C-47 Skytrain (1943–1945)
- Waco CG-4 (1943–1945)
- Airspeed Horsa (1943–1945)
- Curtiss C-46 Commando (1944–1945, 1947–1951, 1952–1954, 1955–1957)
- Fairchild C-119 Flying Boxcar (1951–1952, 1959–1961)
- Douglas C-124 Globemaster II (1961–1972)
- Cessna A-37 Dragonfly (1972–1973)
- McDonnell Douglas KC-10 Extender (1981–2021)
- Boeing KC-46A Pegasus (2021-2024)
