= 435th Operations Group =

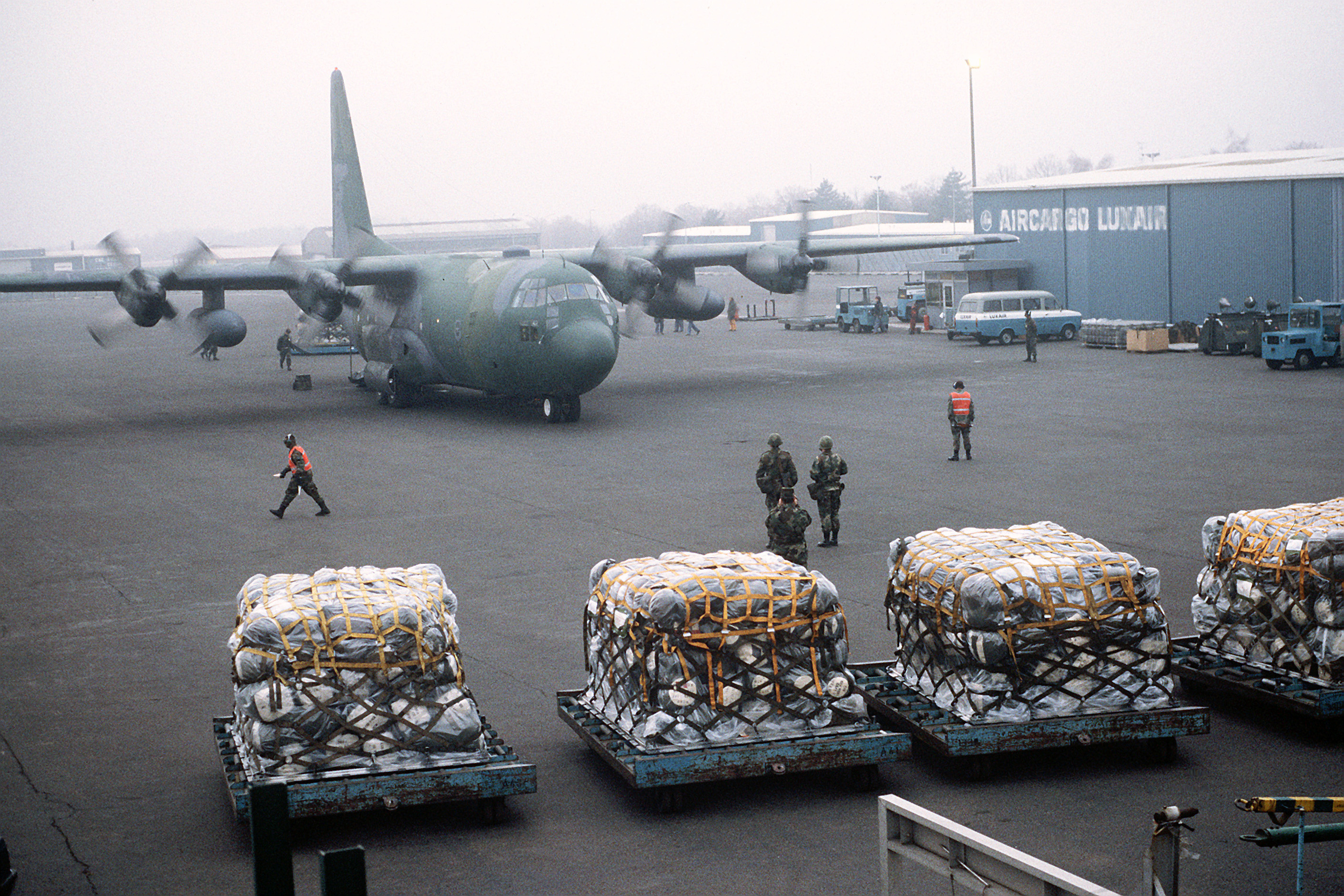
- 435th Wing C-130E Hercules at Luxembourg International Airport
- Active: 1943–1945; 1947–1952; 1952–1959; 1975–1980; 1992–1995
- Country: United States
- Branch: United States Air Force
- Role: Airlift
- Part of: United States Air Forces Europe
- Mottos: Citus et Certus Latin Swift and Sure (after 1952); Saltat Sine Armis Vincere (Latin) He Jumps Without Arms to Conquer (World War II)
- Engagements: European Theater of Operations
- Decorations: Presidential Unit Citation; Air Force Outstanding Unit Award

Insignia
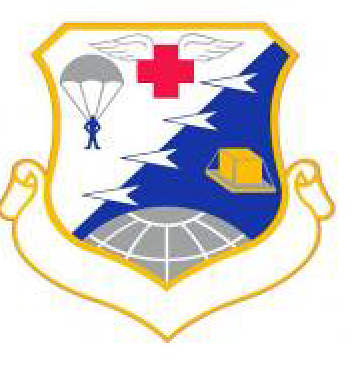
- 435th Operations Group emblem (approved 4 October 1976). (Note: The 435th Group uses the 435th Wing emblem with the group designation on the scroll. Air Force Instruction 84-105, Organizational Lineage, Honors and Heraldry, 19 March 2013, para 3.3.3)

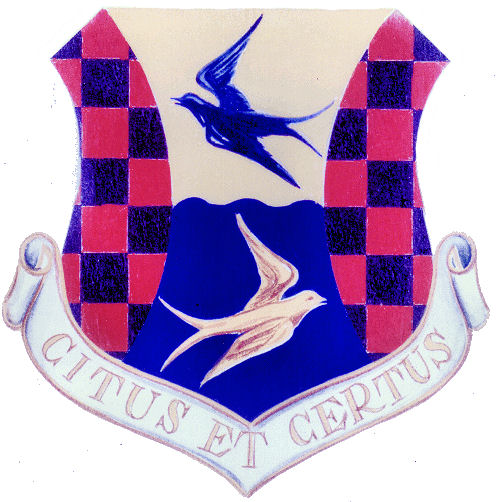
- 435th Troop Carrier Group emblem (approved 22 May 1952)

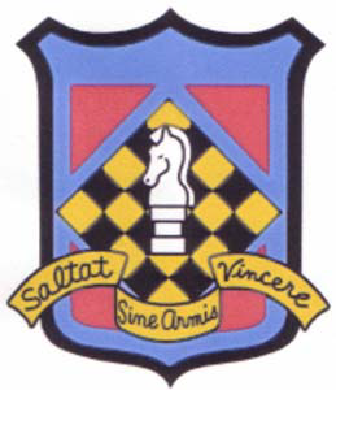
- Unofficial 435th Troop Carrier Group emblem (World War II)

The 435th Operations Group is an inactive United States Air Force unit. Its last assignment was with the 435th Airlift Wing at Rhein-Main Air Base, Germany, where it was inactivated on 1 April 1995.

The unit was first activated during World War II as the 435th Troop Carrier Group, a Douglas C-47 Skytrain transport unit that saw combat with IX Troop Carrier Command in Western Europe. The group flew paratroopers on airborne assaults on Normandy (Operation Overlord); Southern France (Operation Dragoon); the Netherlands (Operation Market Garden), and Germany (Operation Varsity). It also flew combat resupply missions in the relief of Bastogne in 1945. The 435th was awarded a Distinguished Unit Citation for its actions during the Normandy invasion.

The group was activated in the reserve in 1947. It was called to active duty in March 1951 for the Korean War, serving at its home station, Miami International Airport. It returned to reserve duty in December 1952 and continued to serve in the reserves until November 1959, when it was inactivated and its squadrons assigned directly to the 435th Troop Carrier Wing in a reorganization of Continental Air Command reserve units.

The group was reactivated in England in July 1975 as the 435th Tactical Airlift Group, a headquarters for airlift units deployed there. It moved to Rhein-Main Air Base, Germany in October 1978 and was inactivated there in July 1980. When the 435th Wing reorganized under the Objective Wing organization, the group reactivated as the 435th Operations Group. It was inactivated when United States Air Forces Europe reduced its presence at Rhein-Main as it transferred its European airlift operations to Ramstein Air Base, Germany.

== History ==
=== World War II ===
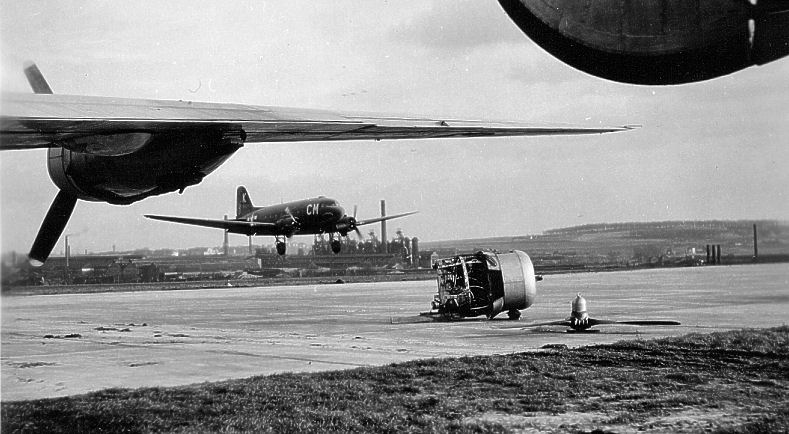
76th Troop Carrier Squadron C-47 landing

Media related to 435th Troop Carrier Group (United States Army Air Forces) at Wikimedia Commons

The group was first activated at Bowman Field, Kentucky in February 1943, with the 75th, 76th, 77th and 78th Troop Carrier Squadrons assigned as its original components. The group used Douglas C-47 Skytrains and Douglas C-53 Skytrooopers in preparing for duty overseas with Ninth Air Force.

The 435th left the United States in October 1943, arriving at RAF Langar, England, in early November. On arrival, it began training for participation in the airborne operation over Normandy. The group flew its first combat missions on D-Day by dropping paratroopers of 101st Airborne Division near Cherbourg Naval Base. The unit towed Waco CG-4A and Airspeed Horsa gliders carrying reinforcements to the same location that afternoon and on the following morning. The group received a Distinguished Unit Citation for its part in Operation Overlord, the Normandy invasion.

The group began transport services following the landings in France and intermittently engaged in missions of this type until V-E Day In these operations the 435th hauled supplies such as serum, blood plasma, radar sets, clothing, rations, and ammunition. It also evacuated wounded personnel to Allied hospitals.

The group interrupted these supply and evacuation missions to train for and participate in three major airborne assaults. It sent a detachment of three squadrons to Tarquinia Airfield, Italy in July 1944 for Operation Dragoon, the invasion of Southern France. The detachment dropped paratroopers over the assault area on 15 August and also released gliders carrying troops and equipment such as jeeps, guns, and ammunition. The following day it flew a resupply mission over France, then transported supplies to bases in Italy before returning to England at the end of the month.

In September 1944 the group participated in Operation Market Garden the unsuccessful airborne operation intended to seize bridges across the Meuse River in the Netherlands, dropping paratroops of the 82d and 101st Airborne Divisions and releasing gliders carrying reinforcements. During the Battle of the Bulge, the group delivered supplies to isolated combat positions of the 101st Airborne and 7th Armored Divisions in Bastogne and Marcouray, Belgium.

The unit moved to Bretigny Airfield, France in February 1945 to prepare for Operation Varsity, the airborne assault across the Rhine River. Each group aircraft participating in this operation towed two gliders transporting troops and equipment to the east bank of the Rhine near Wesel on 24 March. The group then flew resupply missions to Germany in support of ground forces.

The group transported supplies to occupation forces in Germany and evacuated Allied prisoners of war after V-E Day. The group returned to the United States in August and was inactivated on 15 November 1945.

=== Reserve duty ===
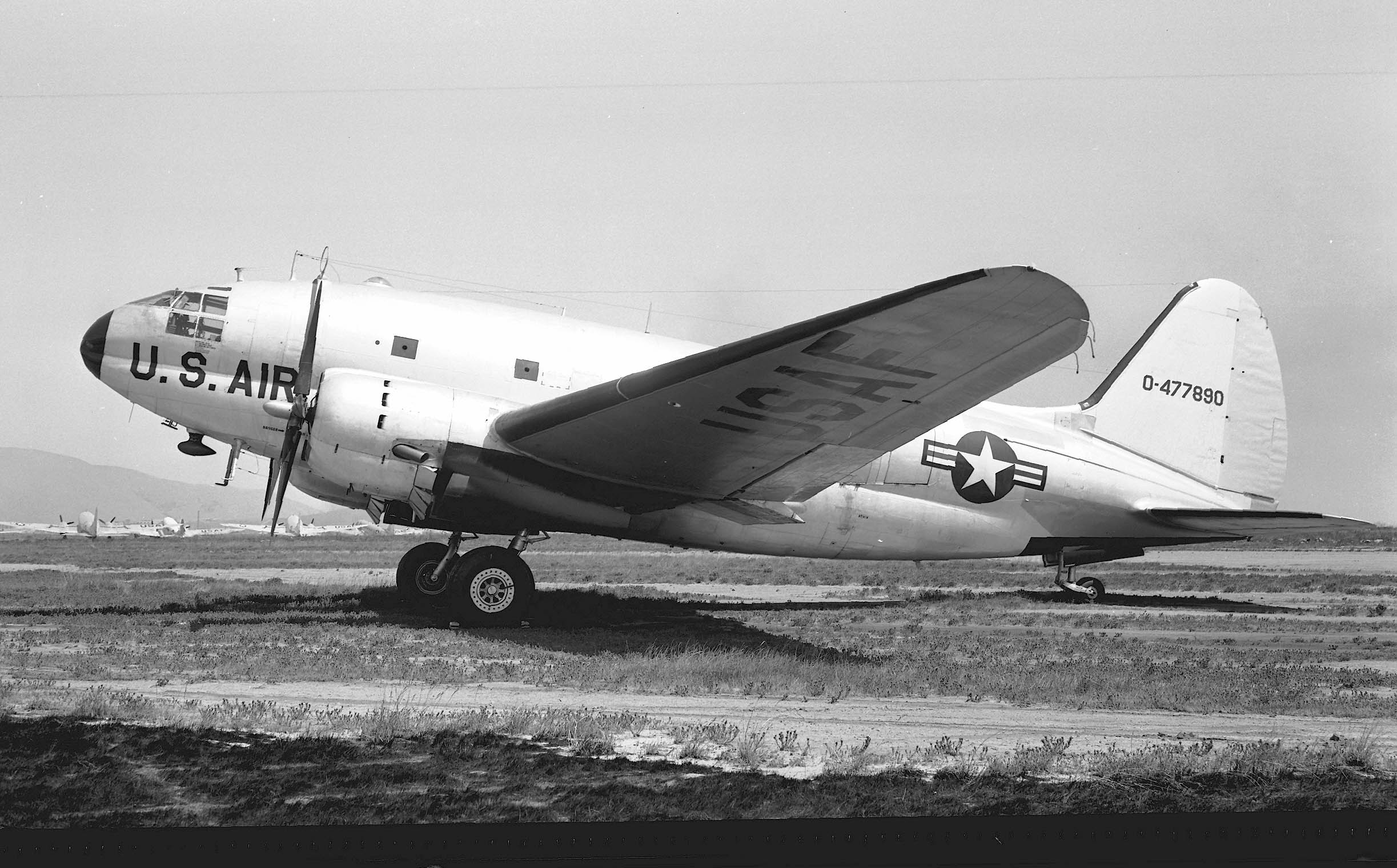
Curtiss C-46D

The group was once again activated as a reserve unit under Air Defense Command at Morrison Field, Florida on 15 July 1947. One of its flying squadrons was located at Orlando Air Force Base and another at Miami International Airport. The group was nominally a Curtiss C-46 Commando unit, but it is not clear to what extent it was equipped with tactical aircraft while at Morrison.

In June 1949, Continental Air Command, which had assumed the responsibility for training reserve units from Air Defense Command in 1948, reorganized its reserve units under the wing base organization system. As part of this reorganization and unit reductions required by President Truman's reduced 1949 defense budget, the 435th Group moved to Miami International Airport, where it was assigned to the newly formed 435th Troop Carrier Wing and formed its cadre from the inactivating 100th Bombardment Group. Reserve flying operations at Morrison came to an end, with the exception of the 326th Troop Carrier Squadron, which remained there until September, when it moved to Pennsylvania and was assigned to another wing. The group was manned at 25% of normal strength but was authorized four squadrons rather than the three of active duty units.

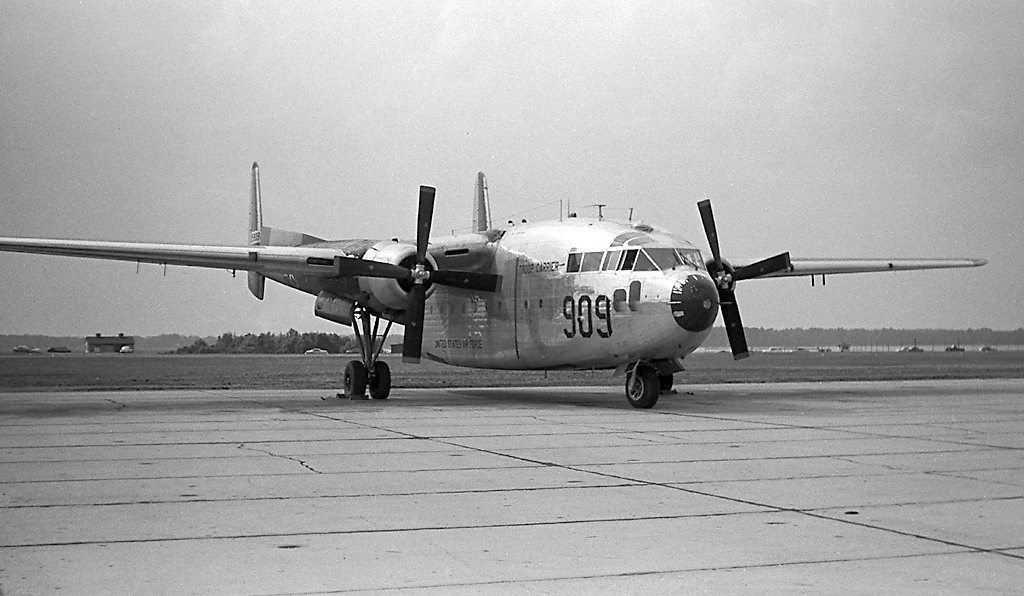
Fairchild C-119G Flying Boxcar

At Miami, the group trained with C-46s under the supervision of the active duty 2585th Air Force Reserve Training Center. The group was ordered into active service in March 1951 as a result of the Korean War. Along with other reserve units called to active duty, it formed Tactical Air Command's Eighteenth Air Force. The group's initial function was to train C-46 aircrews for service in Korea. The group also trained with Fairchild C-119 Flying Boxcars. Although it remained at Miami, the group deployed twice while on active duty: to Laurinburg-Maxton Airport, North Carolina from 21 July until 1 September 1951 and to Grenier Air Force Base, New Hampshire from 2 January to 3 March 1952. It was relieved from active duty and inactivated on 1 December 1952 and its mission, personnel and equipment were transferred to the regular 456th Troop Carrier Wing, which was activated the same day.

The group was activated as a reserve unit the same day at the same station, but with the personnel and equipment of the inactivating 482d Troop Carrier Wing. In the reserve, the group once again flew the Curtiss Commandos. By 1956, the unit was flying overseas missions, particularly in the Caribbean area and in Central America. In addition, for the first time as a reserve unit, its flying was performed in unit tactical aircraft, rather than in trainers.

During the first half of 1955, the Air Force began detaching reserve squadrons to separate locations. The dispersal of separate squadrons to smaller population centers was intended to facilitate recruiting and manning. One of the first three squadrons to move as this policy was implemented was the 78th Troop Carrier Squadron, which was activated at Orlando Air Force Base in April 1955 after having been inactivated at Miami the previous year. In August 1956, the group's 77th Troop Carrier Squadron left Miami for Pinellas County Airport, Florida. The squadron's stay in the Tampa Bay area was brief, however, for in November 1957 it moved again, this time to New Orleans Naval Air Station, Louisiana. Only the 76th Squadron remained with group headquarters in Miami.

In 1957, the group once again received C-119s. The unit was inactivated on 14 April 1959 when the 435th Wing adopted the Dual Deputy organization and the group's squadrons were assigned directly to the wing.

=== European operations ===
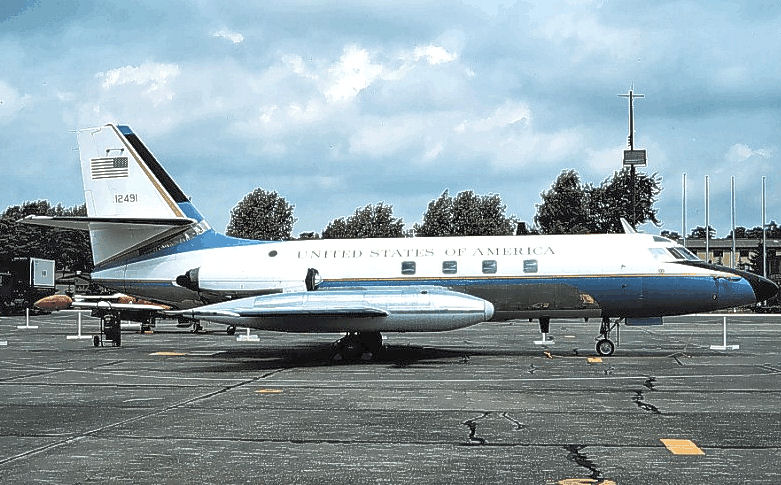
Group C-140 JetStar (Note: Aircraft is Lockheed VC-140B-LM JetStar serial 61-2491. Taken in 1978.)

The group was reactivated in 1975, when Military Airlift Command (MAC) assumed responsibility for theater airlift in Europe. The 435th Military Airlift Support Wing at Rhein-Main Air Base, Germany, which had been responsible for MAC operations in Europe, was redesignated the 435th Tactical Airlift Wing, and the group, redesignated the 435th Tactical Airlift Group, was activated and assigned to it to manage Lockheed C-130 Hercules squadrons deploying from bases in the United States to RAF Mildenhall, England. It assumed this mission from United States Air Forces Europe's 513th Tactical Airlift Wing.

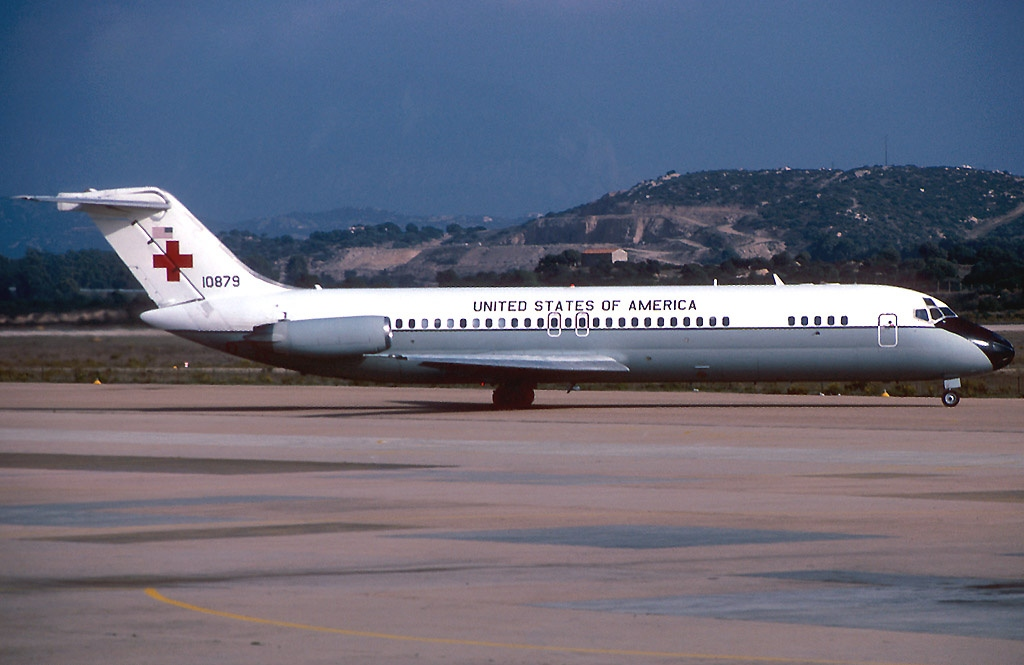
McDonnell Douglas C-9A Nightingale

In June 1978, MAC activated the 322d Airlift Division as its headquarters for European operations, and the group was reassigned directly to the division. This assignment was short-lived, for the reorganization of airlift in Europe included the establishment of a permanent C-130 squadron to replace the rotational units at Mildenhall. In the fall the group moved without personnel and equipment to Rhein-Main and was once again reassigned to the 435th Wing until the group inactivated in June 1980.

The group was activated as 435th Operations Group as part of Objective Wing reorganization of 435th Airlift Wing at Rhein-Main on 1 April 1992.

In January 1994, the 38th Airlift Squadron (Provisional) was organized and attached to the group to integrate Air National Guard and Air Force Reserve Command C-130 and Lockheed C-141 Starlifters deployed from the United States to participate in Operation Provide Promise, the airlift of humanitarian relief to Bosnia and Herzegovina. (Note: The squadron was also known as "Delta Squadron." Citus et Certus, p. 11.) While continuing to support Provide Promise, the group supported Angola's first open elections in 16 years (Operation Provide Transition) and Operation Restore Hope, humanitarian relief to Somalia. This support continued until October 1994, when, in preparation for the reduction of US presence at Rhein-Main, the group's airlift squadron was transferred to the 86th Operations Group at Ramstein Air Base. The group was inactivated along with the 435th Airlift Wing in 1995.

The unit was redesignated as the 435th Expeditionary Operations Group and converted to provisional status on 5 February 2001, however this action was reversed in 2003.

== Lineage ==
- Constituted as the 435th Troop Carrier Group on 30 January 1943

Activated on 25 February 1943
Inactivated on 15 November 1945

- Activated in the reserve on 15 July 1947

Redesignated 435th Troop Carrier Group, Medium on 26 June 1949
Ordered to active duty on 1 March 1951
Relieved from active duty and inactivated on 1 December 1952

- Activated in the reserve on 1 December 1952

Inactivated on 14 April 1959

- Redesignated 435th Tactical Airlift Group and activated on 1 July 1975

Inactivated on 1 June 1980

- Redesignated: 435th Operations Group and activated on 1 April 1992

Inactivated on 1 April 1995

- Redesignated 435th Expeditionary Operations Group and converted to provisional status on 5 February 2001
- Withdrawn from provisional status and redesignated 435th Operations Group on 10 December 2003

=== Assignments ===
- 50th Troop Carrier Wing, 25 February 1943
- 53d Troop Carrier Wing, 15 April 1943
- 50th Troop Carrier Wing, 1 July 1943
- 60 Troop Carrier Wing, 13 August 1943
- I Troop Carrier Command, 4 October 1943
- 50th Troop Carrier Wing, 3 November 1943
- 53d Troop Carrier Wing, 21 February 1944
- United States Strategic Air Forces in Europe 25 June 1945
- I Troop Carrier Command, 2 August 1945
- Third Air Force, 4 – 15 November 1945
- 302d Troop Carrier Wing (later 302d Air Division), 15 July 1947 (Note: Citus et Certus indicates that the group's assignment to I Troop Carrier Command lasted until 15 November 1945. However, I Troop Carrier Command was disbanded on 4 November and replaced as the headquarters for troop carrier units in the United States by IX Troop Carrier Command. Maurer, Combat Units, pp. 438–439, 448–449)
- 435th Troop Carrier Wing, 26 June 1949 – 1 December 1952
- 435th Troop Carrier Wing, 1 December 1952 – 14 April 1959
- 435th Tactical Airlift Wing, 1 July 1975
- 322d Airlift Division, 23 June 1978
- 435th Tactical Airlift Wing, 15 September – 1 June 1980
- 435th Airlift Wing, 1 April 1992 – 1 April 1995
- United States Air Forces Europe to activate or inactivate as needed, 5 February 2001 – 10 December 2003

=== Components ===
Assigned squadrons

- 37th Tactical Airlift Squadron: 15 December 1978 – 1 June 1980, 1 April 1992 – 1 October 1994
- 38th Airlift Squadron (Provisional): Attached 4 January 1994 – 1 October 1994
- 55th Aeromedical Airlift Squadron: 15 September 1978 – 15 December 1978, 1 April 1992 – 1 July 1993
- 58th Military Airlift Squadron: 1 September 1977 – 23 June 1978

Ramstein Air Base, Germany

- 75th Troop Carrier Squadron: 25 February 1943 – 15 November 1945
- 76th Troop Carrier Squadron: 25 February 1943 – 15 November 1945; 15 July 1947 – 1 December 1952; 1 December 1952 – 14 April 1959

Orlando Air Force Base, Florida 1947 – 26 June 1949

- 77th Troop Carrier Squadron: 25 February 1943 – 15 November 1945; 15 July 1947 – 1 December 1952; 1 December 1952 – 14 April 1959

Miami International Airport, Florida 1947-26 June 1949, Pinellas County Airport 18 August 1956 – 16 November 1957, New Orleans Naval Air Station, Louisiana after 16 November 1957

- 78th Troop Carrier Squadron: 25 February 1943 – 15 November 1945; 15 July 1947 – 1 December 1952; 1 December 1952 – 24 March 1954; 1 April 1955 – 15 November 1957

Jacksonville Municipal Airport, Florida, 1947 – 1952, Orlando Air Force Base, Florida, 1955 – 1957

- 326th Troop Carrier Squadron: 15 July 1947 – 2 September 1949 (Note: Remained at Morrison Field in June 1949.)
- 349th Troop Carrier Squadron: 26 June 1949 – 23 March 1951
- 435th Operations Support Squadron: 1 April 1992 – 1 October 1994

Attached rotation squadrons

- 32d Tactical Airlift Squadron: Attached 9 September 1977 – 14 November 1977
- 39th Tactical Airlift Squadron: Attached 4 January 1977 – 4 March 1977
- 40th Tactical Airlift Squadron: Attached 12 January 1976 – 15 March 1976, 16 April 1977 – 15 July 1977
- 41st Tactical Airlift Squadron: Attached 13 July 1976 – 10 September 1976, 5 March 1977 – 25 April 1977, 2 May 1978 – 22 July 1978

=== Stations ===
- Bowman Field, Kentucky, 25 February 1943
- Sedalia Army Air Field, Missouri, 4 May 1943
- Pope Field, North Carolina, 2 July 1943
- Baer Field, Indiana, 6 – 13 October 1943
- RAF Langar (AAF-490), England, 3 November 1943
- RAF Welford (AAF-474), England, 25 January 1944
- Bretigny Airfield (A-48), France, c. 13 February – 25 June 1945
- Baer Field, Indiana, 5 August 1945
- Kellogg Field, Michigan, 13 September – 15 November 1945
- Morrison Field, Florida, 15 July 1947
- Miami International Airport, Florida, 26 June 1949 – 1 December 1952
- Miami International Airport, Florida, 1 December 1952 – 14 April 1959
- RAF Mildenhall, England, 1 July 1975
- Rhein-Main Air Base, Germany, 1 October 1978 – 1 June 1980
- Rhein-Main Air Base, Germany, 1 April 1992 – 1 April 1995

=== Aircraft ===
- Douglas C-47 Skytrain, 1943–1945
- Douglas C-53 Skytrooper, 1943
- Waco CG-4A glider, 1943–1945
- North American T-6 Texan, 1949–1951
- Beechcraft T-7 Navigator, 1949–1951
- Beechcraft T-11 Kansan, 1949–1951
- Curtiss C-46 Commando, 1949–1951; 1952–1957
- Fairchild C-119 Flying Boxcar, 1951–1952, 1957–1959
- Lockheed C-130 Hercules, 1975–1980
- Douglas C-9A Nightingale, 1992–1993
- Boeing VC-135 Stratolifter, 1977–1978
- Lockheed VC-140 JetStar, 1977–1978
- Beechcraft C-12 Huron, 1978
- North American CT-39 Sabreliner, 1978
- Lockheed C-141 Starlifter, 1994

=== Awards and campaigns ===
Award streamer	Award	Dates	Notes
	Distinguished Unit Citation	6 June 1944–7 June 1944	Normandy, 435th Troop Carrier Group
	Air Force Outstanding Unit Award	15 December 1978–31 May 1980	435th Tactical Airlift Group
	Air Force Outstanding Unit Award	1 April 1992–30 June 1993	435th Operations Group

Campaign Streamer	Campaign	Dates	Notes
	Normandy	6 June 1944 – 24 July 1944	435th Troop Carrier Group
	Northern France	25 July 1944 – 14 September 1944	435th Troop Carrier Group
	Rhineland	15 September 1944 – 21 March 1945	435th Troop Carrier Group
	Ardennes-Alsace	16 December 1944 – 25 January 1945	435th Troop Carrier Group
	Central Europe	22 March 1944 – 21 May 1945	435th Troop Carrier Group
	Rome-Arno	22 January 1944 – 9 September 1944	435th Troop Carrier Group
	Southern France	15 August 1944 – 14 September 1944	435th Troop Carrier Group
