= 482nd Fighter Wing =

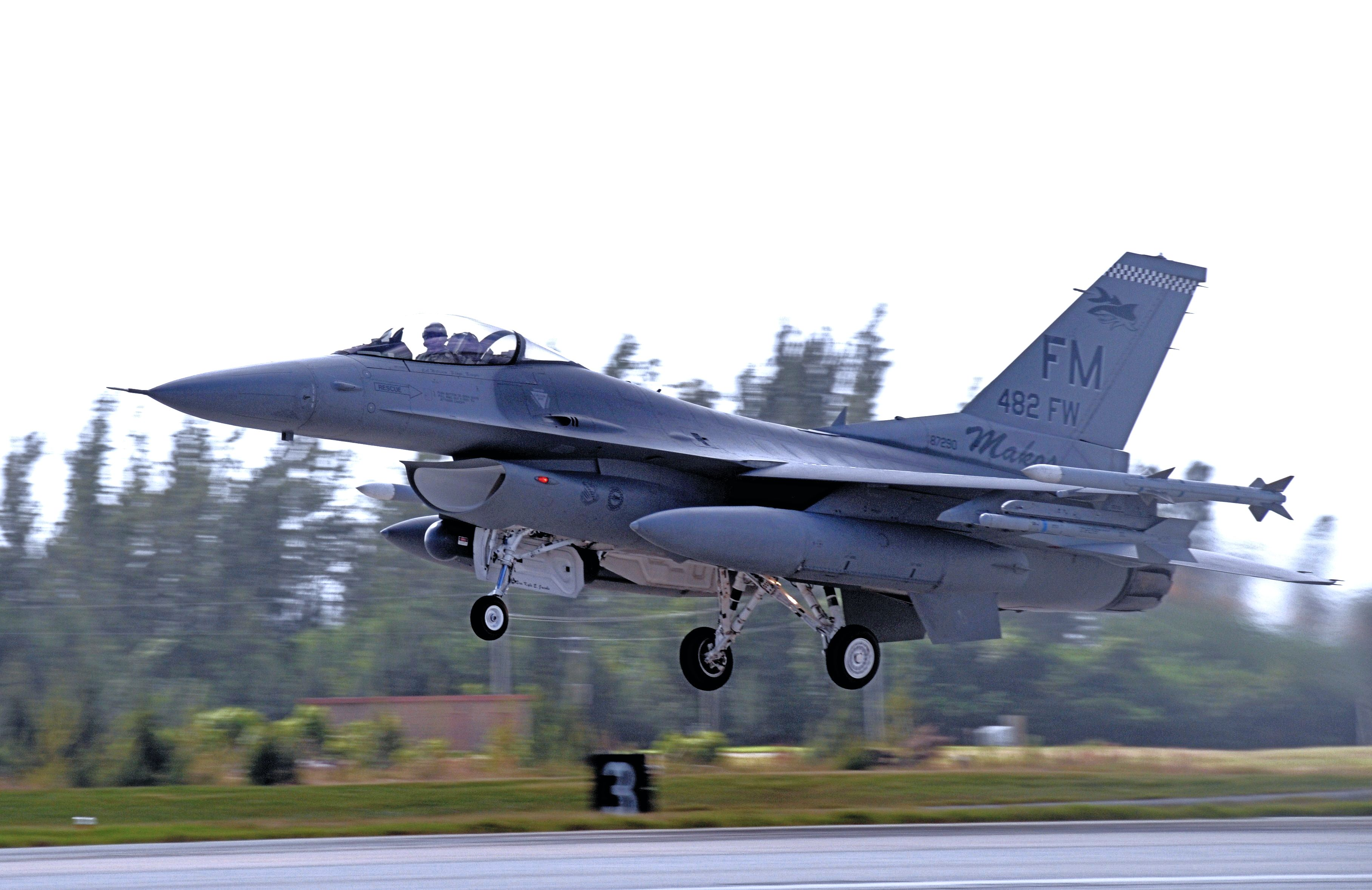
- F-16C Fighting Falcon of the 482nd Fighter Wing (Note: Aircraft is General Dynamics F-16C Block 30H Fighting Falcon serial 87–290.)
- Active: 1952; 1952–1957; 1981–present
- Country: United States
- Branch: United States Air Force
- Type: Wing
- Role: Fighter
- Size: 2,500 personnel
- Part of: Air Force Reserve Command
- Garrison/HQ: Homestead Air Reserve Base, Florida
- Decorations: Air Force Outstanding Unit Award

Commanders
- Commander: Col Brandon M. Kelly
- Vice Commander: Col Adam Meyers
- Command Chief: CCM Adelaide Schrowang

Insignia
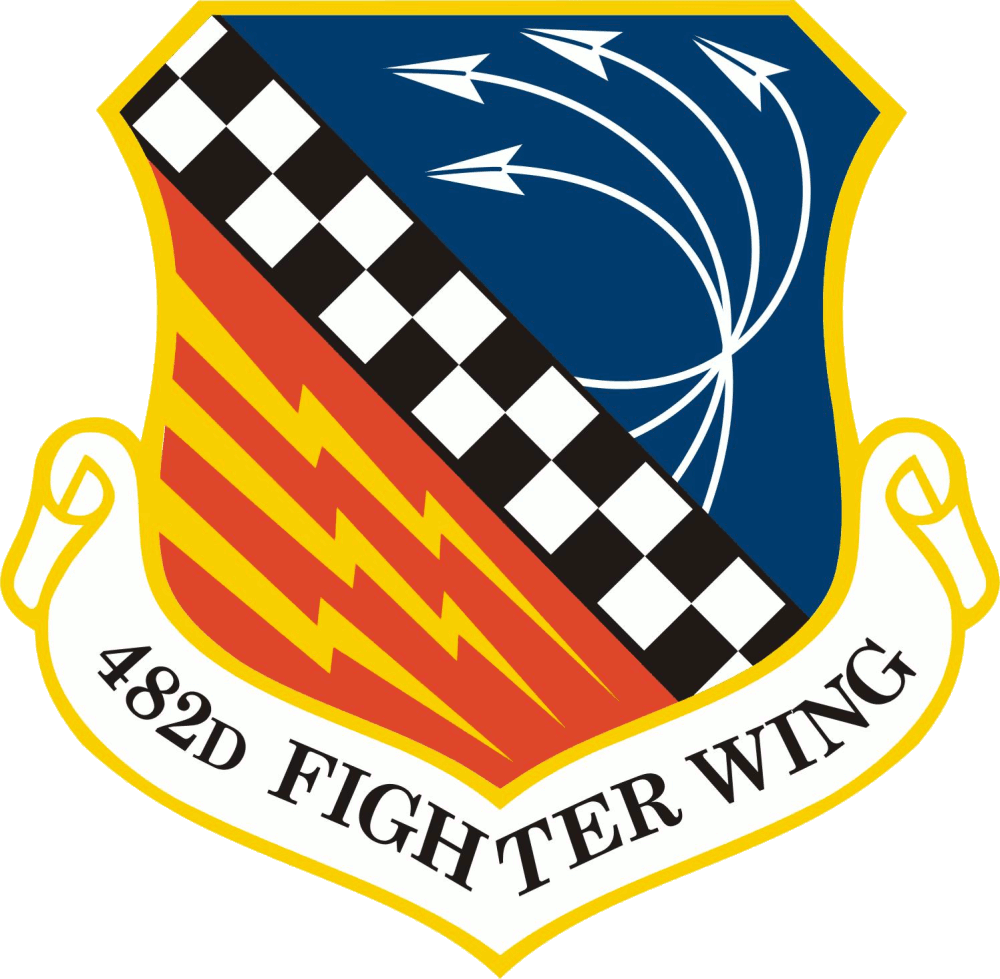
- 482nd Fighter52 Wing emblem (approved 1989)
- Tail code: FM

Aircraft flown
- Fighter: F-16C and F-16D Fighting Falcon

The 482nd Fighter Wing (482 FW) is an Air Reserve Component (ARC) unit of the United States Air Force. It is assigned to the Tenth Air Force, Air Force Reserve Command (AFRC), stationed at Homestead Air Reserve Base, Florida. If mobilized to active duty, the 482 FW is operationally gained by the Air Combat Command (ACC).

The 482 FW is the "host wing" for Homestead Air Reserve Base, maintaining and operating the installation located near the southern end of the Florida peninsula, about 25 miles south of Miami. It is a combat coded unit which provides F-16C and F-16D (Block 30) Fighting Falcon multirole fighter aircraft, along with mission ready pilots and support personnel, for short-notice worldwide deployment. The 482 FW has more than 2,500 personnel, including more than 1,700 Traditional Reservists (TR). There are also more than 240 officers and airmen who are full-time reservists as Air Reserve Technicians (ART), further augmented by more than 250 full-time civilians.

The 482 FW is also home to the 367th Fighter Squadron (367 FS), an active duty Regular Air Force F-16 unit assigned to ACC, but integrating with the 482 FW under the Total Force Integration (TFI) concept. The 367 FS has more than 170 active duty members assigned, to include pilots, operational support personnel, and aircraft maintenance personnel.

In addition to its flying mission, the 482 FW also provides the United States Department of Defense with a fully functional air base with ready access to a strategic staging location on the rim of the Caribbean Basin. Contingency and training operations for both the United States Northern Command (USNORTHCOM) and United States Southern Command (USSOUTHCOM) can be mounted from Homestead ARB.

== Units ==
- 482d Operations Group (F-16 Fighting Falcon)

93rd Fighter Squadron
482d Operations Support Squadron

- 482nd Mission Support Group

482d Civil Engineer Squadron
482d Communications Squadron
70th Aerial Port Squadron
482d Logistics Readiness Squadron
482d Force Support Squadron
482d Security Forces Squadron

- 482d Maintenance Group

482d Aircraft Maintenance Squadron
482d Maintenance Operations Squadron
482d Maintenance Squadron

- 482d Medical Squadron

== History ==
For related history and lineage, see 482nd Operations Group

=== Troop carrier operations ===
During the Korean War, all Air Force Reserve combat organizations had been mobilized, and it was not until the summer of 1952 that these reserve units again began receiving aircraft. The wing was first activated as the 482d Troop Carrier Wing (482 TCW) in the reserve with C-46 Commando aircraft in June 1952, operating from a military cantonment area at Miami International Airport, Florida. The 482 TCW replaced the 906th Reserve Training Wing, which had been activated following the mobilization of the 435th Troop Carrier Wing (435 TCW) for the Korean War, as Air Force Reserve flying operations resumed under the supervision of the 2585th Air Force Reserve Training Center. In December, the 435 TCW was released from active duty and assumed the mission, personnel and equipment of the 482 TCW, which was inactivated. (Note: Although it had been mobilized in 1951, the 435 TCW remained in Miami as a training organization for C-46 crews deploying to the Far East. Ravenstein, p. 231. When it was released from active duty on 1 December 1952, its resources were taken over by the newly-activated 456th Troop Carrier Wing (456 TCW), while it took over those of the 482 TCW. Ravenstein, pp. 231, 251, 268.)

=== Fighter operations in the 1950s ===
In the early 1950s, the Air Force determined that all its reserve units should be designed to augment the regular forces in the event of a national emergency. Six Air Force Reserve pilot training wings had no mobilization mission. On 18 May 1955, they were discontinued and replaced by three troop carrier wings and two fighter-bomber wings. In this reorganization, the 94th Tactical Reconnaissance Wing (94 TRW) at Dobbins Air Force Base, Georgia moved on paper to Scott Air Force Base, Illinois to replace the 8711th Pilot Training Wing. The 482d, now designated the 482d Fighter-Bomber Wing (482 FBW) took over the 94th's personnel and equipment at Dobbins AFB as one of the new Air Force Reserve fighter units.

The wing began training for the fighter mission, initially using F-80 Shooting Star fighters, plus T-28 Trojan and T-33A Shooting Star trainers that it inherited from the 94 TRW. Later that year, it began to equip with the F-84 Thunderjet. Despite its fighter bomber designation, the wing was gained by Air Defense Command (ADC) upon mobilization. ADC required the wing's squadrons to be designed to augment active duty squadrons capable of performing air defense missions for an indefinite period after mobilization independently of their parent wing.

In 1957, the wing began to replace its F-84s with F-86 Sabre aircraft. However, the Joint Chiefs of Staff were pressuring the Air Force to provide more wartime airlift. At the same time, about 150 C-119 Flying Boxcar aircraft became available from the active force. Consequently, in November 1956 the Air Force directed Continental Air Command (ConAC) to convert three Air Force reserve fighter bomber wings to troop carrier units during 1957. Sabre training ended and, instead, C-119 aircraft arrived in October 1957. In November the 482 TCW was inactivated and its assets transferred to the 445th Troop Carrier Wing (445 TCW).

=== Fighter operations resume ===
The wing was reactivated as the 482nd Tactical Fighter Wing (482 TFW) in April 1981 and replaced the 915th Tactical Fighter Group (915 TFG) at what was then Homestead Air Force Base, Florida, flying the F-4C Phantom II, later transitioning to the F-4D Phantom II. With its establishment, the new wing also controlled two additional Air Force Reserve F-4D tactical fighter groups as geographically separated units (GSU) at Bergstrom Air Force Base, Texas (1981–1982) and Wright-Patterson Air Force Base, Ohio (1982–1994).

In 1989, the 482 TFW began retiring its F-4D aircraft and commenced conversion to the F-16A and F-16B (Block 15) Fighting Falcon.

Following a USAF reorganization in the summer of 1992 in response to the end of the Cold War, TAC was inactivated and the new operational gaining command for the 482 TFW became the newly established Air Combat Command (ACC). In keeping with similar redesignations across USAF, the 482 TFW was redesignated the 482nd Fighter Wing (482 FW).

==== Hurricane Andrew ====
Prior to the arrival of Hurricane Andrew in August 1992, the 482 FW, like all other Regular Air Force, Air Force Reserve, and Florida Air National Guard units at Homestead AFB, evacuated all its flyable aircraft to alternate locations. In the case of the 482 FW, the wing evacuated to Wright-Patterson AFB. Due to the massive damage to Homestead AFB and the surrounding community caused by Hurricane Andrew, the 482 FW remained at and conducted flight operations from Wright-Patterson AFB until December 1992, when it relocated to MacDill Air Force Base, Florida. The 482 FW remained a tenant at MacDill AFB, conducting flight operations from that installation until March 1994, when it finally returned to Homestead AFB.

Due to the catastrophic damage to Homestead AFB, the installation was placed on the 1993 Base Realignment and Closure Commission's initial BRAC base closings list, potentially dooming the base to closure. Such action would have also consigned the 482 FW to either relocation or inactivation. However, the BRAC Commission recommended retaining Homestead AFB, relocating the active duty host wing, the 31st Fighter Wing (31 FW), to Italy and rebuilding and realigning the installation as a smaller AFRES installation controlled by the 482 FW.

==== 482 FW as Host Wing ====
The 482 FW became host wing of the now renamed Homestead Air Reserve Station on 1 April 1994 and provided weapons training support for Air Force units beginning in October 1994. In February 1995, the 1995 Base Realignment and Closure Commission again proposed closure of what was now Homestead ARS and either relocating or inactivating the 482 FW. This BRAC Commission subsequently withdrew Homestead ARS and the 482 FW from further consideration in June 1995.

From 1997, the 482 FW periodically deployed personnel and aircraft to Incirlik Air Base, Turkey to help enforce Operation Northern Watch, the no-fly zone over Northern Iraq established following Operation Desert Storm. That same year, the Air Force Reserve ceased to be a USAF Field Operating Agency and transitioned in status to that of a USAF major command (MAJCOM) designated as the Air Force Reserve Command (AFRC). The 482 FW became an AFRC command by default and the acronym "AFRES" previously painted on the empennage of the wing's aircraft was replaced by the acronym "AFRC" in the same fuselage location.

=== 21st Century operations ===
Following the Al Qaeda attacks on the U.S. homeland on 11 September 2001, the ‘Global War On Terror’ put the 482 FW on the front line of Operation Enduring Freedom and the war in Afghanistan. Along with flying a continuous stateside Combat Air Patrol (CAP) mission from Homestead ARS, elements of the 482nd Fighter Wing deployed in October 2001 to Al Jaber Air Base, Kuwait as part of a regularly scheduled Aerospace Expeditionary Force (AEF) rotation in support of Operation Southern Watch to enforce the no-fly zone over southern Iraq. Once established at Al Jaber, pilots of the 482 FW's 93rd Fighter Squadron (93 FS), the "Makos," began flying additional combat missions as part of Operation Enduring Freedom over Afghanistan. Throughout the 90-day deployment, Mako pilots with 482 FW maintenance personnel in support, flew 9 to 15 hours a day as part of a larger Air Reserve Component "rainbow wing" at Al Jaber.

In early March 2003, as they prepared for yet another rotation to Operation Southern Watch at Al Jaber AB, members of the wing's 93 FS advance party found themselves on the front lines for the launch of Operation Iraqi Freedom (OIF). Two pilots and two F-16C aircraft from the unit contributed to the "shock and awe" campaign over Baghdad, as well as other Iraqi targets, during the first and continued waves of the coalition forces campaign. Back at home, the resumption of the Operation Noble Eagle Air Defense alert mission over the United States, augmenting Air National Guard F-15 and F-16 units, added to the high operations tempo the wing faced that year. In total, the 482 FW contributed more than 200 personnel mobilized to active duty in support of Operations Noble Eagle, Enduring Freedom and Iraqi Freedom, predominately from security forces, services, and civil engineering squadron.

In December 2003, Homestead ARS was renamed Homestead Air Reserve Base. However, for a third time, Homestead ARB again faced potential closure and, despite its recent combat experience in Afghanistan and Iraq, the 482 FW also faced potential inactivation, this time from the 2005 Base Realignment and Closure Commission. The wing received numerous visits throughout the year from government decision makers and the BRAC Commission eventually decided to keep Homestead ARB open, to include redistributing nine additional F-16 aircraft from other Air Reserve Component F-16 bases that were changing to aircraft other than the F-16 or losing flying missions outright.

From 15 July 2010 to 1 October 2012, the 482 FW also functioned as the parent wing for a new geographically separated unit (GSU), the 414th Fighter Group (414 FG), an AFRC unit flying the F-15E Strike Eagle as an Associate unit to ACC's 4th Fighter Wing (4 FW) at Seymour Johnson Air Force Base, North Carolina. In October 2012, parent wing responsibility for the 414 FG and its associated fighter squadron and maintenance squadron shifted from the 482 FW to the 944th Fighter Wing (944 FW) at Luke Air Force Base, Arizona.

In 2015, ACC activated an Active Associate unit at Homestead ARB, the 367th Fighter Squadron (367 FS), under the Total Force Integration (TFI) initiative, embedding the squadron in the 482 FW. The establishment of the 367 FS, with over 170 active duty F-16 pilots, operational support personnel, and aircraft maintenance personnel, marked the return of a permanently based Regular Air Force flying unit to Homestead ARB for the first time since the 1994 departure of the 31 FW.

In addition to its past deployments in support of the since concluded Operations Northern Watch, Southern Watch, Enduring Freedom, and Iraqi Freedom, the 482 FW has also participated in Operation New Horizons, Operation Unified Response, and Operation New Dawn, and it continues to provide support for Operation Noble Eagle.

As host wing for Homestead ARB, the 482 FW also provides base support for several tenant commands and units, to include:

- Detachment 1, 125th Fighter Wing (Det 1, 125 FW), Florida Air National Guard from that unit's home station at Jacksonville Air National Guard Base. Det 1, 125 FW operates a North American Aerospace Defense Command (NORAD) alert facility at Homestead ARB, providing no less than two armed F-15C Eagle fighter aircraft on 24/7/365 alert in support of NORAD's Continental NORAD Region (CONR) air defense mission for the southeastern United States under Operation Noble Eagle.
- United States Special Operations Command South (SOCSOUTH), an active duty tenant command of approximately 300 personnel commanded by either a major general or a rear admiral. SOCSOUTH is a subordinate component command of United States Southern Command (USSOUTHCOM) and a theater special operations command (TSOC) of United States Special Operations Command (USSOCOM).
- U.S. Coast Guard Maritime Safety and Security Team Miami
- 50th Regional Support Group (50th RSG), Florida Army National Guard
- U.S. Customs and Border Protection Air and Maritime Branch air interdiction mission
- Several other U.S. government satellite offices located on Homestead ARB

== Lineage ==
- Established as 482nd Troop Carrier Wing, Medium on 26 May 1952

Activated in the reserve on 14 June 1952
Inactivated on 1 December 1952

- Redesignated 482nd Fighter-Bomber Wing on 12 April 1955

Activated in the reserve on 18 May 1955
Inactivated on 16 November 1957

- Redesignated 482nd Tactical Fighter Wing on 25 February 1981

Activated in the reserve on 1 April 1981
Redesignated 482nd Fighter Wing on 1 February 1992

=== Assignments ===
- Fourteenth Air Force, 14 June – 1 December 1952
- Fourteenth Air Force, 18 May 1955 – 16 November 1957
- Tenth Air Force, 1 April 1981 – present

=== Components ===
Groups

- 414th Fighter Group: 15 July 2010 – 1 October 2012
- 482d Troop Carrier Group (later 482d Fighter-Bomber Group, 482d Operations Group): 14 June – 1 December 1952; 18 May 1955 – 16 November 1957; 1 August 1992 – present
- 906th Tactical Fighter Group: 1 July 1982 – 30 September 1994

Wright-Patterson Air Force Base, Ohio

- 924th Tactical Fighter Group: 1 July 1981 – 1 October 1982

Bergstrom Air Force Base, Texas

- 482nd Maintenance Group
- 482nd Mission Support Group

Squadrons

- 93rd Fighter Squadron: 1 April 1981 – 1 August 1992
  - Shifted as subordinate to 482nd Operations Group, 1 August 1992
- 482nd Medical Squadron

=== Stations ===
- Miami International Airport, Florida, 14 June – 1 December 1952
- Dobbins Air Force Base, Georgia, 18 May 1955 – November 1957
- Homestead Air Force Base (later Homestead Air Reserve Base), Florida, 1 April 1981 – present

=== Aircraft ===
- Curtiss C-46 Commando, 1952
- Lockheed F-80 Shooting Star, 1955
- Republic F-84 Thunderjet, 1955–1957
- North American T-28 Trojan 1955–1957
- Lockheed T-33 Shooting Star, 1955–1957
- North American F-86 Sabre, 1957
- Fairchild C-119 Flying Boxcar, 1957
- McDonnell Douglas F-4 Phantom II, 1981–1989
- General Dynamics (now Lockheed Martin) F-16 Fighting Falcon, 1989–present

== See also ==
- List of F-86 Sabre units
- McDonnell Douglas F-4 Phantom II non-U.S. operators
- General Dynamics F-16 Fighting Falcon operators
