= Ramstein Air Base =

US Air Force base in Rhineland-Palatinate, Germany

- Part of Kaiserslautern Military Community (KMC)
- Near Kaiserslautern, Rheinland-Pfalz in Germany
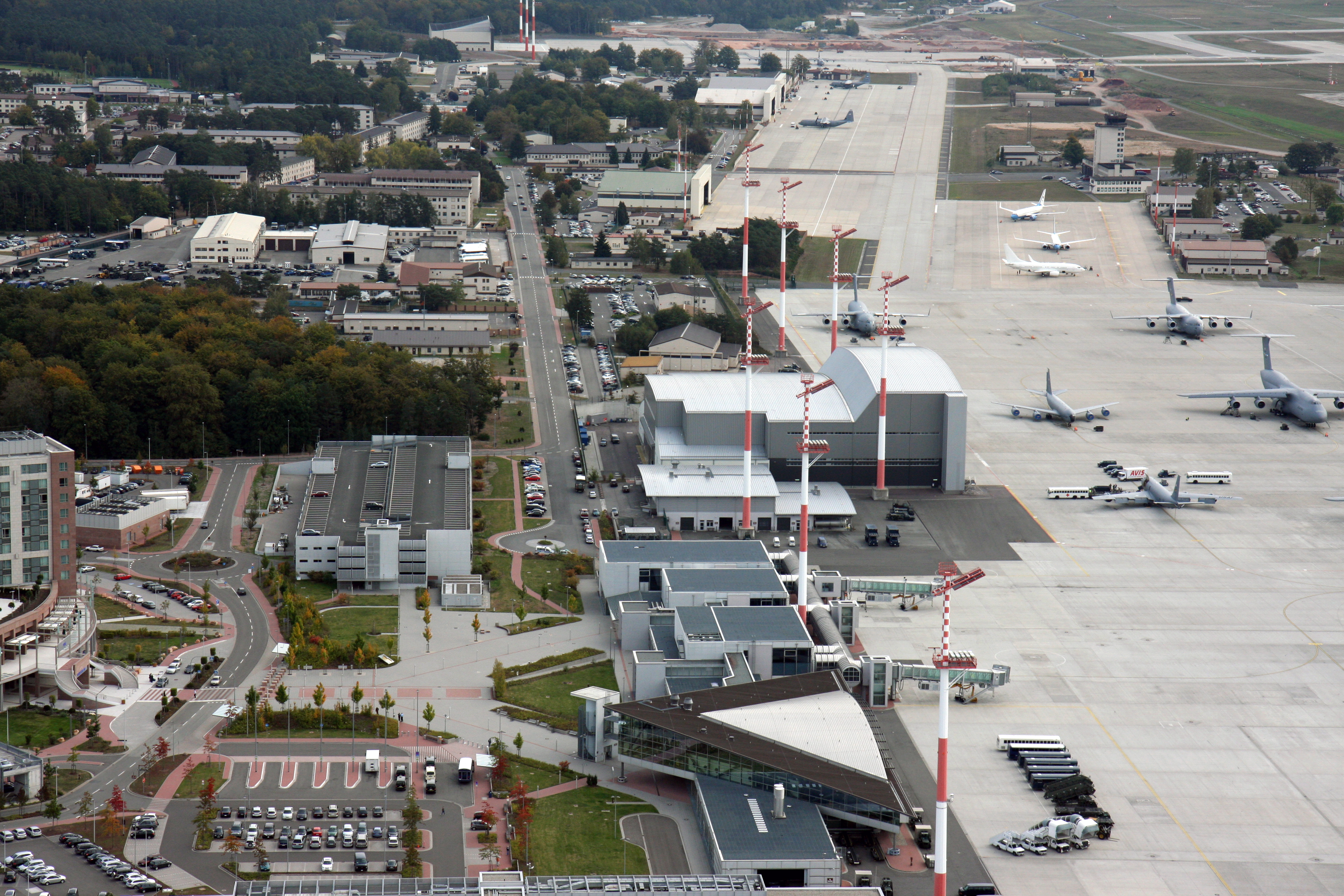
- Aerial view of Ramstein AB, 2009

Site information
- Type: US Air Force base
- Owner: German Federal Government
- Operator: US Air Force
- Controlled by: US Air Forces in Europe – Air Forces Africa
- Condition: Operational
- Website: Official website

Location
- Location within Rhineland-Palatinate Location within Germany Location within Europe
- Coordinates: 49°26′13″N 7°36′0″E
- Area: 1,400 ha (3,500 acres)

Site history
- Built: 1949–1953
- In use: 1953–present

Garrison information
- Current commander: Brigadier General Adrienne L. Williams
- Garrison: 86th Airlift Wing
- Occupants: 37th Airlift Squadron; 76th Airlift Squadron; See Based units section for full list.

Airfield information
- Identifiers: IATA: RMS, ICAO: ETAR
- Elevation: 238 m (781 ft) AMSL
Runways
Direction	Length and surface
08/26	3,199 m (10,497 ft) Asphalt
09/27	3,000 m (9,841 ft) Asphalt
- Sources: DoD FLIP

Ramstein Air Base (IATA: RMS, ICAO: ETAR) (before 1958 Ramstein–Landstuhl) is a United States Air Force installation located in Rhineland-Palatinate, southwestern Germany. It serves as the headquarters for the United States Air Forces in Europe – Air Forces Africa (USAFE-AFAFRICA) and NATO Allied Air Command (AIRCOM). The base plays a key role in supporting forward military operations, particularly those deploying to Eastern Europe and Africa.

Designed in 1949 by the French Army and built by German contractors between 1951 and 1953, the Ramstein Air Base hosts over 16,200 military personnel, U.S. civilians, and contractors. The base is located near the town of Ramstein-Miesenbach, with the east gate about 16 km (10 mi; 9 nmi) from Kaiserslautern, commonly known as "K-Town" among Americans. (Note: "Ramstein AB | Base Overview & Info". Military OneSource. "'K-Town', as some call it, Kaiserslautern is known for being the largest American community in Europe.") Other nearby towns include Landstuhl, located 5 km (3 mi; 3 nmi) from the base's west gate.

Ramstein AB is part of the larger Kaiserslautern Military Community (KMC), which houses around 54,000 American service members and over 5,400 U.S. civilian employees. Additionally, more than 6,200 German workers are employed within the KMC. Air Force units in the KMC employ nearly 9,800 military personnel, supported by approximately 11,100 family members.

== History ==
=== Development and establishment ===
In 1940, construction of today's Bundesautobahn 6 was stopped when a bridge that was being built across the Rhine River near Mannheim collapsed, leaving a section of autobahn that could not be used. A part of the unused autobahn to the west of Mannheim, near Kaiserslautern, was used as an airstrip by the Luftwaffe. The airstrip was also used by the advancing U.S. Army Air Forces during the final months of World War II. The old autobahn section is still used as the access road to the east and west gates of the base and the A6 was rebuilt south of the air base after the war.

During the initial postwar era, the USAAF repaired several former Luftwaffe airfields in Bavaria, part of the American occupation zone of Germany.

The area was a swamp that had to be built up by two metres (six feet). A train line was laid out from Einsiedlerhof-Kaiserslautern in a yoke shape around to the current base and back down to the Landstuhl spur in 1948, by agreement of the U.S. and French Occupational Forces. Trainloads of earth were moved over the line and spread over the base's current area to raise it to its current level. Once the ground was level, construction work began. Two bases were laid out. Landstuhl Air Base on the south side and Ramstein Air Station (station, no airstrip) on the north. From 1948 to the opening of the bases in 1953, it was the largest one spot construction site in Europe employing over 270,000 workers at one time.

Enough construction was completed in mid-1952 that Landstuhl AB was opened on 5 August. Its facilities included a runway, dispersal hardstands, a control tower, ramps, and other flight-related facilities and the associated flying and support units. On 1 February 1952, Det 1, 86th Fighter-Bomber Wing arrived at Landstuhl AB from Neubiberg Air Base near Munich.

On 1 June 1953, Ramstein Air Station was opened. Ramstein was the location of headquarters, Twelfth Air Force, and supported family housing, base exchange, commissary, dependents' schools and other administrative offices for the WAFs (Women's Air Force). The barracks that were built at Ramstein AS were used to house WAFs and single women that worked as U.S. Government employees at both Ramstein AS and Landstuhl AB. On 27 April 1953, Headquarters, Twelfth Air Force was activated on Ramstein Air Base, having moved from its joint facilities with HQ USAFE at Wiesbaden AB. What was not generally known at the time and not made public until after the end of the Cold War in 1993, was the desire to have HQ Twelfth Air Force in close proximity to the Air Defense Operations Center (ADOC) — Kindsbach, a.k.a. 'Kindsbach Cave' — the site of NATO's underground combat operations center.

=== Operational history ===
The 86th Air Base Group was activated as the main base support unit for Landstuhl, while the 7030th HQ Support Group was the main base support unit for Ramstein. On 1 December 1957, the two bases were consolidated into the largest NATO-controlled air base in service on the continent. It was called "Ramstein–Landstuhl Air Base", but later, after the West German government continued construction of the A6 autobahn from Kaiserslautern to Saarbrücken, the autobahn cut off access at the south of the base, which is where the main gate was within the city limits of Landstuhl. The main gate was moved to the west side of the base which was located in the town of Ramstein. The two bases were joined and the current Kisling Memorial Drive cut off to the public which unified the bases. In 1961, the base was officially named "Ramstein Air Base."

One legacy of the two separate air bases is that the north side of Ramstein retained a separate APO from the south side. The north side (Ramstein AB) is APO AE 09012, while the south side (Landstuhl AB) is APO AE 09009. There existed separate Combat Support Groups, the 7030th for the north side, and the 86th for the south side until their consolidation in the 1980s, when both were merged into the 377th Combat Support Wing. There is still a north and south side Fitness Center. The current northside Community Center previously housed the WAF NCO Club. As well, there were two Movie Theaters on the North side and two on the South side. Currently, only two still stand on the north side: a remodeled Nightingale Theater (known before as the Four Corners Theater) on the corner across from the Base gas Station, and the north side AAFES dry cleaners that was known as the Ramstein Rocket Theater.

Near the Ramstein Air Base is the Landstuhl Regional Medical Center (LRMC), operated by the United States Army. Although part of the Kaiserslautern Military Community, LRMC has a separate history and was never a part of Ramstein or Landstuhl Air Bases, although both facilities have utilized the medical facilities at LRMC, since they were established in 1953. The U.S. Department of Defense built a new Medical Center on the current U.S. Army Weilerbach Storage Installation just to the east of Ramstein AB. Construction was completed around 2024. It is a twelve-story facility to house all departments of LRMC and the current Ramstein AB Clinic along with Dental Clinic facilities for the whole KMC. In turn, the East Gate to Ramstein AB was extended from its current location to just off the Autobahn 6 Einsiedlerhof exit to the base at what is known as the LVIS Gate.

From 2004 to 2006, Ramstein Air Base underwent an extensive expansion with a major construction project – including an all-new airport terminal, among other new facilities, through the so-called Rhein-Main Transition Program which was initiated in support of the total closure of Rhein-Main Air Base on 30 December 2005 and transferring all its former capacities to Ramstein Air Base (70%) and Spangdahlem Air Base (30%).

Ramstein served as temporary housing for the United States men's national soccer team during the 2006 World Cup. (Note: Mraz, Steve (2006-06-16). "U.S. soccer team at Ramstein as match with Italy draws near". Stars and Stripes.)

=== Name changes ===
- Landstuhl Air Base, 5 August 1952
- Ramstein Air Base, 1 June 1953

Landstuhl and Ramstein were separate bases until 1 December 1957

- Ramstein–Landstuhl Air Base, 1 December 1957
- Ramstein Air Base, 15 August 1958 – present

=== Major USAF units assigned ===
Source: Fletcher, Air Force Bases, Volume II (Note: Fletcher, Harry R. (1993). Air Force Bases, Vol. II, Air Bases Outside the United States of America (PDF). Reference Series. Washington, D.C.: Center for Air Force History. pp. 144–146. ISBN 978-0-912799-53-7.)

- 86th Air Base Group, 5 April 1952 – 14 November 1968

86th Wing (various designations), 21 August 1952 – 18 November 1960; 31 January 1973 – present
(86th Air Base Group (later under various designations) assigned as subordinate unit, 21 August 1952)
86th Air Division, 18 November 1960 – 14 November 1968

- 7030th Combat Support Group, 6 April 1953 – 1 May 1960

7030th Air Base Wing, 5 October 1966 – 14 June 1985

- Twelfth Air Force, 27 April 1953 – 1 January 1958
- 7486th Air Defense Group, 1 May 1954 – 25 September 1957
- 322d Air Division, 22 March 1954 – 12 August 1955

322d Airlift Division, 23 June 1978 – 1 April 1992

- 7455th Tactical Intelligence Wing, 1 September 1985 – 1 July 1992
- Seventeenth Air Force, 15 November 1959 – 7 October 1972; 1 October 2008 – 24 April 2012
- HQ, Atlantic Air Rescue Center (various designations), 8 October 1961 – 30 June 1973
- 26th Tactical Reconnaissance Wing, 5 October 1966 – 31 January 1973
- HQ, USAFE, 10 March 1973 – present
- 306th Strategic Wing, 15 August 1976 – 30 June 1978
- 7th Air Division, 1 July 1978 – 1 February 1992
- 316th Air Division, 14 June 1985 – 1 May 1991
- NHQ119 Civil Air Patrol – Ramstein Cadet Squadron – Unit 3395, 1984 – present
- 377th Combat Support Wing, 14 June 1985 – 1 May 1991
- 435th Air Base Wing, 15 January 2004 – 16 July 2009
- 435th Air Ground Operations Wing, 16 July 2009–present
- 38th Combat Support Wing, 24 May 2005 – 30 June 2007
- 521st Air Mobility Operations Wing, 4 September 2008 – present

=== Major U.S. Army units assigned ===
Source: Fletcher, Air Force Bases, Volume II

- 21st TSC / 39th Movement Control BN. (2008 – Present)
- USAREUR Movement Control Team / AMC Logistic Center
- USAREUR Overseas Replacement Center — Contingency Operations / AMC Passenger Terminal

=== Operational history ===
==== 86th Wing ====
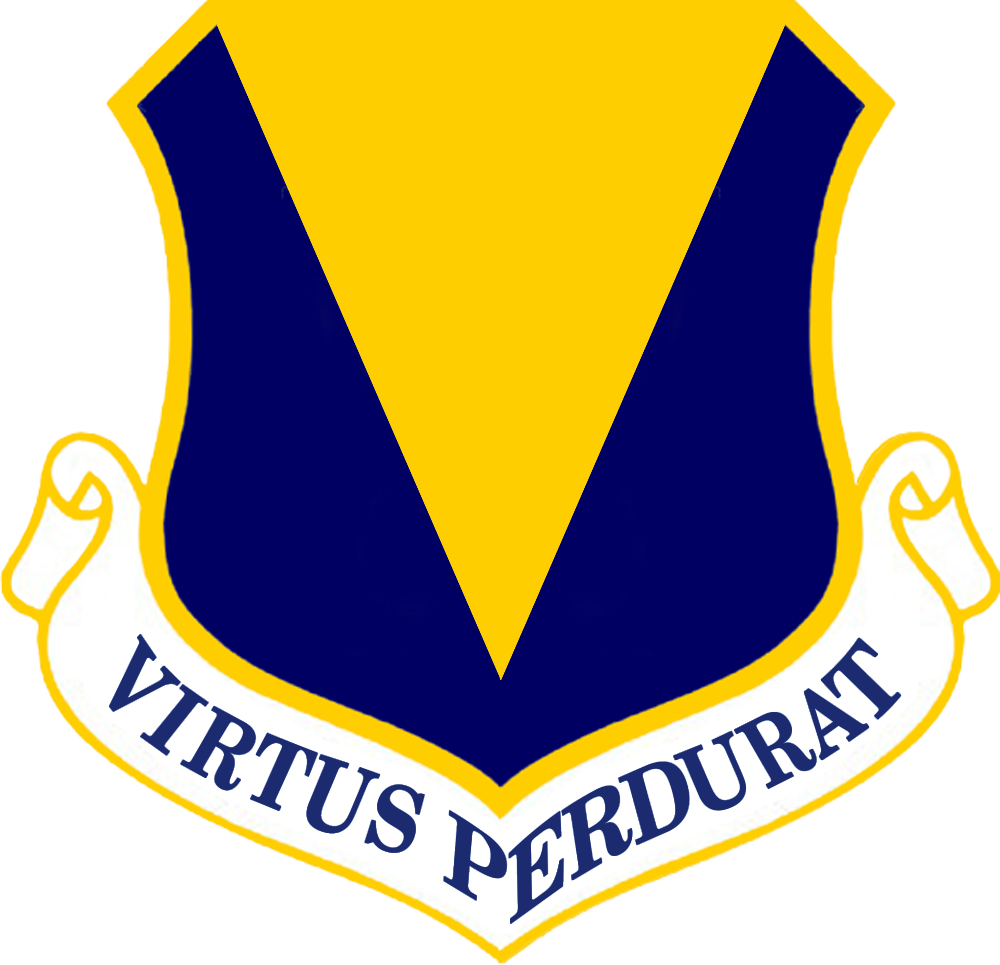

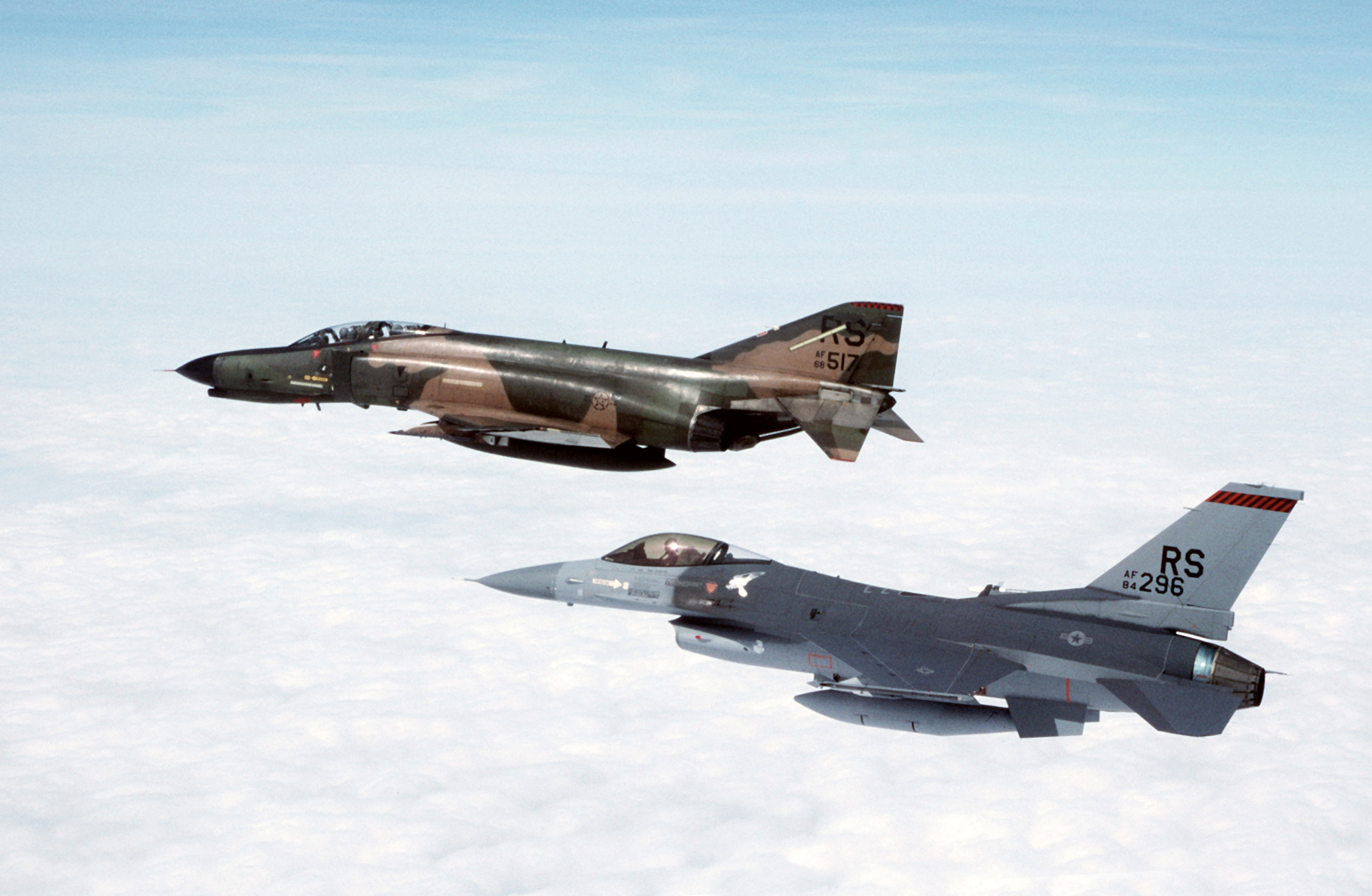
McDonnell Douglas F-4E Phantom II, and General Dynamics F-16C Fighting Falcon, of the 526th TFS/86th TFW, both displaying Ramstein 'RS' tailcode, 1985

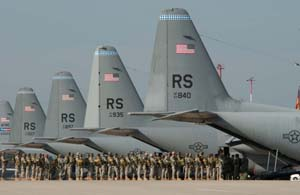
Lockheed C-130E Hercules of the 37th AS/86th Airlift Wing

Reassigned from Neubiberg Air Base, West Germany in 1952, except for a period between 1968 and 1973, the 86th Wing, under various designations, has been the main operational and host unit at Ramstein Air Base.

Throughout the 1950s, the 86th was primarily a Fighter-Bomber Wing. In 1960, it was realigned to an air defense mission and became the 86th Air Division (Defense). The 86th AD was inactivated in 1968. Returning as an F-4 Phantom II Tactical Fighter Wing in 1973, the 86th TFW performed that mission until 1994, deploying components to the Middle East during the 1990 Gulf War.

On 14 August 1976, the Strategic Air Command 306th Strategic Wing was activated at Ramstein with a KC-135 air refueling and an RC-135 reconnaissance mission. The 306th also functioned as the focal point for all SAC operations in Europe and as liaison between SAC and USAFE. The wing moved to RAF Mildenhall, England on 1 July 1978.

In June 1985, the 316th Air Division was activated, centralizing command authority at Ramstein. The 86 TFW became the division's flight operations arm, while the newly formed 377th Combat Support Wing, also activated in 1985, became responsible for the logistical and administrative support on base, replacing the 86th and 7030 Combat Support Wings. On 28 August 1988, Ramstein Air Base was the site of the tragic Ramstein airshow disaster, which killed 72 spectators and three pilots, and injured hundreds.

After the Cold War, the 86th was realigned to become the 86th Airlift Wing. On 1 July 1993, the 55th Aeromedical Airlift Squadron moved from the 435th AW at Rhein-Main Air Base Germany to Ramstein. On 1 October, the 75th and 76th Airlift Squadron arrived at Ramstein from the 60th AW at Travis Air Force Base California, and 437th AW at Charleston AFB South Carolina, respectively. A year later on 1 October 1994, the 37th Airlift Squadron was transferred to Ramstein from Rhein-Main.

In 1999, the activation of the 86th Contingency Response Group brought the airfield and aerial port operations and provision of force protection at contingency airfields mission to the wing.

On 24 May 2004, the 38th Combat Support Wing was activated to enhance support to USAFE geographically separated units. This wing was inactivated in 2007. The 521st Air Mobility Operations Wing was activated on 4 September 2008. The wing is the headquarters for the existing 721st Air Mobility Operations Group at Ramstein and the 521st AMOG at Naval Station Rota, Spain. The 521st AMOW provides an enhanced level of control for the AMC route structure in Europe, which includes critical locations for getting people, cargo and patients to and from current war zones.

By 1984, the Kindsbach Cave had become too small and its cost for renovation too high. The USAFE vacated the facility and, on 31 October 1993, control was returned to the German government and the German government returned the facility to the original owner of the land. Today, the Kindsbach Cave is private property, though tours of the cave can be arranged. The cave is overgrown by vegetation, trees, and new housing.

The new 521st Air Mobility Operations Wing stood up on 4 September 2008. (Note: Saldukas, Scott (2008-09-10). "Wing activation of the 521st AMOW". United States Air Force.) As of June 2020, the commander of the 521st AMOW is Colonel Adrienne Williams. (Note: "Adrienne L. Williams". United States Air Force. July 2021.)

In December 2023 a new Space Force component stands up at Ramstein Air Base.

==== 26th Tactical Reconnaissance Wing ====
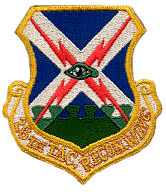

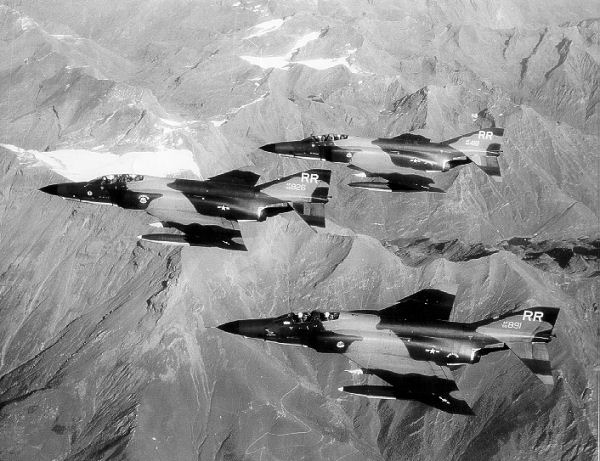
McDonnell RF-4C Phantom IIs of the 38th Tactical Reconnaissance Squadron, 26th TRW

On 7 March 1966, French President Charles de Gaulle announced that France would withdraw from NATO's integrated military structure. The United States was informed that it must remove its military forces from France by 1 April 1967.

As a result, the 26th Tactical Reconnaissance Wing, based at Toul-Rosieres Air Base, France, and two of its squadrons, the 38th and 32d, equipped with the RF-4C Phantom II, were relocated to Ramstein on 5 October 1966.

Assigned squadrons of the 26th TRW at Ramstein were:

- 38th Tactical Reconnaissance (RF-4C, Tail Code: RR)
- 526th Fighter Interceptor/Tactical Fighter (F-102/F-4E (1970) Tail Code: RS)
- 7th Special Operation (C-130, C-47, UH-1)

While at Ramstein, the 26th TRW acquired a number of other units with different flying missions. One function gained by the 26 TRW, almost immediately after arriving at Ramstein, was the maintenance and flying of the HQ USAFE liaison aircraft. In addition, the Wing was responsible for flying members of the HQ USAFE staff to Air Force and NATO bases throughout Europe. In addition, the 26th TRW was only designated as a flight, because of its small size. It consisted of a mixture of aircraft, including: T-29s, T-33s, T-39s, C-54s, O-2s, H-19s, and UH-1s.

In 1971 a detachment of the 630th Military Airlift Support Squadron from Rhein-Main Air Base was assigned to Ramstein and a large cargo aerial port constructed. This allowed Military Airlift Command C-141 and C-5 Galaxy aircraft to use Ramstein as a transshipment point for material, which was then moved within USAFE by C-130 tactical transports.

In the spring of 1972, the 7th Special Operations Squadron (SOS) was assigned flying C-130Es, C-47As, and UH-1Ns. Because of the special operations mission of the 7 SOS, it reported directly to HQ USAFE for operational control.

As part of operation "Creek Action", a command-wide effort to realign functions and streamline operations, HQ USAFE transferred the 26th TRW from Ramstein to Zweibrücken Air Base and the 86th Tactical Fighter Wing was reassigned from Zweibrücken to Ramstein on 31 January 1973.

=== NATO command center ===
From its inception, Ramstein was designed as a NATO command base. In 1957, Ramstein provided support for NATO's HQ Fourth Allied Tactical Air Force, which moved to Ramstein from Trier Air Base on 10 November 1957 upon the closure of that facility. Also on that date, HQ Twelfth Air Force was transferred to Bergstrom Air Force Base, Texas, and was assigned to Tactical Air Command. It was replaced by HQ Seventeenth Air Force (USAFE) which was moved from North Africa. In turn, the 17th AF was replaced by its mother unit HQ USAFE from Lindsey Air Station, Wiesbaden, West Germany in 1973. The HQ 17th AF was moved to Sembach AB at that time and controlled all USAF Air Divisions and Wings north of the Alps, with the exception of the British Isles and Scandinavia, which were controlled by HQ 3rd AF at Mildenhall.

On 31 January 1973, several headquarters were relocated into and out of Ramstein, when Seventeenth AF moved to Sembach Air Base to make room for the expected move of HQ USAFE to Ramstein. This entire operation, code-named "Creek Action", was carried out as part of the USAF's new worldwide policy of locating the most vital headquarters in thinly populated rural areas rather than near cities. Later, HQ USAFE was moved, due to the fact that US Intelligence found that the Soviets had plans to invade Western Europe through the Fulda Gap in West Germany. The military thought to move vital HQs the western bank of the Rhine for protection.

As a result of this policy change, Ramstein air base became a large multi-national NATO center: in addition to the USAFE's headquarters, it also housed the new NATO headquarters of the Allied Air Forces Central Europe (AAFCE).

The AAFCE also commanded the 2nd Allied Tactical Air Force (2ATAF) and the 4th ATAF. The 4th ATAF, which had been headquartered at Ramstein for many years, included the 1st Canadian Air Group, 1st and 2nd Divisions of the West German Air Force, and units of the USAFE's 3rd and 17th Air Force. HQ USAFE fully completed its move from Wiesbaden to Ramstein in early 1991.

With USAFE's arrival in 1973, Ramstein entered a period of expansion. The dual commander of the 316th AD / 86 TFW became host commander of Americans living in the Kaiserslautern Military Community instead of the US Army 21st Commanding General. The Wiesbaden USAF Community was then traded to US Army Control for an even switch. The KMC from the 1950s to the early 1990s had an average population of 110,000 Americans, outnumbering the Germans in Kaiserslautern during that period.

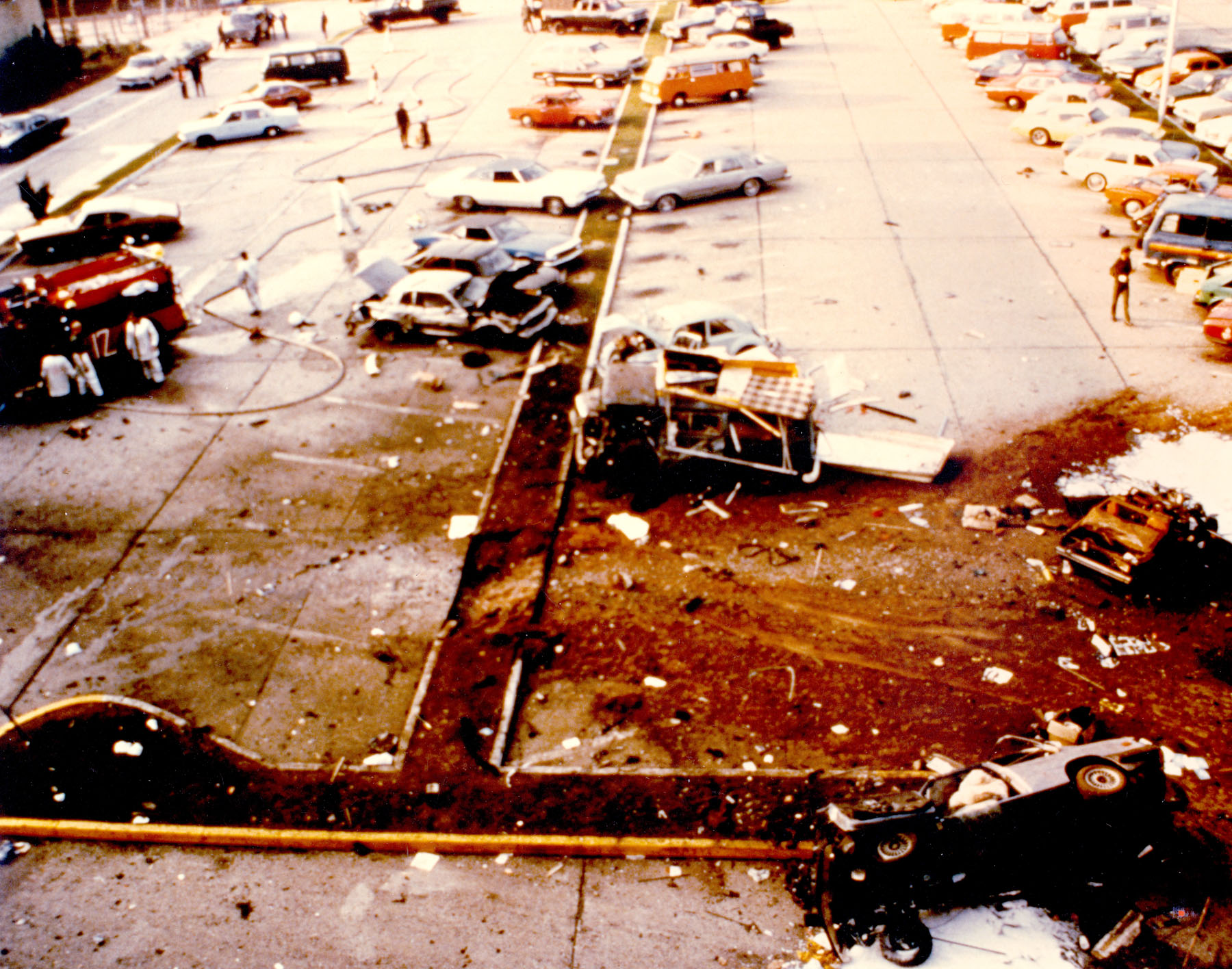
Aftermath of the Red Army Faction (RAF) bombing attack of the U.S. Air Forces Europe headquarters at Ramstein Air Base, West Germany (1981).

Allied Air Forces Central Europe was established at Ramstein on 28 June 1974. Ramstein subsequently provided support for other headquarters including the 322nd Airlift Division that arrived on 23 June 1978, and SAC's 7th Air Division that arrived on 1 July 1978. In December 1980, HQ Fourth Allied Tactical Air Force was moved from Ramstein to Heidelberg and co-located with HQ Central Army Group.

In 1984, an enlisted airman (Sgt Darrel Dietlein), assigned to the 1964th Communications Group, solicited National Headquarters Civil Air Patrol to charter the first "Cadet Squadron" in West Germany, naming the unit "Ramstein Cadet Squadron" and becoming the unit's first commander as a CAP First Lieutenant. The Ramstein Cadet Squadron was formed with Captain Mark Bailey serving as the unit's first liaison officer, as well as other like minded military volunteers and roughly six cadets. To this day, the squadron enjoys vibrant member participation, as well as base support, hosting the European Encampments along with their traditional military studies, cadet programs and aerospace education efforts. The Ramstein Cadet Squadron commander as of February 2022 is 1st Lt Cody Chenowith. The squadron is the central hub for all CAP units in Europe. Membership as of April 2024 was 55 members. In subsequent years, a companion cadet squadron was formed at Spangdahlem Air Base. Distance learning cadets are located at SHAPE, Belgium and Hohenfels, Germany. Additionally, the Ramstein Cadet Squadron is the second oldest and continuous operating unit on the installation and even predating the 86th Air Wing.

Today, the base is home to the Allied Air Command, which is responsible to Joint Force Command Brunssum, the only and main NATO command unit on Ramstein AB.

=== ADOC Kindsbach ===
Close to Ramstein was the site of Air Defense Operations Center (ADOC) — Kindsbach, AKA 'Kindsbach Cave' – the site of Europe's underground combat operations center.

The facility was located in a former German western front command headquarters. The French took control of the underground bunker after World War II, and USAFE assumed control in 1953. After major renovations, USAFE opened the center on 15 August 1954.

The center was a state-of-the-art, 67-room, 3,400-square-metre (37,000 sq ft) facility where USAFE could have led an air war against the Soviet Union. The center had a digital computer to work out bombing problems, cryptographic equipment for coded message traffic and its own photo lab to develop reconnaissance photos. Responsible for an air space extending deep behind the Iron Curtain, the center interacted directly with The Pentagon, NATO, Supreme Headquarters Allied Powers Europe and all USAFE bases. With its massive telephone switchboard and 80 teletype machines, the cave was well connected to the world, receiving more than 1,000 calls a day.

As a further measure of protection, the cave was fully self-contained with its own water supply, electric backup-generators, climate controls, dining facilities and sleeping accommodations for its 125-man crew. Visitor passes were rarely issued to this secret facility.

Throughout the years, leadership changed but USAFE led the operations through numbered Air Forces. The center's commander was the USAFE Advanced Echelon. The glassed-in office was on the top floor of the three-story underground command center. Directly under the office was the management for offensive air operations. And the bottom floor office was the management for defensive air operations – to include support for U.S. Army forces and West German Civil Defense. All three offices had a full view of the massive Air Operations Center map on the opposing wall.

The AOC was the largest room in the complex. Its three-story map was used to plot minute-by-minute movements of friendly and unidentified aircraft. But the center was much more than just a tracking station, because it could also react to threats. They always knew the current operational status of air weapons in theater including missiles, and could dispatch armed response "at a moment's notice".

By the early 1960s, the manual plotting system used to track aircraft at the cave and elsewhere throughout West Germany was too slow and inaccurate for the quick responses necessary. Beginning in 1962, airmen trained in the new 412L air weapons control system began to arrive in Germany and at the cave. Over the next year, the new GE semi-automatic system was installed. When complete at the cave, the current air picture over East and West Germany, as well as parts of the Soviet bloc, was displayed on a 12-by-12-metre (40 ft × 40 ft) screen with radar information provided by various 412L sites located throughout West Germany. Senior U.S. staff monitored the dynamic display 24/7. Over the next several years, additional 412L sites throughout Germany joined the network, until the manual system had been totally replaced.

=== Drone war control center ===
In April 2015, Ramstein Air Base was reported by German and international media as an important control center in the drone war staged under the Obama administration against targets in areas like Pakistan, Yemen, Afghanistan and Somalia. (Note: Scahill, Jeremy (2015-04-17). "Germany is the Tell-Tale Heart of America's Drone War". The Intercept.) (Note: "Germany's Ramstein airbase 'heart' of US drone program". Deutsche Welle. 2015-04-18.) The German government claimed not to have been informed about this function of the U.S. base.

In a TV and online documentary, the German Das Erste channel cited 2014 reports from Norddeutscher Rundfunk, WDR, and the Süddeutsche Zeitung that revealed Ramstein to be an important hub in the drone war against terror suspects. New data, provided by Edward Snowden affiliate Glenn Greenwald, supported these reports with classified documents from inside the U.S. administration and were also presented in the Citizenfour video documentary. (Note: "Wie von Deutschland aus der Kampf gegen den Terror gesteuert wird" [How the fight against Terror is controlled from Germany]. lernzeit.de (in German). 2019-02-19.) The revelation of US drone activities from Ramstein lead to nationwide anti-drone protests under the banner of "Stop Ramstein Air Base". (Note: "Ramstein Air Base anti-drone protests: The Germans taking on the US military". Deutsche Welle.)

In 2019, three Yemenis who lost relatives in a 2012 US drone strike took legal action against the German government for aiding the breaking of international law by the United States, by tolerating these operations from Ramstein. The German Higher Administrative Court in Münster ruled that the German government must take appropriate measures to control whether the US army follows international law at Ramstein Air Base. (Note: "Court hears case on Germany's role in US drone deaths in Yemen". Deutsche Welle.) However, the possibilities of Germany to control US activities on their territory are very limited as the United States has jurisdiction over Ramstein Air Base. (Note: "Berlin powerless to challenge US drone operations at Ramstein air base". Deutsche Welle.) In July 2025 the Federal Constitutional Court dismissed the case of two Yemenis who wanted the German government to monitor American Forces activities in Ramstein and put pressure on them to abide international law in global operations.

=== Illegal arms and munition transports ===
In 2015, the Serbian newspaper Večernje novosti reported about Ramstein Air Base being used by the United States Armed Forces to transport arms and munitions to Syria. (Note: Weißenborn, Michael (2017-09-13). ""Sag nichts, frag nicht"" ["Don't ask, don't tell"]. Stuttgarter Nachrichten (in German).) At the end of 2017, an anonymous U.S. official stated that the U.S. does, indeed, use Ramstein Air Base to supplement Syrian rebels with arms and munition. The German Federal Government stated that it did not grant the necessary permits for these transports, nor that it had been informed about them. (Note: Obermaier, Frederik; Krüger, Paul-Anton (2017-09-12). "Heikle Fracht aus Ramstein" [Tricky Freight from Ramstein]. Süddeutsche Zeitung (in German). ISSN 0174-4917.) The Kaiserslautern public prosecutor's office did not initiate any official investigations. She checked generally accessible sources, on which some of the press articles mentioned were based, and obtained information from the authorities involved in monitoring foreign trade. According to the review, there was "no evidence of concrete arms transports to Syria via Ramstein". However, the journalistic conclusion cannot be ruled out, according to the prosecution authority. Previous investigations of the Ramstein Air Base, such as the Abu Omar case, have proven to be unsuccessful. (Note: Obermaier, Frederik; Krüger, Paul-Anton (2017-09-20). "Millionen Schuss Munition für Kalaschnikows" [Million rounds of ammunition for Kalashnikovs]. Süddeutsche Zeitung (in German). ISSN 0174-4917.) If the investigations into the arms and ammunition transports had been successful, this would have constituted a violation of the German Kriegswaffenkontrollgesetz and the Foreign Trade and Payments Act. (Note: "War Weapons Control Act (Kriegswaffenkontrollgesetz, KrWaffKontrG)". German Law Archive. 2014-03-28.) (Note: "USA sollen syrische Rebellen über Ramstein mit Waffen versorgt haben" [The US is said to have supplied weapons to Syrian rebels via Ramstein]. Deutsche Welle (in German). 2017-09-13.)

=== Afghanistan Evacuation ===
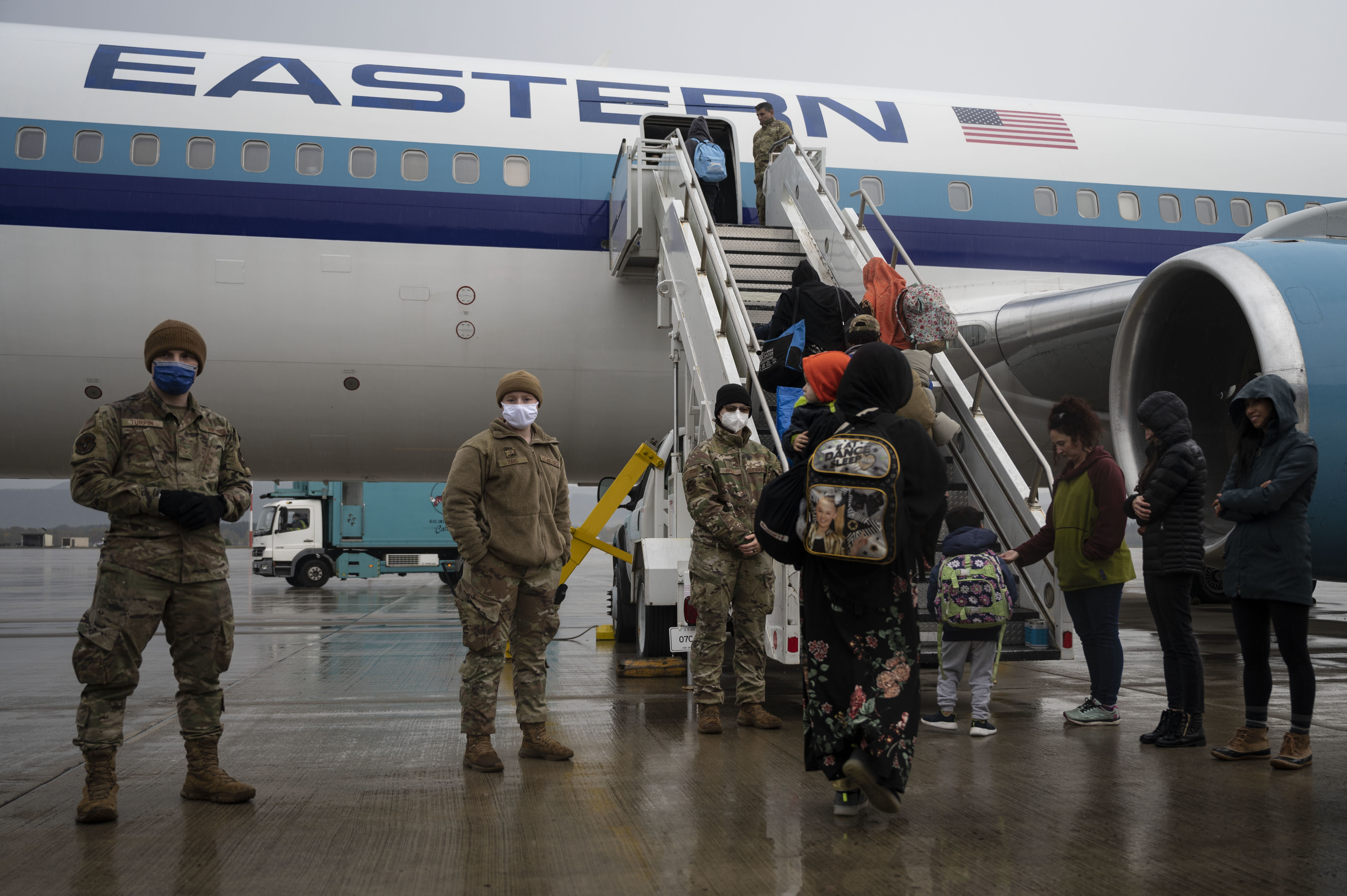
Afghan evacuees board their final flight from Ramstein Air Base in October 2021

In late Summer 2021, Ramstein Air Base became the transfer point for thousands of Afghan civilians fleeing Afghanistan following the fall of Kabul back into Taliban hands as U.S. and NATO forces withdrew from the country. Civilian airlines under the Civil Reserve Air Fleet, such as Delta, American, Eastern, and United were allowed to land at Ramstein and serve as flights to take Afghan families and other supporters of the U.S. and NATO forces to new lives in the United States. Those who had to stay on the base were cared for in makeshift living centers which were set up to tend to their needs until they could be processed and flown to the United States.

=== Russo-Ukrainian War ===
On 26 April 2022, Ramstein Air Base hosted a meeting of the International Advisory Group on Ukraine's Defense and Counteraction to Russia, convened by US Secretary of Defense Lloyd Austin to synchronize and coordinate Ukraine's military assistance in the war with Russia. The event was attended by the heads of defense agencies of 42 countries. The meeting was attended by Minister of Defense of Ukraine Oleksii Reznikov. (Note: "Nimetsʹkyy parlament pidtrymav postachannya vazhkoho ozbroyennya Ukrayini" Німецький парламент підтримав постачання важкого озброєння Україні [The German parliament has supported the supply of heavy weapons to Ukraine]. Radio Free Europe/Radio Liberty (in Ukrainian). 2022-04-28.)

The participating countries agreed on financial assistance to Ukraine and the supply of "heavy" weapons. They also allowed Ukraine to strike at Russian strategic sites with Western weapons. The next meetings are planned to be held monthly. (Note: "40 krayin proty Putina. Pidsumky zustrichi na aviabazi u Ramshtayni" 40 країн проти Путіна. Підсумки зустрічі на авіабазі у Рамштайні [40 countries against Putin. Results of the meeting at the air base in Ramstein]. Главком (in Ukrainian). 2022-04-27.)

A 2 Squadron RAAF E-7A Wedgetail was based at Ramstein from October 2023, for a six-month deployment to supplement NATO AEW&C under Operation Kudu. The Wedgetail returned to Australia in April 2024. In July 2025, a RAAF Wedgetail was deployed to Lask Air Base in Poland, returning to Australia in November.

== Facilities ==
=== Airfield ===
Ramstein Air Base consists of two runways — 09/27 and 08/26 — two large aprons, one near a hangar north of Runways 27 and 26, and one to the north of 09 and 08. The north-western apron also has a small passenger terminal with two jetways. This means the air base is capable of joint-use operations, although currently there are no scheduled airlines running flights to and from Ramstein.

=== Schools ===
There are four schools at Ramstein Air Base: Ramstein Elementary School (grades PreK–2), Ramstein Intermediate School (grades 3–5), Ramstein American Middle School (grades 6–8), and Ramstein High School (grades 9–12). All of these schools are run by DoDDS, a component of DoDEA.

== Role and operations ==
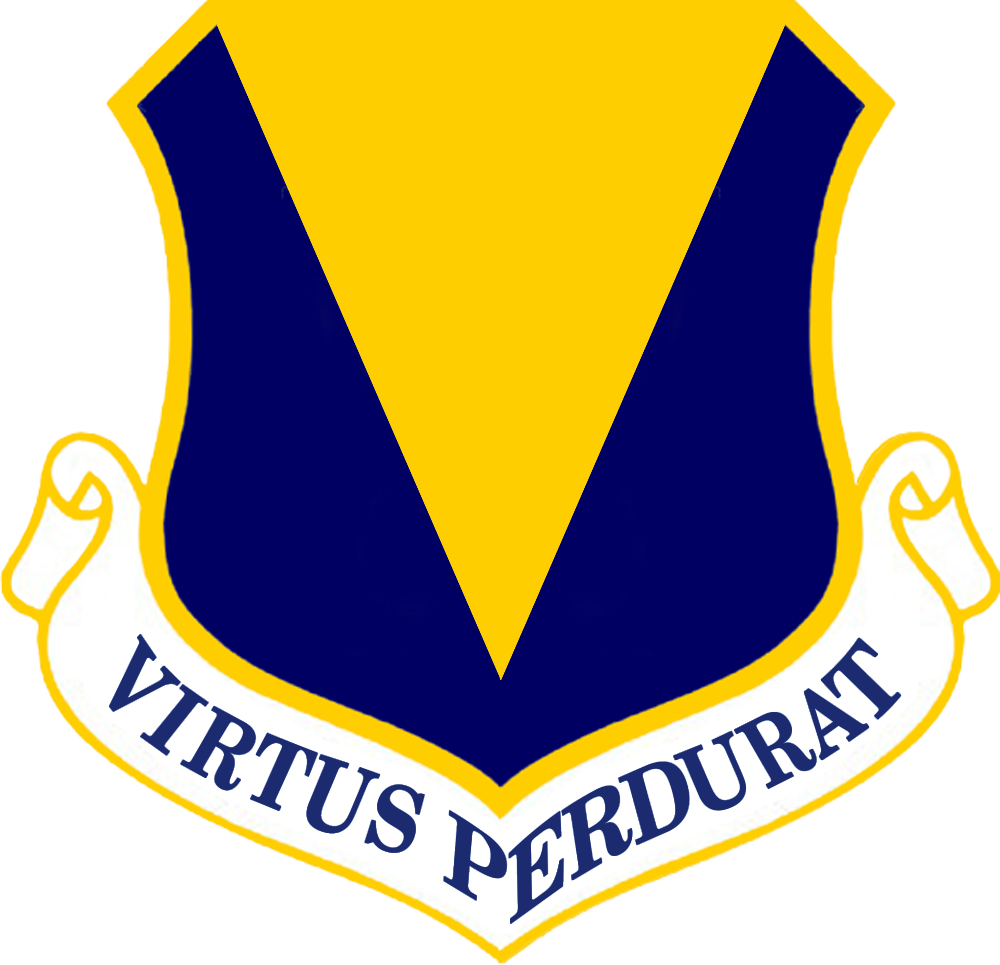

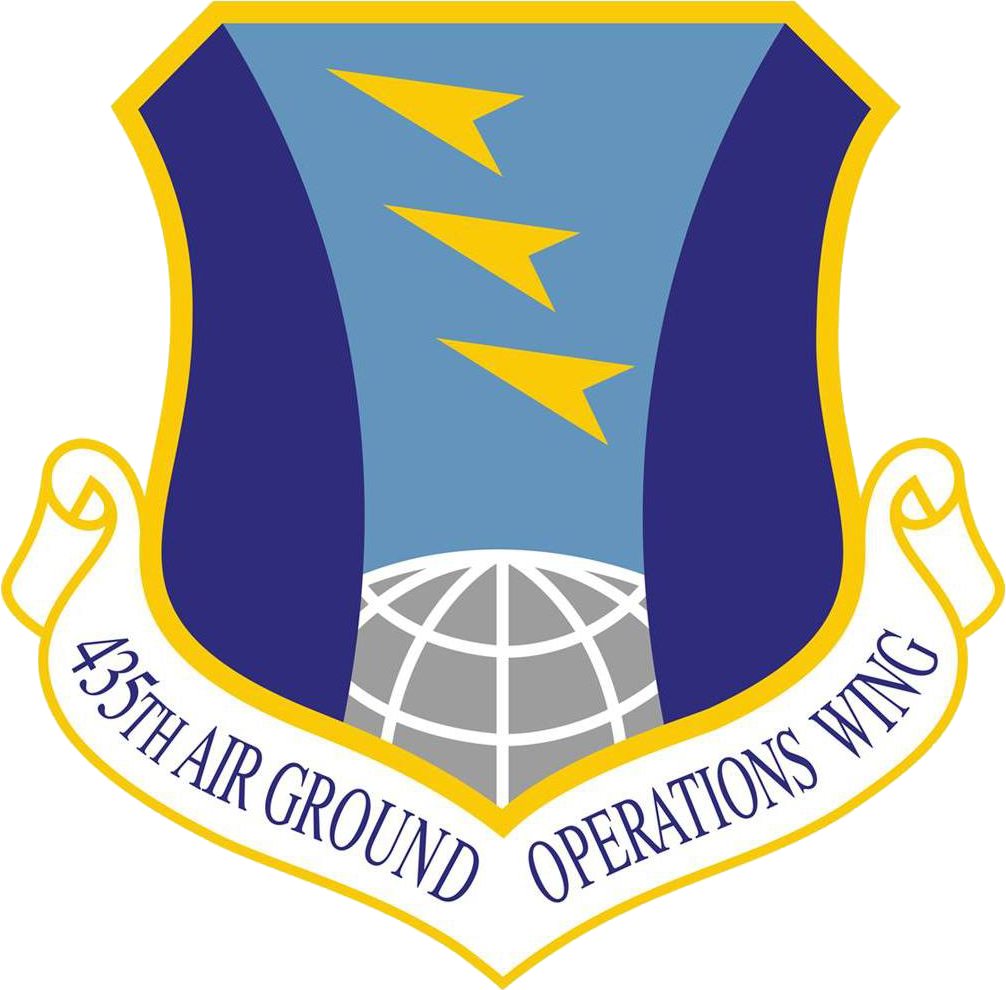

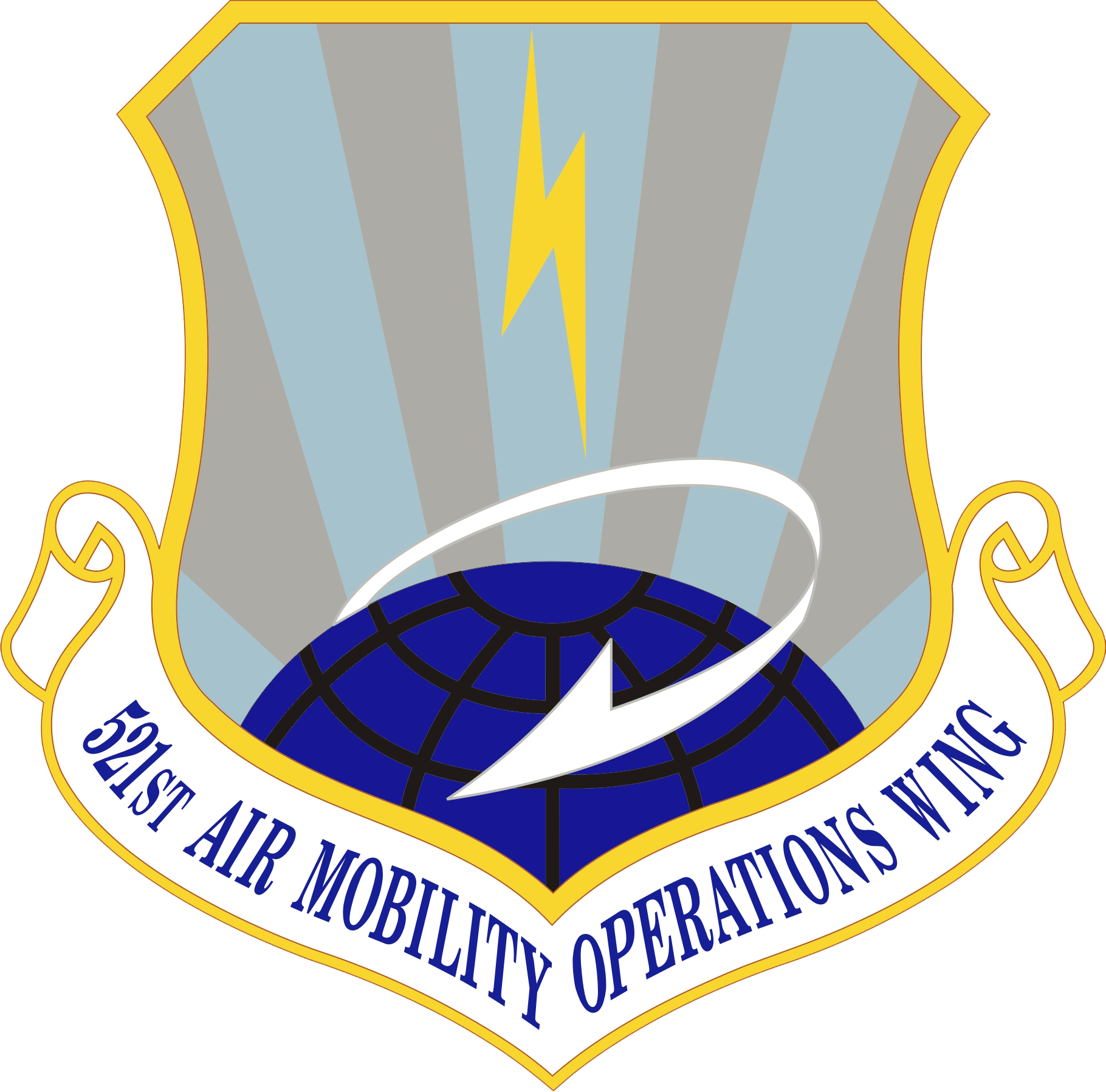

The host unit is the 86th Airlift Wing (86 AW), commanded as of 15 July 2022 by Brigadier General Otis C. Jones. The 86th Airlift Wing is composed of six groups, 30 squadrons and four bases in Germany, Spain, the Azores, and Belgium. Its mission is the operation and maintenance of airlift assets consisting of C-130Js, C-21s, and C-37A Gulfstream aircraft throughout Europe, Africa and the Middle East.

Also at Ramstein is the 435th Air Ground Operations Wing (formerly the 435th Air Base Wing) (435 AGOW), which focuses on base-support responsibilities within the KMC. It is composed of five groups and 20 squadrons. The wing provides rapid mobility and agile combat support for military operations, and maintains expeditionary forces and infrastructure.

As of July 2021, the commander of the 435th AGOW is Colonel Bryan T. Callahan. (Note: "Bryan T. Callahan". United States Air Force. July 2021.)

Ramstein's wings are assigned to the headquarters 3rd Air Force also based at Ramstein AB that controls most of the USAF Wings throughout Europe.

There is often a Summer Camp to Ramstein from British CCF (RAF) and ATC cadets, as well as Civil Air Patrol encampments and tours like the ones held in July 2015 (Note: Plummer, Lane T. (2015-07-20). "CAP turns teens into cadets through summer training camp". United States Air Force.) and June 2016. (Note: Mayhugh, Tryphena (2016-06-24). "Civil Air Patrol cadets tour Ramstein".)

== Based units ==
Flying and notable non-flying units based at Ramstein Air Base. (Note: "Units". United States Air Force.) (Note: "Ramstein Gateway Reception Center". United States Army.) (Note: "Headquarters". Allied Air Command.) (Note: "480th ISR Wing". United States Air Force. April 2021.)

Units marked GSU are Geographically Separate Units, which although based at Ramstein, are subordinate to a parent unit based at another location.

=== United States Air Force ===
United States Air Forces in Europe – Air Forces Africa (USAFE-AFAFRICA)

- Headquarters United States Air Forces in Europe — Air Forces Africa
- Third Air Force
  - Headquarters Third Air Force
  - 86th Airlift Wing
    - 86th Operations Group
      - 37th Airlift Squadron — C-130J Hercules
      - 76th Airlift Squadron — C-21A, C-37A
      - 86th Aeromedical Evacuation Squadron
      - 86th Operational Support Squadron
    - 86th Civil Engineer Group
      - 786th Civil Engineer Squadron
    - 86th Logistics Readiness Group
    - 86th Maintenance Group
    - 86th Medical Group
    - 86th Mission Support Group
      - 786th Force Support Squadron
  - 406th Air Expeditionary Wing
  - 435th Air Ground Operations Wing
    - 4th Air Support Operations Group
      - 2nd Air Support Operations Squadron
      - 7th Combat Weather Squadron
    - 435th Air and Space Communications Group
      - 1st Air & Space Communications Operations Squadron
      - 1st Combat Communications Squadron
      - 1st Communications Maintenance Squadron
    - 435th Contingency Response Group
      - 435th Construction and Training Squadron
      - 435th Contingency Response Squadron
      - 435th Contingency Response Support Squadron
      - 435th Security Forces Squadron

Air Combat Command (ACC)

- Sixteenth Air Force
  - 480th Intelligence, Surveillance and Reconnaissance Wing
    - 693rd Intelligence, Surveillance and Reconnaissance Group (GSU)
      - 24th Intelligence Squadron
      - 402nd Intelligence Squadron
      - 450th Intelligence Squadron
      - 693rd Intelligence Support Squadron

Air Mobility Command (AMC)

- United States Air Force Expeditionary Center
  - 521st Air Mobility Operations Wing
    - 721st Air Mobility Operations Group
      - 10th Expeditionary Aeromedical Evacuation Flight
      - 313th Expeditionary Operations Support Squadron
      - 721st Aerial Port Squadron
      - 721st Aircraft Maintenance Squadron

=== United States Army ===
United States Army Europe and Africa (USAREUR-AF)

- 21st Theater Sustainment Command
  - Ramstein Army Reception Center (RARC)

=== United States Space Force ===
United States Space Forces – Europe and Africa (USSPACEFOR-EURAF)

=== NATO ===
Supreme Headquarters Allied Powers Europe (SHAPE)

- Allied Air Command (AIRCOM)

== In popular culture ==
=== Fictional entities ===
- Lois Lane was born at Ramstein Air Base despite the base opening in 1948 and Lane debuting in 1938. (Note: Byrne, John (w), Byrne, John (p), Beatty, John (i). "The Power That Failed!" Superman, vol. 2, no. 19, p. 2/6 (July 1988). DC Comics.)

=== In films ===
- Ramstein was the location where Colonel Masters is taken after being rescued by his son in Iron Eagle (1986).
- Ramstein was the location of the aborted landing of Air Force One when it is hijacked by a group of terrorists in Air Force One (1997). Rickenbacker Air National Guard Base stood in for Ramstein as the film was shot mostly in the state of Ohio.
- Ramstein was the location where Ethan Hunt and his team are given a second chance to retrieve stolen plutonium in Mission: Impossible – Fallout (2018)

=== In games ===
- Ramstein Air Base appears in the video game Tom Clancy's EndWar as a possible battlefield. In the game, NATO has since collapsed, and the base is controlled by the European Federation.
- In Call of Duty: Modern Warfare 3, Ramstein Air Base suffers a surprise invasion by Russian Ground Forces after a gas attack.
- In Wargame: European Escalation, one mission of the NATO campaign takes place in the base.

=== In literature ===
- Both Ramstein Air Force Base and the Ramstein air disaster figure as plot points in Donna Leon's second Guido Brunetti novel, Death in a Strange Country (1993)
- The base was mentioned in Walter Dean Myers' book Sunrise over Fallujah.

=== In music ===
- Rammstein, a German metal band formed in 1994, have stated that they take their name from the Ramstein air show disaster; in turn, the asteroid 110393 Rammstein is named after the band. The band's self-titled song (on the album Herzeleid (1995)) refers to the event.

=== In television ===
- In The West Wing episode "Memorial Day", Donna Moss is flown to Ramstein to be treated at Landstuhl Regional Medical Center nearby.
- In The West Wing episode "Red Haven's on Fire", Air Force Veteran Leo McGarry refers to "Ramstein Air Force Base".
- In the pilot of Homeland, Marine Sergeant Nicholas Brody is debriefed in Ramstein after being rescued from an al-Qaeda base in Iraq.
- In the Madam Secretary episode "The Seventh Floor", journalist Colin Mitchell is flown to Ramstein after being released by the Sudanese government.
- In Law & Order: Special Victims Unit, chief medical examiner Melinda Warner reveals in season 7's "Blast" that she served on the base in the U.S. Air Force during the Gulf War.
- In the Pantheon episode "Joey Coupet", businessman-turned-uploaded intelligence Stephen Holstrom breaches the U.S. military internet through Ramstein Air Base, ramming a self-driving car through a checkpoint so that a hard drive with him on it can be found and analysed by security.

== Accidents and incidents ==
=== Red Army Faction car bombing, 31 August 1981 ===
The U.S. Air Forces in Europe (USAFE) headquarters became the target of a bombing attack at 07:21 on 31 August 1981, carried out by a Red Army Faction commando called "Sigurd Debus". A total of 20 victims were injured, some seriously. (Note: Ortiz, Elizabeth. "20th anniversary of USAFE headquarters bombing observed". dcmilitary.com. Comprint Military Publications.)

=== Ramstein air show disaster, 28 August 1988 ===
The Ramstein air show disaster was a mid-air collision that occurred during the Flugtag '88 air show on Sunday, 28 August 1988, killing 3 pilots from the display team, plus an additional 67 spectators on the ground.

=== Lockheed C-5 Galaxy crash, 29 August 1990 ===
On 29 August 1990, a C-5 Galaxy transport plane had just taken-off from Ramstein AB when a thrust reverser on one of the engines suddenly deployed, causing it to crash immediately after leaving the runway. Eight crew and five of the nine passengers on board were killed.

=== Environmental scandal ===
In 2014, it was revealed that toxic extinguishing foams (PFCs) were used on Ramstein Air Base and other U.S. air bases in the region. These are now contaminating lakes, rivers and the ground water in the region. In one river, the contamination was 7700 times higher than the safety limit set by the European Union. (Note: Hammermann, Katharina (2014-11-09). "Gefährliches Erbe des US-Militärs: Rings um rheinland-pfälzische Luftwaffenstützpunkte sind Gewässer mit krebserregenden Stoffen verunreinigt" [Dangerous legacy of the US military: waters around Rhineland-Palatinate air force bases are contaminated with carcinogenic substances]. Trierischer Volksfreund (in German).) These foams are linked to cancer and birth defects. (Note: Copp, Tara (2018-04-26). "DoD: At least 126 bases report water contaminants linked to cancer, birth defects". Military Times.)

== See also ==
- List of United States Air Force installations
