= 435th Security Forces Squadron =

435th Security Forces Squadron

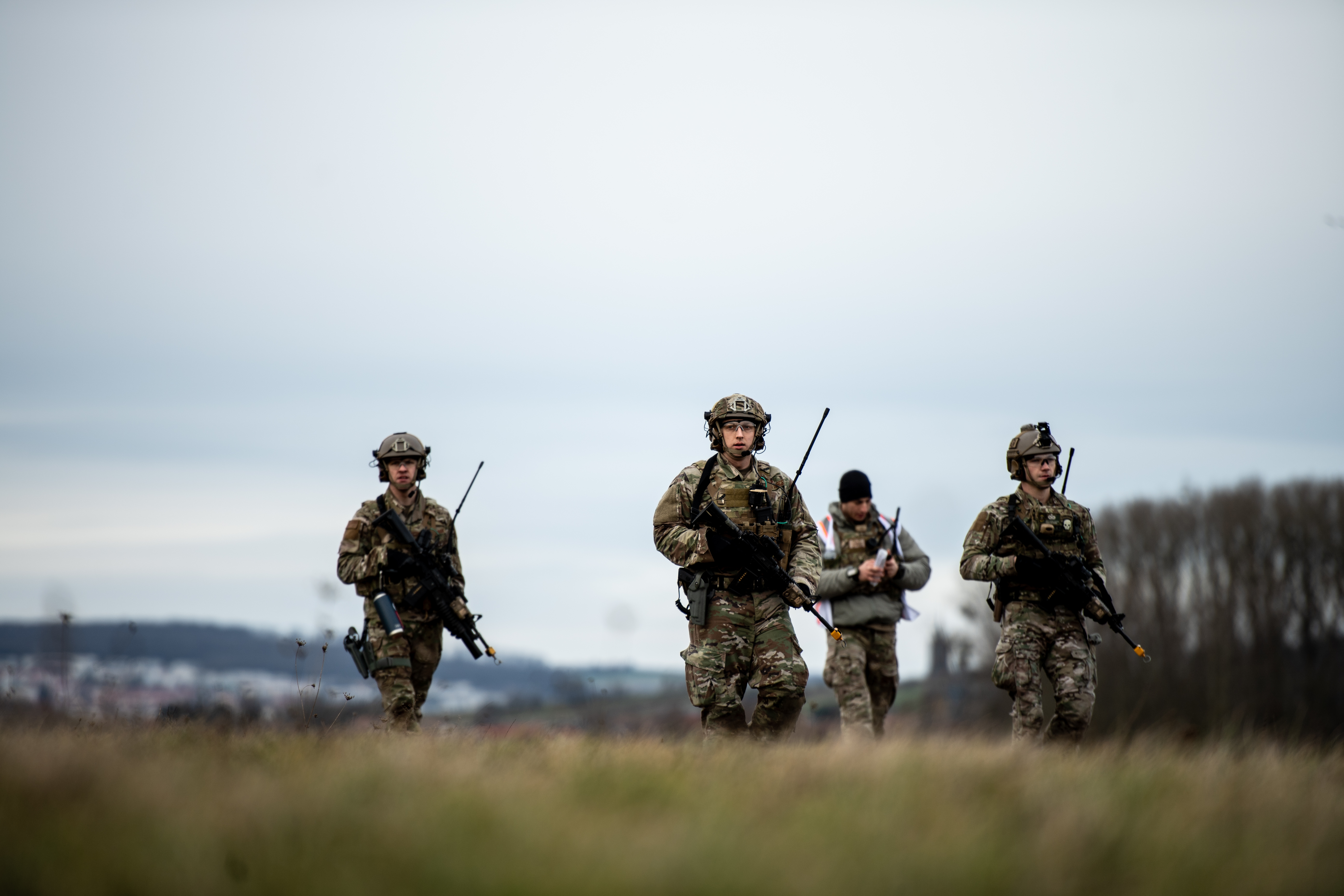
- Squadron members perform a sweep on an airfield during an exercise at the former RCAF Station Grostenquin, France in 2020
- Active: 1950–1952; 1952–1963; 1975–1995; 2004–present
- Country: United States
- Branch: United States Air Force
- Role: Security Forces
- Part of: United States Air Forces in Europe – Air Forces Africa: Third Air Force; 435th Air Ground Operations Wing; 435th Contingency Response Group
- Garrison/HQ: Ramstein Air Base, Germany
- Nickname: Defenders of the Gateway
- Mottos: Live to fight, fight to live.
- Decorations: Air Force Outstanding Unit Award (17x) Joint Meritorious Unit Award

Insignia
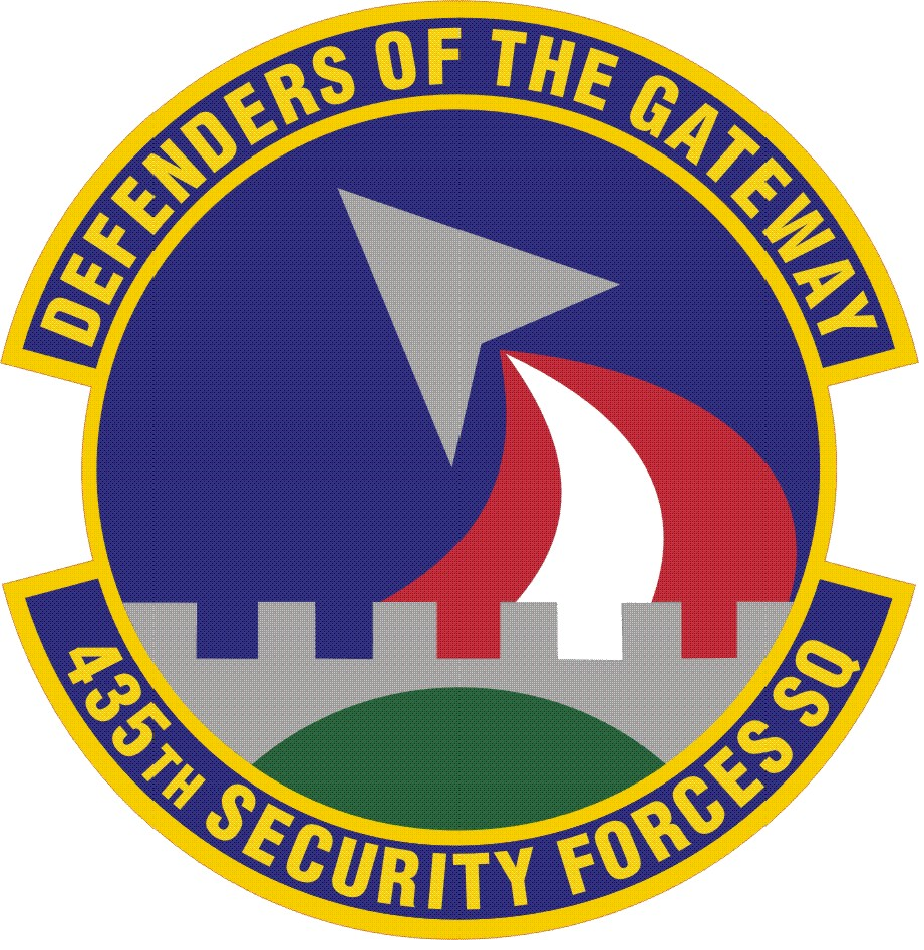
- 435th Security Forces Squadron emblem (approved 17 January 2006)

The 435th Security Forces Squadron (435 SFS) is an airborne-capable United States Air Force Security Forces squadron based at Pulaski Barracks Army Installation, Germany. The 435th Security Forces Squadron's mission is to secure, protect and defend Air Force weapons systems, air base assets, personnel, and resources. The squadron was most recently activated at Ramstein Air Base, Germany, on 15 January 2004.

== Lineage ==
- Constituted as the 435 Air Police Squadron on 8 September 1950

Activated in the reserve on 22 October 1950
Ordered into active service on 1 March 1951
Inactivated on 1 December 1952

- Activated in the reserve on 1 December 1952

Inactivated on 17 January 1963

- Redesignated 435th Security Police Squadron

Activated on 1 July 1975
Inactivated on 1 April 1995

- Converted to provisional status and designated 435th Expeditionary Security Forces Squadron on 5 February 2001

Returned to permanent status on 10 December 2003

- Redesignated 435th Security Forces Squadron on 15 December 2003

Activated on 15 January 2004

=== Assignments ===
- 435th Air Base Group, 22 October 1950 – 1 December 1952
- 435th Air Base Group, 1 December 1952 – 17 January 1963
- 435th Combat Support Group (later 435th Support Group), 1 July 1975 – 1 April 1995
- 435th Security Police Group, 15 January 2004
- 435th Mission Support Group, 3 May 2005
- 435th Contingency Response Group, 16 July 2009 – present

=== Stations ===
- Miami International Airport, 22 October 1950 – 1 December 1952
- Miami International Airport, 1 December 1952
- Homestead Air Force Base, 25 July 1960 – 17 January 1963
- Rhein Main Air Base, Germany, 1 July 1975 – 1 April 1995
- Ramstein Air Base, Germany, 15 January 2004
- Pulaski Barracks Army Installation, Germany, 30 April 2013 – present
