= 1st Combat Communications Squadron =

- 1st Combat Communications Squadron Insignia
- Active: 1952 – present
- Country: United States
- Branch: United States Air Forces in Europe (USAFE)
- Role: Combat Communications
- Size: Squadron
- Part of: 435th Air Ground Operations Wing
- Garrison/HQ: Ramstein Air Base, Germany
- Nickname(s): Combat Comm, 1st CCS, 1st Mob, First Mob, 1st Comm, First Comm, 1CCGP, 1CISG
- Motto(s): "First In - Last Out"

The 1st Combat Communications Squadron is a military communications unit of the United States Air Force. It is part of the 435th Air Ground Operations Wing, United States Air Forces in Europe. It is located at Ramstein Air Base, Germany.

The squadron traces its history to the constitution of the 1st Airways and Air Communications Service Squadron, Mobile, on 28 January 1952, and its subsequent activation on 1 March 1952 at Johnson Air Base, Japan, as part of the 1808th Airways and Air Communications Service Wing, Airways and Air Communications Service, USAF. After a number of changes, the then-1st Mobile Communications Group arrived at Lindsey ASN, West Germany, in January 1976, thereafter being assigned to the European Communications Area.

Today the squadron's mission is to provide rapidly-deployable communications and air traffic control services throughout Europe, Africa, and the Middle East. The unit also supports training exercises, deployments, contingencies, and special military projects for the Joint Chiefs of Staff, the North Atlantic Treaty Organization, United States European Command, the Department of State, and the United Nations, as directed by United States Air Forces in Europe. In many cases, the unit's mission requires its members to be some of the first US forces to arrive at an operating location. Because of the nature of the operation and the services the unit provides, unit members are frequently among the last personnel to leave. Hence the motto, "First In--Last Out."

The squadron was the Air Force's Major General Harold M. McClelland Large Unit of the Year Award winner for 2017.

== Lineage and previous designations ==
- Redesignated - 1st Combat Communications Squadron on 31 Jul 1991
- Redesignated - 1st Combat Communications Group on 1 Oct 1986
- Redesignated - 1st Combat Information Systems Group on 15 Oct 1984
- Redesignated - 1st Combat Communications Group on 1 Jan 1981
- Redesignated - 1st Combat Communications Squadron on 24 Mar 1976
- Redesignated - 1st Mobile Communications Group on 15 Jan 1975
- Redesignated - 1st Mobile Communications Squadron on 1 Jul 1974
- Redesignated - 1st Mobile Communications Group on 1 Oct 1961
- Redesignated - 1st Mobile Communications Squadron on 1 Jul 1961
- Activated - 1st Airways and Air Communications Service Squadron, Mobile on 1 Mar 1952.
- Constituted - 1st Airways and Air Communications Service Squadron, Mobile on 28 Jan 1952.

== Bases stationed ==
- Ramstein Air Base, Germany, c. 1 July 1994 - to present
- Sembach Air Base, Germany, 1 October 1992
- Lindsey Air Station, Germany, 1 February 1976
- Robins Air Force Base, Georgia, United States, 15 January 1975 – 1 February 1976
- Clark Air Base, Philippines, 1 August 1961 – 15 January 1975
- Johnson Air Base (later, Air Station), Japan, 1 March 1952

== Emblem ==
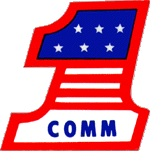
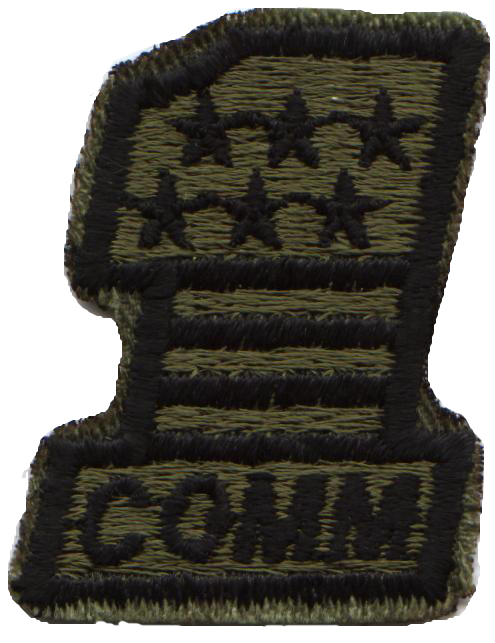

== Decorations ==

- Presidential Unit Citation (Southeast Asia): 1 Jan 1967 – 15 Feb 1968
- Air Force Outstanding Unit Award with Combat "V" Device: 15 Jan 2004 – 31 Oct 2005 (Order # GA-25)
- Air Force Outstanding Unit Award with Combat "V" Device: 1 Jan 1972 – 31 Dec 1972 (Order # GA-621)
- Air Force Outstanding Unit Award with Combat "V" Device: 1 Jan 1971 – 31 Dec 1971 (Order # GA-495)
- Air Force Outstanding Unit Award with Combat "V" Device: 1 Jan 1969 – 31 Dec 1969 (Order # GA-408)

- Air Force Outstanding Unit Award: 1 Jan 2011 – 31 Dec 2011 (Order # GA-49)
- Air Force Outstanding Unit Award: 16 Jul 2009 – 31 Dec 2010 (Order # GA-98)
- Air Force Outstanding Unit Award: 1 Jan 2006 – 31 Dec 2007 (Order # GA-51)
- Air Force Outstanding Unit Award: 1 Jan 2006 – 31 Dec 2006
- Air Force Outstanding Unit Award: 1 Jun 2002 – 31 Dec 2003
- Air Force Outstanding Unit Award: 30 Jun 2000 – 31 May 2002
- Air Force Outstanding Unit Award: 1 Oct 1998 – 30 Jun 2000
- Air Force Outstanding Unit Award: 1 Oct 1996 – 30 Sep 1998 (Order # GA-15)
- Air Force Outstanding Unit Award: 1 Apr 1995 – 1 Jun 1996 (Order # GA-17)
- Air Force Outstanding Unit Award: 1 Jun 1993 – 30 Jun 1994
- Air Force Outstanding Unit Award: 1 Apr 1993 – 31 Mar 1995 (Order # GA-14)
- Air Force Outstanding Unit Award: 1 Jul 1991 – 30 Mar 1993 (Order # GA-9)
- Air Force Outstanding Unit Award: 1 Oct 1989 – 30 Jun 1991 (Order # GA-058)
- Air Force Outstanding Unit Award: 1 Jul 1989 – 30 Sep 1991 (Order # GA-058)
- Air Force Outstanding Unit Award: 1 Jul 1987 – 30 Jun 1989 (Order # GA-011)
- Air Force Outstanding Unit Award: 1 Jan 1986 – 31 Dec 1986 (Order # GB-549)
- Air Force Outstanding Unit Award: 1 Jan 1985 – 31 Dec 1985 (Order # GA-730)
- Air Force Outstanding Unit Award: 1 Jan 1983 – 31 Dec 1984 (Order # GB-503)
- Air Force Outstanding Unit Award: 1 Jan 1982 – 31 Dec 1982 (Order # GB-696)
- Air Force Outstanding Unit Award: 1 Jan 1981 – 31 Dec 1981 (Order # GB-598)
- Air Force Outstanding Unit Award: 1 Jan 1979 – 31 Dec 1980 (Order # GB-450)
- Air Force Outstanding Unit Award: 1 Jan 1978 – 31 Dec 1978 (Order # GB-635)
- Air Force Outstanding Unit Award: 1 Jan 1977 – 31 Dec 1977 (Order # GB-634)
- Air Force Outstanding Unit Award: 1 Jan 1975 – 31 Dec 1976 (Order # GB-785)
- Air Force Outstanding Unit Award: 1 Jan 1968 – 31 Dec 1968
- Air Force Outstanding Unit Award: 1 Jan 1966 – 31 Dec 1966 (Order # GB-239)
- Air Force Outstanding Unit Award: 1 Jan 1965 – 31 Dec 1965 (Order # GB-171)
- Air Force Outstanding Unit Award: 24 Jul 1963 – 31 Dec 1964
- Air Force Outstanding Unit Award: 1 Jan 1955 – 30 Nov 1956 (Order # GO-40)

- Air Force Meritorious Unit Award: 1 Jan 2018 – 31 Dec 2019 (Order # GA-007)
- Air Force Meritorious Unit Award: 1 Jul 2002 – 30 Jun 2004

- Navy Meritorious Unit Commendation: 1 Jan 1969 – 26 Jul 1969

- Philippine Republic Presidential Unit Citation: 21 Jul 1972 – 15 Aug 1972

- Republic of Vietnam Gallantry Cross with Palm Device: 1 Apr 1966 – 28 Jan 1973

== Equipment Operated ==
- Tactical Communications and Navigation Equipment
