= 435th Air Ground Operations Wing =

435th Air Ground Operations Wing

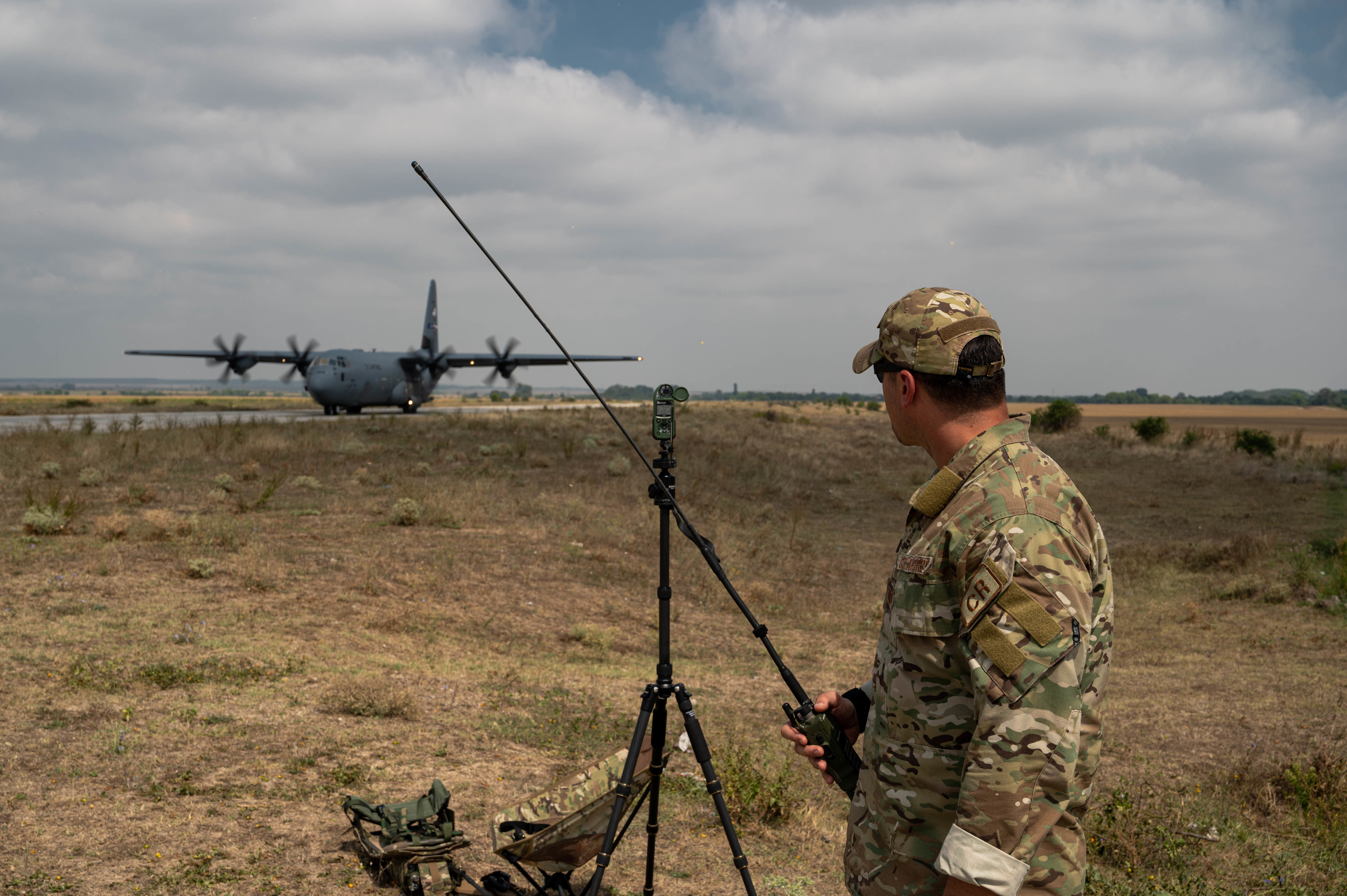
- An air traffic controller assigned to the wing's 435th Contingency Response Squadron observes a C-130 Hercules landing on a highway strip during an exercise in Bulgaria in 2021
- Active: 1949–1952; 1952–1965; 1968–1995; 2004–present
- Country: United States
- Branch: United States Air Force
- Role: Combat support, command and control and communications for deployed forces
- Part of: United States Air Forces in Europe – Air Forces Africa: Third Air Force
- Garrison/HQ: Ramstein Air Base, Germany
- Nickname: Flamingo Wing (1949–1965)
- Mottos: Citus et Certus (Latin for 'Swift and Sure')
- Decorations: Air Force Outstanding Unit Award

Commanders
- Current commander: Colonel Leland K. Cowie II
- Command Chief: CMSgt Jared S. Roman

Insignia
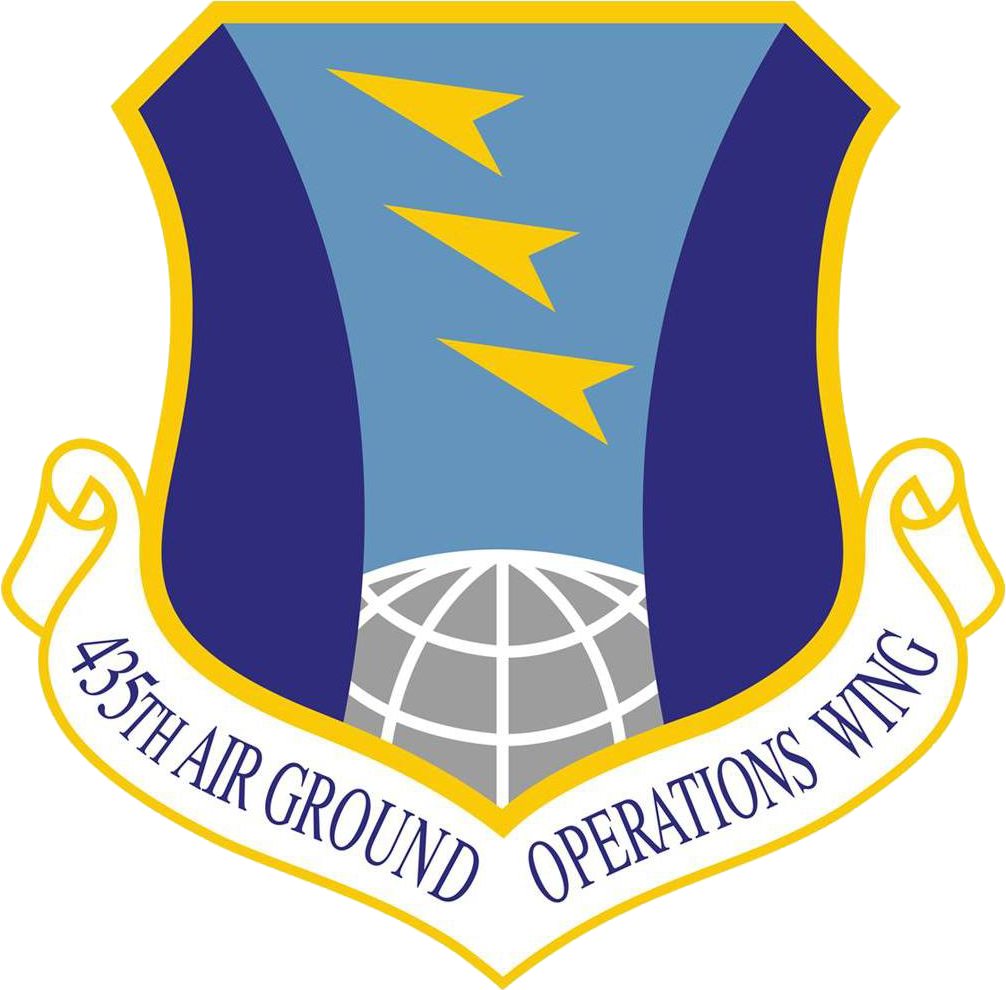
- 435th Air Ground Operations Wing emblem (Note: Approved 4 May 2004.)

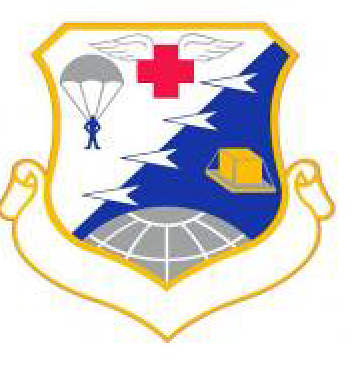
- 435th Tactical Airlift Wing emblem (Note: Approved 4 October 1976. Description: Per bend sinister argent and azure, four flight symbols fesswise of the first [color] garnished of the second [color] between in dexter flank a stylized figure of the last [color] supported by an open parachute celeste below in chief a cross couped gules winged fesswise of the field['s color] garnished silver, and issuing from base in para a demiglobe celeste gridlined argent below in sinister flank a crate on a platform all or, roped and garnished celeste, all within a diminished bordure gold.)

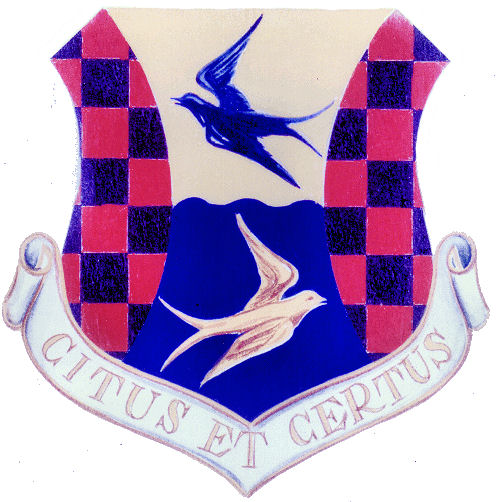
- 435th Troop Carrier Wing emblem (Note: Approved 22 May 1952. Description: Per fess wavy , or and azure, charged with two martlets, counter volant and counter-changed, between two flanches checky sable and gules.)

The 435th Air Ground Wing Operations (AGOW) is an active unit of the United States Air Force (USAF), assigned to Europe. It is stationed at Ramstein Air Base, Germany.

The current commander is Colonel Leland K. Cowie II, who assumed command on 18 June 2025. His command chief is Command Chief Master Sergeant Jared S. Roman.

The 435th AGOW is the second USAF wing solely dedicated to supporting battlefield airmen. It consolidated the Tactical Air Control Party and battlefield weather specialties of the 4th Air Support Operations Group (4 ASOG) The (4 ASOG) being the contingency communications support of the 436th Communications Operations Group (436 COG), and the expeditionary support to assess, prepare, and operate airfields for air expeditionary forces of the 436th Contingency Response Group (436 CRG).

== Mission ==
The 435 AGOW consists of three groups. Each group supports a specific portion of the wing's multifaceted mission.

- The 4th Air Support Operations Group (4 ASOG)
- The 435th Communications Operations Group (435 COG)
- The 435th Contingency Response Group (435 CRG)

The group is tasked with establishing an airfield and aerial port operations, and providing force protection at contingency airfields. The unit was activated as the 86th Contingency Response Group at Hangar 3 at Ramstein Air Base on 26 February 1999, and was the first unit of its kind in the Air Force. It incorporates more than 42 career fields/specialties, and is a rapid-deployment unit designed to be a "first-in" force to secure an airfield and establish and maintain airfield operations. It consists of three subordinate squadrons:
The CRG's Air Mobility Squadron provides airfield command and control, loads and unloads aircraft and essentially sets up an aerial port where none existed.
The CRG's Security Forces Squadron provides force protection in the opening stages of a deployment and also provides protection for any follow-up forces. The Security Forces Squadron is capable of overland airlift, air assault, or airborne insertion into crisis situations.
The CRG's Construction & Training Squadron provides Mission Essential Equipment Training (MEET) concentrates on specialized or unique mission-essential equipment that civil engineers do not use in their day-to-day operations. Mission Essential Equipment Training (MEET) provides hands-on training to students for proper certifications in their Career Field Education and Training Plan (CFETP) and in the Automated Civil Engineer System – Personnel Readiness (ACES-PR). MEET is reportable in the Status of Resources and Training System (SORTS) under Category II (CAT II) training. Individuals will be trained to the proficiency level prescribed in the approved MEET curriculum to set up, operate, troubleshoot, maintain and reconstitute equipment IAW Prime BEEF/Contingency Training Panel-approved objectives.
The CRG's newly formed Detachment 1 provides an OSS type function with a core capability resting in its Air Advisor Flight. This flight is predominately responsible for military-to-military engagements with partner nations, helping increase relationships in the European Command (EUCOM) and African Command (AFRICOM) Areas Of Responsibility (AORs).

== Component units ==
Unless otherwise indicated, units are based at Ramstein Air Base, Germany.

4th Air Support Operations Group

- 2nd Air Support Operations Squadron (2 ASOS) (Vilseck, Germany)
- 7th Combat Weather Squadron (7 CWS) (Wiesbaden, Germany)

435th Communications Operations Group

- 1st Air & Space Communications Operations Squadron (1 ACOS)
- 1st Combat Communications Squadron (1 CBCS)
- 1st Engineering Installation Squadron (1 EIS), formerly 1st Communications Maintenance Squadron (1 CMXS)

435th Contingency Response Group

- 435th Construction and Training Squadron (435 CTS)
- 435th Contingency Response Squadron (435 CRS)
- 435th Contingency Response Support Squadron (435 CRSS)
- 435th Security Forces Squadron (435 SFS)

== History ==
For additional history and lineage, see 435th Operations Group

=== Reserve operations ===
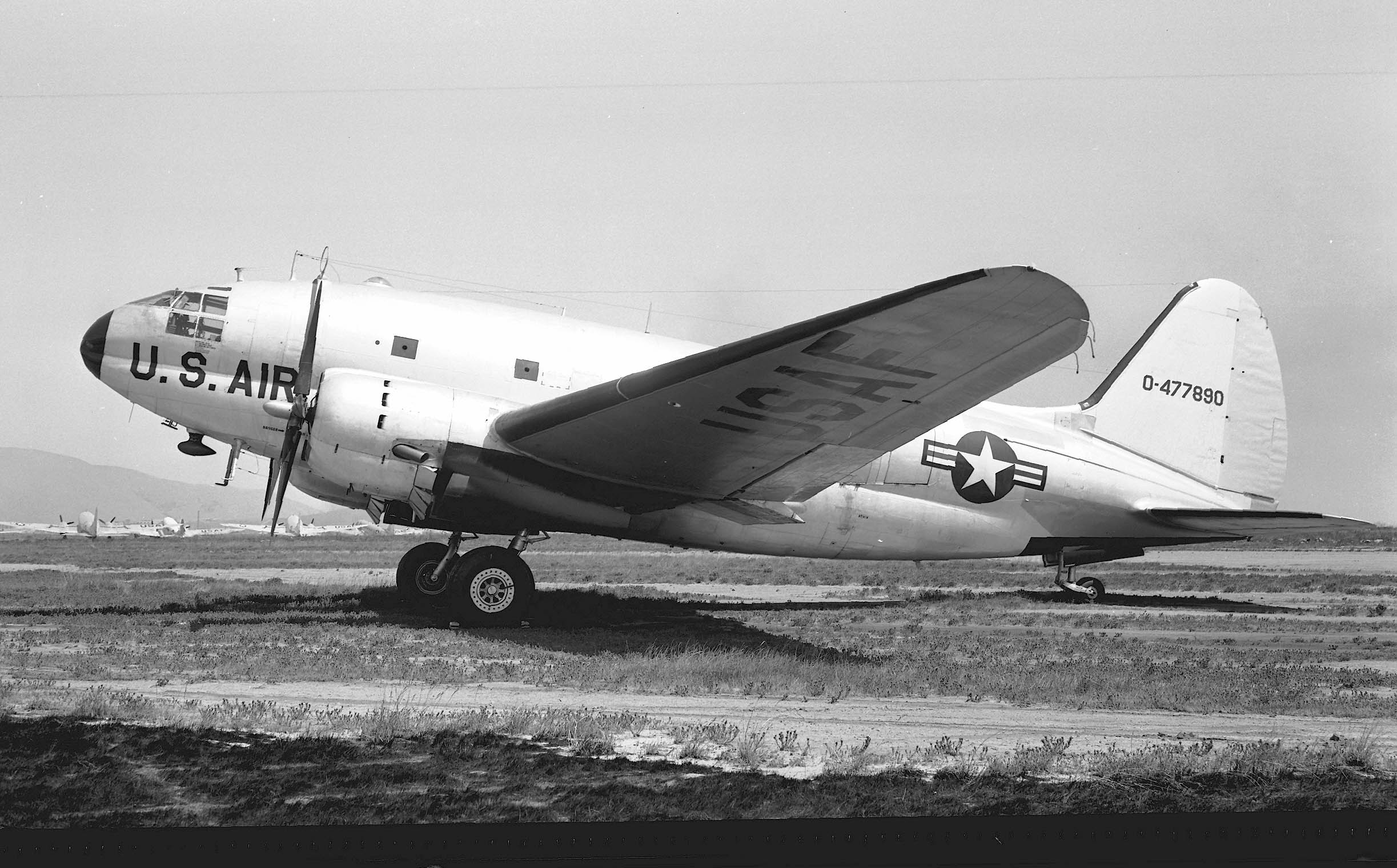
Curtiss C-46D

In June 1949, Continental Air Command (ConAC), which had the responsibility to train reserve units, reorganized its reserve units under the wing base organization system. As part of this reorganization and unit reductions required by president Truman's reduced 1949 defense budget, the 435th Troop Carrier Wing was activated at Miami International Airport, and formed its cadre from the inactivating 49th Air Division and 100th Bombardment Group.The wing was manned at 25% of normal strength but was authorized four squadrons rather than the three of active duty units.

==== Korean War mobilization ====
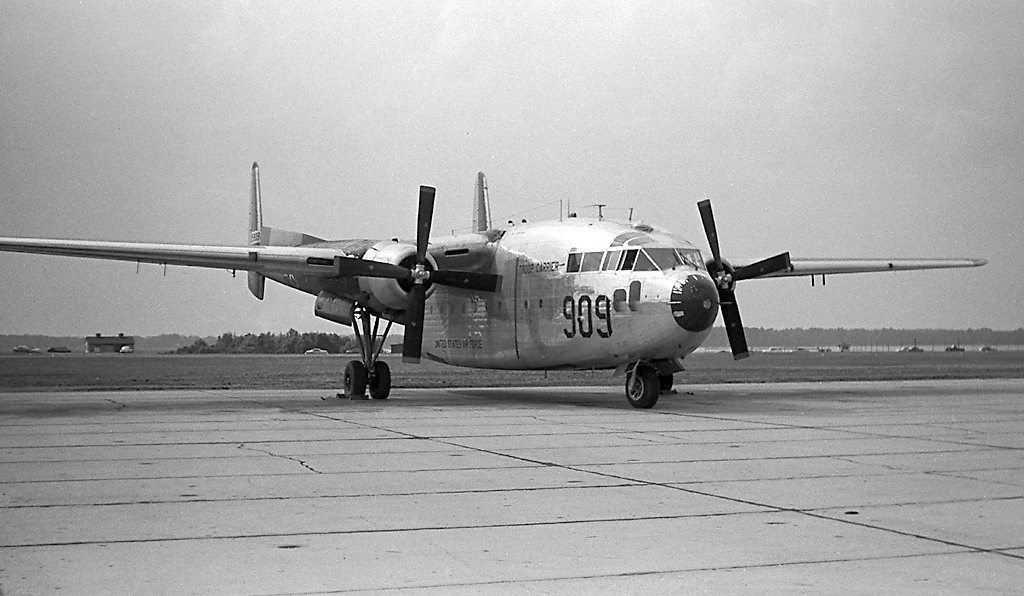
Fairchild C-119G Flying Boxcar

At Miami, the wing trained with C-46s under the supervision of the active duty 2585th Air Force Reserve Training Center. The wing was ordered into active service in March 1951 as a result of the Korean War. Along with other reserve units called to active duty, it formed the Tactical Air Command's Eighteenth Air Force. The 435th's initial function was to train C-46 aircrews for service in Korea. The wing also trained with Fairchild C-119 Flying Boxcars. Although it remained at Miami, the wing deployed twice while on active duty: to Laurinburg-Maxton Airport, North Carolina from 21 July until 1 September 1951 and to Grenier Air Force Base, New Hampshire from 2 January to 3 March 1952. It was relieved from active duty and inactivated on 1 December 1952 and its mission, personnel and equipment were transferred to the regular 456th Troop Carrier Wing, which was activated the same day.

==== Troop carrier operations ====
The wing was activated as a reserve unit the same day at the same station, but with the personnel and equipment of the inactive 482d Troop Carrier Wing. In the reserve, the 435th once again flew Curtiss Commandos under the supervision of the 2585th Center. In the summer of 1956, the wing participated in Operation Sixteen Ton during its two weeks of active duty training. Sixteen Ton was performed entirely by reserve troop carrier units and moved United States Coast Guard equipment from Floyd Bennett Naval Air Station to Isla Grande Airport in Puerto Rico and San Salvador in the Bahamas. After the success of this operation, the wing began to use inactive duty training periods for Operation Swift Lift, transporting high priority cargo for the Air Force; and Operation Ready Swap, transporting aircraft engines between Air Materiel Command's depots. In addition, for the first time as a reserve unit, its flying was performed in unit tactical aircraft, rather than in trainers.

==== Detached Squadron Concept ====
During the first half of 1955, the Air Force began detaching reserve squadrons to separate locations. The dispersal of separate squadrons to smaller population centres was intended to facilitate recruiting and manning. One of the first three squadrons to move as this policy was implemented was the 78th Troop Carrier Squadron, which was activated at Orlando Air Force Base in April 1955 after having been inactivated at Miami the previous year. In August 1956, the wing's 77th Troop Carrier Squadron left Miami for Pinellas County Airport, Florida. The squadron's stay in the Tampa Bay area was brief, however, for in November 1957 it moved again, this time to New Orleans Naval Air Station, Louisiana. Only the 76th Squadron remained with group headquarters in Miami. In 1957, the wing once again received C-119s.

In 1958, the 2585th Center was inactivated and some of its personnel were absorbed by the wing. In place of active duty support for reserve units, Continental Air Command adopted the Air Reserve Technician program, in which a cadre of the unit consisted of full-time personnel who were simultaneously civilian employees of the Air Force and also held military rank as members of the reserves.

==== Activation of groups under the wing ====
The 435th Troop Carrier Group was inactivated on 14 April 1959 when the 435th Wing adopted the Dual Deputy organization and the group's squadrons were assigned directly to the wing. In 1960, the wing left Miami International Airport and moved south to Homestead Air Force Base, Florida.

Although the dispersal of flying units under the Detached Squadron Concept was not a problem when the entire wing was called to active service, mobilizing a single flying squadron and elements to support it proved difficult. This weakness was demonstrated in the partial mobilization of reserve units during the Berlin Crisis of 1961. The 77th and 78th Troop Carrier Squadrons converted to the Douglas C-124 Globemaster II in 1961, and were ordered to active service for the crisis, although the 76th Troop Carrier Squadron, which continued to fly the C-119, remained in reserve status. After training to become combat ready, the mobilized wing participated in worldwide airlift and tactical exercises. The wing returned to reserve status in August 1962 and the 76th Squadron was once more assigned.

To resolve the mobilization problem, at the start of 1962 Continental Air Command determined to reorganize its reserve wings by establishing groups with support elements for each of its troop carrier squadrons. This reorganization would facilitate mobilization of elements of wings in various combinations when needed. However, as this plan was entering its implementation phase, another partial mobilization occurred for the Cuban Missile Crisis. The formation of troop carrier groups was delayed until January for wings that had not been mobilized. The 915th Troop Carrier Group at Homestead, the 916th Troop Carrier Group at Donaldson Air Force Base, South Carolina and the 917th Troop Carrier Group at Barksdale Air Force Base, Louisiana, were all assigned to the wing on 17 January. That spring, the Air Force closed Donaldson and the 916th Group moved to Carswell Air Force Base, Texas and was reassigned. It was replaced by the 908th Troop Carrier Group at Bates Field, Alabama. The wing's other Globemaster group, the 917th, was reassigned in July and the wing once again flew Flying Boxcars as its tactical aircraft.

The wing was inactivated in April 1965 and had its groups reassigned to other reserve wings.

=== European airlift ===
Reactivated first at RAF High Wycombe, England, 24 December 1968, then moved to Wiesbaden, West Germany on 1 July 1969, the 435th served as a support wing of Military Airlift Command, providing deployed airlift control elements and aircraft maintenance at aerial ports in portions of Europe, the Middle East, Southwest Asia, and Africa.

The re-designated 435th Tactical Airlift Wing had host responsibilities for Rhein-Main AB, beginning July 1975, which included operating the busiest U.S. air terminal in Europe and supporting CONUS-based strategic airlift transiting Rhein-Main. While continuing to function as a tactical and support wing, the 435th TAW gained the mission of aeromedical evacuation in Europe and the Middle East. Provided airlift support for United States European Command (EUCOM) and Headquarters, United States Air Forces in Europe (USAFE), from March 1977 until June 1978.

Provided airlift for the theater, first with rotational Lockheed C-130 Hercules forces until early 1978, and afterward with a permanently assigned C-130 airlift squadron. Participated in joint and combined paratroop training and exercises, as well all manner of theater humanitarian airlift, including relief for natural disasters, evacuation of civilians from hostile situations, and aeromedical evacuation from combat areas.

During Operation Desert Shield/Storm, the wing's 37th Tactical Airlift Squadron, plus additional wing personnel, deployed to Al Ain, United Arab Emirates, from mid-August 1990 to late March 1991 to provide theater airlift during the Persian Gulf War.

On 1 April 1992, the wing was again re-designated as the 435th Airlift Wing and implemented USAF's objective wing concept. With the inactivation of Military Airlift Command in 1992, the wing and Rhein-Main returned to USAFE control, while an Air Mobility Command airlift support group was activated to take over operation of the air terminal and support transiting air mobility (i.e., strategic airlift, theater airlift, and air refueling) aircraft.

From July 1992 through September 1994, the wing controlled the massive airlift effort (Operation Provide Promise) to provide airland and airdrop humanitarian airlift to war-torn areas of the former Yugoslavia.

On 1 October 1993 the 55 AAS and 58 AS were inactivated as part of the general drawdown of USAF units and installations in Europe at the end of the Cold War. In February 1994, USAF began returning portions of Rhein-Main Air Base to German control and the wing's remaining airlift squadron was reassigned to the 86th Wing (86 WG) at Ramstein Air Base. The 86th Wing was redesignated the 86th Airlift Wing on 1 October 1994. The 435 AW was inactivated effective 1 April 1995 and its responsibilities at Rhein-Main turned over to the 469th Air Base Group under USAFE and the 626th Air Mobility Support Squadron under Air Mobility Command. The last commander of the 435th Airlift Wing was Col Donald A.Philpitt, USAF.

=== Expeditionary status ===
The 435 AW was converted to a provisional expeditionary wing, the 435th Air Expeditionary Wing, in February 2001, but was never activated as an expeditionary unit. It was returned to regular status in December 2003.

=== Activation at Ramstein ===
In January 2004, the wing was reactivated as the 435th Air Base Wing and assumed the overall host base support responsibilities at Ramstein Air Base, Germany as a non-flying unit.

In mid 2009, the 435th Air Base Wing was re-designated the 435th Air Ground Operations Wing, the second wing of its kind in the USAF. The 435th assumed mission areas previously performed by two 86th Airlift Wing units – the contingency response group and the air and space communications group – along with the 4th Air Support Operations Group at Heidelberg, Germany. The 431st Air Base Group was inactivated during an earlier ceremony. The remaining mission areas of the 435th (e.g., base support of Ramstein) were merged back into the 86th Airlift Wing.

== Lineage ==
- Established as 435th Troop Carrier Wing, Medium on 10 May 1949

Activated in the reserve on 26 June 1949
Ordered to active service on 1 March 1951
Inactivated on 1 December 1952

- Activated in the reserve on 1 December 1952

Re-designated 435th Troop Carrier Wing, Heavy on 18 September 1961
Ordered to active service on 1 October 1961
Relieved from active service on 27 August 1962
Re-designated 435th Troop Carrier Wing, Medium on 1 July 1963
Discontinued and inactivated, on 1 December 1965

- Re-designated as 435th Military Airlift Support Wing on 25 November 1968

Activated on 24 December 1968
Re-designated 435th Tactical Airlift Wing on 1 July 1975
Re-designated 435th Airlift Wing on 1 April 1992
Inactivated on 1 April 1995

- Re-designated 435th Air Expeditionary Wing and converted to provisional status on 5 February 2001
- Returned to permanent status on 10 December 2003

Re-designated 435th Air Base Wing on 15 December 2003
Activated on 15 January 2004
Re-designated 435th Air Ground Operations Wing on 16 July 2009

=== Assignments ===
- Fourteenth Air Force, 26 July 1949
- Tactical Air Command, 2 March 1951
- Eighteenth Air Force, 1 June 1951 – 1 December 1952
- Fourteenth Air Force, 1 December 1952
- Third Air Force Reserve Region, 15 July 1960
- Ninth Air Force, 1 October 1961
- Third Air Force Reserve Region, 27 August 1962 – 1 December 1965
- Twenty-First Air Force, 24 December 1968
- 322d Airlift Division, 23 June 1978
- United States Air Forces in Europe, 1 April 1992
- Seventeenth Air Force, 1 February 1993 – 1 April 1995
- United States Air Forces in Europe to activate or inactivate any time after 5 February 2001.
- Third Air Force, 15 January 2004
- United States Air Forces in Europe, 1 November 2005
- Air Command Europe, 18 November 2005
- Third Air Force (Air Forces Europe), 1 December 2006 – present

=== Components ===
Groups

- 4th Air Support Operations Group
- 435th Troop Carrier Group (later 435th Tactical Airlift Group, 435th Operations Group): 26 June 1949 – 1 December 1952; 1 December 1952 – 14 April 1959; 1 July 1975 – 23 June 1978; 15 September 1978 – 1 June 1980; 1 April 1992 – 1 April 1995
- 435th Contingency Response Group Lineage
- 435th Air and Space Communications Group
- 908th Troop Carrier Group: 18 March 1963 – 1 December 1965
- 915th Troop Carrier Group: 17 January 1963 – 1 December 1965
- 916th Troop Carrier Group: 17 January – 18 March 1963
- 917th Troop Carrier Group: 17 January – 1 July 1963

Squadrons

- 37th Tactical Airlift Squadron (later 37th Airlift Squadron): 1 October 1977 – 15 December 1978; 1 June 1980 – 1 April 1992
- 2nd Aeromedical Evacuation Squadron: 31 March 1975 – 15 December 1978; 1 June 1980 – 1 April 1992
- 58th Military Airlift Squadron: 1 September 1977 – 23 June 1978
- 76th Troop Carrier Squadron: 14 April 1959 – 1 October 1961; 27 August 1962 – 17 January 1963
- 77th Troop Carrier Squadron: 14 April 1959 – 17 January 1963
- 78th Troop Carrier Squadron: 8 May 1959 – 17 January 1963

=== Stations ===
- Miami International Airport, Florida, 26 June 1949 – 1 December 1952; 1 December 1952
- Homestead Air Force Base, Florida, 25 July 1960 – 1 December 1965
- RAF High Wycombe, England, 24 December 1968
- Rhein-Main Air Base, Germany, 1 July 1969 – 1 April 1995
- Ramstein Air Base, Germany, 15 January 2004 – present

=== Aircraft ===
- Curtiss C-46 Commando, 1949–1951; 1952–1957
- Fairchild C-119 Flying Boxcar, 1951–1952; 1957–1965
- Douglas C-124 Globemaster II, 1961–1963
- Lockheed C-130 Hercules, 1975–1994
- Douglas C-9A Nightingale, 1975–1993
- Boeing VC-135, 1977–1978
- Lockheed VC-140, 1977–1978
- Beechcraft C-12 Huron, 1978
- North American CT-39 Sabreliner, 1978
- Lockheed C-141 Starlifter, 1994
