= 2nd Air Support Operations Squadron =

2nd Air Support Operations Squadron

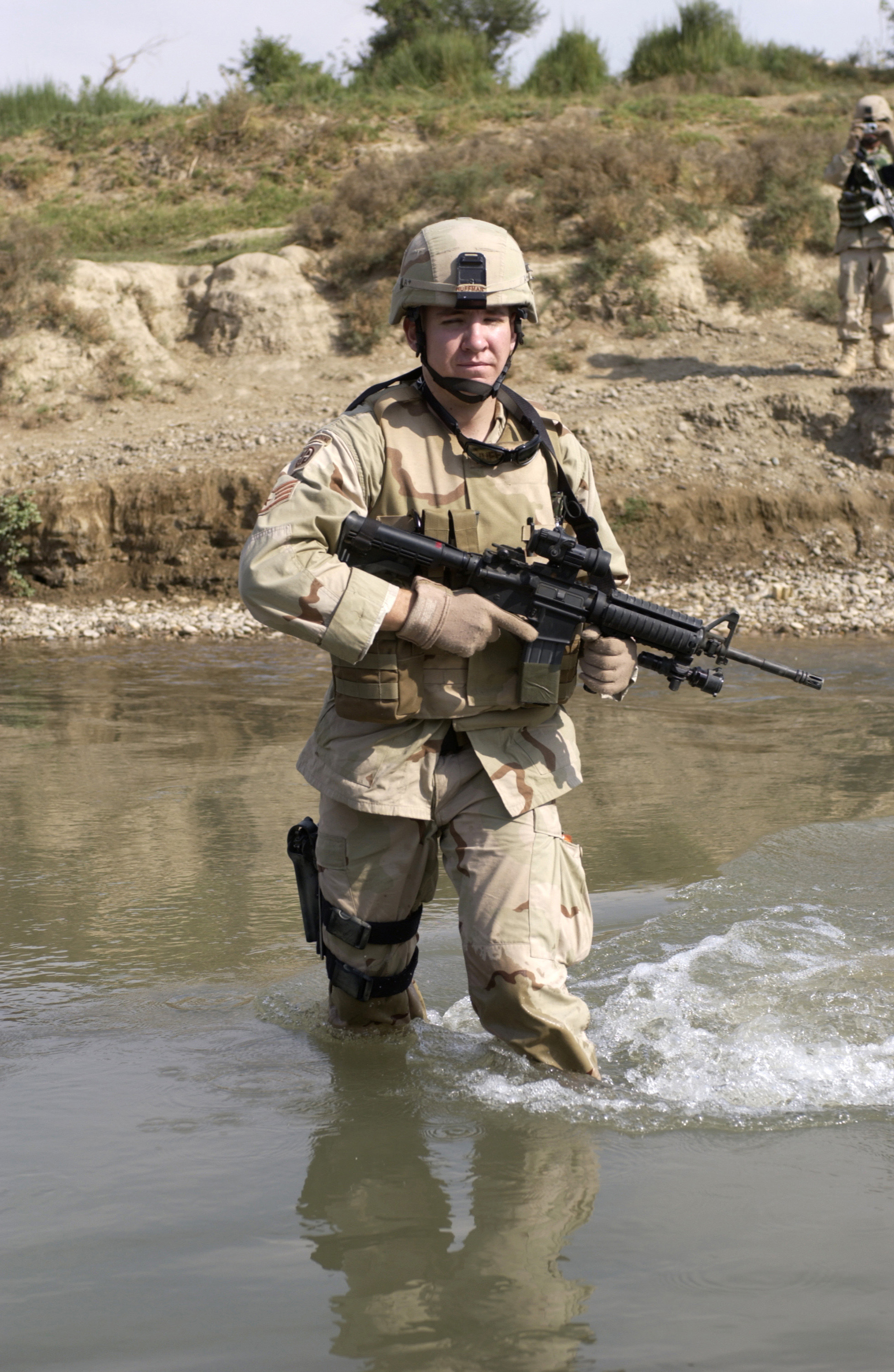
- An airman from the 2nd ASOS crossing the Tigris in 2004
- Active: 1942–1945; 1996–present
- Country: United States
- Branch: United States Air Force
- Type: Combat Support
- Role: Air Support Operations
- Part of: United States Air Forces in Europe – Air Forces Africa: Third Air Force; 435th Air Ground Operations Wing; 4th Air Support Operations Group
- Garrison/HQ: Vilseck, Germany
- Motto(s): Strike with Fury
- Engagements: Mediterranean Theater of Operations; Iraq War
- Decorations: Air Force Outstanding Unit Award with Combat "V" Device; Air Force Outstanding Unit Award

Insignia
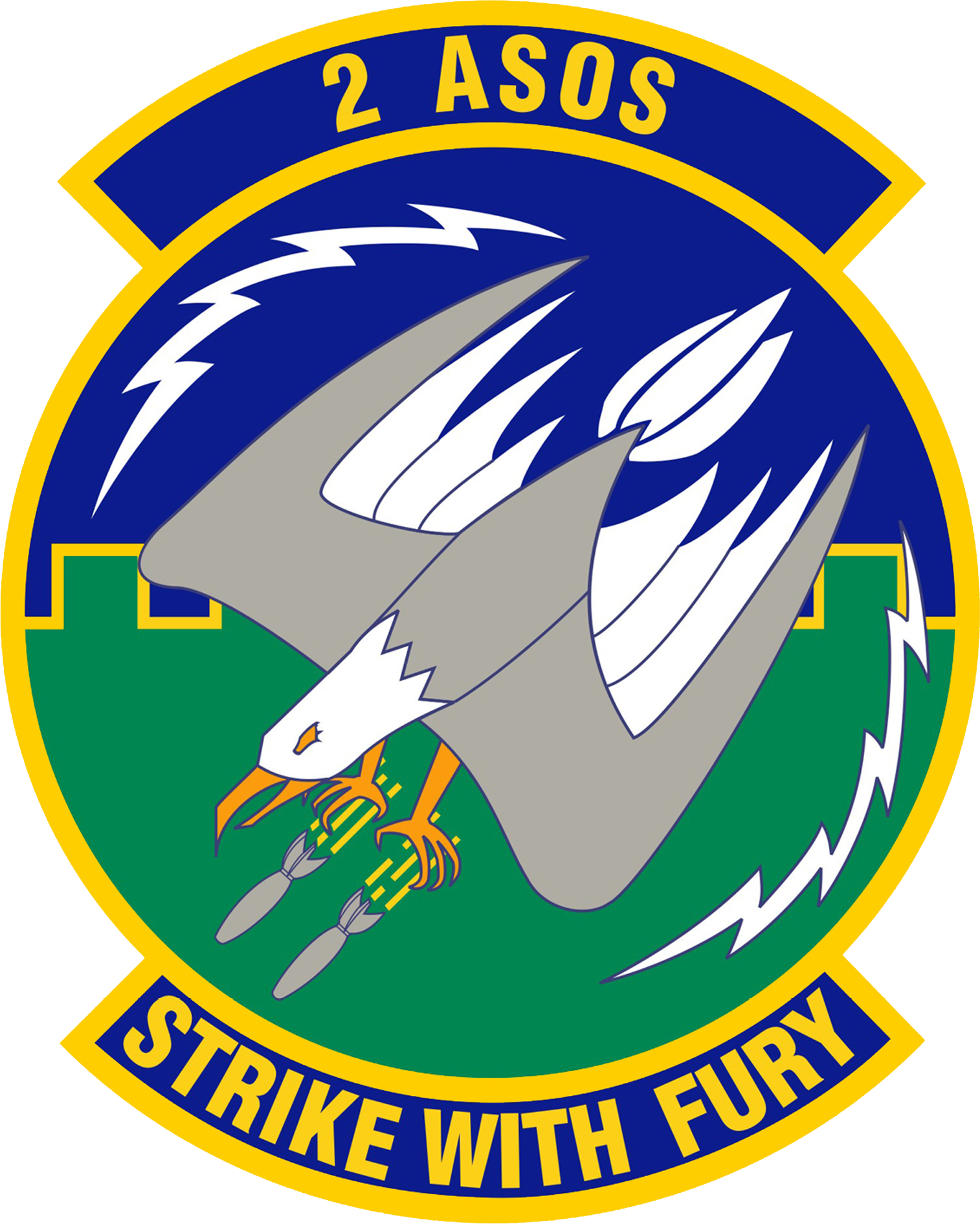
- 2nd Air Support Operations Squadron emblem (approved 26 April 2000)

The United States Air Force's 2nd Air Support Operations Squadron (2 ASOS) is a combat support unit located in Vilseck, Germany. The squadron provides tactical command and control of airpower assets to the Joint Forces Air Component Commander and Joint Forces Land Component Commander for combat operations.

== Mission ==
The 2nd Air Support Operations Squadron trains, equips, and maintains mission-ready air liaison, terminal attack control, and weather observation and forecasting elements to support the commanders of US Army units, such as the 2nd Cavalry Regiment.

== Lineage ==
- Constituted as the 2nd Communications Squadron, Air Support on 8 April 1942

Activated on 20 April 1942
Redesignated 2nd Air Support Communication Squadron on 11 January 1943
Redesignated 2nd Tactical Air Communications Squadron on 1 April 1944
Inactivated on 7 December 1945
Disbanded on 8 October 1948

- Reconstituted and redesignated 2nd Air Support Operations Squadron on 1 September 1996

Activated on 30 September 1996

=== Assignments ===
- 47th Bombardment Group, 20 April 1942
- II Ground Air Support Command, 1 May 1942
- III Ground Air Support Command (later III Air Support Command), 31 May 1942
- Twelfth Air Force, 26 December 1942; XII Air Support Command (later XII Tactical Air Command), 2 February 1943
- 64th Fighter Wing, 6 July–c. November 1945
- 4th Air Support Operations Group, 30 September 1996 – present

=== Stations ===
- Will Rogers Field, Oklahoma, 20 April 1942
- Camp Young, California, 18 May 1942
- Mansfield, Louisiana, 21 July 1942
- Will Rogers Field, Oklahoma, 23 September 1942
- Camp Kilmer, New Jersey, 22 November 1942–11 December 1942
- Mers El Kebir, Algeria, 26 December 1942
- Sainte-Barbe du Tlelat Airfield, Algeria, 26 December 1942
- Oran, Algeria, 2 January 1943
- Oujda, French Morocco, 15 January 1943
- Algiers, Algeria, 12 June 1943
- Korba, Tunisia, 1 July 1943
- Tunis, Tunisia, 18 July 1943
- Gela Airfield, Sicily, Italy, July 1943
- Palermo, Sicily, Italy 31 July 194
- Milazzo Airfield, Sicily, Italy, 31 August 1943
- St Antoine, Italy, 11 September 1943
- Paestum Airfield, Italy, 14 September 1943
- Pontecagnano Airport, Italy, 30 September 1943
- Naples, Italy, 7 October 1943
- Caserta, Italy, 24 October 1943
- Presenzano, Italy, 28 January 1944
- Sparanise, Italy, 27 March 1944
- Sermoneta, Italy, 3 June 1944
- Rome, Italy, 9 June 1944
- Tuscania, Italy, 17 June 1944
- Roccastrada, Italy, 2 July 1944
- Naples, Italy, 16 July 1944
- Saint-Tropez, France, 14 August 1944
- Brignoles, France, 20 August 1944
- Grenoble, France, 30 August 1944
- Lons-le-Saunier, France, 7 September 1944
- Vesoul, France, 19 September 1944
- Épinal, France, 4 October 1944
- Sarrebourg, France, 29 November 1944
- Saverne, France, 8 December 1944
- Lunéville, France, 1 January 1945
- Sarreguemines, France, 20 March 1945
- Kaiserslautern, Germany, 25 March 1945
- Darmstadt, Germany, 1 April 1945
- Kitzingen, Germany, 15 April 1945
- Schwäbisch Gmünd, Germany, 26 April 1945
- Augsburg, Germany, 2 May 1945
- Darmstadt, Germany, 30 May 1945
- Stuttgart, Germany, 4 October 1945
- Darmstadt, Germany, 10 October 1945
- Mannheim, Germany, 18 October 1945
- Marseille, France, November–26 November 1945
- Camp Patrick Henry, Virginia, 7 December 1945
- Würzburg, Germany, 30 September 1996
- Vilseck, Germany, 12 Jan 2007 – present

=== Decorations ===
- Air Force Outstanding Unit Award
