= 4th Air Support Operations Group =

U.S. Air Force air support operations group in Germany

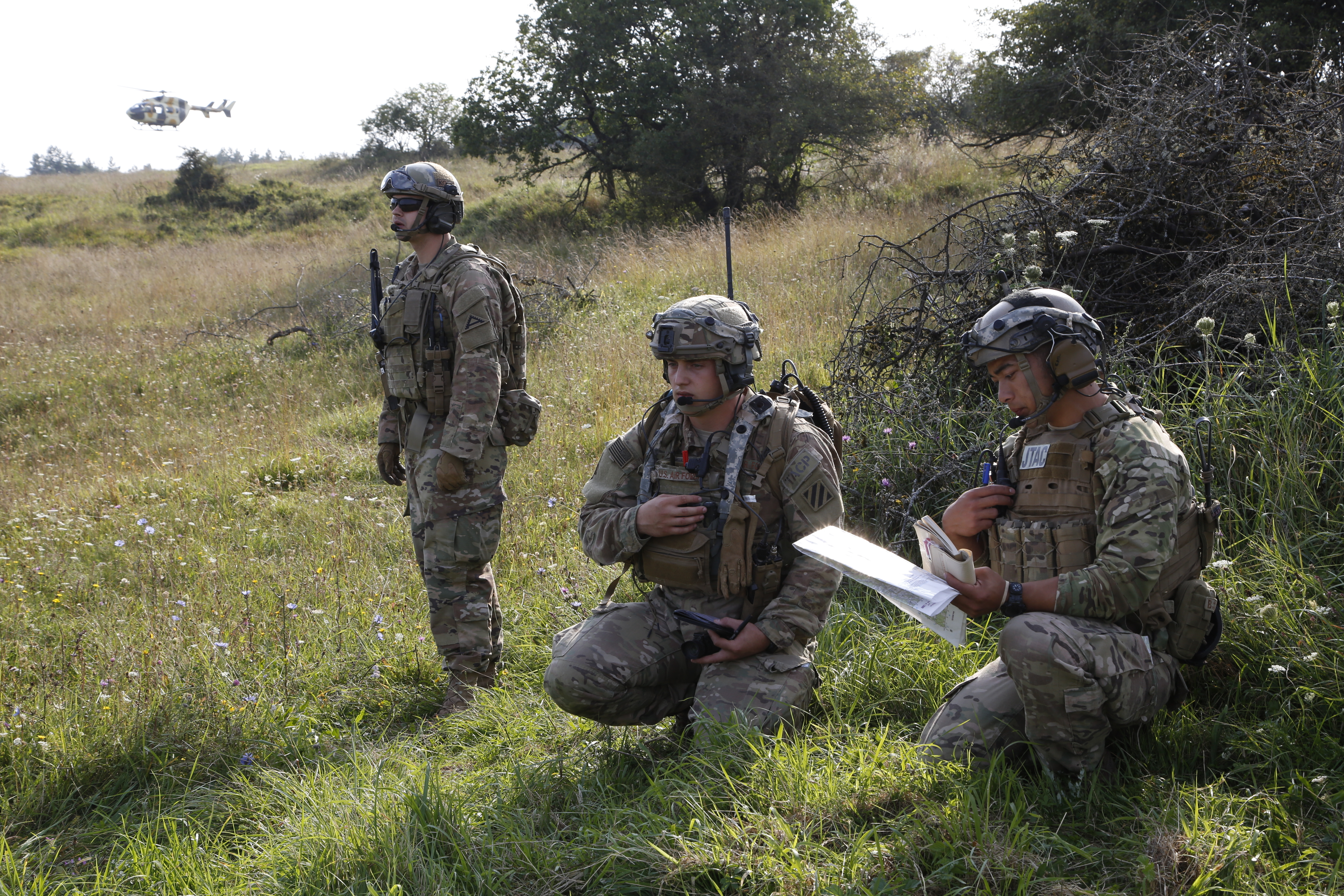
- Members of the group's 2nd Air Support Operations Squadron call in a fire mission during exercise Combined Resolve VII at the Joint Multinational Readiness Center, Germany in 2016
- Active: 1942–1947; 1984–1994; 1996–present
- Country: United States
- Branch: United States Air Force
- Type: Group
- Role: Air support operations; air–ground integration; tactical command and control
- Part of: United States Air Forces in Europe – Air Forces Africa: Third Air Force; 435th Air Ground Operations Wing
- Garrison/HQ: Wiesbaden, Germany
- Engagements: World War II – American Theater World War II – EAME Theater: Normandy campaign; Northern France campaign; Rhineland campaign; Ardennes–Alsace campaign; Central Europe campaign; Iraq War: Iraqi National Resolution

- Decorations: Air Force Outstanding Unit Award with Combat "V" Device

Insignia
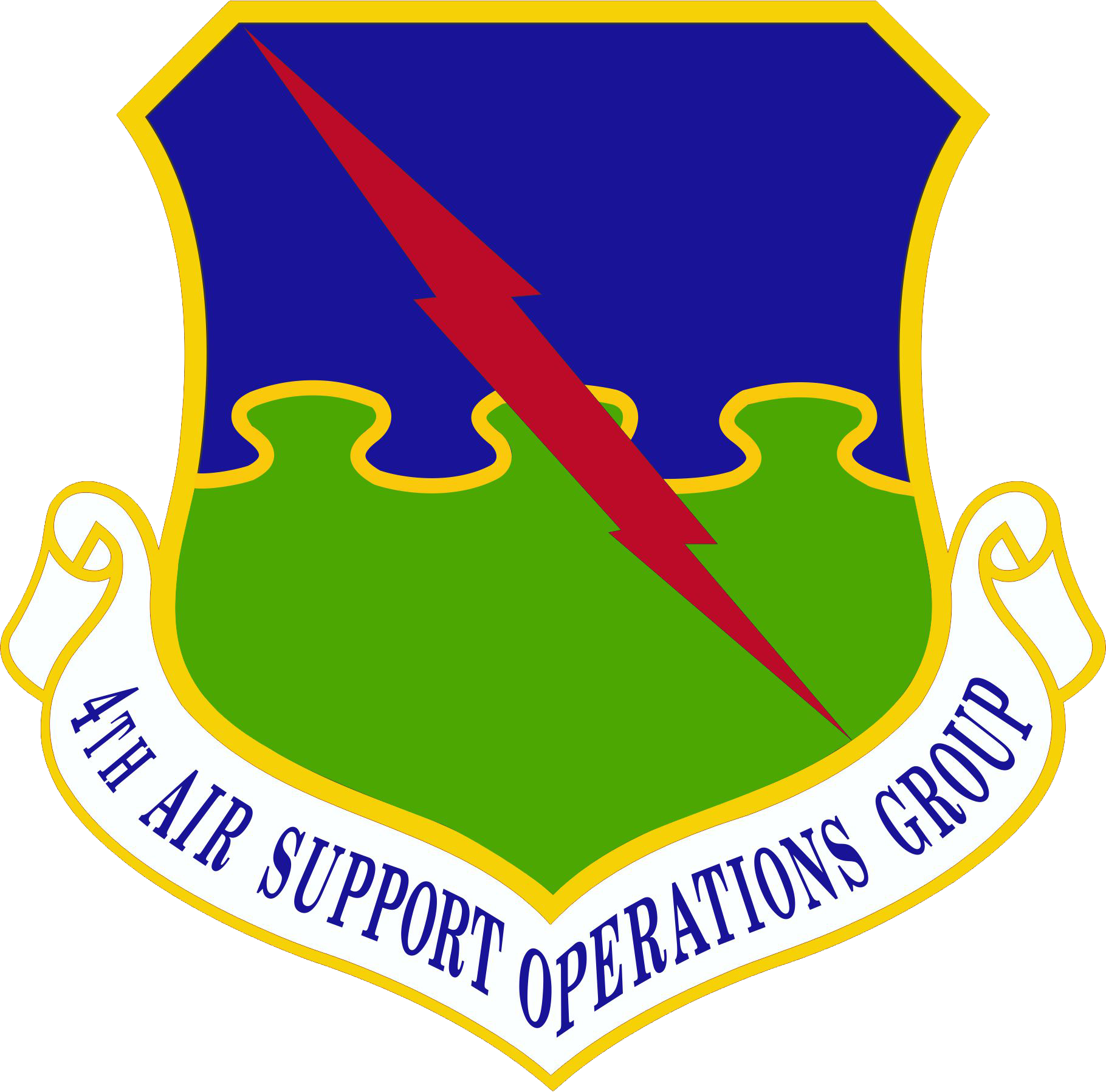
- 4th Air Support Operations Group emblem (Note: Approved 6 May 1985.)

The 4th Air Support Operations Group (4 ASOG) is a United States Air Force unit assigned to the 435th Air Ground Operations Wing and United States Air Forces in Europe – Air Forces Africa. It is stationed at Wiesbaden, Germany. The group provides air–ground integration and tactical command and control in support of U.S. Army and joint forces in the European theater, including Tactical Air Control Party (TACP) capabilities and related coordination functions. The group traces its lineage to World War II tactical air communications and air support control organizations and has served in multiple activations supporting U.S. air and ground operations in Europe.

== Mission ==
The group provides air–ground integration for U.S. Army and joint operations, including tactical coordination functions associated with air support operations in the European theater.

== Organization ==
The group’s subordinate units include:

- 2d Air Support Operations Squadron (2 ASOS), Vilseck, Germany
- 7th Combat Weather Squadron (7 CWS), Wiesbaden, Germany

== History ==
According to the Air Force Historical Research Agency, the unit’s lineage includes World War II activations that evolved through redesignations associated with air support communications and air support control functions, followed by later activations in Europe supporting air support operations. The modern group has been active since 1996 and has remained assigned within USAFE structures, moving under the 435th Air Ground Operations Wing in 2009.

== Lineage ==
4th Tactical Air Communications Squadron

- Constituted as the 4th Communications Squadron, Air Support on 15 May 1942

Activated on 5 June 1942
Redesignated 4th Air Support Communication Squadron on 11 January 1943
Redesignated 4th Air Support Control Squadron on 20 August 1943
Redesignated 4th Tactical Air Communications Squadron on 1 April 1944
Inactivated on 5 June 1947
Disbanded on 8 October 1948
Reconstituted and consolidated with the 601st Air Support Operations Group on 8 February 1988

4th Air Support Operations Group

- Established as the 601st Air Support Operations Center Group on 8 March 1984

Activated on 15 March 1984
Redesignated 601st Air Support Operations Group on 1 May 1985
Consolidated with the 4th Tactical Air Communications Squadron on 8 February 1988
Redesignated 4th Air Support Operations Group on 1 March 1988
Inactivated on 1 July 1994
Activated on 1 August 1996

=== Assignments ===
- IV Ground Air (later, IV Air) Support Command, 5 June 1942
- Desert Training Center, 21 January 1943
- Fourth Air Force, 7 September 1943
- Ninth Air Force, 16 November 1943
- IX Fighter Command, 19 November 1943
- IX Air Support Command, 12 December 1943
- XIX Air Support (later, XIX Tactical Air) Command, 4 March 1944
- XII Tactical Air Command, 4 July 1945 – 5 June 1947
- 601st Tactical Control Wing, 15 March 1984
- 65th Air Division, 1 June 1985 (attached to Seventeenth Air Force for operational control, 31 October 1985 – 14 March 1986)
- Seventeenth Air Force, 15 March 1986 – 1 July 1994
- Third Air Force, 1 August 1996
- Sixteenth Air Force, 1 November 2005
- Third Air Force, 1 December 2006
- 435th Air Ground Operations Wing, 16 July 2009 – present

=== Stations ===
- Hamilton Field, California, 5 June 1942
- Camp Young, California, 4 November 1942
- Thermal AAB, California, 12 February 1943
- Camp Kilmer, New Jersey, 29 October 1943 – 5 November 1943
- Scotland, 16 November 1943
- Aldermaston Court, England, 3 December 1943
- Criqueville, France, 10 July 1944
- Nehou, France, c. 13 July 1944
- St Germain, France, 17 August 1944
- Autainville, France, 31 August 1944
- Chalons-sur-Marne, France, c. 14 September 1944
- Étain, France, 23 September 1944
- Nancy, France, 5 October 1944
- Rollingergrund, Luxembourg, 7 January 1945
- Idar Oberstein, Germany, 27 March 1945
- Frankfurt-on-Main, Germany, 3 April 1945
- Hersfeld, Germany, 11 April 1945
- Erlangen, Germany, 23 April 1945
- Bad Kissingen, Germany, 1 November 1945
- Bad Neustadt, Germany, 29 August 1946 – 5 June 1947
- Frankfurt, Germany, 15 March 1984 – 1 July 1994
- Heidelberg, Germany, 1 August 1996
- Wiesbaden, Germany, 31 March 2013 – present
