= Jay D. Jensen =

U.S. Air Force general

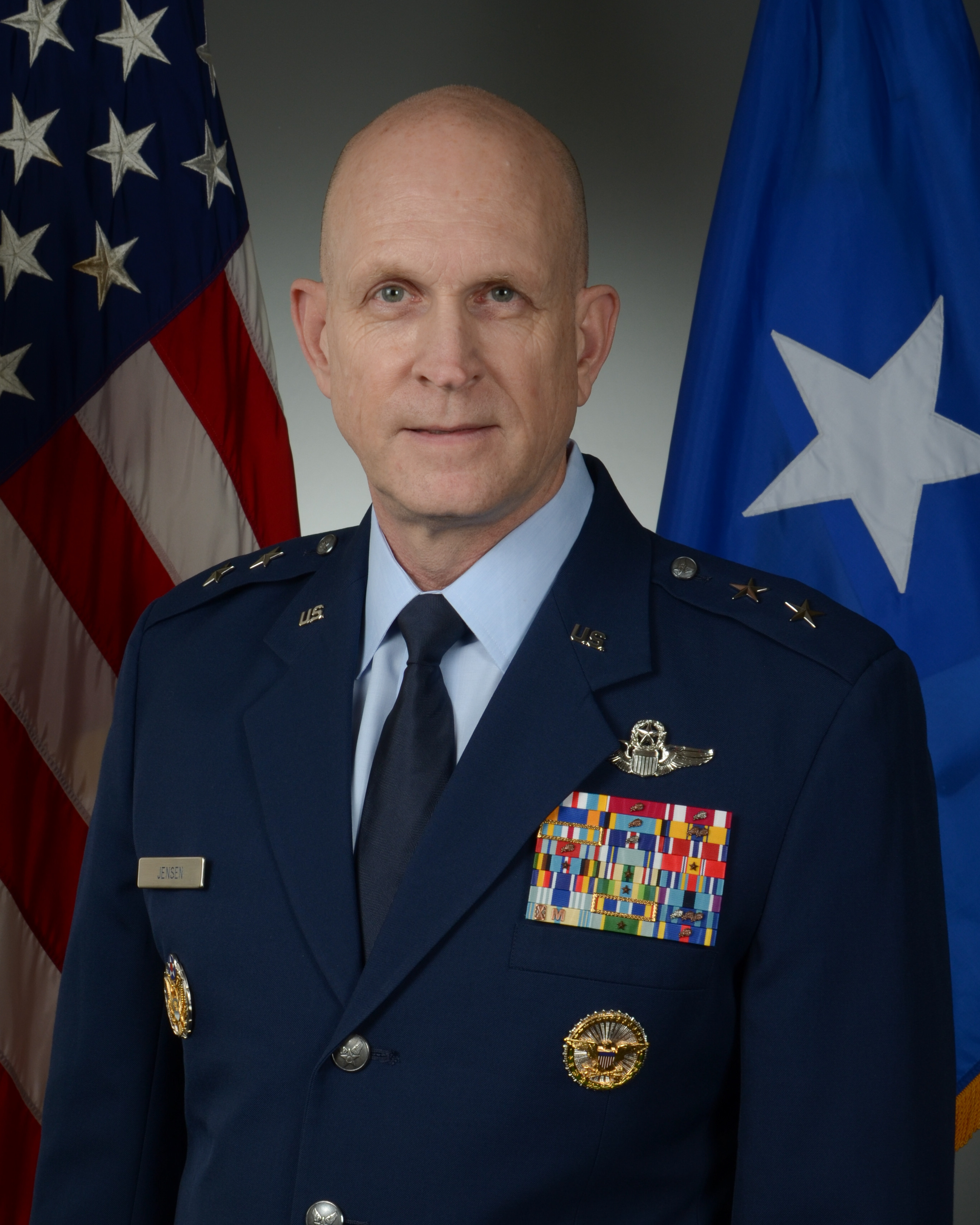
- Official portrait, 2019
- Military career
- Allegiance: United States
- Branch: United States Air Force
- Service years: 1987–2022
- Rank: Major General
- Commands: 439th Airlift Wing; 403rd Wing; 403rd Operations Group
- Awards: Defense Superior Service Medal; Legion of Merit

Jay D. Jensen is a retired United States Air Force major general who last served as Special Assistant to the Commander, Air Force Reserve Command from March 2022 to June 2022. He most recently served as the Director of Strategic Plans, Programs and Requirements of the Air Force Reserve Command and prior to that served as the Mobilization Assistant to the Director of Air Force Reserve Plans, Programs, and Requirements of the United States Air Force.

Military offices
Preceded by Albert V. Lupenski	Commander of the 439th Airlift Wing; 2016–2017	Succeeded by D. Scott Durham
Preceded by Derek P. Rydholm	Director of Air Force Reserve Plans, Programs, and Requirements of the United States Air Force; 2017–2018	Succeeded by Albert V. Lupenski
Preceded by Albert V. Lupenski	Director of Plans, Programs and Requirements of the Air Force Reserve Command; 2018–2022	Succeeded by Richard L. Kemble
