= Oscar Westover =

American military officer

Oscar M. Westover
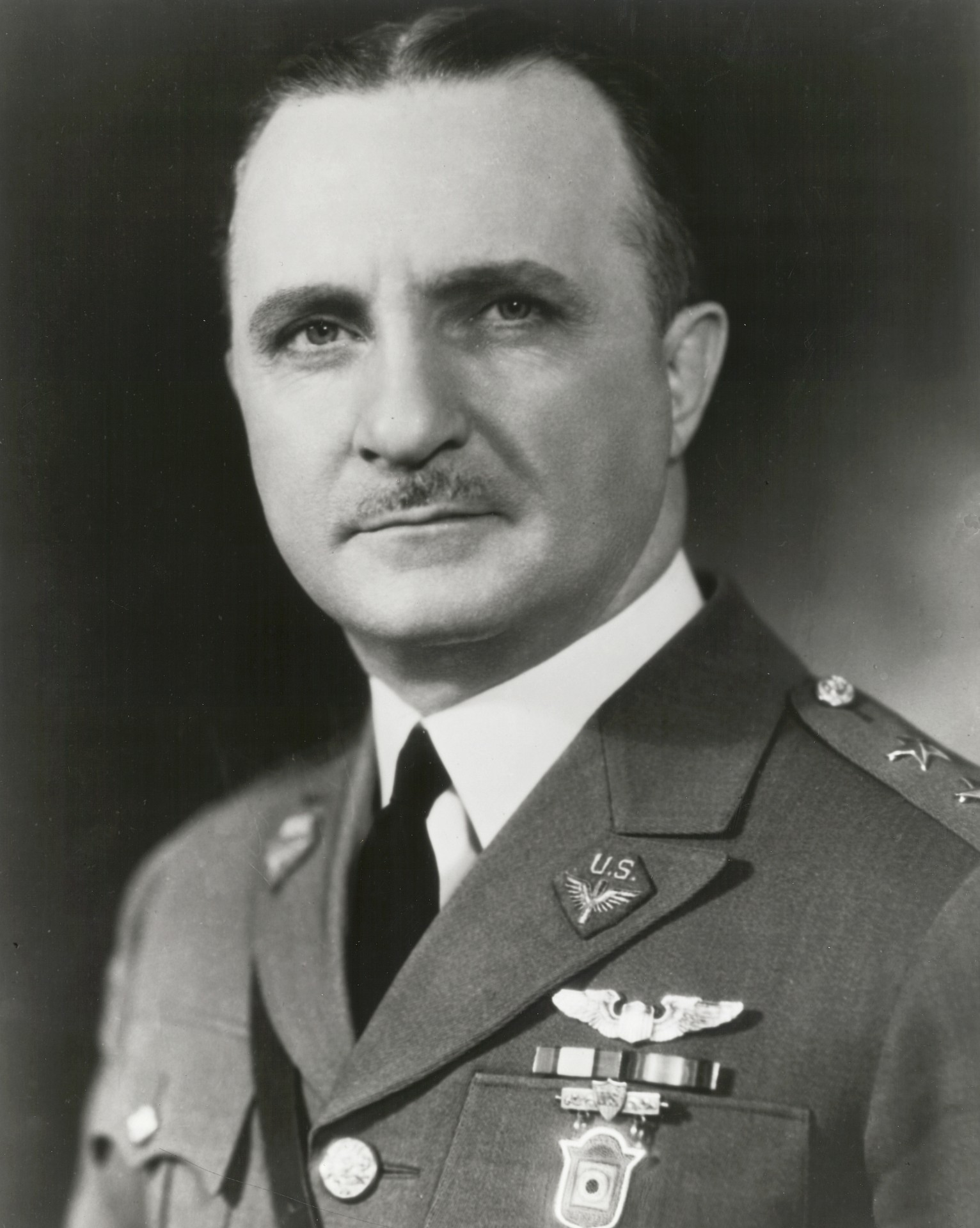
- Major General Oscar Westover
- Born: July 23, 1883; Bay City, Michigan, U.S.
- Died: September 21, 1938 (aged 55); Burbank, California, U.S.
- Burial place: Arlington National Cemetery
- Military career
- Allegiance: United States
- Branch: United States Army
- Service years: 1901–1938
- Rank: Major General
- Nickname: Tubby
- Commands: United States Army Air Corps
- Conflicts: World War I
- Awards: Army Distinguished Service Medal

Oscar M. Westover (July 23, 1883 – September 21, 1938) was a major general and fourth chief of the United States Army Air Corps.

== Early life and career ==
Westover was born in Bay City, Michigan, and enlisted in the United States Army when he was 18. He began his service as a private in 1901 before being appointed to the United States Military Academy at West Point. He graduated from there in 1906, ranked 43rd in his class, and was commissioned as a second lieutenant in the 14th Infantry. Westover was promoted to first lieutenant on April 13, 1911; to captain on July 1, 1916; and brevetted to major on October 20, 1917.

=== Air Service and Air Corps ===
In 1919, Lieutenant Colonel Westover was detailed to the United States Army Air Service to serve as Assistant Executive Officer for Director Major General Charles T. Menoher, where he butted heads with Billy Mitchell over subordination to authority, and on July 1, 1920, transferred permanently to the new Air Service branch with the rank of major. Westover served as Assistant Executive and Executive in the Office of the Chief of the Air Service (OCAS), from November 1918 to November 1920. He was appointed director of aircraft production in April 1921, serving until December 1922.

Westover attended the Air Service Balloon School in 1921, and the Air Service Airship School in 1922. He continued on to heavier-than-air flight training, completing the Air Service Primary Flying School at Brooks Field and the Advanced Flying School at Kelly Field in 1923 at the age of forty. As a result of these courses, Westover was awarded aeronautical ratings as a balloon observer, airship pilot, airplane pilot, and airplane observer, at that time every rating authorized by the Air Service.

From 1924 to 1926 he was assigned as commanding officer of Langley Field, Virginia, who was also the commandant of the Air Service Tactical School (which became the Air Corps Tactical School in 1926). He then completed the ACTS course himself in 1927. On January 13, 1930, he was promoted to lieutenant colonel and on December 22, 1931, appointed assistant to the chief of the Air Corps with temporary promotion to brigadier general. In 1932 he attended the Command and General Staff College and remained there for a stint as an instructor. On December 22, 1935, he succeeded Benjamin Foulois as Chief of the Air Corps with the accompanying promotion to major general.

The Army had in 1935 had activated an operational air formation called "General Headquarters Air Force" containing 3 of 5 existing combat wings, 9 of 15 existing combat groups, and 30 of 60 existing combat squadrons. This was not the General Headquarters of the Air Force, but was rather the Air Force of the then constituted, but not activated, General Headquarters—the planned command element for a theater of operation on mobilization in war. GHQ Air Force, activated with about 8000 soldiers was considered the equivalent of an infantry or cavalry division and was accordingly commanded by a major general. The wing commanders in GHQ Air Force went from lieutenant colonels or majors to brigadier generals or colonels at this time and corresponded with infantry or cavalry brigade commanders. The Chief of Air Corps was a branch head on par with the chiefs of Infantry, Cavalry, Field Artillery, Coast Artillery, the Corps of Engineers, the Quartermaster Corps, the Ordnance Corps, the Medical Department, the Signal Corps, Military Intelligence, and others who were tasked with manning, training, and equipping specific combat and service units as decided upon by the Army's General Staff and that had been provided to an operational commander of which there were 14 at the time—9 corps areas in the Continental United States (which in 1921 had replaced the department as the basic command level in the Army since the War of 1812) and 4 overseas departments (Philippines, Hawaii, Canal Zone, and Puerto Rico). None of the branch chiefs had operational control of units dedicated to the combat organizations of the Army. What units they did command were what was needed to train personnel. The relationship between the Chief of the Air Corps and Commanding General of GHQ Air Force was analogous to the Chief of Cavalry and Commanding General of 1st Cavalry Division. The one manned, trained, and equipped specific units as assigned by the War Department General Staff and which were in operational formations and the other employed the aggregate formation and trained it into a warfighting formation. Both the Chief of Air Corps and the Commanding General of GHQ Air Force reported to the Army Chief of Staff, albeit through different General Staff reporting channels.

GHQ Air Force was commanded by Major General Frank M. Andrews, a classmate of Westover's who had finished one place higher in class standings. Aviation advocates looking to the Royal Air Force and its independent status from the British Army and the Royal Navy, saw this "dual authority" within aviation as the primary cause many problems in unity of command, particularly since Andrews was outspoken in his advocacy of independence for the Air Corps from the Army. He and Westover clashed often over philosophical differences on this issue, Westover believed that being integrated with the rest of the Army was the priority, as had Westover with Billy Mitchell.

=== Death ===
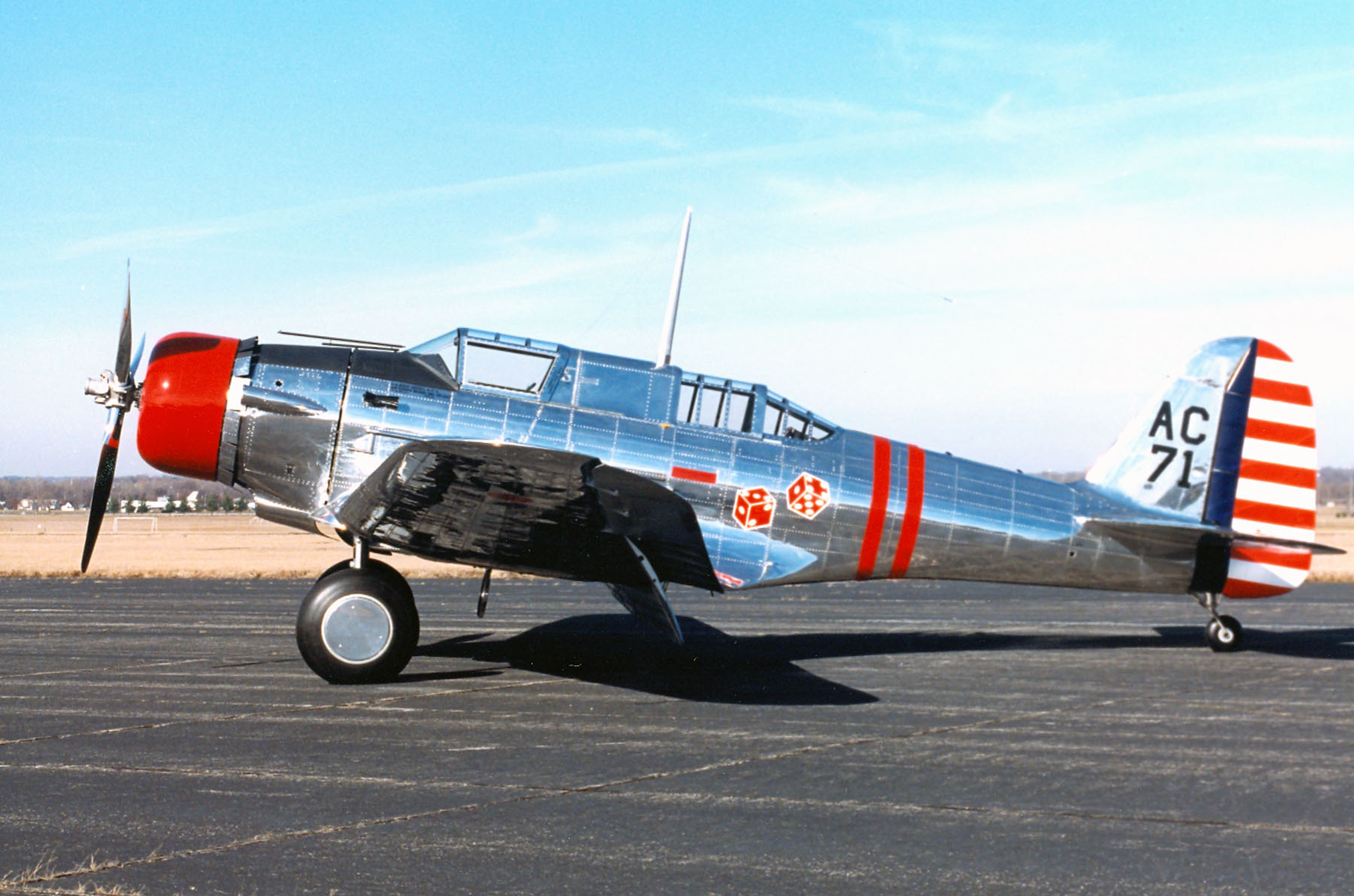
Northrop A-17A

Westover died, aged 55, in a plane crash on September 21, 1938. The Northrop A-17AS he flew, a single-engined attack aircraft used as a high-speed staff transport, had a reputation for stalling, and only a year before Colonel William McChord had been killed in the crash of one. Westover's aircraft, AC serial 36-349, experienced a high-speed stall and crashed in a crosswind short of the runway at Lockheed Aircraft's air field in Burbank, California, now known as Bob Hope Airport. The plane crashed in the front yard of a house at 1007 Scott Road in Burbank. No one on the ground was killed, but two homes were damaged by the ensuing flames. His passenger, crew chief S/Sgt Samuel Hymes, also died.

Westover was succeeded by the Assistant Chief of Air Corps, Brigadier General Henry H. Arnold on September 29.

Oscar Westover is buried in Arlington National Cemetery. Westover Joint Air Reserve Base in Chicopee, Massachusetts, formerly Westover Air Force Base and the headquarters of the Eighth Air Force, and now the largest reserve base in the Air Force as home to the 439th Airlift Wing, is named in his honor.
