= Westover Composite Squadron =

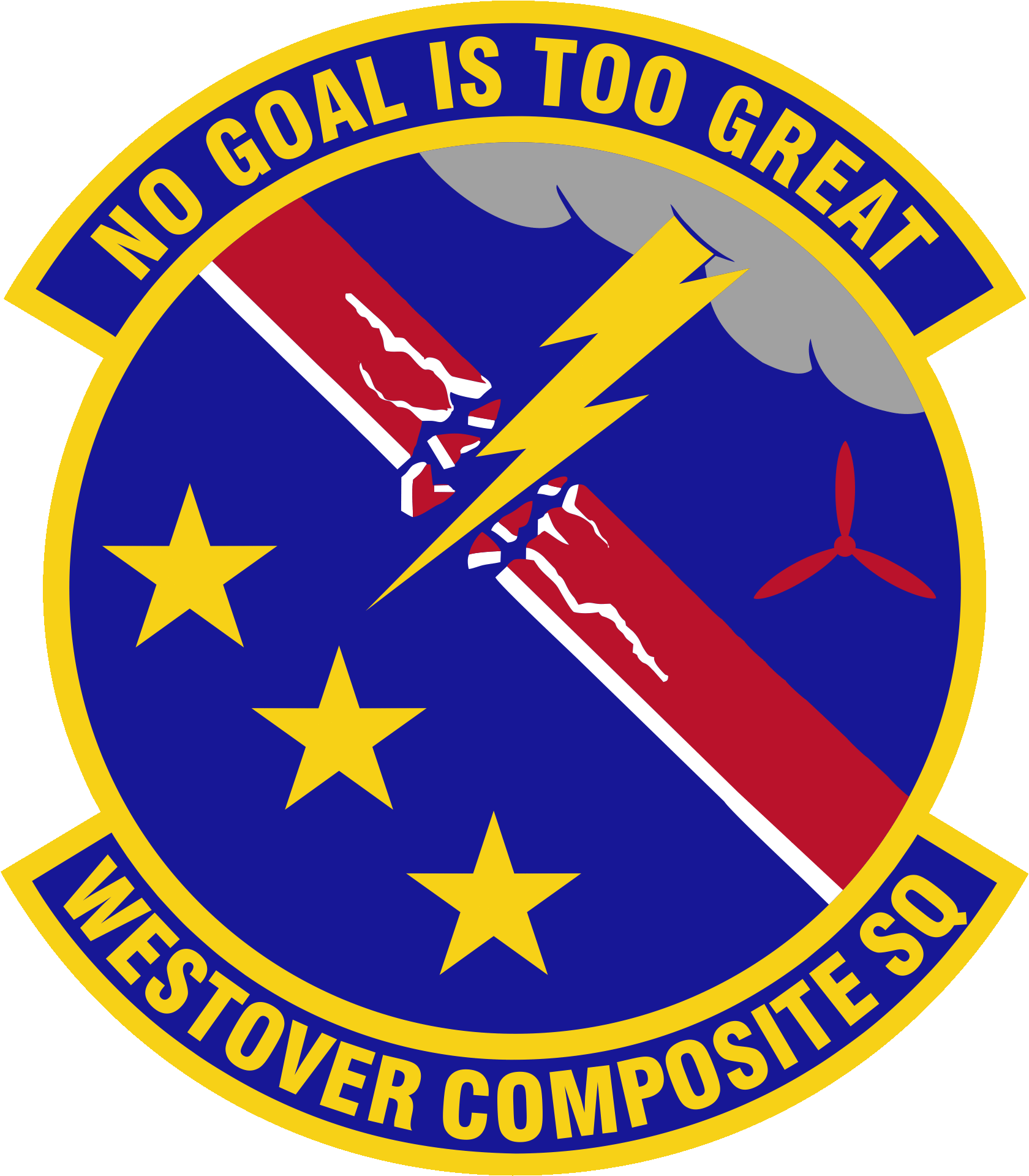
- Westover Composite Squadron Emblem
- Active: 1960 — present
- Country: United States
- Branch: Civil Air Patrol, civilian auxiliary of the United States Air Force
- Type: Composite
- Role: Auxiliary
- Size: 86
- Part of: Air Combat Command, First Air Force
- Garrison/HQ: Westover Air Reserve Base
- Nickname: NER-MA-015
- Motto: "No Goal Is Too Great"
- Decorations: Unit Citation Award USAF Organizational Excellence Award

Commanders
- Current commander: Lieutenant Colonel Stephen Edelman

Former Squadron Emblem.

Westover Composite Squadron is a squadron of the Civil Air Patrol, the auxiliary of the United States Air Force. It is assigned to the Massachusetts Wing Civil Air Patrol and is based at Westover Air Reserve Base, Massachusetts.

The squadron is tasked with the promotion and execution of the Civil Air Patrol's three missions in Western Massachusetts: sharing the promotion of cadet programs, emergency services, and aerospace education with the Franklin County Composite Squadron.

== History ==
=== World War II ===
Westover Air Reserve Base, then known as Westover Field, was built in 1939 in anticipation of its need under the looming threat of war. As a national organization, the Civil Air Patrol was created on December 1, 1941, in response to an observed need to support civil defense and general aviation during World War II. References to Civil Air Patrol at Westover can be found, but the most recent charter for the Westover Composite Squadron is dated in the 1960s, so it can be inferred that there were a few decades when Westover Air Reserve Base did not have a Civil Air Patrol presence.

=== The 1950s ===
As the war ended, Civil Air Patrol's focus shifted from the coastal patrols of World War II to search and rescue and other civil defense engagements. Sensing this shift and recognizing a need to create highly trained search and rescue teams, then Pennsylvania Wing Civil Air Patrol commander Colonel Phillip Neuweiler observed some pararescuemen at Westover Air Base. This relationship lead to the organization of a Civil Air Patrol Ranger School on Westover Air Base in 1953, which eventually moved back to Pennsylvania Wing and became Hawk Mountain Ranger School

== The Squadron Today ==
Today, Westover Composite Squadron is a tenant unit at Westover Air Reserve Base and supports each other's operations and missions. The most high-profile evidence of this support is at the Great New England Air Show, held bi-annually at Westover Air Reserve Base. Westover Composite Squadron personnel support the show by manning vendor booths and operating several other stations at the show, as well as serving as a force-multiplier to the Air Force when needed. The squadron is also integral in the Wreaths Across America dedication at the Agawam National Veteran's Cemetery held each year in December. Westover Composite Squadron personnel serve as masters of ceremonies for the dedication and work hand-in-hand with active duty military personnel to distribute wreaths to the veterans interred in the cemetery. The squadron is also well-known for the creation of Operation Overload, an annual winter event whereby the squadrons collects new toys to be donated to local charities. In 2015, this same event led to the donation of over 600 toys to the Ronald McDonald House Charities.

=== Cadet Programs ===
Westover Composite Squadron has celebrated a large, dedicated cadet corps throughout its existence. In 2010, the squadron's Color Guard competed in the Civil Air Patrol National Cadet Competition after earning a victory at the regional level of competition.

Each summer, the squadron sends a handful of cadets to Massachusetts Wing Civil Air Patrol's encampment in Massachusetts where they learn advanced leadership skills and teamwork. Cadets who graduate encampment can advance further in the cadet program and often choose to return to the encampment as staff members or attend a National Cadet Special Activities, with National Blue Beret and the National Emergency Services Academy at Camp Atterbury in Indiana the most popular choices.

To join as a cadet (members aged 12–21 years old), prospective members are grouped as a cohort to observe three meetings and gain a deeper understanding of the Civil Air Patrol. After the observation period, if cadets are still interested in joining, they are all processed together and form a "Tango" flight where other cadets and senior members mentor the new members. Within this program, cadets are to strive and earn their first achievement within three months, after which they are promoted to either alpha or bravo flight.

=== Emergency Services ===
Westover Composite Squadron has an emergency services department with slightly under one-half of all personnel holding at least a General Emergency Services (GES) rating, allowing its members to respond to disaster relief efforts or participate in a SAREX. The unit has custody of a Cessna 182T aircraft with a Garmin G1000 glass cockpit, allowing Civil Air Patrol members to conduct their missions with more precision.

In 2011, the squadron directly assisted in the clean-up of the aftermath of an EF3 tornado that hit Springfield, Massachusetts

=== Aerospace Education ===
The squadron is dedicated to its aerospace education mission and informing both the public and its members about flight. Members have given various presentations at CAP and non-CAP engagements; including encampment, rotary clubs, and other charitable organizations. The squadron is also active in orientation flights, where cadets are taken through a syllabus and are taught the basics of flight under the tutelage of a certified orientation flight pilot.

Cadets also participate in the model rocket program, learning the basics of flight and chemistry as they build and design increasingly complex rockets.
