= 731st Airlift Squadron =

731st Airlift Squadron

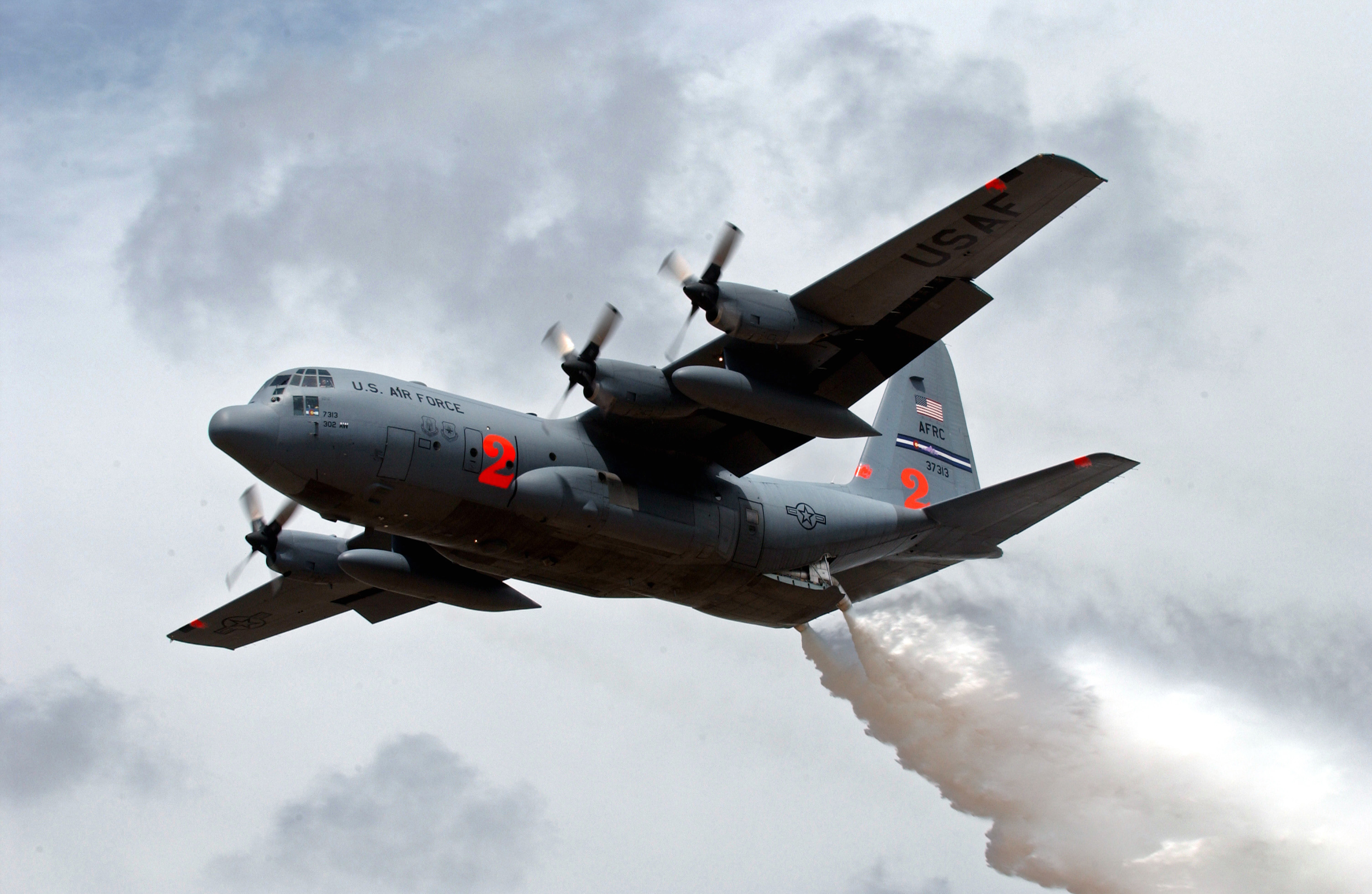
- A 731st Airlift Squadron C-130 Hercules conducts annual Modular Airborne Fire Fighting System training
- Active: 1942–1945; 1947–1951; 1952–1982; 1982–present
- Country: United States
- Branch: United States Air Force
- Role: Airlift
- Part of: Air Force Reserve Command
- Garrison/HQ: Peterson Space Force Base
- Motto: Eternal Vigilance
- Engagements: European Theater of Operations
- Decorations: Distinguished Unit Citation; Air Force Outstanding Unit Award; Republic of Vietnam Gallantry Cross with Palm

Insignia
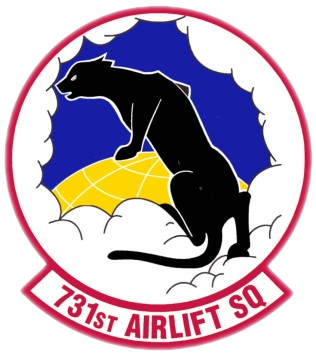
- 731st Airlift Squadron emblem (Note: Restored and modified 22 July 1996.)

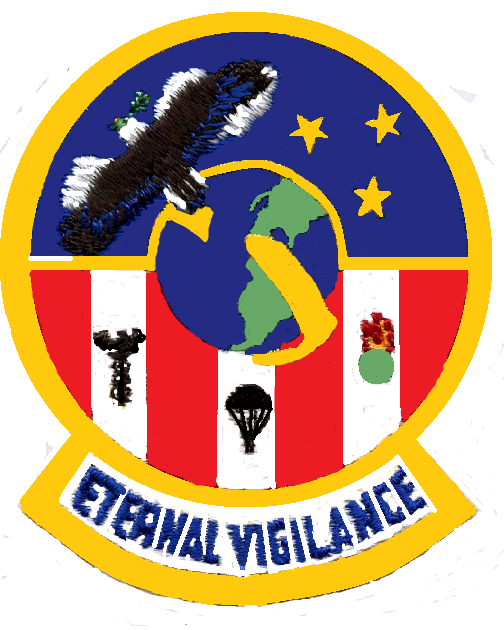
- 731st Tactical Airlift Squadron emblem

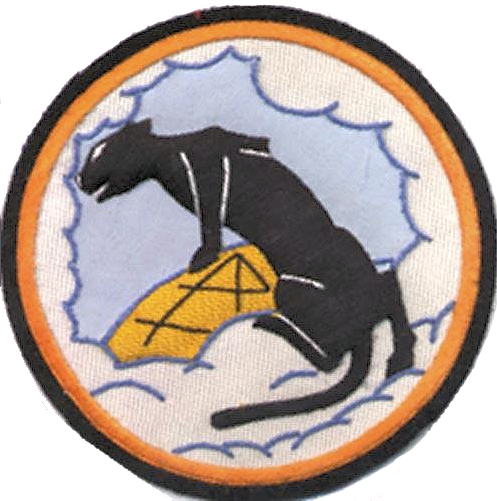
- 331st Bombardment Squadron emblem (Note: Approved 10 April 1943. Description: On a disc within a red border a black panther proper standing on a white cloud formation in base and leaning on a yellow globe marked with lines of latitude and longitude, exposed by a rift in the cloud formation, all in front of a light blue sky. Maurer, Combat Squadrons, p. 408.)
- World War II fuselage code: QE

Aircraft flown
- Transport: C-130H

The 731st Airlift Squadron is a flying unit of the United States Air Force assigned to the Air Force Reserve Command and part of the 302d Airlift Wing at Peterson Air Force Base, Colorado. It operates Lockheed C-130H Hercules aircraft providing global airlift. The squadron also has the specialized mission of Modular Airborne Fire Fighting System.

The squadron was activated in June 1942 as the 331st Bombardment Squadron. After training in the United States, the squadron deployed to the European Theater of Operations in the spring of 1943. It participated in the strategic bombing campaign against Germany until V-E Day, earning two Distinguished Unit Citations for its actions. It returned to the United States in December 1945, and was inactivated at the Port of Embarkation.

The squadron was reactivated at Marietta Army Air Field, Georgia in the reserves in 1947, but was not fully manned or equipped until 1949, when it began to receive Douglas B-26 Invaders. It was inactivated on 20 March 1951 after being called to active duty for the Korean War, with its personnel used as "fillers" to bring other units up to strength.

When the Air Force reserves revived their combat units in 1952, the squadron was activated as a tactical reconnaissance unit. It briefly returned to the light bomber role in 1955, but in 1957, became an airlift unit as the 731st Troop Carrier Squadron. It has served as a reserve airlift unit since then, including a period on active duty during the Cuban Missile Crisis.

== Mission ==
The primary operational mission of the squadron is tactical airlift and airdrop. The squadron also has the specialized mission of aerial fire fighting employing the U.S. Forest Service's Modular Airborne Fire Fighting System, as well as an aeromedical evacuation mission.

== History ==
=== World War II ===
==== Initial organization and training ====
The squadron was activated at MacDill Field, Florida, on 15 June 1942 as the 331st Bombardment Squadron, one of the original squadrons of the 94th Bombardment Group. The AAF had decided to concentrate training of heavy bomber units under Second Air Force, and the squadron moved to Pendleton Field, Oregon, one of that command's bases, two weeks later to begin training with the Boeing B-17 Flying Fortress.

The squadron cadre received its initial training at Pendleton. It moved to different bases for Phase I (individual training) and Phase II (crew training), completing Phase III (unit training) at Pueblo Army Air Base, Colorado. The air echelon of the squadron began ferrying their aircraft to the European Theater of Operations around the first of April 1943. The ground echelon left Pueblo on 18 April for Camp Kilmer, New Jersey and the New York Port of Embarkation on 18 April. They sailed aboard the RMS Queen Elizabeth on 5 May, arriving in Scotland on 13 May.

==== Combat in the European Theater ====
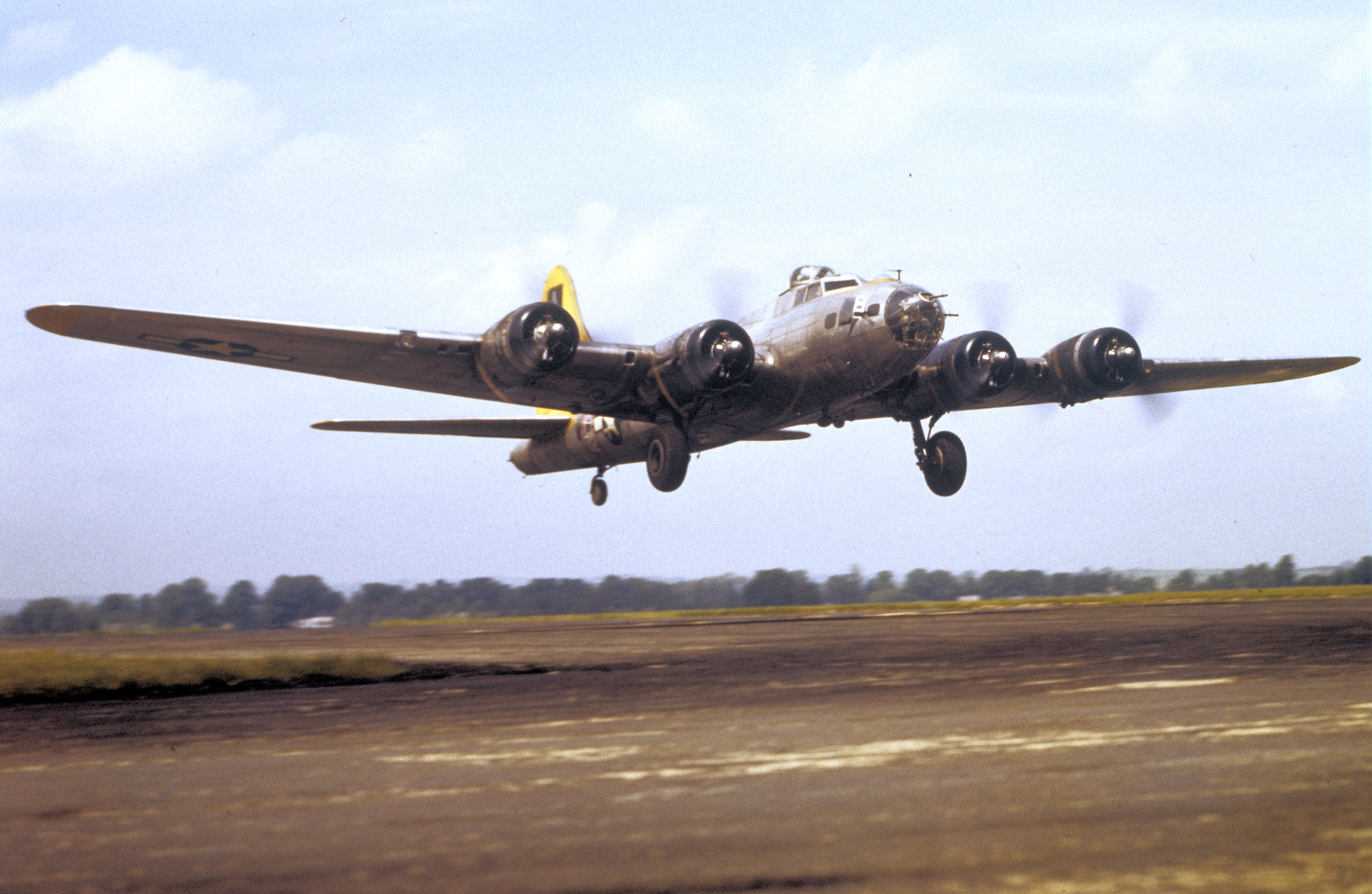
94th Group B-17 taking off from RAF Bury St Edmunds

The squadron began assembling at RAF Earls Colne in mid May, but Eighth Air Force decided to transfer its new Martin B-26 Marauder units from VIII Bomber Command to VIII Air Support Command and concentrate them on bases closer to the European continent. As a result, the 323d Bombardment Group moved to Earls Colne on 14 June, forcing the 94th Group and its squadrons to relocate to RAF Bury St. Edmunds, which would be its combat station for the rest of the war. It flew its first combat mission (and what would be its only mission from Earls Colne) on 13 June against the airfield at Saint-Omer, France. Until the end of the war, the squadron participated in the strategic bombing campaign against Germany. It attacked port facilities at Saint Nazaire, shipyards at Kiel, an aircraft plant at Kassel, oil facilities at Merseburg and ball bearing facilities at Eberhausen.

During an attack on the Messerschmitt factory at Regensberg on 17 August 1943, the squadron was without escort after its escorting Republic P-47 Thunderbolts reached the limit of their range. It withstood repeated attacks, first by enemy Messerschmitt Bf 109 and Focke-Wulf Fw 190 interceptors, then by Messerschmitt Bf 110 and Junkers Ju 88 night fighters, to strike its target, earning its first Distinguished Unit Citation (DUC). This was a "shuttle" mission, with the squadron recovering on bases in north Africa, rather than returning to England.

On 11 January 1944, it attacked a Messerschmitt aircraft parts manufacturing plant at Brunswick/Waggum Airfield. Weather conditions deteriorated during the flight to the target, preventing part of the escorting fighters from reaching the bombers and resulting in the squadron's bombers being recalled. However, the wing leader was unable to authenticate the recall message and continued to the target. In contrast, fair weather to the east of the target permitted the Luftwaffe to concentrate its fighter defenses into one of its largest defensive formations since October 1943. Despite heavy flak in the target area, the squadron bombed accurately and earned its second DUC for this action. The squadron participated in Big Week, the concentrated campaign against the German aircraft manufacturing industry from 20 to 25 February 1944. It bombed transportation, communication and petroleum industrial targets during Operation Lumberjack the final push across the Rhine and into Germany.

The squadron was occasionally diverted from its strategic mission to perform air support and interdiction missions. In the preparation for Operation Overlord, the invasion of Normandy, it flew Operation Crossbow attacks on V-1 flying bomb and V-2 rocket launch sites. On D-Day, it attacked enemy positions near the beachhead. It attacked enemy troops and artillery batteries during Operation Cobra, the breakout at Saint Lo in July 1944, and at Brest, France the following month. It attacked marshalling yards, airfields and strong points near the battlefield during the Battle of the Bulge in late December 1944 through early January 1945.

The squadron flew its last mission on 21 April 1945. Following V-E Day it dropped leaflets to displaced persons and German civilians on what were called "Nickling" flights. The squadron was scheduled to be part of the occupation forces, but those plans were cancelled in September 1945. Starting in November, its planes were transferred to other units or flown back to the United States. Its remaining personnel sailed on the SS Lake Champlain on 12 December 1945. Upon reaching the Port of Embarkation, the squadron was inactivated.

=== Reserve operations ===
==== Initial organization and mobilization for the Korean War ====
The squadron was again activated under Air Defense Command (ADC) at Marietta Army Air Field, Georgia in May 1947 as a air reserve unit and was again assigned to the 94th Bombardment Group. At Marietta, it trained under the supervision of the 420th AAF Base Unit (Reserve Training) (later the 2589th AF Reserve Flying Training Center). Although nominally a very heavy bomber unit, The squadron was only equipped with a variety of trainer aircraft, and possessed no tactical aircraft. In 1948 Continental Air Command (ConAC) assumed responsibility for managing reserve and Air National Guard units from ADC.

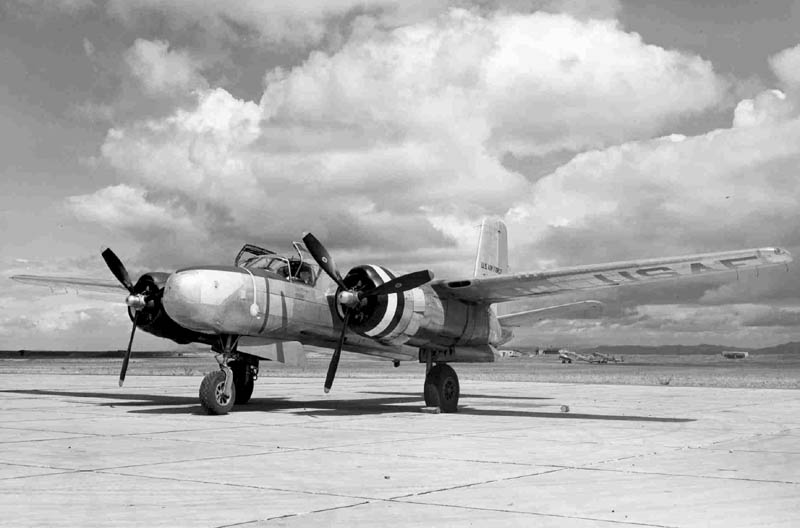
Air reserve B-26

In June 1949, the squadron was redesignated as a light bomber unit. Reserve wings were authorized four operational squadrons, rather than the three of active duty wings. However, the squadrons were manned at 25% of normal strength. The squadron began to equip with the Douglas B-26 Invader. All reserve combat units were mobilized for the Korean War. The 331st was called to active duty on 10 March 1951. Its personnel and equipment were used to bring other units up to strength, and the squadron was inactivated ten days later.

==== Reconnaissance operations ====
The squadron was reactivated at Dobbins Air Force Base in June 1952 as the 331st Tactical Reconnaissance Squadron and equipped with RB-26 Invader photographic reconnaissance aircraft when the 94th Bombardment Wing replaced the 902d Reserve Training Wing at Dobbins. The reserve mobilization for the Korean War had left the reserve without aircraft, and the squadron only began receiving aircraft in July. In addition to its primary aircraft and obsolescent North American P-51 Mustangs, the squadron also operated a variety of trainers and transports.

In the mid-1950s, the Air Force determined that all reserve units shoulld be designed to augment the regular forces in the event of a national emergency. However, there were six reserve flying training wings, including the 8711th Pilot Training Wing at Scott Air Force Base, Illinois, that had no mobilization mission. On 18 May 1955, the 8711th and other reserve training wings were discontinued and replaced by tactical wings. The squadron moved to Scott, where it once again became the 331st Bombardment Squadron and replaced its reconnaissance model B-26s with tactical bomber versions.

==== Airlift operations ====
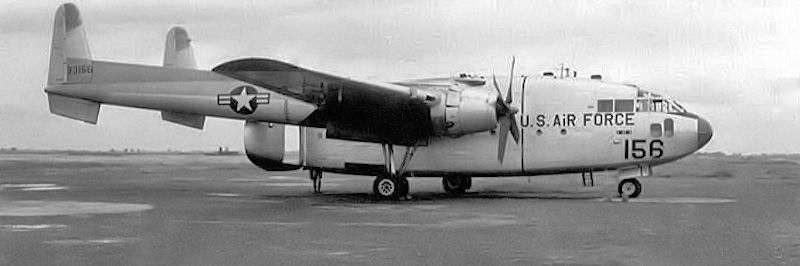
C-119 Flying Boxcar as flown by the squadron

The Joint Chiefs of Staff were pressuring the Air Force to provide more wartime airlift. At the same time, about 150 Fairchild C-119 Flying Boxcars became available from the active force. Consequently, in November 1956 the Air Force directed ConAC to convert three reserve fighter bomber wings to the troop carrier mission by September 1957. In addition, within the Air Staff was a recommendation that the reserve fighter mission given to the Air National Guard and replaced by the troop carrier mission. As a result, the 94th Wing moved to Laurence G. Hanscom Field, Massachusetts, where it replaced the 89th Fighter-Bomber Wing and became a troop carrier organization. The squadron became the 731st Troop Carrier Squadron, (Note: The number change was required because a regular 331st Troop Carrier Squadron was active at Sewart Air Force Base, Tennessee. Maurer, Combat Squadrons, pp. 55-56.) and re-equipped with Fairchild C-119s. Airlift missions were flown regularly, not only in the United states, but from 1959, to overseas destinations.

The squadron was called to active duty for a second time on 28 October 1962 for the Cuban Missile Crisis. It was returned to the reserve on 28 November, (Note: Caldwell dates the return date as 22 November. Caldwell, p. 191. Ravenstein agrees with Maurer a that the date was 28 November. Ravenstein, p. 132.) as tensions eased. Since 1955, ConAC dispersed its flying units under the Detached Squadron Concept. Mobilizing units was not a problem when the entire wing was called to active service, but mobilizing a single flying squadron and elements to support it proved difficult. This weakness was demonstrated in the partial mobilization of reserve units during the Berlin Crisis of 1961. To resolve this, Continental Air Command, (ConAC) determined to reorganize its reserve wings by establishing groups with support elements for each of its troop carrier squadrons at the start of 1962. This reorganization would facilitate mobilization of elements of wings in various combinations when needed. The mobilization of the 94th Wing and its squadrons for the Cuban missile crisis delayed its reorganization until February 1963, when the 901st Troop Carrier Group was activated as the command element for the squadron, along with support elements for the 731st.

In April 1965, a military coup d'etat overthrew the elected government of the Dominican Republic. President Johnson directed American forces to its capital, Santo Domingo, to protect American lives and restore order in Operation Power Pack. This operation expanded to an effort not only to restore order, but to establish a government friendly to the United States. The 94th Wing and its squadrons provided airlift support during the crisis, which included not only missions directly supporting the operation, but flights to alleviate airlift shortages within the United States by taking over routes normally flown by Tactical Air Command and Military Air Transport Service transports.

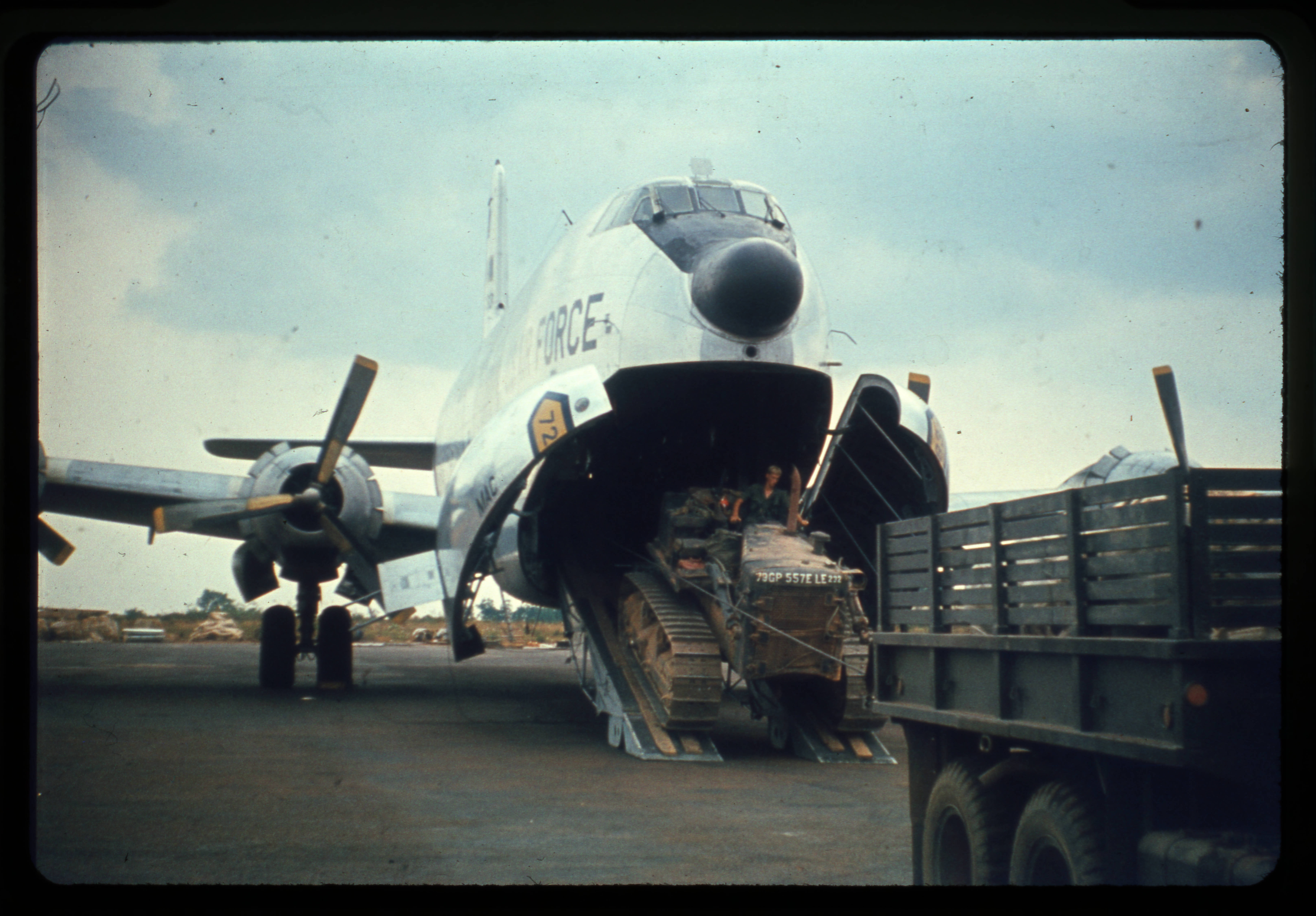
C-124 unloads a bulldozer in South Vietnam

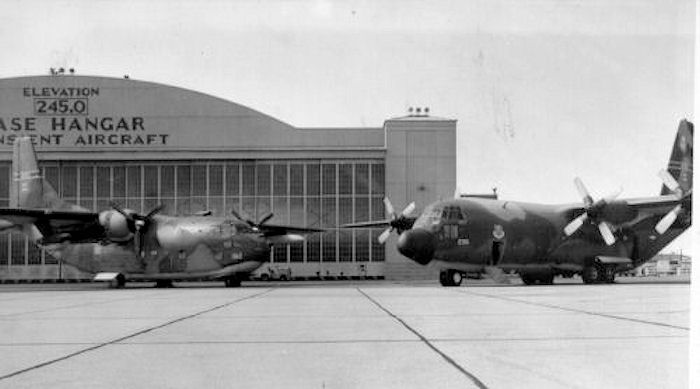
Squadron C-123 and 337th Tactical Airlift Squadron C-130 at Westover

In 1966, the squadron began converting to the Douglas C-124 Globemaster II for performing strategic airlift, and was renamed the 731st Military Airlift Squadron on 1 January 1967. With the C-124, it flew worldwide missions, including cargo and passenger flights to Southeast Asia, supporting combat operations. As the C-124 was being withdrawn from the fleet, the squadron converted to Fairchild C-123 Providers in 1972, becoming the 731st Tactical Airlift Squadron. The following year, as Air Force flying operations at Hanscom ended, the squadron moved to Westover Air Force Base, Massachusetts. In April 1974, the 901st Tactical Airlift Group and the 905th Tactical Airlift Group were inactivated, as the 439th Tactical Airlift Wing assumed responsibility for all reserve flying operations at Westover. The squadron continued to participate in military exercises, global airlift, and humanitarian missions until it was inactivated on 1 October 1982.

The squadron was activated the same day at Peterson Air Force Base, Colorado and equipped with Lockheed C-130 Hercules. It was once again assigned to the 901st Tactical Airlift Group. In 1985, the 901st was inactivated and replaced by the 302d Tactical Airlift Wing. In 1992, as Air Force Reserve Command (AFRC) implemented the Objective Wing organization, the squadron became the 731st Airlift Squadron and was reassigned to the 302d Operations Group.

During Operation Desert Shield and Desert Storm squadron members deployed to support active duty operations. At the end of the Gulf War, the squadron supported Operation Provide Comfort, air dropping food and supplies to Kurdish refugees. The wing also supported Operation Restore Hope in Somalia, Operation Coronet Oak in Panama, Operation Provide Promise, humanitarian airlift to Bosnia and hurricane relief to Homestead Air Force Base, Florida.

In December 2001, the squadron became one of the first AFRC C-130 units to mobilize and deploy in support of Operation Noble Eagle and Operation Enduring Freedom, flying airlift missions from bases in Europe. The squadron was later activated in support of U.S. Central Command operations in Southwest Asia in 2005-2006. In 1999, the wing assisted in humanitarian relief to refugees from Kosovo and Operation Allied Force. In the summer of 2008, squadron C-130 aircraft and aircrews deployed to Southwest Asia

In October 2009 the squadron began a partnership with the 52nd Airlift Squadron, an active duty associate unit, that flew the same planes as the 731st.

In January 2010, the squadron provided humanitarian aid relief for earthquake victims in Haiti during the wing's Operation Coronet Oak deployment, including airlift support to U.S. Southern Command's Operation Unified Response. In September of that year and May of 2012 the squadron deployed operations and maintenance airmen and C-130s to Southwest Asia in support of Operation New Dawn and Operation Enduring Freedom.

==== Modular Airborne Fire Fighting System ====
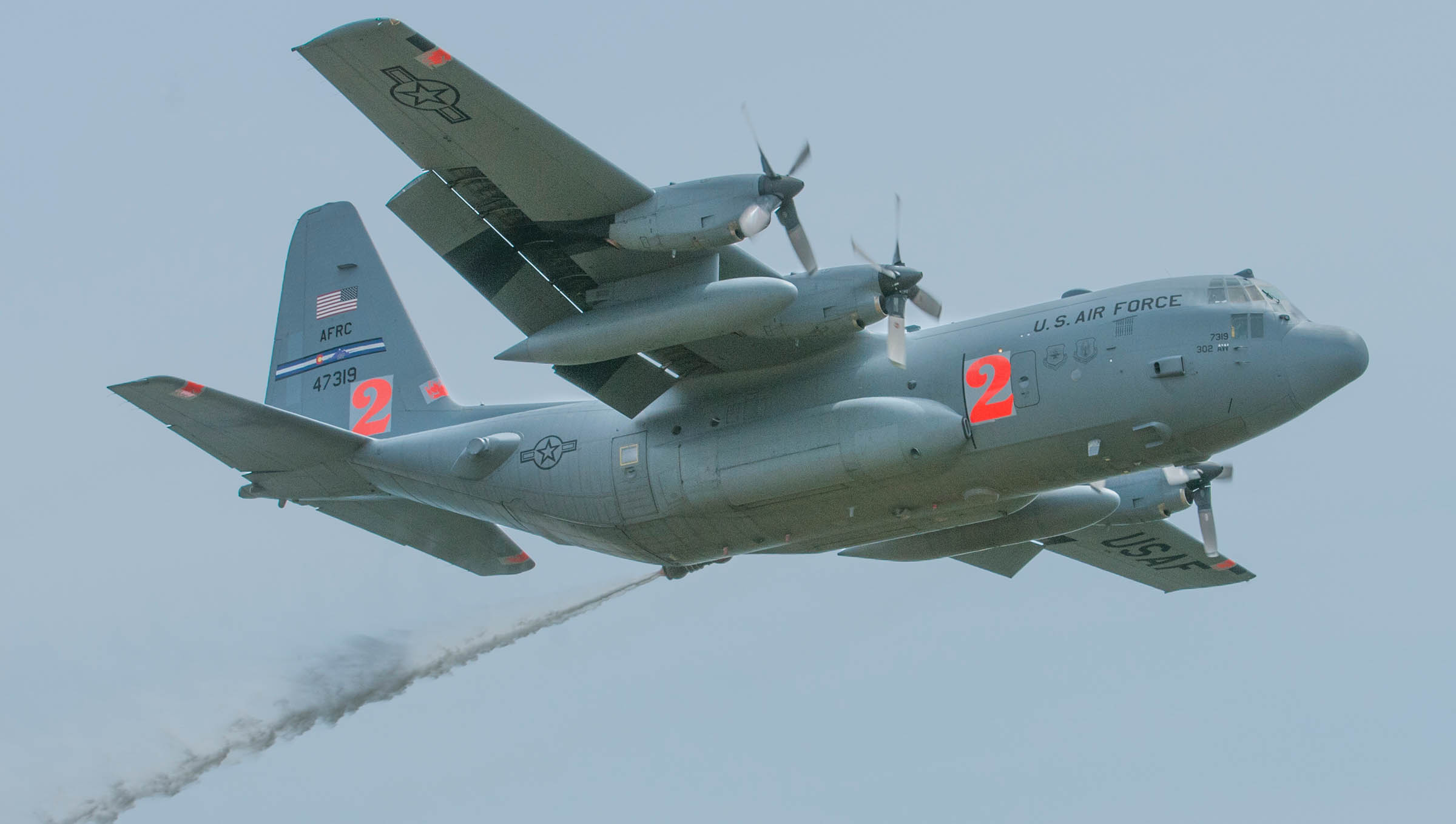
731st AS conducts MAFFS training

The squadron is the only AFRC unit trained and equipped for the Modular Airborne Fire Fighting System (MAFFS) mission, which involves air dropping fire retardant to containg wildland fires. The United States Forest Service owned MAFFS systems, which are loaded into the squadron's C-130s, can be activated and installed within hours. The squadron has flown firefighting missions throughout the western United States since it took on the reserve portion of the MAFFS mission in 1993.

MAFFS highlights interagency cooperation. The squadron belongs to the Department of Defense, yet works in concert with the National Interagency Fire Center (NIFC), and the Forest Service. The NIFC determines fire fighting needs and strategies. When it determines the use of MAFFS is required, NIFC, acting through United States Northern Command requests the use of Air Force resources.

The MAFFS system can discharge its load of 3,000 gallons in less than five seconds or can make incremental drops for multiple passes. The retardant can cover an area one-quarter of a mile long and 100 feet wide. After the aircraft discharges its retardant or water load, it can be rapidly refilled at tanker ground bases in less than twelve minutes for expedited wildfire re-attack. Squadron aircraft are identified by blaze-orange aircraft fuselage and tail markings.

== Lineage ==
- Constituted as the 331st Bombardment Squadron (Heavy) on 28 January 1942

Activated on 15 June 1942
Redesignated 331st Bombardment Squadron, Heavy on 20 August 1943
Inactivated on 29 November 1945
Redesignated 331st Bombardment Squadron, Very Heavy on 13 May 1947
Activated in the reserve on 29 May 1947
Redesignated 331st Bombardment Squadron, Light on 26 June 1949
Ordered to active service on 10 March 1951
Inactivated on 20 March 1951
Redesignated 331st Tactical Reconnaissance Squadron on 26 May 1952
Activated in the reserve on 14 June 1952
Redesignated 331st Bombardment Squadron, Tactical on 18 May 1955
Redesignated 731st Troop Carrier Squadron, Medium on 1 July 1957
Ordered to active service on 28 October 1962
Relieved from active duty on 28 November 1962
Redesignated 731st Military Airlift Squadron on 1 January 1967
Redesignated 731st Tactical Airlift Squadron on 1 October 1972
Inactivated on 1 October 1982
Activated on 1 October 1982
Redesignated 731st Airlift Squadron on 1 February 1992

=== Assignments ===
- 94th Bombardment Group, 15 June 1942 – 29 November 1945
- 94th Bombardment Group, 29 May 1947 – 20 March 1951
- 94th Tactical Reconnaissance Group (later 94th Bombardment Group, 94th Troop Carrier Group), 14 June 1952
- 94th Troop Carrier Wing, 14 April 1959
- 901st Troop Carrier Group (later 901 Military Airlift Group, 901st Tactical Airlift Group), 11 February 1963
- 439th Tactical Airlift Wing, 1 April 1974
- 901st Tactical Airlift Group, 1 October 1982
- 302d Tactical Airlift Wing (later 302d Airlift Wing), 1 April 1985
- 302d Operations Group, 1 August 1992 – present

=== Stations ===
- MacDill Field, Florida, 15 June 1942
- Pendleton Field, Oregon, 29 June 1942
- Davis-Monthan Field, Arizona, 29 August 1942
- Biggs Field, Texas, 1 November 1942
- Pueblo Army Air Base, Colorado, 3 January–17 April 1943
- RAF Earls Colne (AAF-358), England, 11 May 1943
- RAF Bury St. Edmunds (AAF-468), England, c. 13 June 1943 – 22 November 1945
- Camp Kilmer, New Jersey, c. 27–29 November 1945
- Marietta Army Air Field (later Dobbins Air Force Base), Georgia, 29 May 1947 – 20 March 1951
- Dobbins Air Force Base, Georgia, 14 June 1952
- Scott Air Force Base, Illinois, 18 May 1955
- Laurence G. Hanscom Field, Massachusetts, 16 November 1957
- Westover Air Force Base, Massachusetts, 17 September 1973 – 1 October 1982
- Peterson Air Force Base (later Peterson Space Force Base), Colorado, 1 October 1982 – present

=== Aircraft ===
- Boeing B-17 Flying Fortress (1942–1945)
- North American T-6 Texan (1947–1950, 1952–1954)
- Beechcraft T-7 Navigator (1947–1951)
- Beechcraft T-11 Kansan (1947–1951)
- Douglas B-26 Invader (1949–1951, 1953–1957)
- Curtiss C-46 Commando (1952–1955)
- North American P-51 Mustang (1953–1955)
- North American T-28 Trojan (1953–1954)
- Beechcraft C-45 Expeditor (1953–1955)
- Lockheed T-33 T-Bird (1954–1955)
- Lockheed F-80 Shooting Star (1954–1955)
- Douglas RB-26 Invader (1954–1955)
- Republic F-84 Thunderjet (1954–1955)
- Douglas C-47 Skytrain (1955)
- Fairchild C-119 Flying Boxcar (1957–1966)
- Douglas C-124 Globemaster II (1966–1972)
- Fairchild C-123 Provider (1972–1982)
- Lockheed C-130 Hercules (1982 – present)

=== Awards and campaigns ===
Award streamer	Award	Dates	Notes
	Distinguished Unit Citation	17 August 1943	331st Bombardment Squadron, Germany
	Distinguished Unit Citation	11 January 1944	331st Bombardment Squadron, Germany
	Air Force Outstanding Unit Award	12 December 1971-9 April 1972	731st Military Airlift Squadron
	Air Force Outstanding Unit Award	1 January 1975-31 December 1976	731st Tactical Airlift Squadron
	Air Force Outstanding Unit Award	1 January 1980-31 December 1980	731st Tactical Airlift Squadron
	Air Force Outstanding Unit Award	1 January 1990-31 December 1991	731st Tactical Airlift Squadron
	Air Force Outstanding Unit Award	1 January 1998-31 August 1999	731st Airlift Squadron
	Air Force Outstanding Unit Award	1 January 2001-31 August 2002	731st Airlift Squadron
	Air Force Outstanding Unit Award	1 September 2004-31 August 2006	731st Airlift Squadron
	Air Force Outstanding Unit Award	1 September 2006-2 September 2008	731st Airlift Squadron
	Air Force Outstanding Unit Award	1 September 2009-31 August 2011	731st Airlift Squadron
	Air Force Outstanding Unit Award	1 January 2016-31 December 2017	731st Airlift Squadron
	Vietnamese Gallantry Cross with Palm	1 January 1968-30 September 1972	731st Military Airlift Squadron

Campaign Streamer	Campaign	Dates	Notes
	Air Offensive, Europe	11 May 1943–5 June 1944	331st Bombardment Squadron
	Air Combat, EAME Theater	11 May 1943–11 May 1945	331st Bombardment Squadron
	Normandy	6 June 1944–24 July 1944	331st Bombardment Squadron
	Central Europe	22 March 1944–21 May 1945	331st Bombardment Squadron
	Northern France	25 July 1944–14 September 1944	331st Bombardment Squadron
	Rhineland	15 September 1944–21 March 1945	331st Bombardment Squadron
	Ardennes-Alsace	16 December 1944–25 January 1945	331st Bombardment Squadron

== See also ==
- List of United States Air Force airlift squadrons
- List of C-130 Hercules operators
- B-17 Flying Fortress units of the United States Army Air Forces
- List of A-26 Invader operators
