= Westover Air Reserve Base =

U.S. Air Force facility in Massachusetts

- Chicopee, Massachusetts in the United States
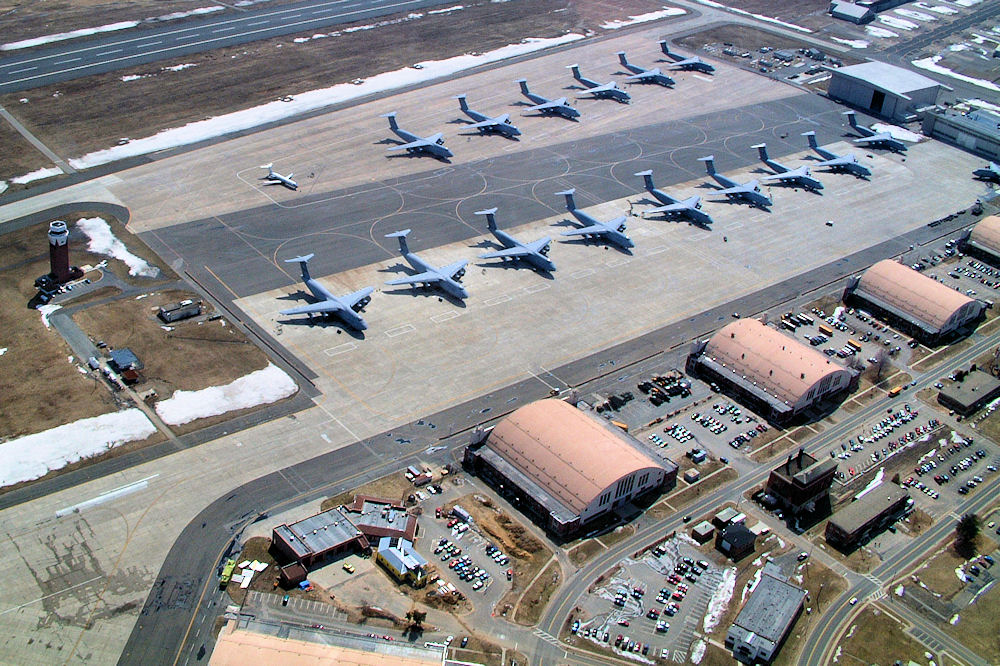
- An aerial view showing C-5 Galaxies of the 439th Airlift Wing parked on the ramp at Westover ARB

Site information
- Type: Air Reserve base
- Owner: Department of Defense
- Operator: US Air Force (USAF)
- Controlled by: Air Force Reserve Command (AFRC)
- Condition: Operational
- Website: www.westover.afrc.af.mil

Location
- Location within Massachusetts Location within the United States Location within North America Location within North Atlantic
- Coordinates: 42°11′38″N 72°32′05″W

Site history
- Built: 1939
- In use: 1939 – present

Garrison information
- Garrison: 439th Airlift Wing (host)

Airfield information
- Identifiers: IATA: CEF, ICAO: KCEF, FAA LID: CEF, WMO: 744910
- Elevation: 73.4 metres (241 ft) AMSL
Runways
Direction	Length and surface
05/23	3,534.8 metres (11,597 ft) asphalt/concrete
15/33	2,159.5 metres (7,085 ft) asphalt/concrete
- Airfield shared with Westover Metropolitan Airport; Source: Federal Aviation Administration

Westover Air Reserve Base (IATA: CEF, ICAO: KCEF, FAA LID: CEF) is an Air Force Reserve Command (AFRC) installation located in the Massachusetts communities of Chicopee and Ludlow, near the city of Springfield, Massachusetts. Established at the outset of World War II, today Westover is the largest Air Force Reserve base in the United States, home to approximately 5,500 military and civilian personnel, and covering 2,500 acres (10 km^{2}). Until 2011, it was a backup landing site for the NASA Space Shuttle and in the past few years has expanded to include a growing civilian access airport (Westover Metropolitan Airport) sharing Westover's military-maintained runways. The installation was named for Major General Oscar Westover who was commanding officer of the Army Air Corps in the 1930s.

The host unit is the 439th Airlift Wing (439 AW) of the Fourth Air Force (4 AF), Air Force Reserve Command. Outside of the AFRC command structure, the 439 AW and Westover are operationally gained by the Air Mobility Command (AMC).

Due to its location as one of the few remaining active military air bases in the northeast United States, Westover ARB is transited by many different U.S. military aircraft of all the services.

Westover ARB has the longest runway in Massachusetts.

== Units ==
439th Airlift Wing:

- 439th Operations Group

337th Airlift Squadron
439th Aerospace Medicine Squadron
439th Aeromedical Staging Squadron
439th Operations Support Squadron
439th Airlift Control Flight

- 439th Maintenance Group

439th Maintenance Squadron
439th Aircraft Maintenance Squadron

- 439th Mission Support Group

439th Force Support Squadron
439th Communications Squadron
439th Logistics Readiness Squadron
439th Civil Engineering Squadron
439th Security Forces Squadron
58th Aerial Port Squadron
42nd Aerial Port Squadron

Civil Air Patrol (USAF Auxiliary):

- Westover Composite Squadron, NER-MA-015, Massachusetts Civil Air Patrol

U.S. Army Reserve:

- 302nd Maneuver Enhancement Brigade
- 304th Transportation Company (Cargo)
- 655th Regional Support Group
- 382nd Military Police Battalion (CS)
- 287th Medical Detachment, 804th Medical Brigade
- 226th Transportation Company (Railway Operating)(assigned to the 757th Transportation Battalion (Railway), Milwaukee, WI; battalion and all subordinate units inactivated by September 2015)

U.S. Navy Reserve:

- Naval Mobile Construction Battalion 27

U.S. Marine Corps Reserve:

- Marine Wing Support Squadron 472, Detachment B
- Marine Air Support Squadron 6

Military Entry Processing Command (DOD):

- Springfield Military Entrance Processing Station (MEPS Springfield)

== History ==
Westover was constructed as "Westover Field," a then-U.S. Army Air Corps (USAAC) installation, in anticipation of World War II, part of a larger War Department plan that envisioned USAAC facilities comprising a "Northeast Air Base" that would become present day Westover Air Reserve Base; a "Southeast Air Base" that would become present day MacDill Air Force Base in Tampa, Florida; a "Southwest Air Base" that would become present day March Air Reserve Base in Riverside, California' and a "Northwest Air Base" that would become present day Fairchild Air Force Base in Spokane, Washington.

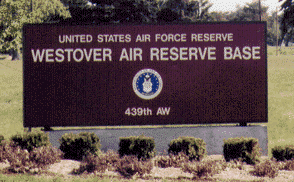
A Westover Air Force Base sign.

Following the establishment of the U.S. Air Force in 1947, Westover Field became Westover Air Force Base.

In 1951, Air Defense Command (ADC) arrived, but then turned over the base to Strategic Air Command (SAC) in 1955 with the relocation of Headquarters, Eighth Air Force (HQ 8AF) to Westover AFB. For host wing responsibilities, SAC initially established the 4050th Air Refueling Wing, later the 499th Air Refueling Wing, to operate from the base. The 99th Bombardment Wing, Heavy (99 BMW) arrived in 1956, equipped with the B-52C Stratofortress and KC-135A Stratotanker and assuming a host wing role. In case of nuclear war, an alternate SAC command bunker for HQ 8AF, called The Notch, was constructed deep within nearby Bare Mountain.

From 1954 to 1962 the Stony Brook Air Force Station in Ludlow was a nuclear weapons Operational Storage Site for Air Materiel Command (AMC-OSS), one of five in the United States. During this period, Stony Brook AFS was the home of the 3084th Aviation Depot Group, part of the 3079th Aviation Depot Wing. In 1962 Stony Brook AFS was transferred to SAC with the 24th Munitions Maintenance Squadron replacing the 3084th, and stored and maintained nuclear weapons for SAC aircraft at Westover AFB until deactivation in 1973. Today, the Stony Brook site is the home of the Massachusetts Municipal Wholesale Electric Company (MMWEC), Hampden County Jail, and other local businesses.

During the Vietnam War, 99th Bombardment Wing aircraft would routinely deploy to Southeast Asia. In 1966, the 99 BMW transitioned to the B-52D while retaining several B-52Cs were retained as proficiency training aircraft until the retirement of all B-52C airframes in 1971. In July 1969, the 57th Air Division at Westover AFB was inactivated and in July 1970, HQ 8AF relocated to Andersen Air Force Base, Guam.

=== Transfer to the Air Force Reserve ===
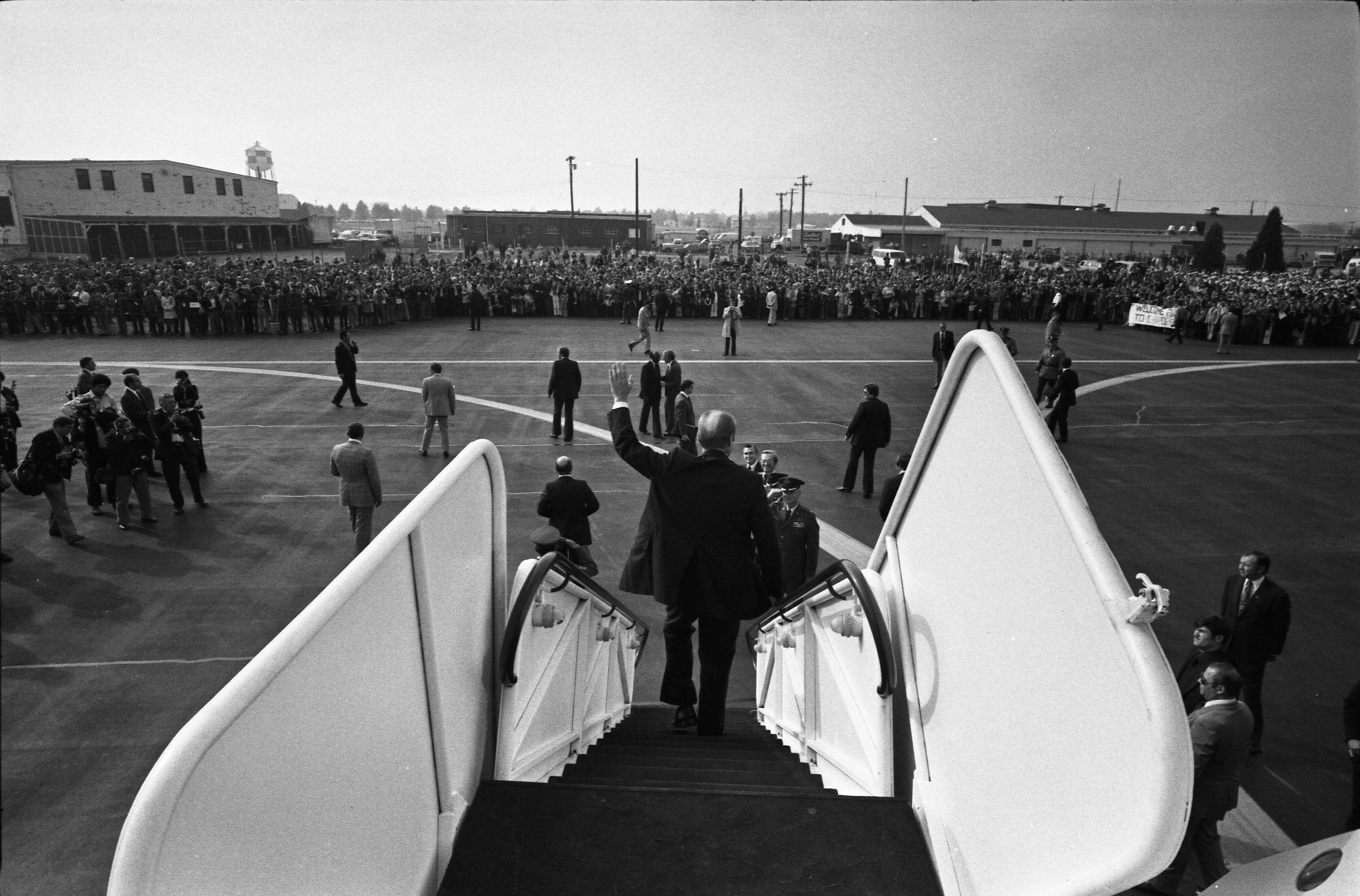
President Gerald R. Ford Waving to the Crowd at His Arrival. - 11/1975

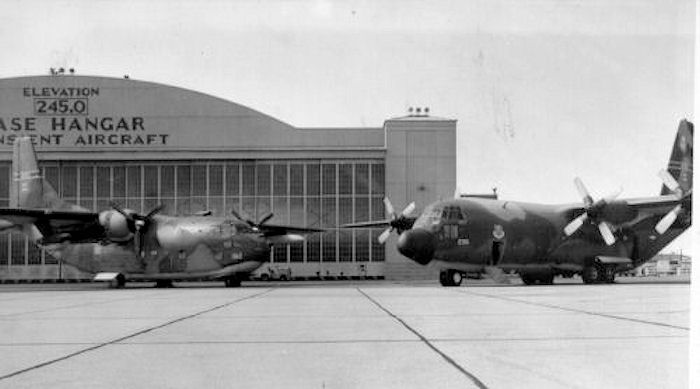
A C-123K Provider of the 731st Tactical Airlift Squadron) and a C-130B Hercules of the 337th Tactical Airlift Squadron) in front of a Westover Air Force Base hangar for a 1977 publicity photo

The end of the Vietnam War in 1973, subsequent post-Vietnam reductions in the U.S. defense budget, and a long-standing SAC initiative to retrench from most of its coastal bases to the further inland in order to increase warning time for its alert force in the event of a Soviet attack, all led to the inactivation of the 99 BMW in March 1974 and redistribution of its B-52 and KC-135 aircraft to other SAC units. Rather than close Westover AFB outright, as was being done with several other SAC installations, it was decided that base would be transferred to the Air Force Reserve (AFRES).

Following inactivation of the 99 BMW, the 439th Tactical Airlift Wing (439 TAW), an AFRES unit, relocated to Westover AFB with their C-130 Hercules and C-123 Provider airlift aircraft, assuming host wing duties for the installation. Westover AFB was officially turned over to AFRES on May 19, 1974. In From October 1987, the wing converted to the C-5A model of the C-5 Galaxy and the 439 TAW was redesignated as the 439th Military Airlift Wing (439 MAW), operationally gained by the Military Airlift Command (MAC).

In 1991, Westover AFB was renamed Westover Air Reserve Base. With the inactivation of MAC in 1992, the 439 MAW became operationally gained by the Air Mobility Command (AMC) and was redesignated the 439th Airlift Wing (439 AW), its current designation.

=== Air Force Reserve (post-1991) ===
In 1997, AFRES, an Air Force Field Operating Agency, was redesignated as Air Force Reserve Command (AFRC) and became an Air Force major command (MAJCOM) with the 439 AW falling under Headquarters, Fourth Air Force (HQ 4AF) at March ARB, California. However, the 439 AW would still be operationally gained by AMC.

The 2005 Base Realignment and Closure Commission (BRAC) ruled that Westover ARB would absorb other military units in New England. The expansion proposed the transfer of all military operations at Bradley International Airport to Westover and the nearby Barnes Municipal Airport. The exception to this decision is the 103rd Airlift Wing, which remained at Bradley. A $32 million building project accommodated the additional 1600 service members required by the plan.

The new Armed Forces Reserve Center hosts Army Reserve, Navy Reserve, Marine Corps Reserve, and Air Force Reserve operations. The Massachusetts Army National Guard also made its debut at the base.

The base celebrated its 75th anniversary with an air show on 16–17 May 2015, where the U.S. Navy Flight Demonstration Squadron, the Blue Angels. headlined the 2015 Great New England Air Show. During this time, it was announced that the Westover ARB was in the running for a squadron of the new KC-46A Pegasus air refueling aircraft. Later that year, it was announced that the base would not be receiving the plane, which instead was given to AFRC's 916th Air Refueling Wing (916 ARW) at Seymour Johnson Air Force Base. Westover was also in competition with Tinker Air Force Base and Grissom Air Reserve Base for the KC-46.

In 2017, the 439 AW retired the last of its C-5A and C-5B Galaxy aircraft and transitioned to the newer C-5M Super Galaxy.

The local government credits Westover with spurring development of the Memorial Drive corridor, including several planned hotels and a retail plaza.

== Facilities and aircraft ==
The portion of the Westover complex still under military control covers an area of 2,500 acres (10 km^{2}) which contains two runways: 5/23: measuring 11,597 ft × 300 ft (3,535 m × 91 m) and 15/33 measuring 7,085 ft × 150 ft (2,160 m × 46 m). A new Air Traffic Control tower was constructed in 2002 and the old tower was demolished.

In June 1987, a local environmental activist group, the "Valley Citizens for a Safe Environment," brought legal action against the Air Force, claiming that the then-Westover AFB, as a center for military air operations with Lockheed C-5 Galaxy aircraft, posed multiple environmental hazards to local residents, to include air pollution, noise pollution, and water contamination hazards. However, given that Westover had already transitioned to an airlift installation, lacking any of the air-dropped or air-launched ordnance storage and/or utilization hazards associated with fighter aircraft or Westover's previous status as a SAC bomber base, all of the factors claimed are also shared with similar-sized commercial airports. Westover ARB's extended operations history has produced numerous hazardous waste sites which the U.S. Department of Defense, in coordination with the Environmental Protection Agency and associated state agencies, continues to takes step to remediate.

According to Federal Aviation Administration records for the 12-month period ending 31 May 2022, the airport had 16,693 aircraft operations, an average of 46 per day: 60% military, 36% general aviation, 4% air taxi and <1% air carrier. There were 37 aircraft at the time based at this airport: 16 military, 10 single engine, 4 multi-engine, 3 jet aircraft, 2 gliders and 2 helicopter.

Military facilities are under control of Colonel Joseph D. Janik, Commander, 439th Airlift Wing. The civilian portion of the airport is run by Michael Bolton, Director of Civil Aviation (an employee of the Westover Metropolitan Corporation).

=== Major Aircraft Mishaps ===
On August 12, 1953, a United States Navy R6D-1 Liftmaster crashed after takeoff. All 4 crewmembers died.

On June 27, 1958, a USAF KC-135A Stratotanker of the 99th Bombardment Wing stalled and crashed, skidded across the Massachusetts Turnpike, disintegrated and burned. The aircraft was attempting a world speed record from New York-London with 3 other USAF KC-135s. All 15 occupants, both crew and passengers, died. This included Brigadier General Douglas Saunders, USAF, commander of SAC's 57th Air Division at Westover AFB, and six civilian journalists,

On August 10, 1959, a 99th Bombardment Wing B-52C (AF Serial Number 54-2682) crashed near New Hampton, New Hampshire when the nose radome failed in flight. Five crew in the forward part of the aircraft successfully ejected and the tail gunner in the rear of the aircraft successfully bailed out.

On June 21, 1963, a USAF Boeing KC-135A Stratotanker of the 99th Bombardment Wing crashed into a wooded hillside nearly 6 miles N of Westover AFB during an instrument approach in heavy rain. One crewmember died.

On January 7, 1971, after taking off from Westover Air Force Base, a 99th Bombardment Wing Boeing B-52C Stratofortress (AF Serial Number 54-2666) crashed into northern Lake Michigan at the mouth of Little Traverse Bay near Charlevoix, Michigan, while on a low-level training flight. All nine crew members aboard were lost. Later retrieval of wreckage indicated a catastrophic in-flight failure of the airframe. No remains of the crewmen were recovered.

=== Previous names ===
- Northeast Air Base, c. 1 August 1939
- Westover Field, 1 December 1939
- Westover Air Force Base, 13 January 1948
- Westover Air Reserve Base, 1991
- Westover Joint Air Reserve Base, 2003
- Westover Air Reserve Base, 2003

=== Major commands to which assigned ===
- Northeast Air District, Nov 1940

Re-designated First Air Force, 9 April 1941

- Air Transport Command, 1 February 1946
- Military Air Transport Service, 1 June 1948
- Strategic Air Command, 1 April 1955
- Air Force Reserve, 1 May 1974 – present

=== Major units assigned ===
- 10th Signal Platoon, 6 June 1940 – 30 June 1940
- Third Signal Service Co, 30 June 1940 – 22 July 1940
- Detachment Base HQ and 26th Air Base Squadron, 22 July 1940 – 1 December 1940
- 25th Base HQ and Air Base Squadron, 1 December 1940 – 1 October 1941
- 1st Air Force Service Command 1 October 1941 – 5 January 1942
- 34th Bombardment Group, 29 May 1941 – 22 January 1942
- 60th Transport Group, 21 May 1941 – 20 May 1942
- 13th Bombardment Group, 22 January 1942 – 30 November 1942
- 64th Troop Carrier Group, 6 June 1942 – 20 July 1942
- 301st Bombardment Group, 30 June 1942 – 3 August 1942
- 326th Fighter Group, 1 November 1942 – 12 October 1943
- 402d Fighter Group, 1 October 1943 – 12 October 1943
- 459th Bombardment Group, 29 October 1943 – 3 January 1944
- 471st Bombardment Group, 28 January 1944 – 10 April 1944
- 386th Bombardment Group, 30 September 1945 – 7 November 1945
- 409th Bombardment Group, 6 October 1945 – 7 November 1945
- 341st Bombardment Group, 6 October 1945 – 7 November 1945
- Army Air Forces (later Air Force) Separation Port, 14 October 1946 – 1 November 1949
- 1st Air Transport Group (Provisional), 15 March 1947 – 1 June 1948
- 2d Air Transport Wing (Provisional), 23 April 1947 – 2 June 1948
- Atlantic Division, Air Transport Command, 1 November 1947 – 1 June 1948
- 520th Air Transport Wing, 1 June 1948

Redesignated 1600th Air Transport Wing, 1 October 1948 – 1 April 1955

- Atlantic Division, Military Air Transport Service, 1 June 1948 – 31 May 1955
- 143d Airways & Air Communications Service Squadron, 1 June 1948

Redesignated 1917th Airways & Air Communications Squadron, 1 October 1948
Redesignated 1917th Communications Squadron, 1 July 1961 – 1984

- 8501st Air Transport Group, 27 June 1949 – 19 July 1951
- Squadron VR-6 (US Navy), 3 August 1949 – c. 10 June 1955
- 60th Fighter-Interceptor Squadron, 1 January 1951 – 18 August 1955
- 3084th Aviation Depot Squadron (Later:) Group,

Stoneybrook AFS [adjacent to Westover AFB] till 17 March 1954 – 1 November 1954

- 26th Air Refueling Squadron, 22 April 1955 – 7 August 1957
- 324th Fighter-Interceptor Squadron, 18 October 1955 – 25 June 1958
- 337th Fighter-Interceptor Squadron, 18 October 1955 – 25 June 1958
- 384th Air Refueling Squadron, 1 April 1955 – 25 June 1966
- 4050th Air Refueling Wing, 1 April 1955 – 1 January 1963
- Eighth Air Force, 13 June 1955 – 1 April 1970
- 8th Reconnaissance Technical Squadron, 1 May 1955 – 31 March 1970
- 18th Communications Squadron (Air Force), 8 May 1955 – 30 November 1973
- 57th Air Division, 4 September 1956 – 2 July 1969
- 99th Bombardment Wing, 4 September 1956 – 31 March 1974
- 24th Aviation Depot Squadron, 1 January 1957

Redesignated 24th Munitions Maintenance Squadron, 1 January 1960 – 30 September 1972

- 99th Munitions Maintenance Squadron, 30 September 1972 – 31 March 1974
- 99th Air Refueling Squadron, 22 August 1957 – 30 September 1973
- 4729th Air Defense Group, 8 July 1957 – 25 June 1958
- North Atlantic Communications Region, 2 June 1958 – 1 July 1963
- Air Force Satellite Photo Processing Laboratory

Redesignated 6594th Test Squadron, 26 January 1961 – 10 November 1965

- 76th Fighter-Interceptor Squadron, 1 February 1961 – 1 July 1963
- 499th Air Refueling Wing, 15 November 1962 – 25 June 1966
- 337th Military Airlift Squadron, 1 April 1966

Redesignated: 337th Tactical Airlift Squadron, 1972
Redesignated: 337th Military Airlift Squadron, 1 October 1987
Redesignated: 337th Airlift Squadron, 1 February 1992 – present

- 905th Military Airlift Group, 1 April 1966

Redesignated: 905th Tactical Airlift Group, 1972-1 April 1974

- 4713th Defense Systems Evaluation Squadron, 15 September 1972 – 15 April 1974
- 901st Tactical Airlift Group, 17 September 1973 – 1 April 1974
- 439th Tactical Airlift Wing, 14 March 1974

Redesignated: 439th Military Airlift Wing, 1 October 1987
Redesignated: 439th Airlift Wing, 1 February 1992 – present

== Gallery ==
Past photos of Westover

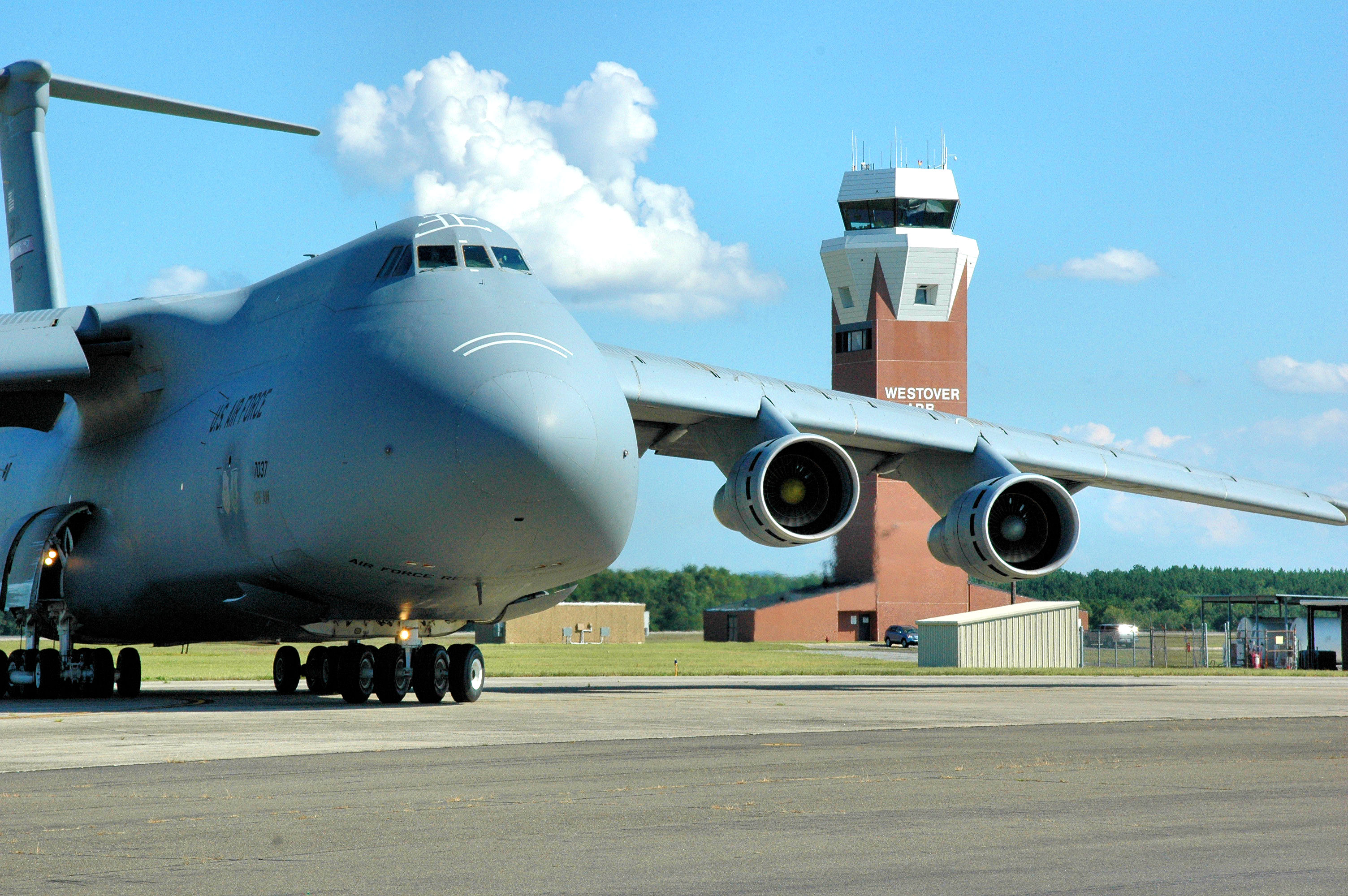
A Westover C-5B Galaxy taxies in from a local training mission.

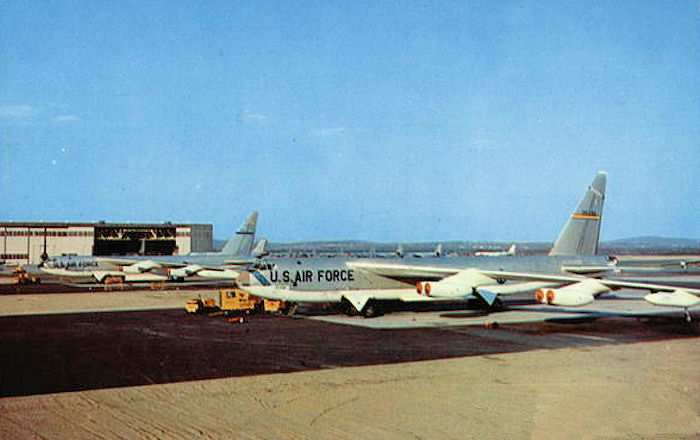
60's era USAF Postcard of Westover AFB, MA, showing B-52s of the 99th Bombardment Wing

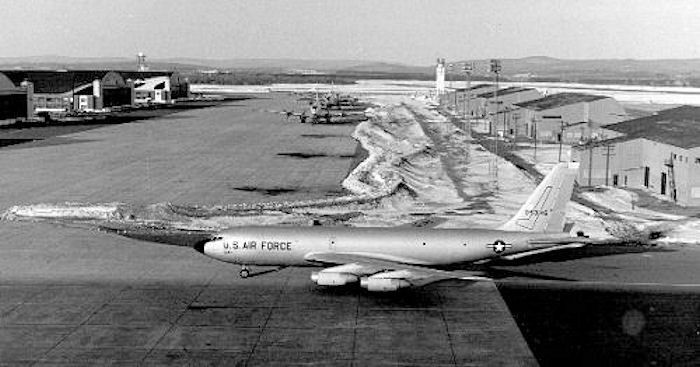
KC-135A Air Refueler from the 99th ARS taxiing parallel to the DC Hangar at Westover AFB

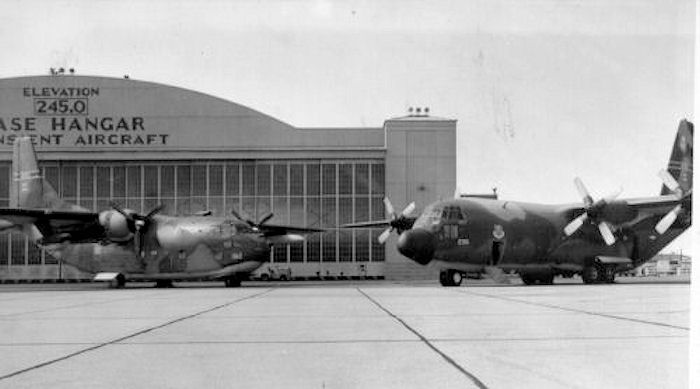
A C-123K "Provider" (731st Tactical Airlift Squadron) and a C-130B "Hercules" (337th Tactical Airlift Squadron) are in front of the Westover Air Force Base Hangar (1976)

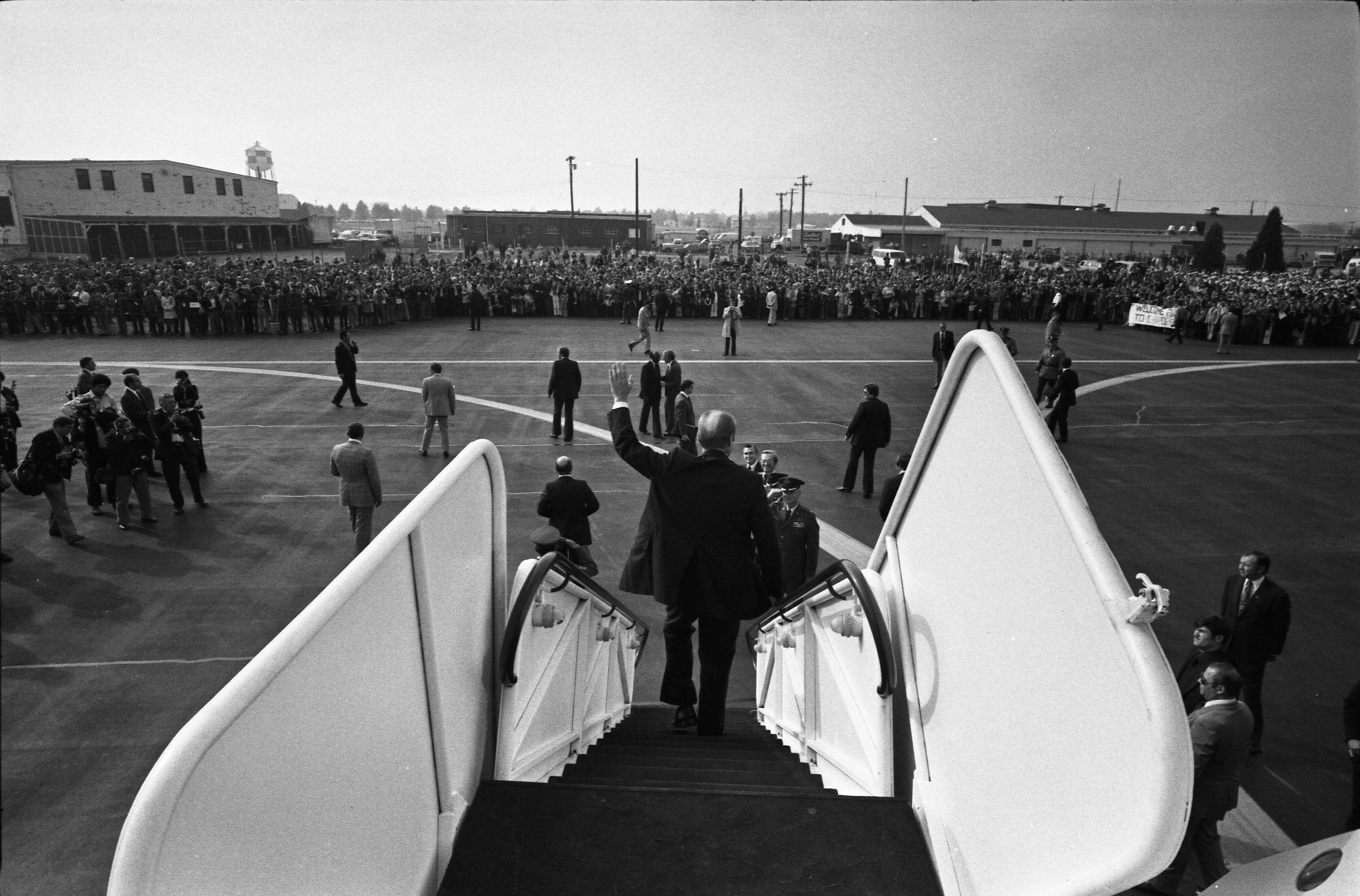
President Gerald R. Ford waving to the Crowd at His Arrival at Westover Air Force Base in Chicopee, Massachusetts (11/2/75)
Past planes of Westover

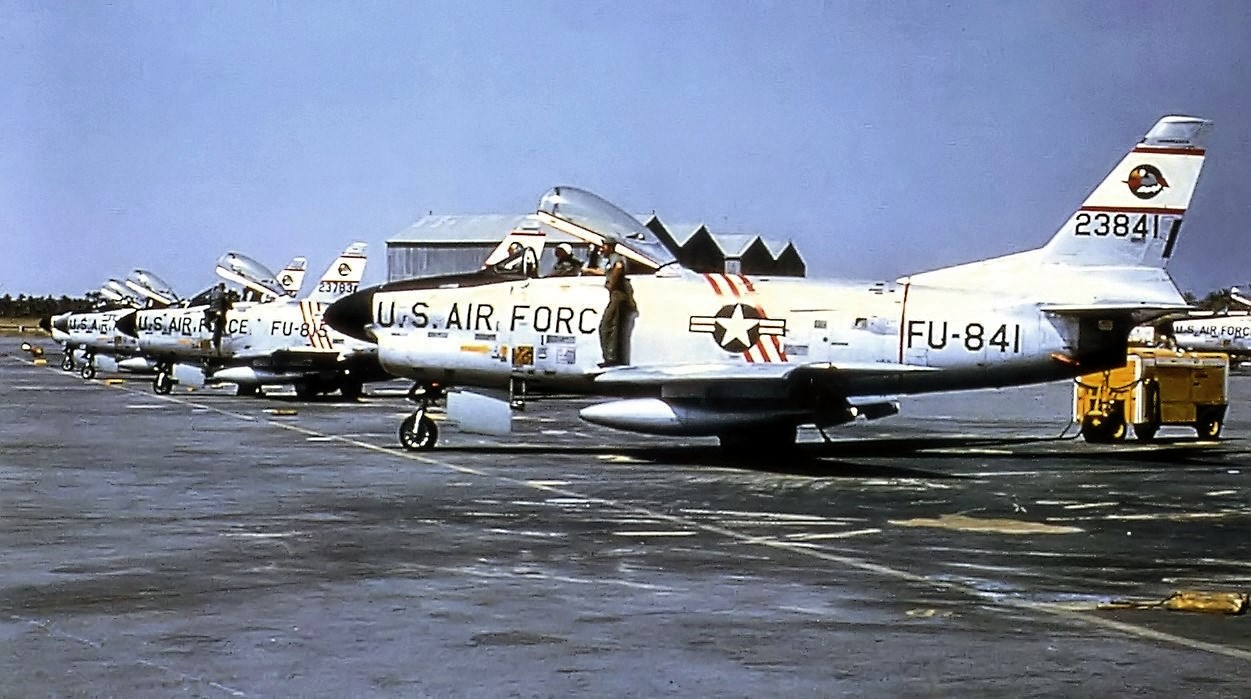
324th Fighter-Interceptor Squadron - North American F-86D-40-NA Sabre - 52-3841, at Westover AFB, MA (1956)

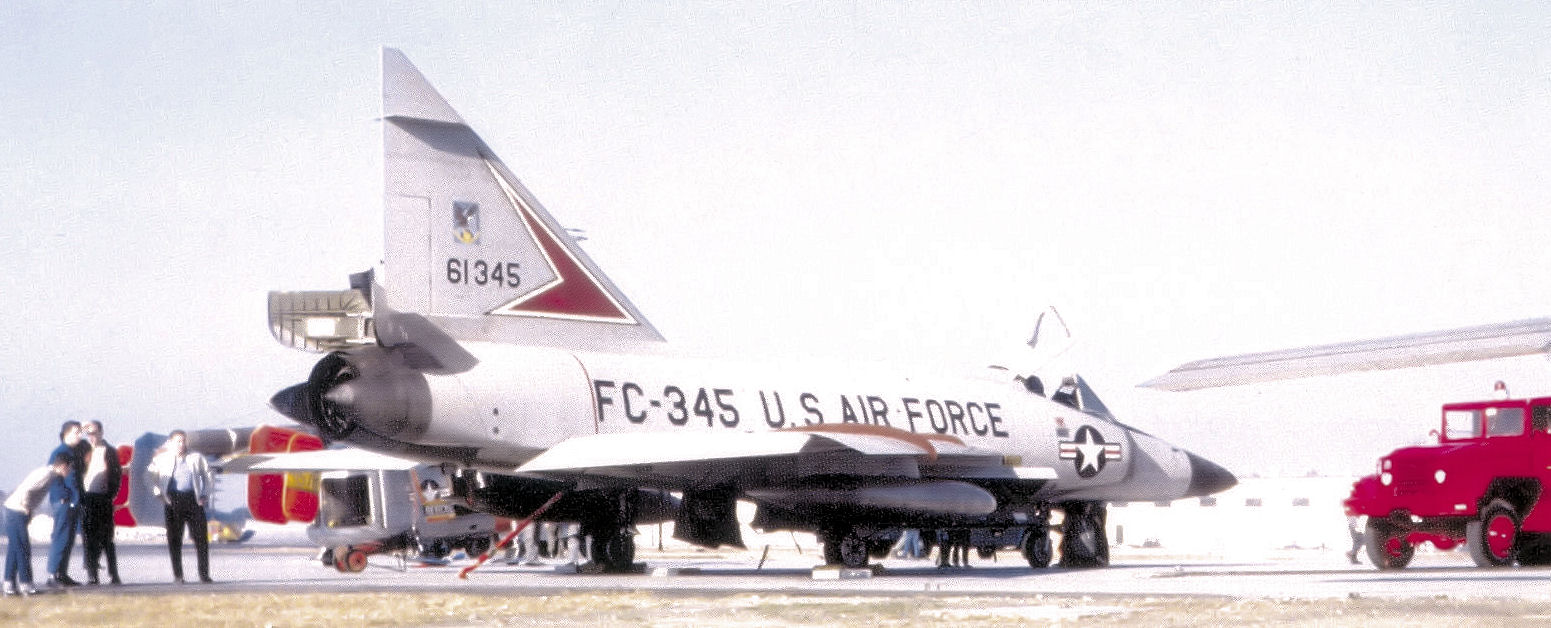
76th Fighter-Interceptor Squadron Convair F-102A-75-CO Delta Dagger 56-1345 (10/1962)

C-5 Galaxy tails on the flightline frame a C-5 on final approach May 19, 2014

A C-5B Galaxy (70041) assigned to the 439th Airlift Wing, based at Westover lands at Gdańsk Lech Wałęsa Airport in Poland. (5/2016)

A C-5M Super Galaxy (70031) assigned to the 439th Airlift Wing based at Westover on final approach to Ramstein Air Base in Germany. (4/2022)

== See also ==
- Massachusetts World War II Army Airfields
- Eastern Air Defense Force (Air Defense Command)
- List of military installations in Massachusetts
