= 439th Airlift Wing =

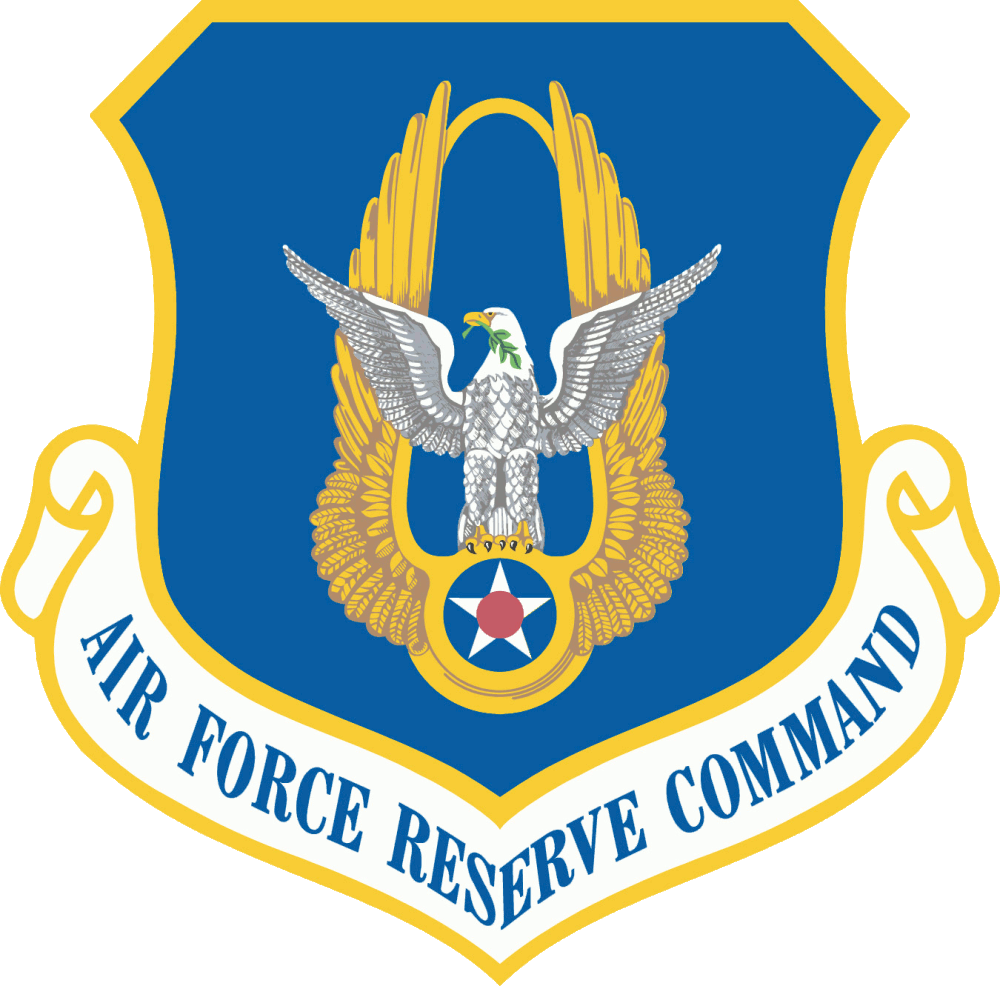
439th Airlift Wing

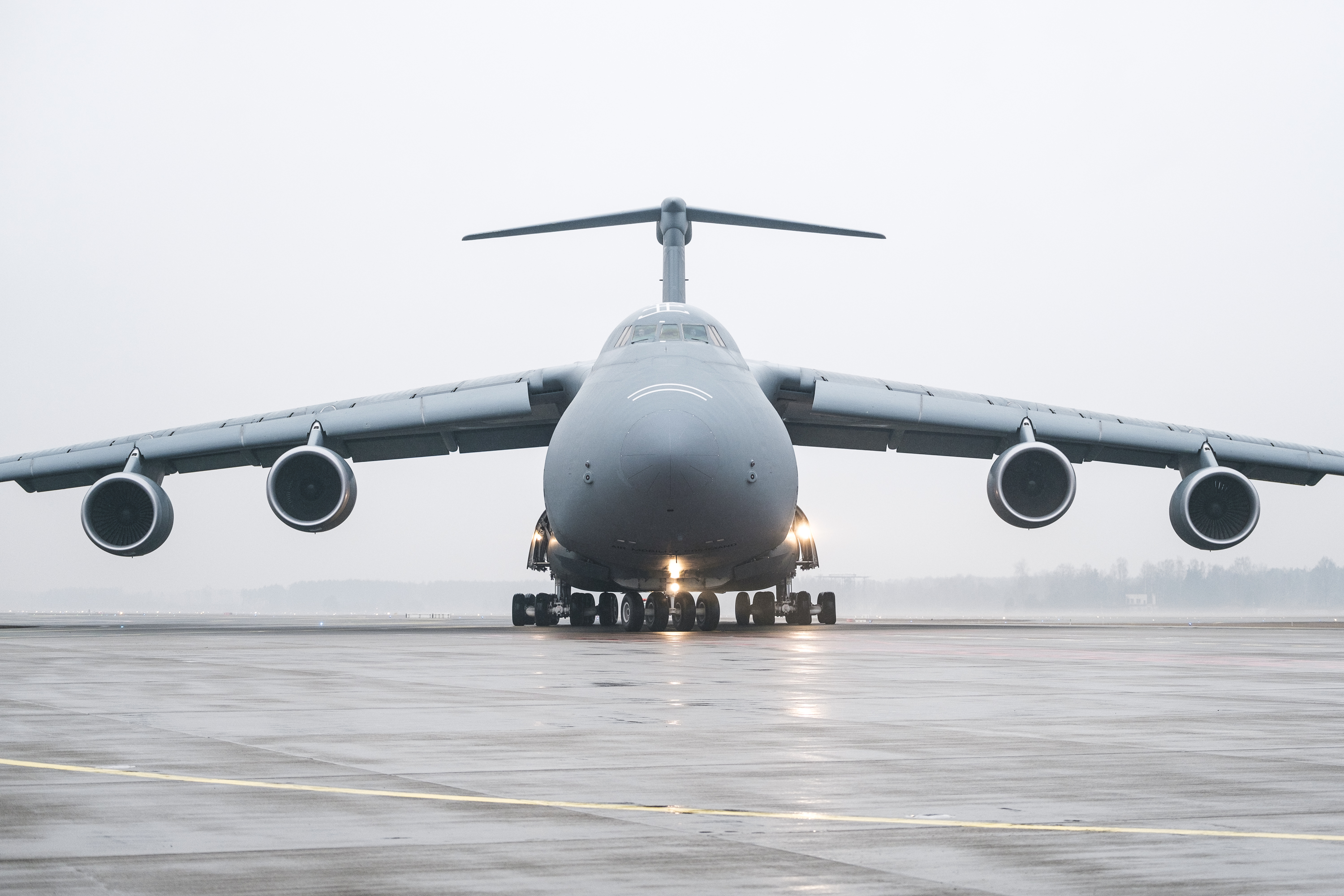
- The 439th Airlift Wing operates C-5M Super Galaxys
- Active: 1949–1951; 1952–1957; 1974–present
- Country: United States
- Branch: United States Air Force
- Type: Airlift
- Part of: Air Force Reserve Command
- Garrison/HQ: Westover Air Reserve Base
- Nickname: Patriot Wing
- Decorations: Distinguished Unit Citation; Air Force Outstanding Unit Award; Croix de Guerre with Palm; French Fourragère

Commanders
- Current commander: Colonel Christopher Holland

Insignia
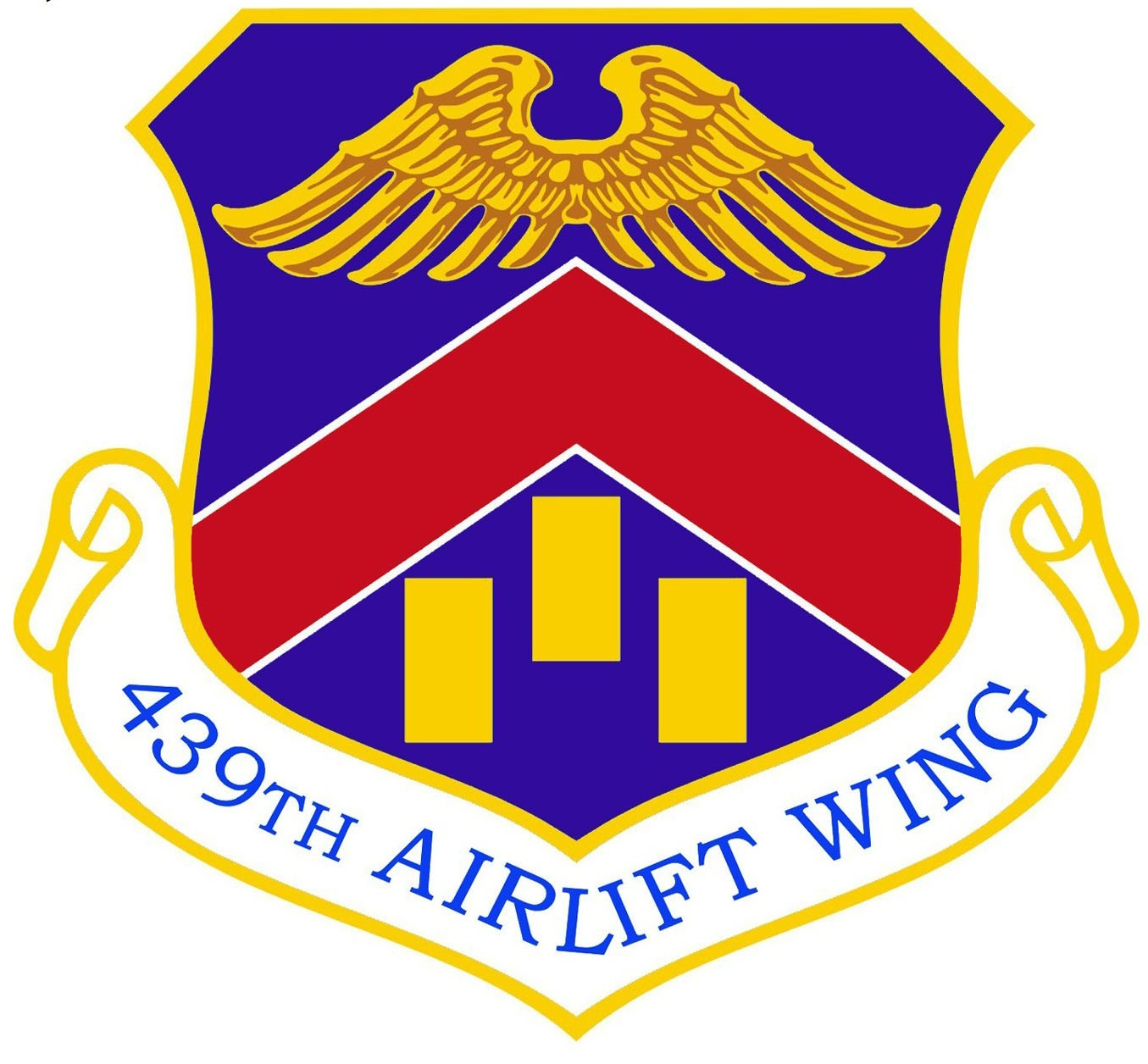
- 439th Airlift Wing emblem (Note: Approved 3 August 2010.)

Aircraft flown
- Transport: Lockheed C-5M Super Galaxy

The 439th Airlift Wing is an active United States Air Force Reserve unit. It is assigned to the Air Force Reserve Command, Fourth Air Force, and is based at Westover Air Reserve Base, Massachusetts.

The peacetime mission includes recruiting, training and supervision of personnel to assure mission readiness. The wing is also responsible for the management of aircraft maintenance and all assigned Air Force combat support real property, equipment and supplies.

== Units ==
The wing consists of the following component groups:

439th Operations Group

- 337th Airlift Squadron (337 AS) C-5M Galaxy
- 439th Aeromedical Staging Squadron (439 ASTS)
- 439th Aeromedical Evacuation Squadron (439 AES)
- 439th Operations Support Squadron (439 OSS)
- 439th Contingency Response Flight (439 CRF)

439th Maintenance Group

- 439th Maintenance Squadron (439 MXS)
- 439th Aircraft Maintenance Squadron (439 AMXS)

439th Mission Support Group

- 42d Aerial Port Squadron (42 APS)
- 58th Aerial Port Squadron (58 APS)
- 439th Civil Engineering Squadron (439 CES)
- 439th Communications Squadron (439 CS)
- 439th Force Support Squadron (439 FSS)
- 439th Security Forces Squadron (439 SFS)
- 439th Logistics Readiness Squadron (439 LRS)

== History ==
For related lineage and history, see 439th Operations Group

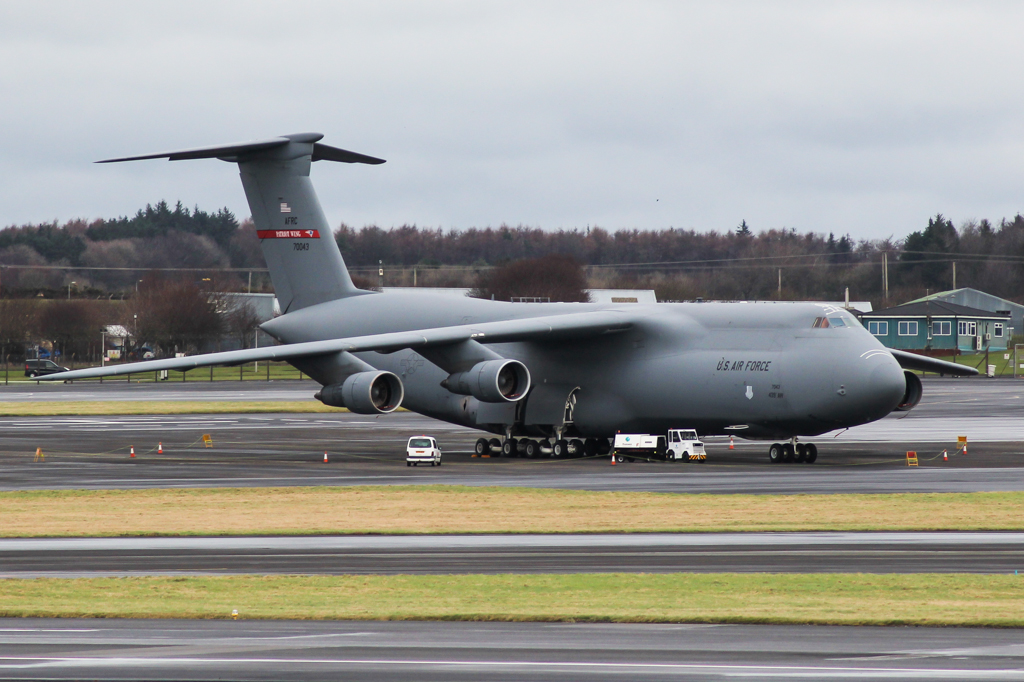
439th Airlift Wing C-5B Galaxy at Prestwick Airport, Scotland

The 439th Airlift Wing traces its origins to the 439 Troop Carrier Wing, Medium, established on 19 May 1949. Activated in the reserve on 27 Jun 1949 at Selfridge Air Force Base, Michigan with North American T-6 Texan trainer aircraft. Ordered to active service on 1 April 1951. Inactivated on 3 April 1951. Redesignated as 439 Fighter-Bomber Wing on 26 May 1952, for fighter bomber missions.

Activated in the reserve on 15 June 1952. Inactivated on 16 November 1957. Redesignated 439 Tactical Airlift Wing on 14 March 1974, with Fairchild C-123 Provider and Lockheed C-130 Hercules. Moved to Westover Air Force Base (later Westover Air Reserve Base), Massachusetts 1 April 1974. Activated in the Reserve on 1 April 1974. Redesignated as: 439th Military Airlift Wing on 1 Oct 1987, with Lockheed C-5 Galaxy. The 439th flew several relief missions to Jamaica after Hurricane Gilbert devastated that island in the fall of 1988. C-130 operations ended in 1988.

The 439th airlifted troops and equipment to Panama during Operation Just Cause, the United States invasion of Panama. Redesignated 439th Airlift Wing on 1 February 1992. In August 1992, Westover C-5s ferried supplies, vehicles and personnel to Homestead AFB, Florida, to assist in the relief efforts following Hurricane Andrew.

Wing missions included airlifting troops and cargo to Europe and southwest Asia before and during the Gulf War, Patriot missiles to Israel in early 1991, and airlift of presidential helicopters to Martinque also in 1991. Provided worldwide air movement of troops, supplies, equipment and medical patients, 2000-; transported rescue teams and equipment to New York City after the September 11 attacks terrorist attack on the US, Sep 2001; supported Operation Enduring Freedom, 2001–2002; flew tsunami relief missions in Southwest Asia, January 2005; humanitarian relief efforts after Hurricanes Katrina and Rita, August–September 2005; The wing flew relief missions after the 2010 Haiti earthquake. On June 2, 2017, the wing received its first C-5M Super Galaxy, the first of eight destined for the wing. On September 20, 2018, the wing took delivery of its last C-5M Super Galaxy.

=== Lineage ===
- Established as 439th Troop Carrier Wing, Medium on 19 May 1949

Activated in the Reserve on 27 June 1949
Ordered to active service on 1 April 1951
Inactivated on 3 April 1951

- Redesignated 439th Fighter-Bomber Wing on 26 May 1952

Activated in the Reserve on 15 June 1952
Inactivated on 16 November 1957

- Redesignated 439th Tactical Airlift Wing on 14 March 1974

Activated in the Reserve on 1 April 1974
Redesignated: 439th Military Airlift Wing on 1 October 1987
Resesignated: 439th Airlift Wing on 1 February 1992.

=== Assignments ===
- Tenth Air Force, 27 June 1949 – 3 April 1951
- Tenth Air Force, 15 June 1952 – 16 November 1957
- Eastern Air Force Reserve Region, 1 April 1974
- Fourteenth Air Force, 8 October 1976
- Twenty-Second Air Force, 1 July 1993
- Fourth Air Force, 2010 – present

=== Components ===
Groups

- 439th Troop Carrier Group (later 439th Fighter-Bomber Group, 439th Military Airlift Group, 439th Operations Group): 27 June 1949 – 3 April 1951; 15 June 1952 – 16 November 1957; 1 August 1992–present
- 911th Tactical Airlift Group: 1 October 1980 – 1 August 1992
- 914th Tactical Airlift Group: 25 January 1976 – 1 August 1992

Squadrons

- 337th Tactical Airlift Squadron (later Military Airlift Squadron): 1 April 1974 – 1 August 1992
- 731st Tactical Airlift Squadron (later 731st Military Airlift Squadron): 1 April 1974 – 1 October 1982

=== Stations ===
- Selfridge Air Force Base, Michigan, 27 June 1949 – 3 April 1951
- Selfridge Air Force Base, Michigan, 15 June 1952 – 16 November 1957
- Westover Air Force Base (later Westover Air Reserve Base), Massachusetts, 1 April 1974 – present

=== Aircraft ===
- Curtiss TC-46 Commando, 1949–1951
- Curtiss C-46 Commando, 1952–1955
- North American T-28 Trojan, 1953–1955
- North American F-51 Mustang, 1953–1954
- Lockheed T-33 T-Bird, 1953–1957
- Lockheed F-80 Shooting Star, 1953–1956
- Republic F-84 Thunderjet, 1956–1957
- North American F-86 Sabre, 1957
- Douglas TC-47 Skytrain, 1957
- Fairchild C-119 Flying Boxcar, 1957
- Fairchild C-123 Provider, 1974–1982
- Lockheed C-130 Hercules, 1974–1988
- Lockheed C-5A/B Galaxy, 1987–2017
- Lockheed C-5M Super Galaxy 2017–present

=== Operations ===
Under supervision of the 2242nd Air Force Reserve Training Center, the newly established wing trained as a troop carrier organization from 1949 until 1951 and for fighter-bomber missions from 1952 to 1957.

It replaced the 901st and 905th Tactical Airlift Groups at Westover Air Reserve Base in April 1974 and assumed tactical airlift, special operations, satellite support, and aeromedical evacuation missions. It has since taken part in tactical exercises, global airlift, and humanitarian missions. It gained two tactical groups and the responsibility for operating the military portion of Niagara Falls International Airport on 25 January 1976 and Pittsburgh International Airport on 1 October 1980, but relinquished control of those groups in 1992.

During the 1980s, the wing took part in various training exercises involving tactical airlift and rotated personnel and aircraft to Panama. It also provided airlift support for the movement and training of other units and conducted local proficiency flying training missions. At the conclusion of the Iran–Iraq War in 1989, the wing transported United Nations ceasefire observers to the Persian Gulf area. It airlifted troops and equipment to Panama during the incursion into Panama at the end of the year. The 439th airlifted troops, equipment, and supplies to support global contingency, humanitarian, and anti-drug operations during the 1990s. Additionally, its airlifts included troops and cargo to Europe and the Persian Gulf area before and during the Gulf War, and Patriot missiles to Israel in 1991.

=== Expeditions ===
- World War II
- Operation Just Cause
- Operation Desert Shield
- Operation Desert Storm
- Operation Iraqi Freedom
- Operation Enduring Freedom
- Operation Freedom Sentinel
- Operation Inherent Resolve
- Operation New Dawn
- Operation New Normal

=== Decorations ===
Air Force Outstanding Unit Awards: 1 January 1975 – 31 December 1976; 15 June 1989 – 15 June 1991; 1 October 1999 – 30 September 2001; 1 October 2001 – 30 September 2003; 1 July 2005 – 30 June 2007; 1 July 2007 – 30 June 2009

=== Campaign streamers ===
World War II: Rome-Arno; Southern France; Normandy; Northern France; Rhineland; Ardennes-Alsace; Central Europe

=== Unit shields ===
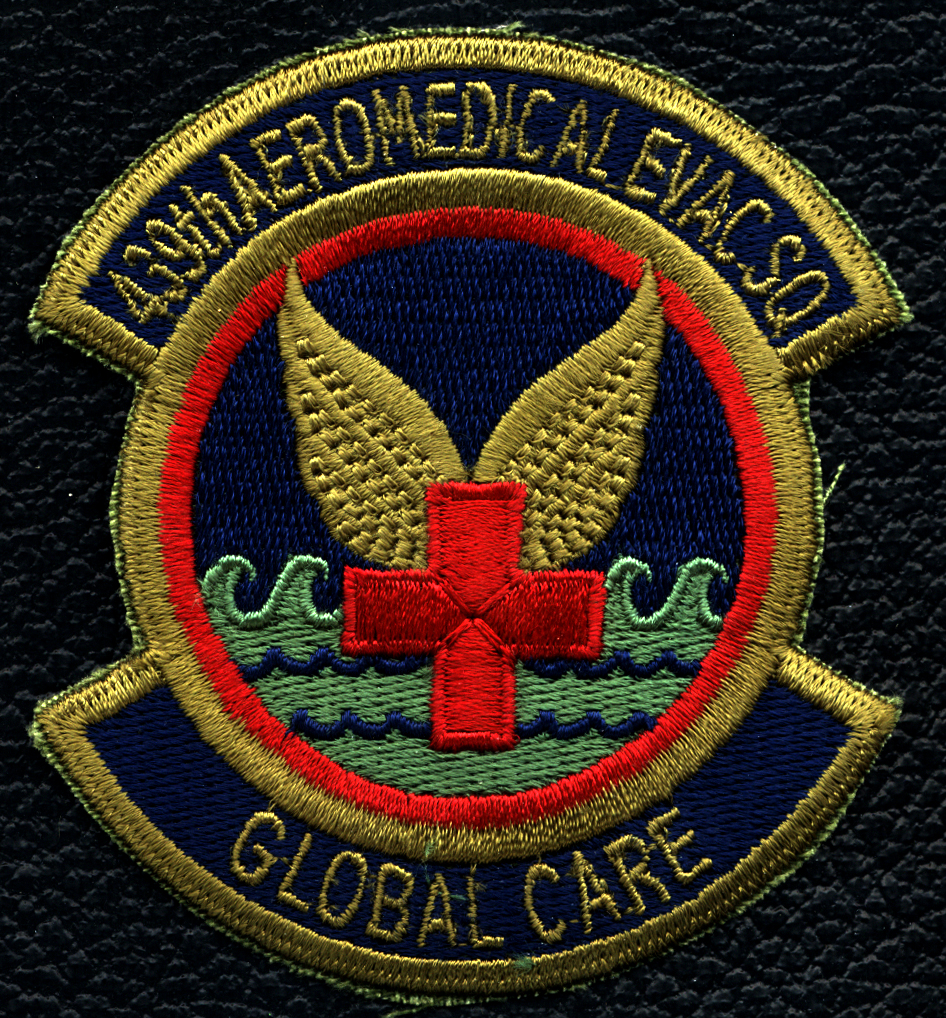
439 AES

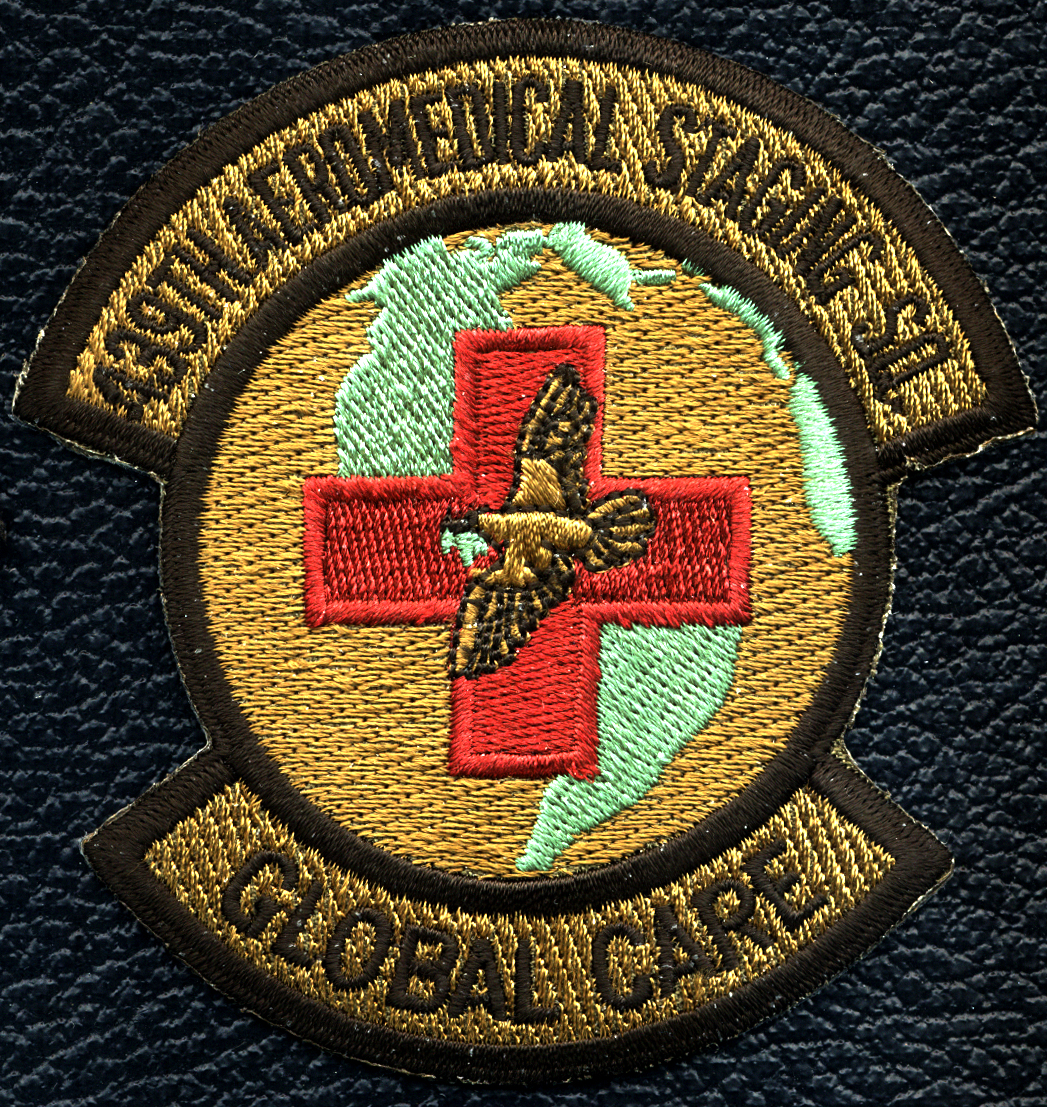
439 ASTS

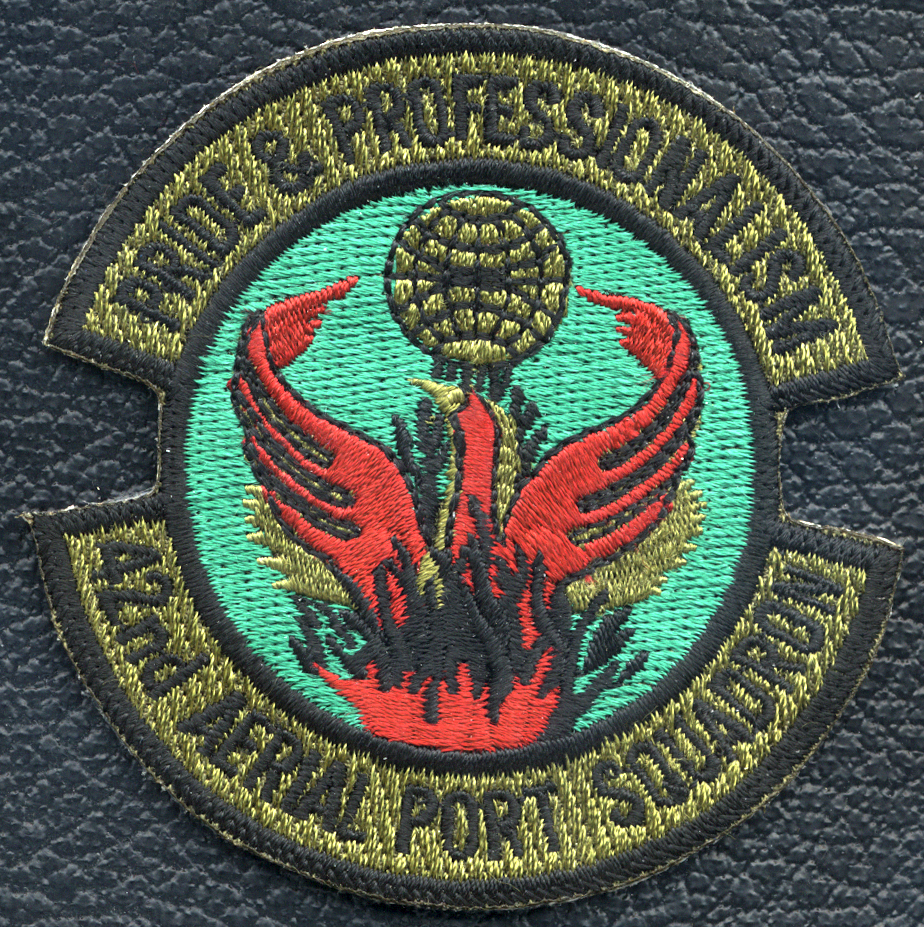
42 APS

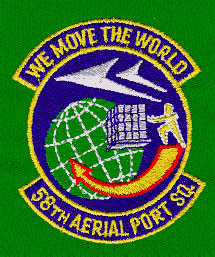
58 APS

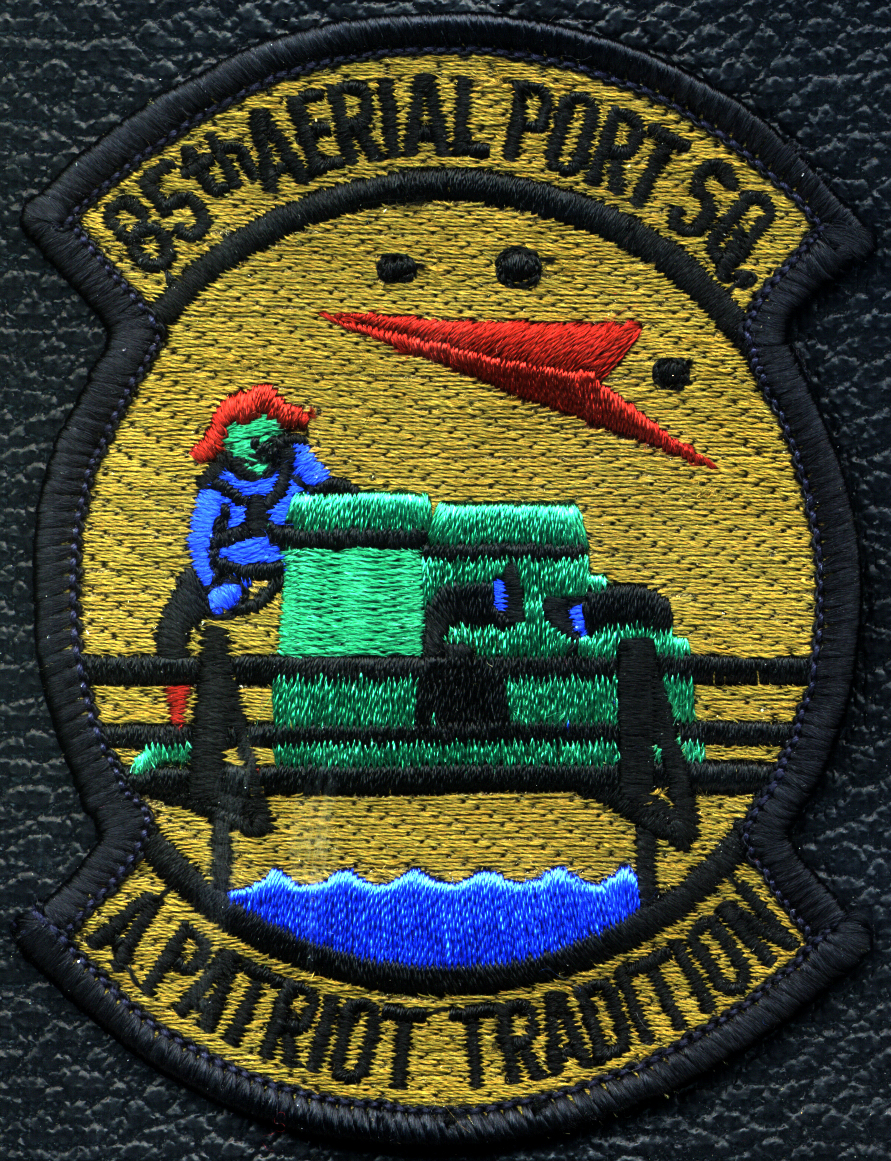
85 APS

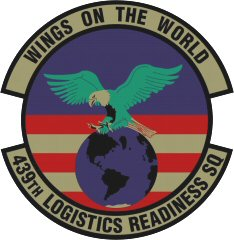
439 LRS

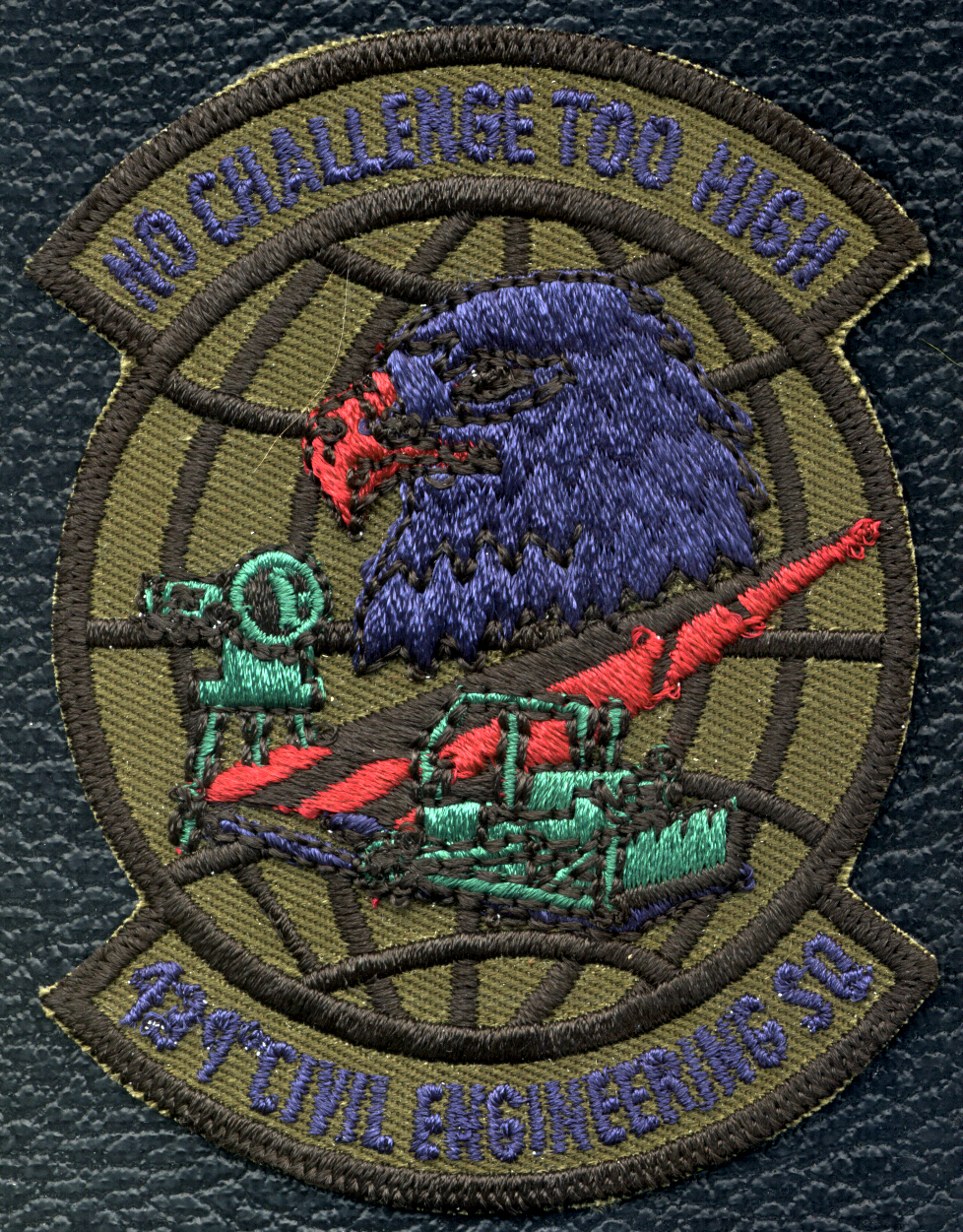
439 CES

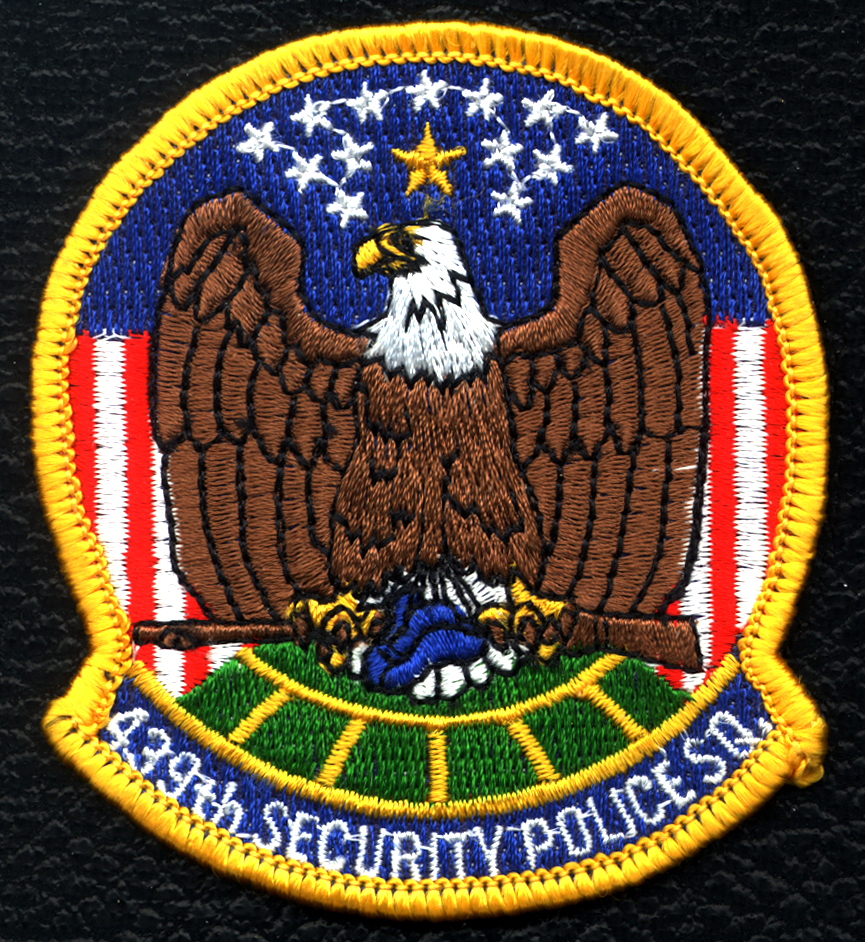
439 SFS

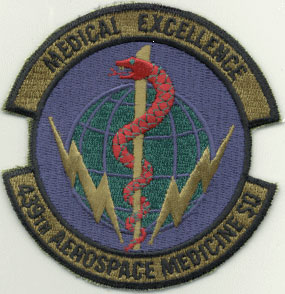
439 AMDS

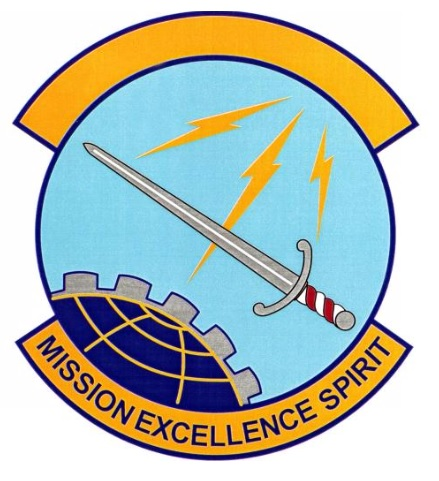
439 MXS

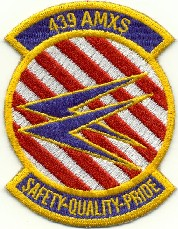
439 AMXS
