= 758th Airlift Squadron =

758th Airlift Squadron

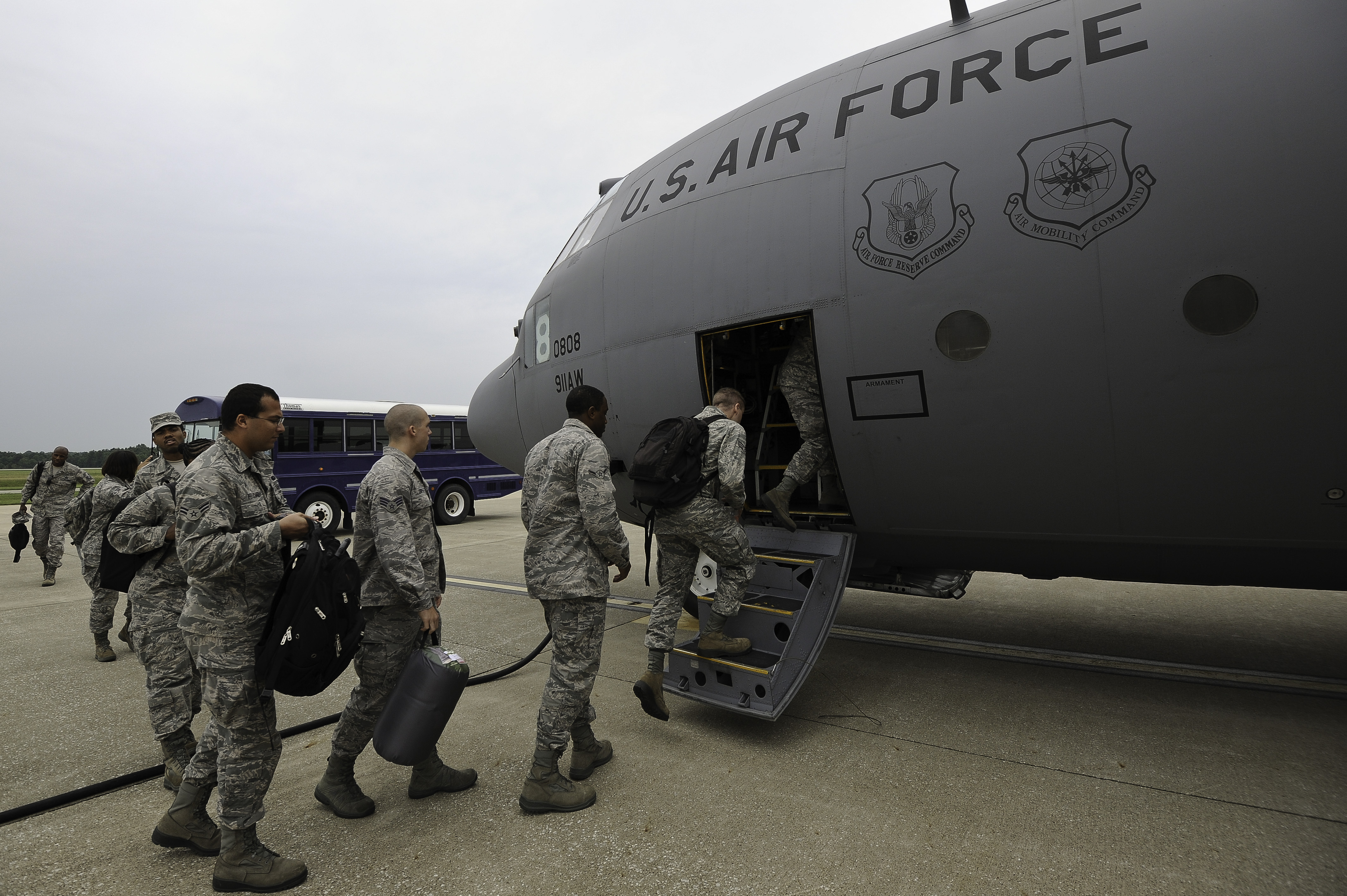
- Airmen of the 910th Airlift Wing board a C-130 Hercules of the 758th Airlift Squadron to participate in Exercise Global Medic
- Active: 1943–1945; 1947–1949; 1957–present
- Country: United States
- Branch: United States Air Force
- Role: Airlift
- Part of: Air Force Reserve Command
- Garrison/HQ: Pittsburgh International Airport
- Engagements: Mediterranean Theater of Operations; European Theater of Operations
- Decorations: Distinguished Unit Citation; Air Force Outstanding Unit Award; Republic of Vietnam Gallantry Cross with Palm

Insignia
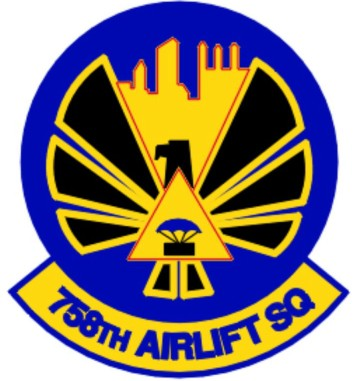
- 758th Airlift Squadron emblem (Note: Approved 1 October 1990.)

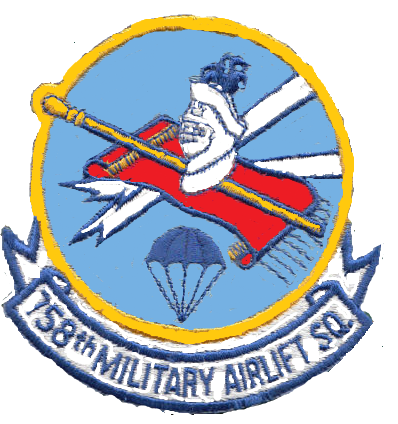
- Patch with 758th Troop Carrier Squadron emblem (Note: Approved 20 August 1960. Description: On a sky blue disc bordered Air Force golden yellow, two white lightning flashes saltirewise throughout issuing from sinister chief above an Air Force blue parachute highlighted sky blue; surmounting the flashes a red flying carpet bendwise, fringed Air Force golden yellow leaving speed lines Air Force golden yellow to sinister; over all an Air Force golden yellow spear bendwise its head extending beyond the border in dexter its shaft surmounted by a white helmet shaded sky blue, plumed Air Force blue; outlines and details Air Force blue throughout.)

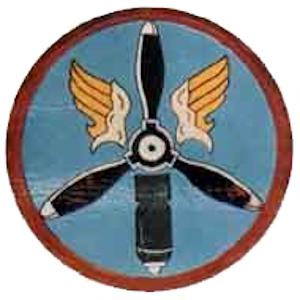
- Patch with 758th Bombardment Squadron emblem

The 758th Airlift Squadron is part of the 911th Airlift Wing at Pittsburgh International Airport, Pennsylvania. It operates the Boeing C-17 Globemaster III aircraft, providing global strategic airlift.

The squadron was first activated during World War II as the 758th Bombardment Squadron. After training in the United States, it deployed to the Mediterranean Theater of Operations, where it participated in the strategic bombing campaign against Germany, and it earned a Distinguished Unit Citation for its actions. Following V-E Day, the squadron returned to the United States and was inactivated.

In 1947, the squadron was reactivated in the reserves, but does not appear to have been fully manned or equipped before inactivating in June 1949. The squadron was redesignated the 758th Troop Carrier Squadron and again activated at Pittsburgh Airport in the reserve in 1957. It has served as an airlift unit there ever since.

== Mission ==
To organize, recruit, and train Air Force reserve personnel to provide airlift of airborne forces, their equipment and supplies, and delivery of these forces and materials by airdrop, landing, or cargo extraction systems.

== History ==
=== World War II ===
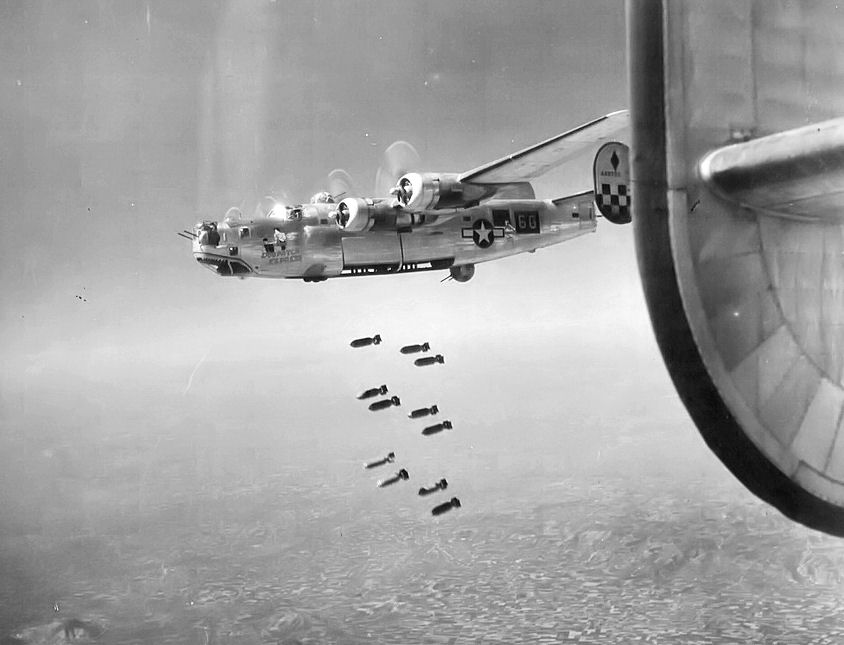
459th Bombardment Group B-24 Liberator attacking a target (Note: Aircraft is Ford Motors built Consolidated B-24L-10-FO Liberator, serial 44-49750. This plane returned to the United States after the war and was scrapped at Kingman Army Air Field on 16 November 1945. Baugher, Joe (10 June 2023). "1944 USAF Serial Numbers". Joe Baugher. Photo taken while bombing near Padua, Italy on 4 May 1945.)

The squadron was first activated as the 758th Bombardment Squadron at Alamogordo Army Air Field, New Mexico on 1 July 1943 as one of the original squadrons of the 459th Bombardment Group. It was equipped with Consolidated B-24 Liberator heavy bombers and trained at Davis-Monthan Field, Arizona. The squadron received deployment orders for the Mediterranean Theater of Operations in September 1943, but was diverted to fly long-range convoy escort missions over the Newfoundland Banks to Long Island Sound, November–December 1943 while its station in Italy was being constructed.

The squadron deployed to Southern Italy in January 1944 and entered combat in March as part of Fifteenth Air Force's strategic bombing campaign. The squadron attacked enemy military, industrial and transportation targets in Italy, France, Germany, Poland, Czechoslovakia, Austria, Hungary, Romania, Bulgaria, Greece and Yugoslavia, bombing railroad marshalling yards, oil refineries, airfields, concentration centers and other strategic objectives. The squadron earned a Distinguished Unit Citation when the 459th Group led the 304th Bombardment Wing on a raid against an aircraft plant at Bad Vöslau. The group pressed its attack despite opposition by enemy interceptors and intense flak.

The squadron was occasionally diverted from the strategic bombing campaign to carry out support and interdiction operations. It struck railroads during March 1944 to support Operation Shingle, the landings at Anzio. It struck bridges, harbors, and troop concentrations in August 1944 in the preinvasion phase of Operation Dragoon, th invasion of southern France. It also hit communications lines and other targets during March and April 1945 to support the advance of British Eighth Army and American Fifth Army in northern Italy.

Following VE Day, the squadron returned to the United States in August 1945. The squadron was programmed for deployment to the Pacific Theater of Operations as a Boeing B-29 Superfortress very heavy bombardment squadron and reassembled at Sioux Falls Army Air Field, South Dakota at the end of August. However, Japan surrendered shortly after the squadron's arrival and it was inactivated on 28 August 1945.

=== Reserve training ===
The squadron was reactivated as a reserve unit at Long Beach Army Air Field, California in July 1947. Although nominally a very heavy bomber squadron, it operated a variety of trainer aircraft to maintain proficiency under Air Defense Command's 416th AAF Base Unit (later the 2347th Air Force Reserve Training Center). President Truman's reduced 1949 defense budget required reductions in the number of units in the Air Force, In addition, Continental Air Command, which had assumed responsibility for reserve training in 1948, reorganized its reserve units under the wing base organization system in 1949. This resulted in the squadron's parent 459th Group being reduced to a single operational squadron, and the 758th was inactivated on 27 June 1949.

=== Reactivation as a reserve airlift unit ===
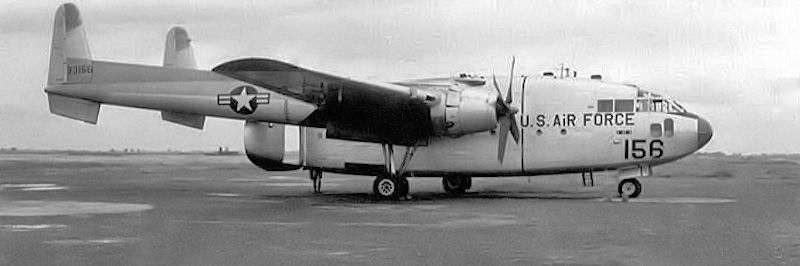
Fairchild C-119G Flying Boxcar

During the first half of 1955, the Air Force began detaching Air Force reserve squadrons from their parent wing locations to separate sites. Communities were more likely to accept the smaller squadrons than the large wings and the location of separate squadrons in smaller population centers would facilitate recruiting and manning.s The 459th Wing, located at Andrews Air Force Base, Maryland activated the 758th, now the 758th Troop Carrier Squadron, in 1957 as its third flying squadron at Greater Pittsburgh Airport, Pennsylvania. In April 1959, the wing reorganized under the Dual Deputy system. Its 459th Troop Carrier Group was inactivated and the 756th, 757th and 758th Troop Carrier Squadrons were assigned directly to the wing.

=== Activation of groups under the wing ===
Although the dispersal of flying units was not a problem when the entire wing was called to active service, mobilizing a single flying squadron and elements to support it proved difficult. This weakness was demonstrated in the partial mobilization of reserve units during the Berlin Crisis of 1961 To resolve this, at the start of 1962, Continental Air Command determined to reorganize its reserve wings by establishing groups with support elements for each of its troop carrier squadrons. This reorganization would facilitate mobilization of elements of wings in various combinations when needed. However, as this plan was entering its implementation phase, another partial mobilization occurred for the Cuban Missile Crisis. The formation of troop carrier groups was delayed until January for wings that had not been mobilized. The squadron was assigned to the new 911th Troop Carrier Group on 17 January.

== Lineage ==
- Constituted as the 758th Bombardment Squadron (Heavy) on 19 May 1943

Activated on 1 July 1943
Redesignated 758th Bombardment Squadron, Heavy c. Sep 1944
Inactivated on 28 August 1945

- Redesignated 758th Bombardment Squadron, Very Heavy on 13 May 1947

Activated in the reserve on 12 July 1947

- Inactivated on 27 June 1949
- Redesignated 758th Troop Carrier Squadron, Medium on 24 October 1957

Activated in the reserve on 16 November 1957
Redesignated 758th Military Airlift Squadron on 1 January 1967
Redesignated 758th Tactical Airlift Squadron on 1 March 1972
Redesignated 758th Airlift Squadron on 1 February 1992

=== Assignments ===
- 459th Bombardment Group, 1 July 1943 – 28 August 1945
- 459th Troop Carrier Group, 12 July 1947 – 27 June 1949
- 459th Troop Carrier Group, 16 November 1957
- 459th Troop Carrier Wing, 14 April 1959
- 911th Troop Carrier Group (later 911th Military Airlift Group, 911th Tactical Airlift Group, 911th Airlift Group), 17 January 1963
- 911th Operations Group, 1 August 1992 – present

=== Stations ===
- Alamogordo Army Air Field, New Mexico, 1 July 1943
- Kearns Army Air Base, Utah, 2 September 1943
- Davis-Monthan Field, Arizona, 22 September 1943
- Westover Field, Massachusetts, 1 November 1943 – 2 January 1944
- Giulia Airfield, Italy, 12 February 1944 – c. 2 August 1945
- Sioux Falls Army Air Field, South Dakota, c. 14–28 August 1945
- Long Beach Army Air Field (later Long Beach Air Force Field, Long Beach Airport), California, 12 July 1947 – 27 June 1949
- Pittsburgh International Airport, Pennsylvania, 16 November 1957 – present

=== Aircraft ===
- Consolidated B-24 Liberator (1943–1945)
- North American T-6 Texan (1947–1949)
- Beechcraft T-7 Navigator (1947–1949)
- Beechcraft T-11 Kansan (1947–1949)
- Fairchild C-119 Flying Boxcar (1957–1967)
- Douglas C-124 Globemaster II (1966–1972)
- Fairchild C-123 Provider (1972–1980)
- Lockheed C-130 Hercules (1980–2018)
- Boeing C-17 Globemaster III (beginning in 2019)

|}

=== Awards and campaigns ===
Award streamer	Award	Dates	Notes
	Distinguished Unit Citation	23 April 1944 Bad Vöslau, Austria	758th Bombardment Squadron
	Air Force Outstanding Unit Award	1 January 1977-31 December 1978	757th Tactical Airlift Squadron
	Air Force Outstanding Unit Award	1 August 1987-31 July 1989	757th Airlift Squadron
	Air Force Outstanding Unit Award	15 September 1990-14 September 1992	757th Airlift Squadron
	Republic of Vietnam Gallantry Cross with Palm	1 January 1968-29 February 1972	757th Tactical Airlift Squadron

Campaign Streamer	Campaign	Dates	Notes
	Air Offensive, Europe	12 February 1944 – 5 June 1944	758th Bombardment Squadron
	Air Combat, EAME Theater	12 February 1944 – 11 May 1945	758th Bombardment Squadron
	Rome-Arno	12 February 1944 – 9 September 1944	758th Bombardment Squadron
	Central Europe	22 March 1944 – 21 May 1945	758th Bombardment Squadron
	Normandy	6 June 1944 – 24 July 1944	758th Bombardment Squadron
	Northern France	25 July 1944 – 14 September 1944	758th Bombardment Squadron
	Southern France	15 August 1944 – 14 September 1944	758th Bombardment Squadron
	North Apennines	10 September 1944 – 4 April 1945	758th Bombardment Squadron
	Rhineland	15 September 1944 – 21 March 1945	758th Bombardment Squadron
	Po Valley	3 April 1945 – 8 May 1945	758th Bombardment Squadron

== See also ==
- B-24 Liberator units of the United States Army Air Forces
- List of C-130 Hercules operators
