= 759th Bombardment Squadron =

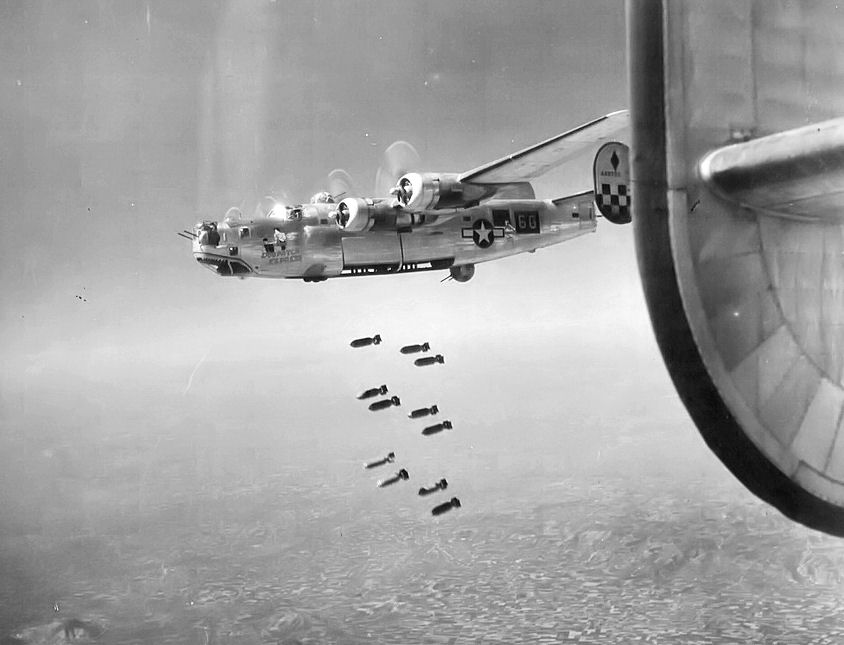
- 459th Bombardment Group B-24 Liberator attacking a target (Note: Aircraft is Ford Motors built Consolidated B-24L-10-FO Liberator, serial 44-49750. This plane returned to the United States after the war and was scrapped at Kingman Army Air Field on 16 November 1945. Baugher, Joe (10 June 2023). "1944 USAF Serial Numbers". Joe Baugher. Photo taken while bombing near Padua, Italy on 4 May 1945.)
- Active: 1943–1945; 1947–1951
- Country: United States
- Branch: United States Air Force
- Role: Bombardment
- Engagements: Mediterranean Theater of Operations
- Decorations: Distinguished Unit Citation

Insignia
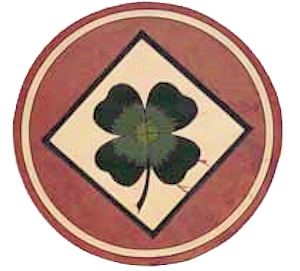
- 759th Airlift Squadron emblem (Note: Approved 31 July 1944. Description: On a medium brown disc, border evenly divided white and brown, a white diamond edged blue green charged with a blue green four-leaf clover.)

The 759th Bombardment Squadron is an inactive United States Air Force unit. The squadron was organized in July 1943 as a Consolidated B-24 Liberator unit. After training in the United States, it moved to Italy, where it engaged in the strategic bombing campaign against the Axis, earning a Distinguished Unit Citation for an attack on an aircraft factory in Austria. it was inactivated after returning to the United States.

The squadron was activated in the reserve at Davis-Monthan Field, Arizona in 1947, although it is not clear if it was equipped before 1949. At that time it became a corollary of the 43d Bombardment Group, a Strategic Air Command unit flying Boeing B-29 Superfortresses. It was mobilized for the Korean War in May 1951. After its personnel were transferred to other units, it was inactivated on 16 June 1951.

== History ==
=== World War II ===
The squadron was first activated on 1 July 1943 at Alamogordo Army Air Field, New Mexico as the 759th Bombardment Squadron, one of the four original squadrons of the 459th Bombardment Group. The squadron trained with Consolidated B-24 Liberators under Second Air Force Until October, when it moved to Westover Field, Massachusetts. The squadron flew long-range convoy escort missions over area between the Newfoundland Banks and Long Island Sound in November and December 1943 while Giulia Airfield, its station in Italy, was being constructed. In January 1944, the squadron began its overseas movement.

The squadron arrived in Italy in February 1944 and began flying combat missions in March. The squadron engaged in very long range strategic bombing missions to enemy military, industrial and transportation targets in Italy, France, Germany, Austria, Hungary, Romania, and Yugoslavia, bombing railroad marshalling yards, oil refineries, airfields, heavy industry, and other strategic objectives. In April 1944, the 459th Group led the 304th Bombardment Wing in an attack on an airfield and aircraft factory at Bad Vöslau, Austria through heavy flak and fighter attacks. The squadron was awarded a Distinguished Unit Citation for this action.

In addition to strategic missions, the squadron also carried out support and interdiction operations. In March 1944, the squadron attacked railroads used to supply enemy forces surrounding the Anzio beachhead. In August, it struck bridges, harbors, and troop concentrations to aid Operation Dragoon, the invasion of Southern France. It also hit communications lines and other targets during March and April 1945 to support the advance of British Eighth Army and American Fifth Army in northern Italy.

The squadron returned to the United States in August 1945, being programmed for deployment to the Pacific Theater as a Boeing B-29 Superfortress very heavy bombardment squadron. A cadre reformed at Sioux Falls Army Air Field, South Dakota in the middle of the month. The Japanese surrender in August led to the inactivation of unit on 28 August.

=== Reserve operations ===
The 759th was activated as a reserve unit at Davis-Monthan Field, Arizona in April 1947, although its parent 459th Group was located at Long Beach Army Air Field, California. Although nominally a heavy bomber unit, it is not clear whether the squadron was equipped with operational aircraft prior to 1949. The rest of the 459th Group at Long Beach trained with North American T-6 Texans and Beechcraft T-7 Navigators and T-11 Kansans The squadron trained under the supervision of the 419th AAF Base Unit (later the 2348th Air Force Reserve Flying Training Center).

President Truman’s reduced 1949 defense budget required reductions in the number of units in the Air Force. ConAC also reorganized its reserve units under the wing base organization system in June 1949, making the 459th Group and its squadrons at Long Beach surplus. However, the May 1949 Air Force Reserve program called for a new type of unit, the corollary unit, which was a reserve unit integrated with an active duty unit. The plan called for corollary units at 107 locations. It was viewed as the best method to train reservists by mixing them with an existing regular unit to perform duties alongside the regular unit. The 459th Group headquarters moved without personnel or equipment to Davis-Monthan and the group and squadron became corollaries of Strategic Air Command (SAC)'s 43d Bombardment Group, a B-29 unit. Along with all other reserve corollary units, the group was mobilized for the Korean War. Once the squadron was mobilized in May 1951 SAC reassigned its personnel to other units and the unit inactivated the following month.

== Lineage ==
- Constituted as the 759 Bombardment Squadron (Heavy) on 19 May 1943

Activated on 1 July 1943

- Redesignated 759 Bombardment Squadron, Heavy on 29 September 1944

Inactivated on 28 August 1945

- Redesignated 759 Bombardment Squadron, Very Heavy on 11 March 1947

Activated in the reserve on 19 April 1947
Redesignated 759 Bombardment Squadron, Medium on 26 June 1949
Ordered to active service on 1 May 1951
Inactivated on 16 June 1951

=== Assignments ===
- 459th Bombardment Group, 1 July 1943 – 28 August 1945
- 459th Bombardment Group, 19 April 1947 – 16 June 1951

=== Stations ===
- Alamogordo Army Air Field, New Mexico, 1 July 1943
- Kearns Army Air Base, Utah, 2 September 1943
- Davis-Monthan Field, Arizona, 22 September 1943
- Westover Field, Massachusetts, 1 November 1943 – 2 January 1944
- Giulia Airfield, Italy, 12 February 1944 – c. 2 August 1945
- Sioux Falls Army Air Field, South Dakota, c. 14–28 August 1945
- Davis-Monthan Field (later Davis-Monthan Air Force Base), Arizona, 12 July 1947 – 16 June 1951

=== Aircraft ===
- B-24 Liberator, 1943-1945

=== Awards and campaigns ===
Award streamer	Award	Dates	Notes
	Distinguished Unit Citation	23 April 1944	Bad Vöslau, Austria 759th Bombardment Squadron

Campaign Streamer	Campaign	Dates	Notes
	Air Offensive, Europe	12 February 1944 – 5 June 1944	759th Bombardment Squadron
	Air Combat, EAME Theater	12 February 1944 – 11 May 1945	759th Bombardment Squadron
	Rome-Arno	12 February 1944 – 9 September 1944	759th Bombardment Squadron
	Central Europe	22 March 1944 – 21 May 1945	759th Bombardment Squadron
	Normandy	6 June 1944 – 24 July 1944	759th Bombardment Squadron
	Northern France	25 July 1944 – 14 September 1944	759th Bombardment Squadron
	Southern France	15 August 1944 – 14 September 1944	759th Bombardment Squadron
	North Apennines	10 September 1944 – 4 April 1945	759th Bombardment Squadron
	Rhineland	15 September 1944 – 21 March 1945	759th Bombardment Squadron
	Po Valley	3 April 1945 – 8 May 1945	759th Bombardment Squadron

== See also ==
- B-24 Liberator units of the United States Army Air Forces
