= 757th Airlift Squadron =

757th Airlift Squadron

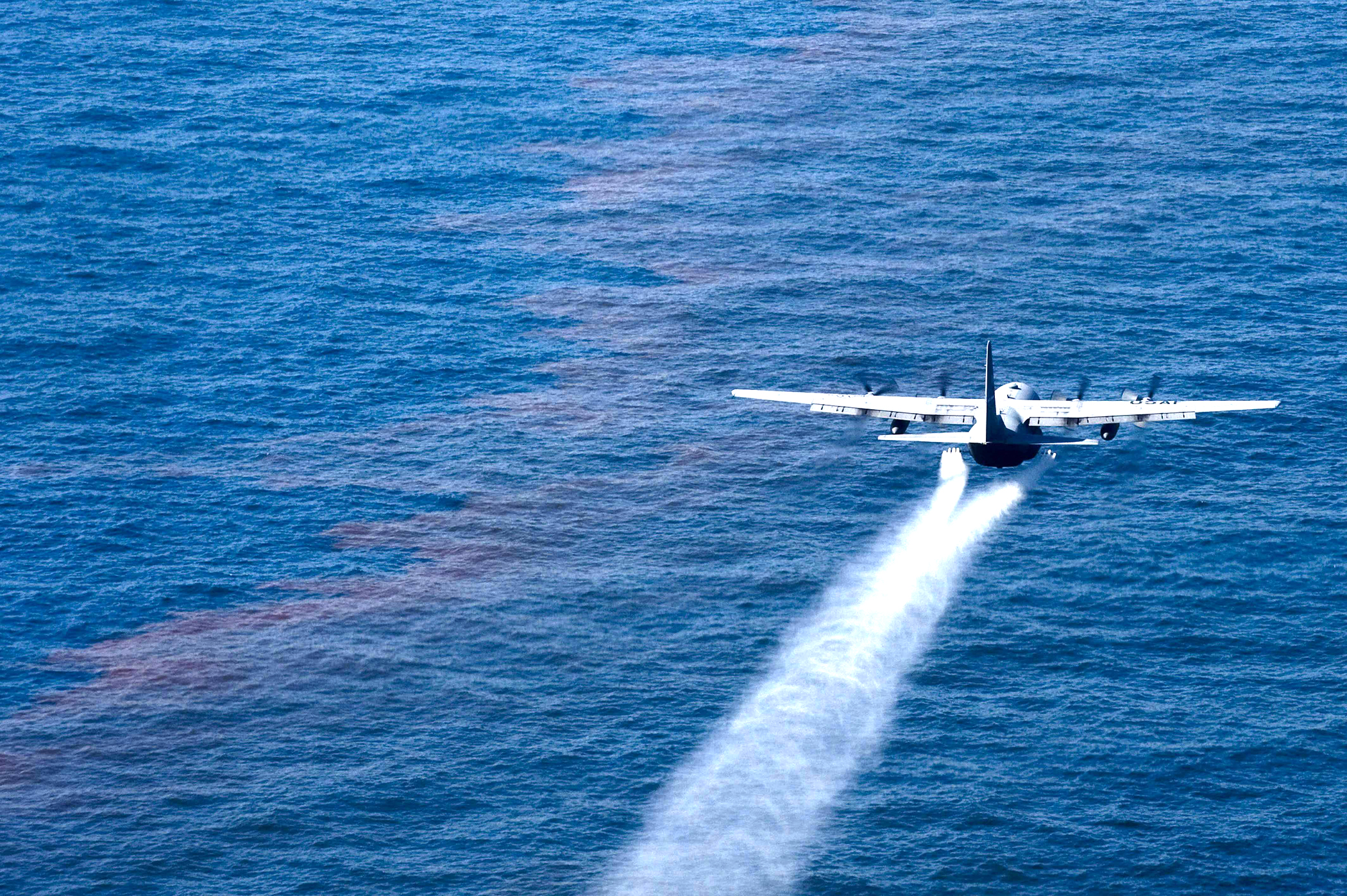
- A squadron C-130 Hercules drops an oil-dispersing chemical into the Gulf of Mexico as part of the Deepwater Horizon response effort.
- Active: 1943–1945; 1947–1949; 1955–present
- Country: United States
- Branch: United States Air Force
- Role: Airlift, Aerial spray operations
- Part of: Air Force Reserve Command
- Garrison/HQ: Youngstown Air Reserve Station, Ohio
- Nickname: Thunderbirds (World War II) Blue Tigers
- Engagements: Mediterranean Theater of Operations
- Decorations: Distinguished Unit Citation; Air Force Outstanding Unit Award; Republic of Vietnam Gallantry Cross with Palm

Insignia
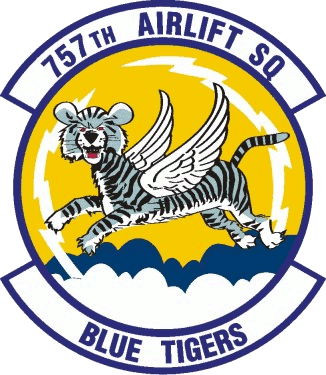
- 757th Airlift Squadron emblem (Note: Modified c. 1995.)

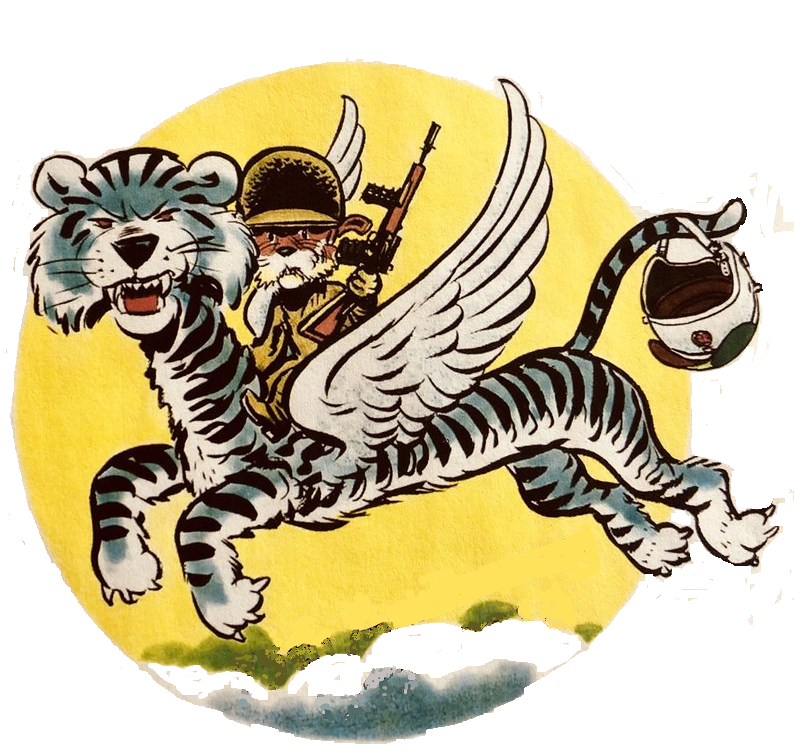
- 757th Troop Carrier Squadron emblem (Note: Approved 21 February 1961. Description: On and over an Air Force golden yellow disc, a light blue, white, and green cloud formation issuing form base, a caricatured winged tiger in flight, sky blue, face, paws, and stomach white, eyes and tongue red, stripes black, carrying on his back a dog-faced character, face brown, whiskers of muzzle white, in full battle kit, olive green, carrying in his left hand an automatic weapon brown, suspended from the tiger's tail a white jet helmet, lined brown and green with a red cross insignia and green goggles.)

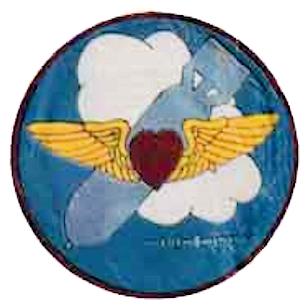
- 757th Bombardment Squadron emblem

The 757th Airlift Squadron is an Air Force reserve unit, part of the 910th Airlift Wing stationed at Youngstown Air Reserve Station (YARS), Ohio. It flies C-130H Hercules aircraft on airlift and aerial spray missions.

The squadron was first activated in 1943 as the 757th Bombardment Squadron. It flew Consolidated B-24 Liberators in the Mediterranean Theater of Operations, primarily on strategic bombing missions, but also flew air support and interdiction missions, earning a Distinguished Unit Citation for attacking an aircraft plant in Austria despite heavy flak and fighter opposition. It was inactivated following V-J Day, but was reactivated in the reserve from 1947 through 1949, flying various trainer aircraft but was inactivated before becoming operational.

The squadron was again activated in the reserve in 1955 as the 757th Troop Carrier Squadron and trained as an airlift squadron with Curtiss C-46 Commando and Fairchild C-119 Flying Boxcar aircraft until 1970, and returned to the airlift mission in 1991. From 1970 until 1991, it served as a forward air control and tactical fighter unit.

== Mission ==
The mission of the 757th Airlift Squadron is to maintain a large-area fixed-wing aerial application capability to control disease vectors in combat areas and on Department of Defense installations; to maintain a large-area application capability to control vegetation and pests of vegetation on DoD installations; and to conduct aerial spray training.

The 757th operates eight Lockheed C-130 HerculesH2 aircraft, four of which are modified to accept the Modular Aerial Spray System, with a capacity of 2,000 US gallons (7,600 L); which can be delivered at a flow rate of 232 US gallons (880 L) per minute, at an altitude of 100 feet (30 m) for a total spray time of 8 minutes and 30 seconds.

== History ==
=== World War II ===
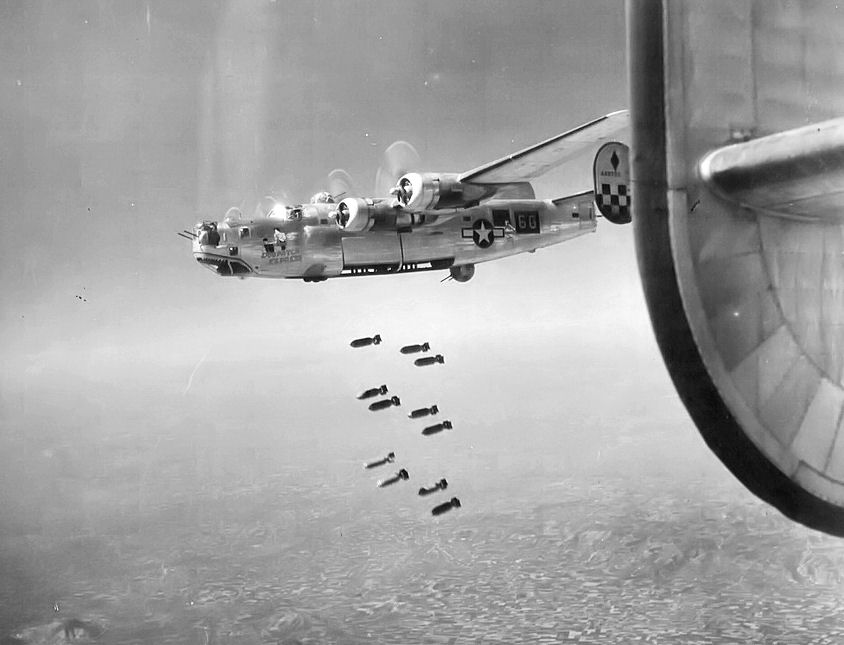
459th Bombardment Group B-24 Liberator attacking a target (Note: Aircraft is Ford Motors built Consolidated B-24L-10-FO Liberator, serial 44-49750. This plane returned to the United States after the war and was scrapped at Kingman Army Air Field on 16 November 1945. Baugher, Joe (10 June 2023). "1944 USAF Serial Numbers". Joe Baugher. Photo taken while bombing near Padua, Italy on 4 May 1945.)

The squadron was first activated on 1 July 1943 at Alamogordo Army Air Field, New Mexico as the 757th Bombardment Squadron, one of the four original squadrons of the 459th Bombardment Group. The squadron trained with Consolidated B-24 Liberators under Second Air Force Until October, when it moved to Westover Field, Massachusetts. The squadron flew long-range convoy escort missions over area between the Newfoundland Banks and Long Island Sound in November and December 1943 while Giulia Airfield, its station in Italy, was being constructed. In January 1944, the squadron began its overseas movement.

The squadron arrived in Italy in February 1944 and began flying combat missions in March. The squadron engaged in very long range strategic bombing missions to enemy military, industrial and transportation targets in Italy, France, Germany, Austria, Hungary, Romania, and Yugoslavia, bombing railroad marshalling yards, oil refineries, airfields, heavy industry, and other strategic objectives. In April 1944, the 459th Group led the 304th Bombardment Wing in an attack on an airfield and aircraft factory at Bad Vöslau, Austria through heavy flak and fighter attacks. The squadron was awarded a Distinguished Unit Citation for this action.

In addition to strategic missions, the squadron also carried out support and interdiction operations. In March 1944, the squadron attacked railroads used to supply enemy forces surrounding the Anzio beachhead. In August, it struck bridges, harbors, and troop concentrations to aid Operation Dragoon, the invasion of Southern France. It also hit communications lines and other targets during March and April 1945 to support the advance of British Eighth Army and American Fifth Army in northern Italy.

The squadron returned to the United States in August 1945, being programmed for deployment to the Pacific Theater as a Boeing B-29 Superfortress very heavy bombardment squadron. A cadre reformed at Sioux Falls Army Air Field, South Dakota in the middle of the month. The Japanese surrender in August led to the inactivation of unit on 28 August.

=== Early reserve operations ===
The 757th was reactivated as a reserve unit at Long Beach Army Air Field, California in July 1947. Although nominally a heavy bomber unit, the squadron trained with North American T-6 Texans and Beechcraft T-7 Navigators and T-11 Kansans under the supervision of the 416th AAF Base Unit (later the 2347th Air Force Reserve Flying Training Center) of Air Defense Command (ADC). In July 1948, Continental Air Command (ConAC) assumed responsibility for managing reserve and Air National Guard units from ADC. The 757th was inactivated when President Truman's reduced 1949 defense budget required reductions in the number of units in the Air Force. ConAC also reorganized its reserve units under the wing base organization system in June 1949, making the squadron surplus. The squadron's personnel and equipment were transferred to other reserve units at Long Beach.

=== Reserve airlift operations ===
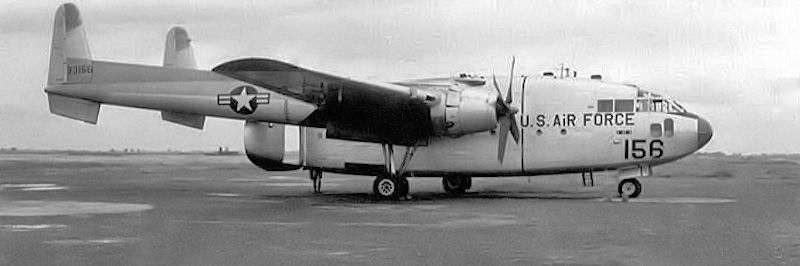
Fairchild C-119G Flying Boxcar

In January 1955, the 757th's parent was reactivated at Andrews Air Force Base, Maryland as the 459th Troop Carrier Group. During the first half of 1955, the Air Force began detaching Air Force reserve squadrons from their parent wing locations to separate sites. The concept offered several advantages: communities were more likely to accept the smaller squadrons than the large wings and the location of separate squadrons in smaller population centers would facilitate recruiting and manning. As it finally evolved in the spring of 1955, the ConAC plan called for placing Air Force reserve units at fifty-nine installations located throughout the United States. As one of the first three squadrons involved in the program, the squadron was activated at Byrd Field, Virginia as the 757th Troop Carrier Squadron. At Byrd Field, the squadron began training with the Curtiss C-46 Commando. In the summer of 1956, the squadron participated in Operation Sixteen Ton during its two weeks of active duty training. Sixteen Ton was performed entirely by reserve troop carrier units and moved United States Coast Guard equipment From Floyd Bennett Naval Air Station to Isla Grande Airport in Puerto Rico and San Salvador in the Bahamas. After the success of Operation Sixteen Ton, the squadron began to use inactive duty training periods for Operation Swift Lift, transporting high priority cargo for the air force and Operation Ready Swap, transporting aircraft engines, between Air Materiel Command’s depots.

Shortly thereafter, The Joint Chiefs of Staff were pressuring the Air Force to provide more wartime airlift. At the same time, about 150 Fairchild C-119 Flying Boxcars became available from the active force. Consequently, in November 1956 the Air Force directed ConAC to convert three reserve fighter bomber wings to the troop carrier mission by September 1957. In addition, within the Air Staff was a recommendation that the reserve fighter mission given to the Air National Guard and replaced by the troop carrier mission. Cuts in the budget in 1957 also led to a reduction in the number of reserve squadrons from 55 to 45, including troop carrier units. As a result of these actions, reserve troop carrier operations at Byrd Field ended, and the squadron moved on paper to Youngstown Municipal Airport, Ohio, where it replaced the 26th Fighter-Bomber Squadron, which was simultaneously inactivated. At Youngstown, the unit began conversion to the Flying Boxcar.

At Youngstown, the squadron trained with the 2234th Air Reserve Flying Center, but one month after its arrival there, the center was inactivated and some of its personnel were absorbed by the squadron. In place of active duty support for reserve units, ConAC adopted the Air Reserve Technician Program, in which a cadre of the unit consisted of full-time personnel who were simultaneously civilian employees of the Air Force and held rank as members of the reserves. Another reorganization affected the unit in April 1959, when reserve units adopted the dual deputy organization. Under this plan, the 459th Troop Carrier Group was inactivated and the squadron reported directly to the 459th Troop Carrier Wing. All support organizations were located with the wing headquarters at Andrews.

Although the dispersal of flying units under the Detached Squadron Concept was not a problem when the entire wing was called to active service, mobilizing a single flying squadron and elements to support it proved difficult. This weakness was demonstrated in the partial mobilization of reserve units during the Berlin Crisis of 1961. To resolve this, ConAC determined to reorganize its reserve wings by establishing groups with support elements for each of its troop carrier squadrons at the start of 1962. This reorganization would facilitate mobilization of elements of wings in various combinations when needed. However, as this plan was entering its implementation phase, another partial mobilization occurred for the Cuban Missile Crisis, with the units being released on 22 November 1962. The formation of troop carrier groups was delayed until January 1963 for wings that had not been mobilized. At that time, the squadron was assigned to the 910th Troop Carrier Group, which was activated as the command element for the squadron at Youngstown, along with support elements for the 757th. The squadron continued airlift operations with the C-119 until 1969, although its name changed to the 757th Tactical Airlift Squadron in July 1967.

=== Later reserve operations ===
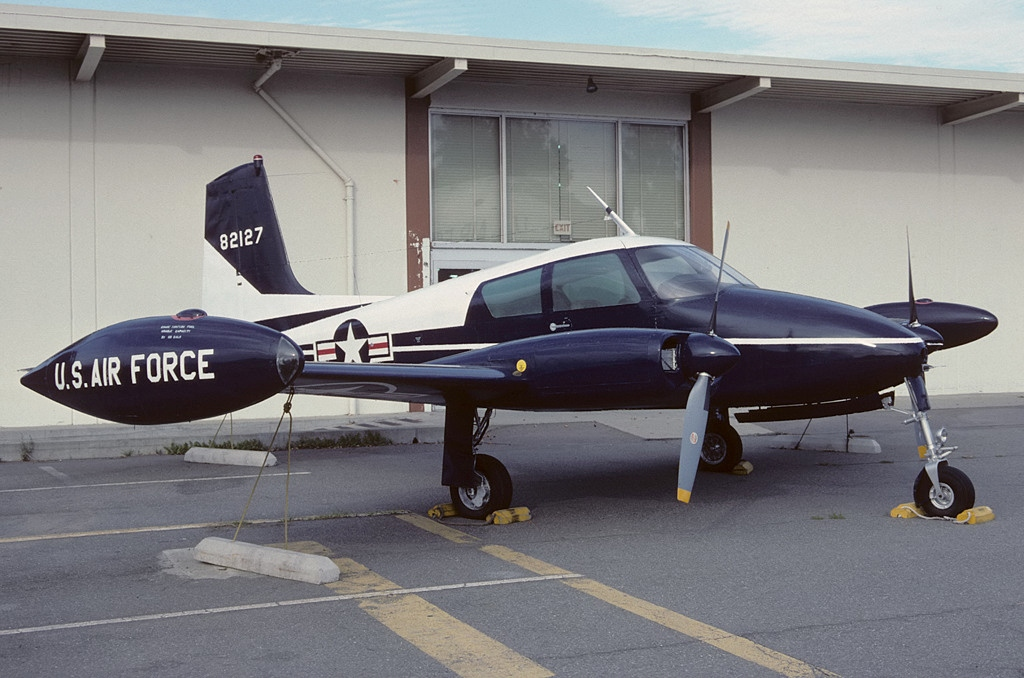
Cessna U-3A Blue Canoe

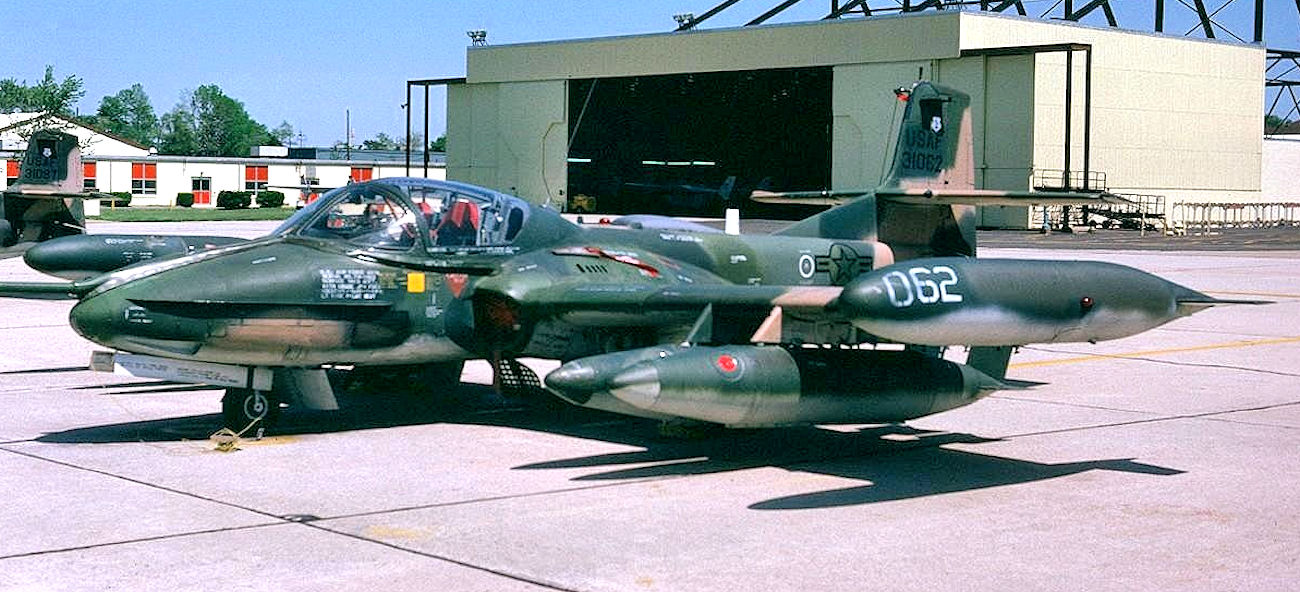
Cessna A-37B Dragonfly

In 1969, the C-119 was leaving the Air Force airlift inventory, although it served in special operations, and the squadron began converting to the Cessna U-3 Blue Canoe. Although this plane was as ill-suited to the forward air control mission as it was to the airlift mission, in January 1970, the squadron became the 757th Tactical Air Control Squadron in January 1970. The squadron's time with the U-3 was short, for it began operating the Cessna A-37 Dragonfly the following year, first as the 757th Special Operations Squadron, and then as the 757th Tactical Fighter Squadron. it would operate the Dragonfly for the next ten years.

=== Return to airlift mission, aerial spray mission ===
In 1981, the squadron again became the 757th Tactical Airlift Squadron as it began its current association with the Lockheed C-130 Hercules.

In February 1992, the squadron was redesignated the 757th Airlift Squadron and added the aerial spray mission with special equipment mounted in the cargo compartment of its C-130s.

In 2005, the squadron flew missions over Louisiana and Texas in the aftermath of Hurricane Katrina, spraying 2.9 million acres (12,000 km^{2}) to combat mosquitoes and filth flies.

In May 2010, the 757th deployed to the Gulf of Mexico in response to the Deepwater Horizon oil spill. The squadron utilized their aircraft's Modular Aerial Spray System (MASS) in order to spray a dispersing agent to break up the oil slick on the water.

In 2022, members of the squadron deployed among other 910th Airlift Wing personnel to staff the 75th Expeditionary Airlift Squadron (75th EAS) at Camp Lemonnier, Djibouti. The 75th EAS is a deployed unit, made up of rotating Air Force Reserve Command and Air National Guard units.

== Lineage ==
- Constituted as the 757th Bombardment Squadron (Heavy) on 19 May 1943

Activated on 1 July 1943
Redesignated 757th Bombardment Squadron, Heavy on 29 September 1944
Inactivated on 28 August 1945

- Redesignated 757th Bombardment Squadron, Very Heavy on 13 March 1947

Activated in the reserve on 12 July 1947
Inactivated on 27 June 1949

- Redesignated 757th Troop Carrier Squadron, Medium on 11 March 1955

Activated in the reserve on 8 April 1955
Redesignated 757th Tactical Airlift Squadron on 1 July 1967
Redesignated 757th Tactical Air Support Squadron on 25 January 1970
Redesignated 757th Special Operations Squadron on 29 June 1971
Redesignated 757th Tactical Fighter Squadron on 1 October 1973
Redesignated 757th Tactical Airlift Squadron on 1 July 1981
Redesignated 757th Airlift Squadron on 1 February 1992

=== Assignments ===
- 459th Bombardment Group, 1 July 1943 – 28 August 1945
- 459th Bombardment Group, 12 July 1947 – 27 June 1949
- 459th Troop Carrier Group, 8 April 1955
- 459th Troop Carrier Wing, 14 April 1959
- 910th Troop Carrier Group (later 910th Tactical Airlift Group, 910th Tactical Air Support Group, 910th Special Operations Group, 910th Tactical Fighter Group, 910th Tactical Airlift Group, 910th Airlift) Group, 17 January 1963
- 910th Operations Group, 1 August 1992 – present

=== Stations ===
- Alamogordo Army Air Field, New Mexico, 1 July 1943
- Kearns Army Air Base, Utah, 2 September 1943
- Davis-Monthan Field, Arizona, 22 September 1943
- Westover Field, Massachusetts, 1 November 1943 – 2 January 1944
- Giulia Airfield, Italy, 12 February 1944 – c. 2 August 1945
- Sioux Falls Army Air Field, South Dakota, c. 14–28 August 1945
- Long Beach Army Air Field (later Long Beach Airport), California, 19 April 1947 – 27 June 1949
- Byrd Field, Virginia, 8 April 1955
- Youngstown Municipal Airport (later Youngstown Municipal Airport Air Reserve Station; Youngstown-Warren Regional Airport Air Reserve Station), Ohio, 16 November 1957 – present

=== Aircraft ===
- Consolidated B-24 Liberator, 1943–1945
- North American T-6 Texan, 1947-1949
- Beechcraft T-7 Navigator, 1947-1949
- Beechcraft T-11 Kansan, 1947-1949
- Beechcraft C-45 Expeditor, 1955–c. 1958
- Curtiss C-46 Commando, 1955–1957
- Fairchild C-119 Flying Boxcar, 1957–1969
- Cessna U-3 Blue Canoe, 1969-1971
- Cessna A-37 Dragonfly, 1971–1981
- Lockheed C-130 Hercules, 1981–present

=== Awards and campaigns ===
Award streamer	Award	Dates	Notes
	Distinguished Unit Citation	23 April 1944 Bad Vöslau, Austria	757th Bombardment Squadron
	Air Force Outstanding Unit Award	1 September 1983-31 August 1985	757th Tactical Airlift Squadron
	Air Force Outstanding Unit Award	1 September 1995-31 August 1997	757th Airlift Squadron
	Air Force Outstanding Unit Award	1 September 2003-31 August 2005	757th Airlift Squadron
	Air Force Outstanding Unit Award	8 September 2005-18 October 2005	757th Airlift Squadron
	Republic of Vietnam Gallantry Cross with Palm	14 February 1968-11 March 1968	757th Tactical Airlift Squadron
	Republic of Vietnam Gallantry Cross with Palm	26 October 1972-28 October 1972	757th Tactical Airlift Squadron

Campaign Streamer	Campaign	Dates	Notes
	Air Offensive, Europe	12 February 1944 – 5 June 1944	757th Bombardment Squadron
	Air Combat, EAME Theater	12 February 1944 – 11 May 1945	757th Bombardment Squadron
	Rome-Arno	12 February 1944 – 9 September 1944	757th Bombardment Squadron
	Central Europe	22 March 1944 – 21 May 1945	757th Bombardment Squadron
	Normandy	6 June 1944 – 24 July 1944	757th Bombardment Squadron
	Northern France	25 July 1944 – 14 September 1944	757th Bombardment Squadron
	Southern France	15 August 1944 – 14 September 1944	757th Bombardment Squadron
	North Apennines	10 September 1944 – 4 April 1945	757th Bombardment Squadron
	Rhineland	15 September 1944 – 21 March 1945	757th Bombardment Squadron
	Po Valley	3 April 1945 – 8 May 1945	757th Bombardment Squadron

== See also ==
- List of United States Air Force squadrons
- List of United States Air Force airlift squadrons
- List of United States Air Force fighter squadrons
- List of United States Air Force special operations squadrons
- B-24 Liberator units of the United States Army Air Forces
- List of C-130 Hercules operators
