= 909th Tactical Airlift Group =

909th Tactical Airlift Group

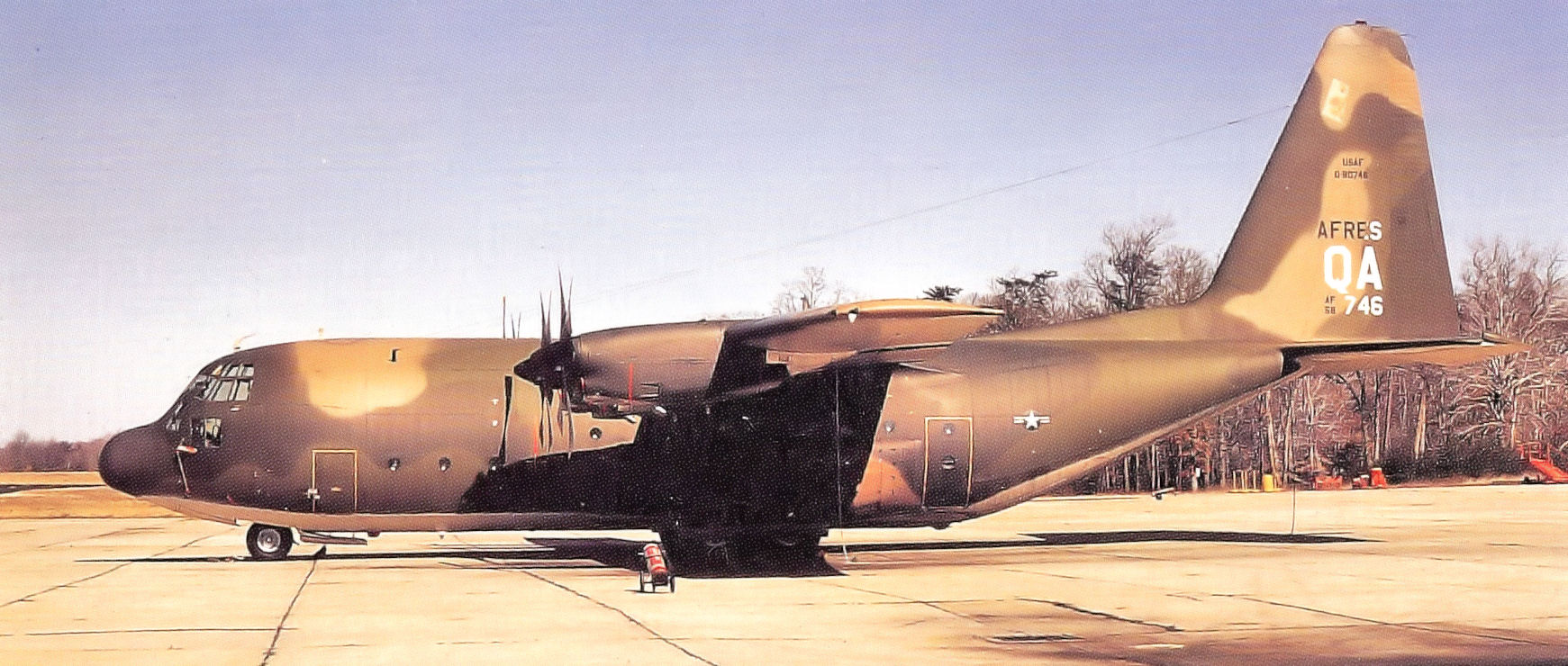
- Lockheed C-130B-LM Hercules 58-0746, 909th TAG, 1972
- Active: 1963–1975
- Country: United States
- Branch: United States Air Force
- Role: Airlift
- Part of: Air Force Reserve

The 909th Tactical Airlift Group is an inactive United States Air Force Reserve unit. It was last active with the 459th Tactical Airlift Wing at Andrews Air Force Base, Maryland, where it was inactivated on 1 September 1975.

== History ==
=== Need for reserve troop carrier groups ===
During the first half of 1955, the Air Force began detaching Air Force Reserve squadrons from their parent wing locations to separate sites. The concept offered several advantages. Communities were more likely to accept the smaller squadrons than the large wings and the location of separate squadrons in smaller population centers would facilitate recruiting and manning. Continental Air Command (ConAC)'s plan called for placing Air Force Reserve units at fifty-nine installations located throughout the United States. When these relocations were completed in 1959, reserve wing headquarters and wing support elements would typically be on one base, along with one (or in some cases two) of the wing's flying squadrons, while the remaining flying squadrons were spread over thirty-five Air Force, Navy and civilian airfields under what was called the Detached Squadron Concept.

Although this dispersal was not a problem when the entire wing was called to active service, mobilizing a single flying squadron and elements to support it proved difficult. This weakness was demonstrated in the partial mobilization of reserve units during the Berlin Crisis of 1961 To resolve this, at the start of 1962, ConAC determined to reorganize its reserve wings by establishing groups with support elements for each of its troop carrier squadrons. This reorganization would facilitate mobilization of elements of wings in various combinations when needed. However, as this plan was entering its implementation phase, another partial mobilization occurred for the Cuban Missile Crisis, with the units being released on 22 November 1962. The formation of troop carrier groups occurred in January 1963 for units that had not been mobilized, but was delayed until February for those that had been.

=== Activation of 908th Troop Carrier Group ===
As a result, the 908th Troop Carrier Group was established at Andrews Air Force Base, Maryland on 11 February 1963, as the headquarters for the 756th Troop Carrier Squadron, which had been stationed there since June 1954. Along with group headquarters, a Combat Support Squadron, Materiel Squadron and a Tactical Hospital were organized to support the 754th.

The group's mission was to organize, recruit and train Air Force Reserve personnel in the tactical airlift of airborne forces, their equipment and supplies and delivery of these forces and materials by airdrop, landing or cargo extraction systems. The group was equipped with Fairchild C-119 Flying Boxcars for Tactical Air Command airlift operations.

The 909th was one of three C-119 groups assigned to the 459th Troop Carrier Wing in 1963, the others being the 910th Troop Carrier Group at Youngstown Municipal Airport, Ohio, and the 911th Troop Carrier Group at Pittsburgh International Airport, Pennsylvania.

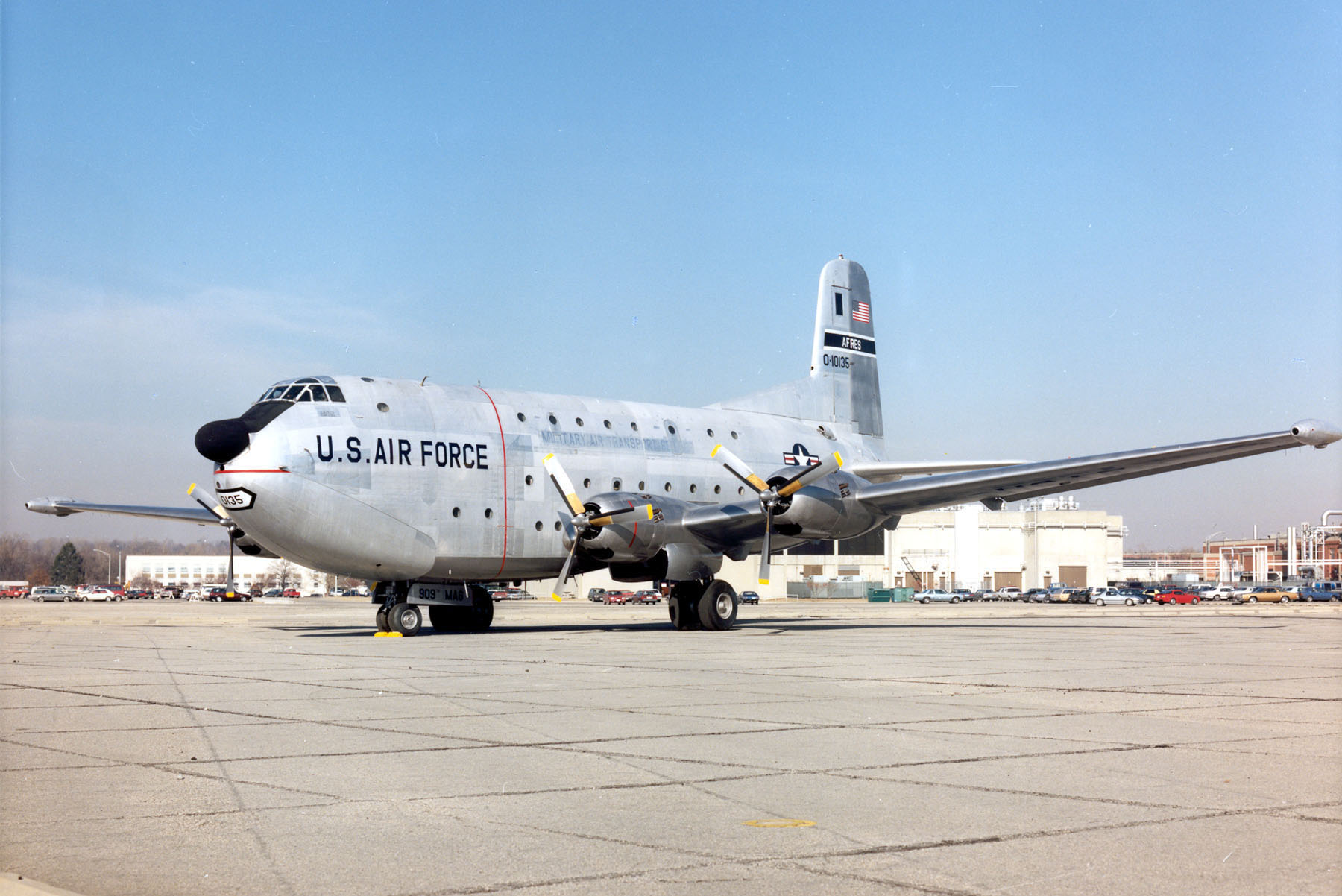
Douglas C-124C Globemaster II 52-1066 of the 909th Military Airlift Group (Note: This aircraft is now at the National Museum of the United States Air Force, marked as 51–135.)

Re-equipped 1966 with long-range Douglas C-124 Globemaster II heavy airlifter, performed intercontinental strategic airlift for Military Air Transport Service. Converted to the C-130 Hercules theater transport in 1971 as part of the phaseout of the Globemaster, Assigned Tail Code "QA". The Group participated in air transport of airborne forces, equipment and supplies with delivery by airdrop, extraction, and airlanding, as well as air evacuation within a theater of operations.

Inactivated in 1975 as part of the phasedown after the Vietnam War, Personnel and equipment reassigned directly to the 459th Wing at Andrews.

== Lineage ==
- Established as the 909th Troop Carrier Group, and activated on 15 January 1963 (not organized)

Organized in the Reserve on 11 February 1963
Redesignated 909th Military Airlift Group on 1 July 1966
Redesignated 909th Tactical Airlift Group on 29 June 1971
Inactivated on 1 September 1975

=== Assignments ===
- Continental Air Command, 15 January 1963 (not organized)
- 459th Troop Carrier Wing (later 459th Military Airlift Wing, 459th Tactical Airlift Wing), 11 February 1963 – 1 September 1975

=== Components ===
- 756th Troop Carrier Squadron (later 756th Military Airlift Squadron, 756th Tactical Airlift Squadron), 11 February 1963 – 1 September 1975

=== Stations ===
- Andrews Air Force Base, Maryland, 11 February 1963 – 1 September 1975

=== Aircraft ===
- Fairchild C-119 Flying Boxcar, 1957–1966
- Douglas C-124 Globemaster II, 1966–1971
- Lockheed C-130 Hercules, 1971–1975
