= 459th Operations Group =

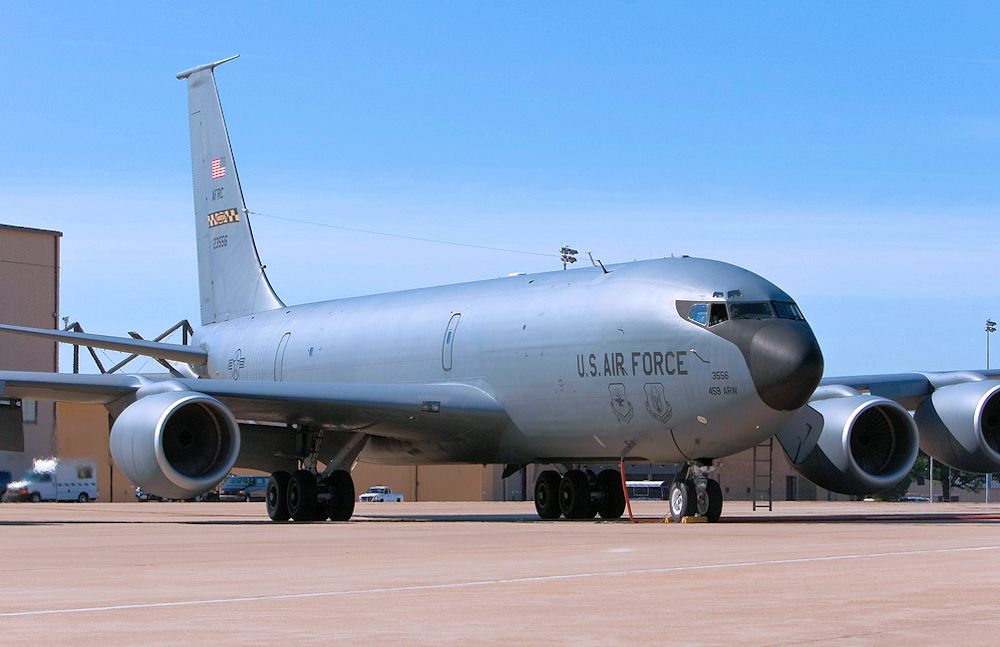
- 459th Air Operations Group – Boeing KC-135R Stratotanker
- Active: 1943–1945; 1947–1951; 1955–1959; 1992–present
- Country: United States
- Branch: United States Air Force
- Role: Aerial refueling
- Part of: 459th Air Refueling Wing
- Garrison/HQ: Joint Base Andrews, Maryland
- Motto: Ducit Amor Patriae Latin Led by Love of Country (World War II)
- Engagements: Mediterranean Theater of Operations
- Decorations: Distinguished Unit Citation; Air Force Outstanding Unit Award

Commanders
- Current commander: Colonel Matthew J Ihlenfeld

Insignia
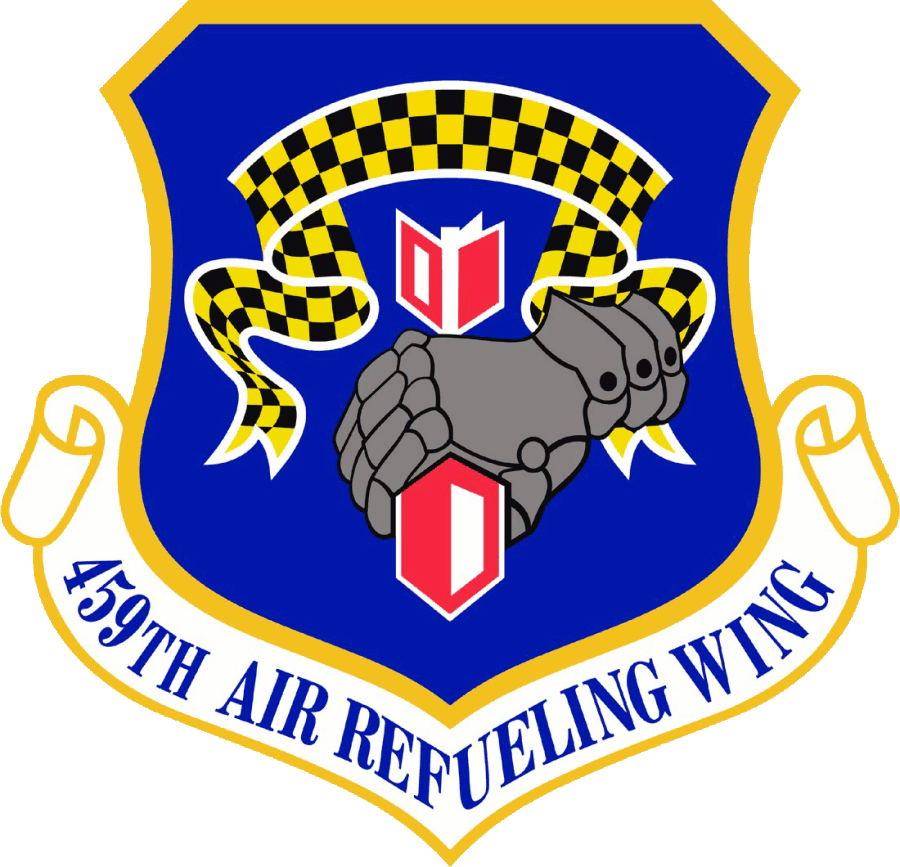
- 459th Air Refueling Wing emblem (Note: The group uses the wing emblem with the group designation on the scroll. Robertson.)
- Tail Code: Black/Yellow check tail stripe "Andrews" in yellow
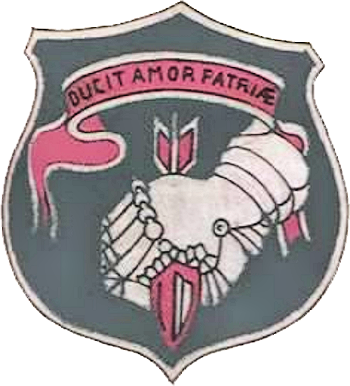
- 459th Bombardment Group emblem

Aircraft flown
- Tanker: Boeing KC-135 Stratotanker

The 459th Operations Group is a reserve component of the United States Air Force. It is assigned to the 459th Air Refueling Wing, Fourth Air Force of Air Force Reserve Command, at Joint Base Andrews, Maryland. If mobilized, the Wing is gained by Air Mobility Command.

The group's mission is to recruit, train and equip its citizen airmen to fly and maintain the Boeing KC-135 Stratotanker to help the Air Force protect its interests in air and space power. It consists of the 756th Air Refueling Squadron, 459th Aeromedical Evacuation Squadron, and the 459th Operations Support Flight.

== History ==
=== World War II ===
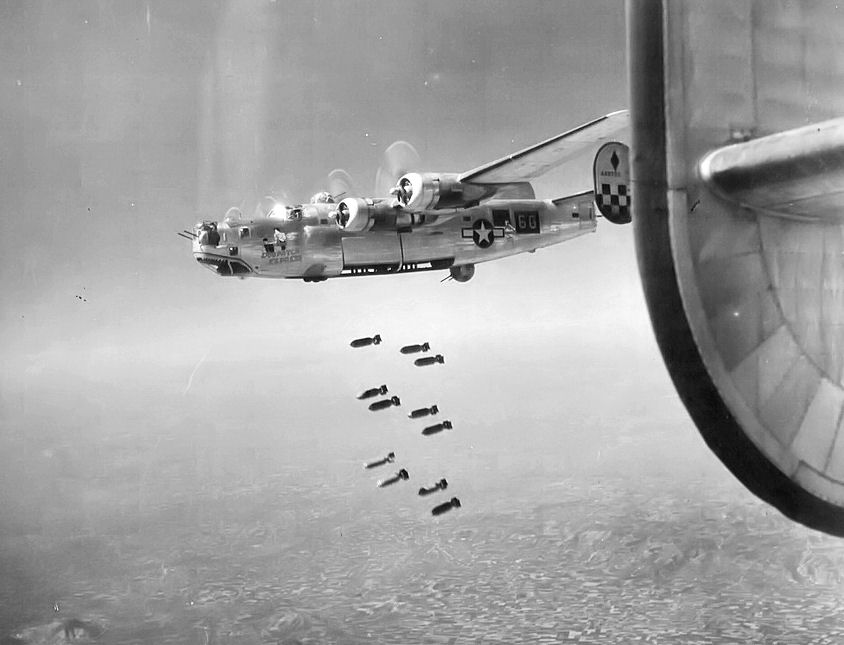
459th Bombardment Group B-24 bombing near Padua, Italy (Note: Aircraft is Ford Motors built B-24L-10-FO Liberator, serial 44-49750. Taken in 1945.)

The group was first activated as the 459th Bombardment Group on 1 July 1943 at Alamogordo Army Air Field, along with its component 756th, 757th, 758th, and 759th Bombardment Squadrons. The group trained with Consolidated B-24 Liberators under Second Air Force Until October, when it moved to Westover Field, Massachusetts. The group flew long-range convoy escort missions over area between the Newfoundland Banks and Long Island Sound in November and December 1943 while Giulia Airfield, its station in Italy, was being constructed. In January 1944, the group began its overseas movement.

The 459th Group arrived in Italy in February 1944 and began flying combat missions in March. It engaged in very long range strategic bombing missions to enemy military, industrial and transportation targets in Italy, France, Germany, Austria, Hungary, Romania, and Yugoslavia, bombing railroad marshalling yards, oil refineries, airfields, heavy industry, and other strategic objectives. In April 1944, the 459th Group led the 304th Bombardment Wing in an attack on an airfield and aircraft factory at Bad Vöslau, Austria through heavy flak and fighter attacks. It was awarded a Distinguished Unit Citation for this action.

In addition to strategic missions, the group also carried out support and interdiction operations. In March 1944, the 459th attacked railroads used to supply enemy forces surrounding the Anzio beachhead. In August, it struck bridges, harbors, and troop concentrations to aid Operation Dragoon, the invasion of Southern France. It also hit communications lines and other targets during March and April 1945 to support the advance of British Eighth Army and American Fifth Army in northern Italy. By the time it ceased combat operations in April 1945, it had flown nearly 200 combat missions.

The group returned to the United States in August 1945, earmarked to conduct strategic air raids on Japan with Boeing B-29 Superfortresses. A cadre reformed at Sioux Falls Army Air Field, South Dakota in the middle of the month. The Japanese surrender in August led to the inactivation of unit on 28 August.

=== Conversion to reserve and Korean mobilization ===
The 459th was reactivated as a reserve unit at Long Beach Army Air Field, California in April 1947. By July, all four of its World War II squadrons had been activated, with group headquarters and three squadrons at Long Beach, while the 759th Squadron was at Davis–Monthan Field. Also located at Davis–Monthan and assigned to the group was the 57th Fighter Squadron. Although nominally a heavy bomber unit, the group trained with North American T-6 Texans and Beechcraft T-7 Navigators and T-11 Kansans under the supervision of the 416th AAF Base Unit (later the 2347th Air Force Reserve Flying Training Center) of Air Defense Command (ADC) at Long Beach and the 419th AAF Base Unit (later the 2348th Air Force Reserve Flying Training Center) at Davis–Monthan. In July 1948, Continental Air Command (ConAC) assumed responsibility for managing reserve and Air National Guard units from ADC. President Truman’s reduced 1949 defense budget required reductions in the number of units in the Air Force. ConAC also reorganized its reserve units under the wing base organization system in June 1949, making the group and its squadrons at Long Beach surplus. The group's personnel and equipment at Long Beach were transferred to other reserve units.

However, the May 1949 Air Force Reserve program called for a new type of unit, the corollary unit, which was a reserve unit integrated with an active duty unit. The plan called for corollary units at 107 locations. It was viewed as the best method to train reservists by mixing them with an existing regular unit to perform duties alongside the regular unit. The group's 756th Squadron moved on paper to Smoky Hill Air Force Base, Kansas, where it was reassigned and became a corollary of Strategic Air Command's 301st Bombardment Wing. Meanwhile group headquarters moved without personnel or equipment to Davis–Monthan Air Force Base, where the 57th Fighter Squadron was inactivated and the group and its 759th Squadron became corollaries of Strategic Air Command (SAC)'s 43d Bombardment Group. Along with all other reserve corollary units, the group was mobilized for the Korean War. Once the group was mobilized in May 1951 SAC reassigned its personnel to other units and the unit inactivated the following month.

=== Reactivation in the reserve ===
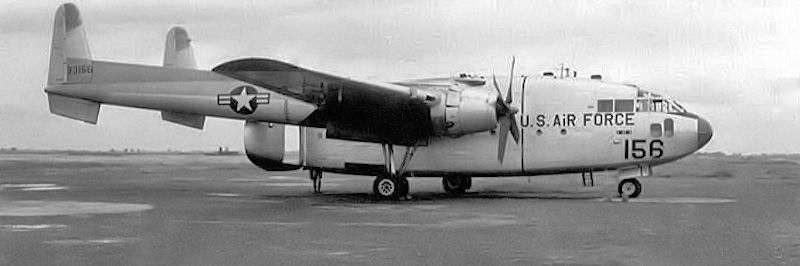
Fairchild C-119G Flying Boxcar

The reserve flying mission began at Andrews Air Force Base in the summer of 1954, when the 756th Troop Carrier Squadron was activated and equipped with Curtiss C-46 Commando aircraft. By January 1955, reserve operations at Andrews had grown enough to activate the group as the 459th Troop Carrier Group. During the first half of 1955, the Air Force began detaching Air Force reserve squadrons from their parent wing locations to separate sites. The concept offered several advantages: communities were more likely to accept the smaller squadrons than the large wings and the location of separate squadrons in smaller population centers would facilitate recruiting and manning. As it finally evolved in the spring of 1955, the ConAC plan called for placing Air Force reserve units at fifty-nine installations located throughout the United States. One of the first three squadrons involved in the program, the 757th Troop Carrier Squadron was activated at Byrd Field, Virginia and assigned to the group.

In the summer of 1956, the group participated in Operation Sixteen Ton during its two weeks of active duty training. Sixteen Ton was performed entirely by reserve troop carrier units and moved United States Coast Guard equipment From Floyd Bennett Naval Air Station to Isla Grande Airport in Puerto Rico and San Salvador in the Bahamas. After the success of Operation Sixteen Ton, the group began to use inactive duty training periods for Operation Swift Lift, transporting high priority cargo for the air force and Operation Ready Swap, transporting aircraft engines, between Air Materiel Command's depots.

The Joint Chiefs of Staff were pressuring the Air Force to provide more wartime airlift. At the same time, about 150 Fairchild C-119 Flying Boxcars became available from the active force. A third squadron of the group, the 758th Troop Carrier Squadron, was activated at Greater Pittsburgh Airport, Pennsylvania in November 1957, while the 757th Squadron simultaneously moved without personnel or equipment to Youngstown Municipal Airport, Ohio. (Note: The Air Force was also converting the reserve to an all-troop carrier force, and the 757th replaced a reserve fighter squadron at Youngstown. Cantwell, p. 168.) Both were equipped with the C-119, while the 756th Squadron had begun its own conversion from the C-46.

In April 1959 as Continental Air Command converted its operational wing to the dual deputy organization, in which flying and maintenance squadrons were assigned directly to wing headquarters and the group inactivated.

=== Activation as operations group ===
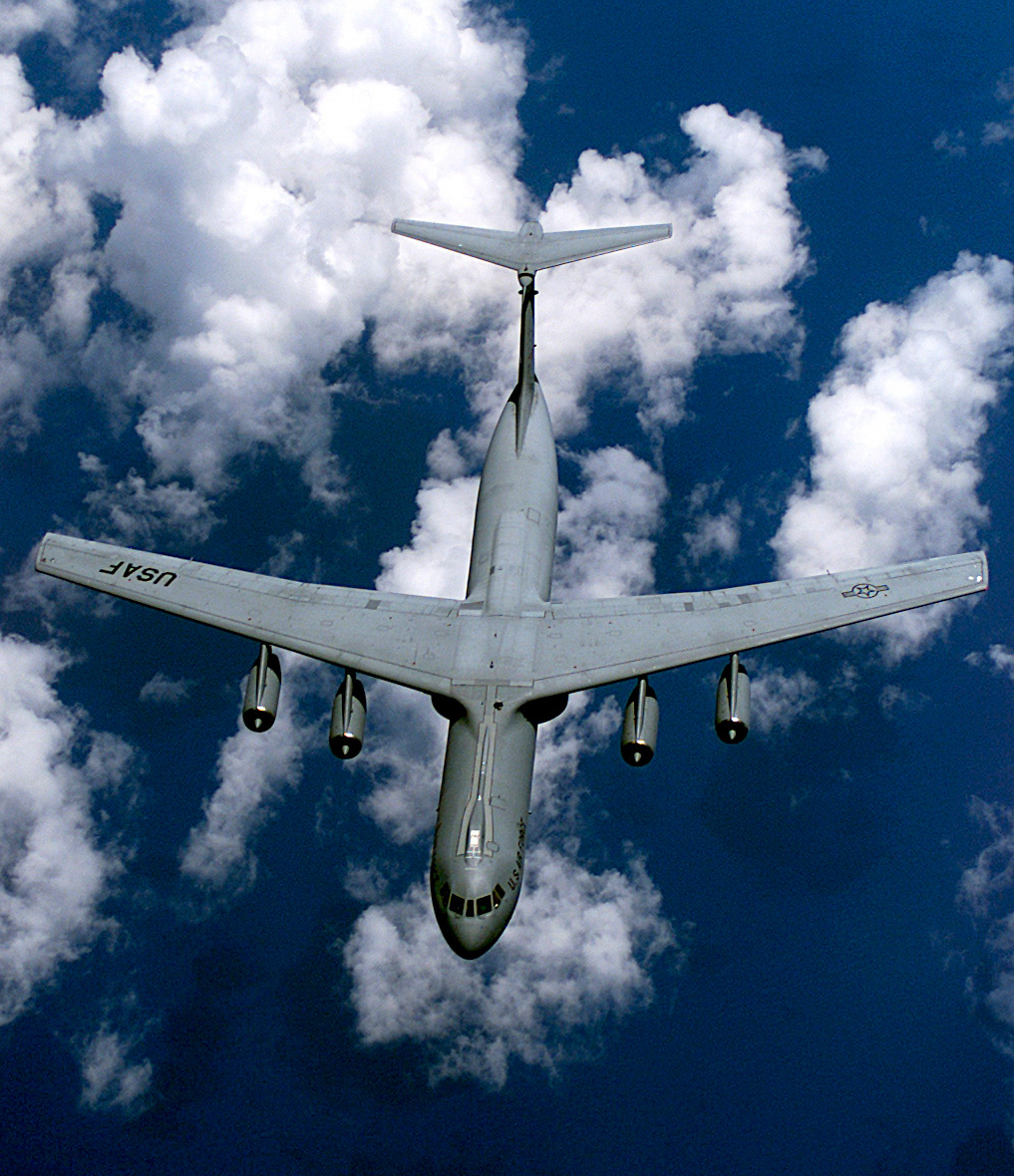
C-141B as flown by the group from 1992 to 2003

The group was redesignated the 459th Operations Group and reactivated in August 1992 as part of Air Force Reserve Command's reorganization of its units under the Objective Wing model. The group was equipped with the Lockheed C-141B Starlifter. Until September 1994, it participated in contingency and humanitarian airlift operations, training exercises, Air Mobility Command channel flights, and aeromedical evacuation missions. It also provided airlift for the deployment of other units. From October 2001 until September 2003, it supported Operation Enduring Freedom and Operation Iraqi Freedom with intertheater airlift.

In 2003, the group mission changed from airlift to air refueling and replaced its Starlifters with Boeing KC-135R Stratotankers. It deployed aircraft and crews in 2005 to provide air refueling support of Operation Iraqi Freedom, adding global air refueling missions to its airlift capabilities.

== Lineage ==
- Established as the 459th Bombardment Group (Heavy) on 19 May 1943

Activated on 1 July 1943
Redesignated 459th Bombardment Group, Heavy on 20 August 1943
Inactivated on 28 August 1945

- Redesignated 459th Bombardment Group, Very Heavy on 11 March 1947

Activated in the reserve on 19 April 1947
Redesignated 459th Bombardment Group, Medium on 27 June 1949
Ordered to active service on 1 May 1951
Inactivated on 16 June 1951
Redesignated 459th Troop Carrier Group, Medium, on 30 December 1954
Activated in the reserve on 26 January 1955
Inactivated on 14 April 1959
Redesignated 459th Tactical Airlift Group on 31 July 1985 (remained inactive)
Redesignated 459th Operations Group and activated in the reserve on 1 August 1992

=== Assignments ===
- Second Air Force, 1 July 1943
- First Air Force, 31 October 1943
- 304th Bombardment Wing, 25 January 1944
- Second Air Force, 13–28 August 1945
- 304 Bombardment Wing (later 304th Air Division), 19 April 1947
- Eighth Air Force, 27 June 1949 (attached to 43d Bombardment Group)
- Fifteenth Air Force, 1 April 1950 – 16 June 1951 (attached to 43d Bombardment Group until 10 February 1951, then to 43d Bombardment Wing)
- 459th Troop Carrier Wing, 26 January 1955 – 14 April 1959
- 459th Airlift Wing (later 459th Air Refueling Wing), 1 August 1992 – present

=== Components ===
- 57th Fighter Squadron: 15 May 1947 – 27 June 1949
- 459th Aeromedical Evacuation Squadron: 1 October 1994 – present
- 459th Operations Support Squadron (later 459th Operations Support Flight): 1 August 1992 – present
- 756th Bombardment Squadron (later 756th Troop Carrier Squadron, 756th Airlift Squadron, Air Refueling) Squadron: 1 July 1943 – 28 August 1945; 19 April 1947 – 26 June 1949; 26 January 1955 – 14 April 1959; 1 August 1992 – present
- 757th Bombardment Squadron (later 757th Troop Carrier Squadron): 1 July 1943 – 28 August 1945; 12 July 1947 – 27 June 1949; 8 April 1955 – 14 April 1959
- 758th Bombardment Squadron (later 758th Troop Carrier Squadron): 1 July 1943 – 28 August 1945; 12 July 1947 – 27 June 1949; 16 November 1957 – 14 April 1959
- 759th Bombardment Squadron: 1 July 1943 – 28 August 1945; 12 July 1947 – 16 June 1951
- 459th Airlift Control Flight: c. 1 August 1992 – c. 1 October 2003

=== Stations ===
- Alamogordo Army Air Field, New Mexico, 1 July 1943
- Davis–Monthan Field, Arizona, 28 July 1943
- Kearns Army Air Field, Utah, c. 31 August 1943
- Davis–Monthan Field, Arizona, c. 21 September 1943
- Westover Field, Massachusetts, 31 October 1943 – 3 January 1944
- Giulia Airfield, Italy, c. 12 February 1944 – c July 1945
- Sioux Falls Army Air Field, South Dakota, c. 16–28 August 1945
- Long Beach Army Air Field, California, 19 April 1947
- Davis–Monthan Air Force Base, Arizona, 27 June 1949 – 16 June 1951
- Andrews Air Force Base, Maryland, 26 January 1955 – 14 April 1959
- Andrews Air Force Base (later Joint Base Andrews), Maryland, 1 August 1992 – present

=== Aircraft ===
- Consolidated B-24 Liberator, 1943–1945
- Curtiss C-46 Commando, 1955–1957
- Fairchild C-119 Flying Boxcar, 1957–1959
- Lockheed C-141 Starlifter, 1992–2003
- Boeing KC-135 Stratotanker, 2003–present

=== Awards and campaigns ===
Award streamer	Award	Dates	Notes
	Distinguished Unit Citation	23 April 1944 Bad Vöslau, Austria	459th Bombardment Group
	Air Force Outstanding Unit Award	1 October 1993-30 September 1995	459th Operations Group
	Air Force Outstanding Unit Award	1 May 2002–30 April 2004	459th Operations Group
	Air Force Outstanding Unit Award	1 January 2005 – 31 December 2006	459th Operations Group

Campaign Streamer	Campaign	Dates	Notes
	Air Offensive, Europe	12 February 1944 – 5 June 1944	459th Bombardment Group
	Air Combat, EAME Theater	12 February 1944 – 11 May 1945	459th Bombardment Group
	Rome-Arno	12 February 1944 – 9 September 1944	459th Bombardment Group
	Central Europe	22 March 1944 – 21 May 1945	459th Bombardment Group
	Normandy	6 June 1944 – 24 July 1944	459th Bombardment Group
	Northern France	25 July 1944 – 14 September 1944	459th Bombardment Group
	Southern France	15 August 1944 – 14 September 1944	459th Bombardment Group
	North Apennines	10 September 1944 – 4 April 1945	459th Bombardment Group
	Rhineland	15 September 1944 – 21 March 1945	459th Bombardment Group
	Po Valley	3 April 1945 – 8 May 1945	459th Bombardment Group
