= 910th Airlift Wing =

910th Airlift Wing

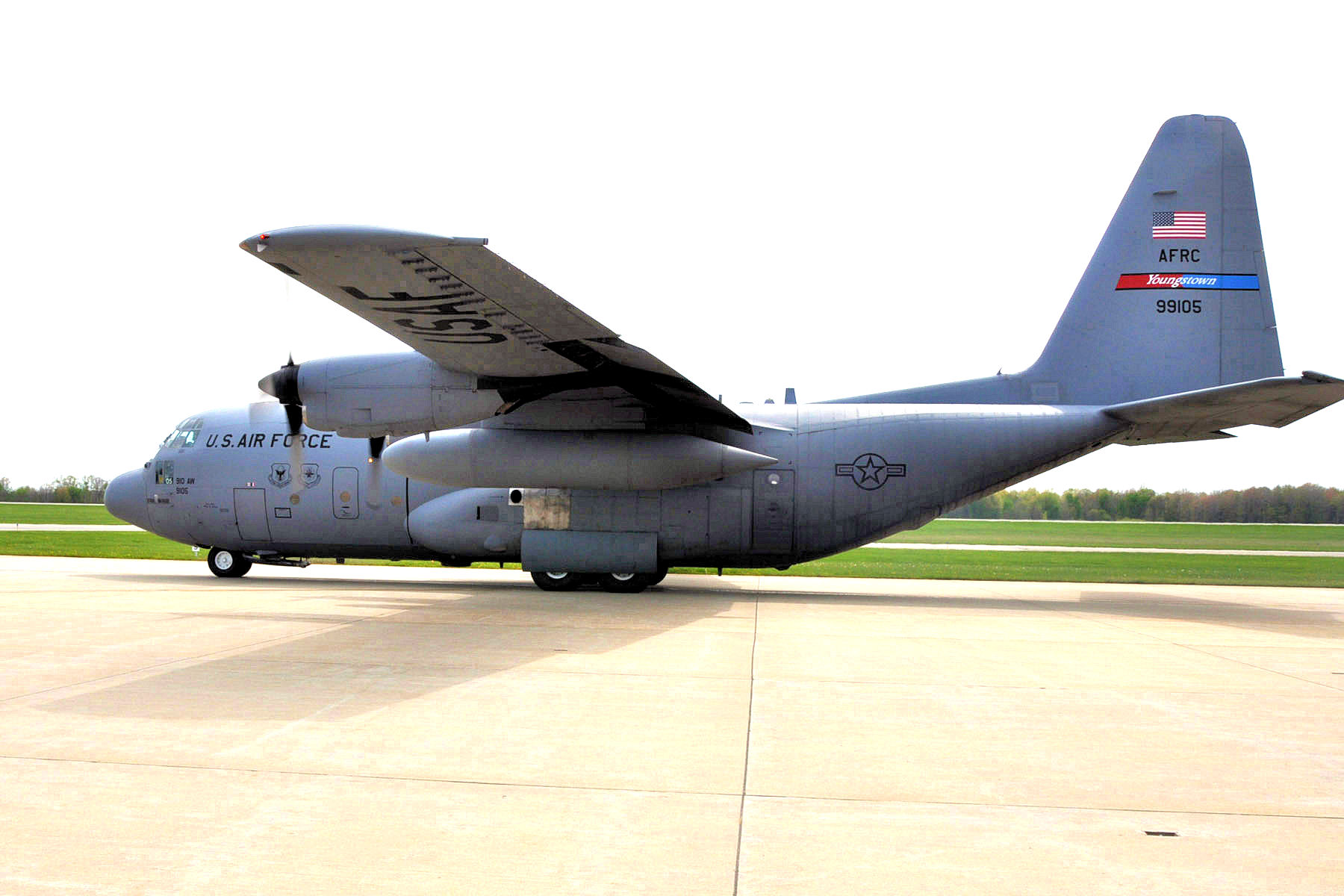
- Wing Lockheed C-130H Hercules
- Active: 1963—present
- Country: United States
- Branch: United States Air Force
- Type: Airlift
- Size: 1,400 Personnel
- Part of: Air Force Reserve Command: Twenty-Second Air Force
- Garrison/HQ: Youngstown Air Reserve Station, Ohio
- Decorations: Air Force Outstanding Unit Award; Republic of Vietnam Gallantry Cross with Palm

Commanders
- Current commander: Colonel Christopher E. Sedlacek

Insignia
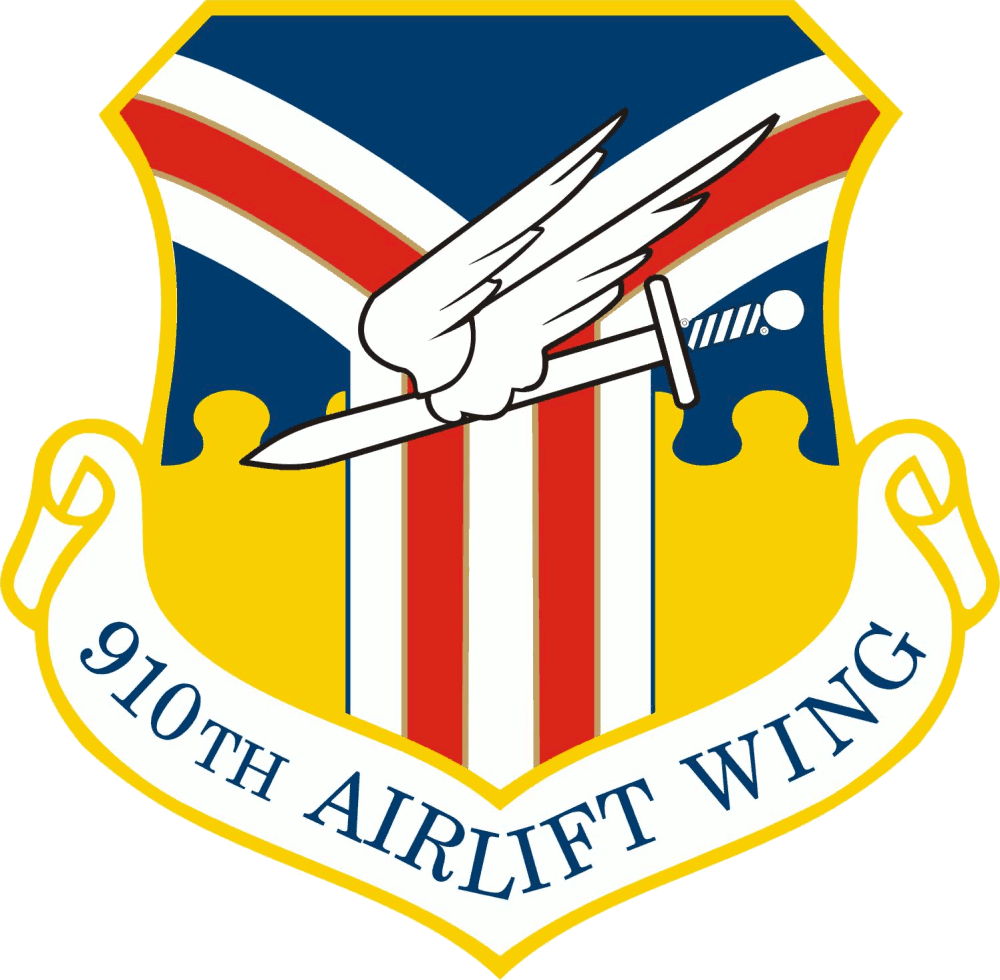
- 910th Airlift Wing emblem (Note: Approved 22 March 1995.)

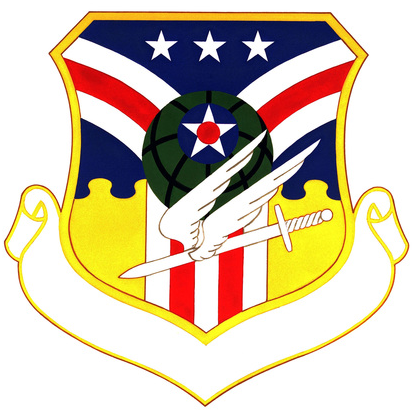
- 910th Tactical Airlift Group emblem (Note: Approved 1984.)

- Tail stripe

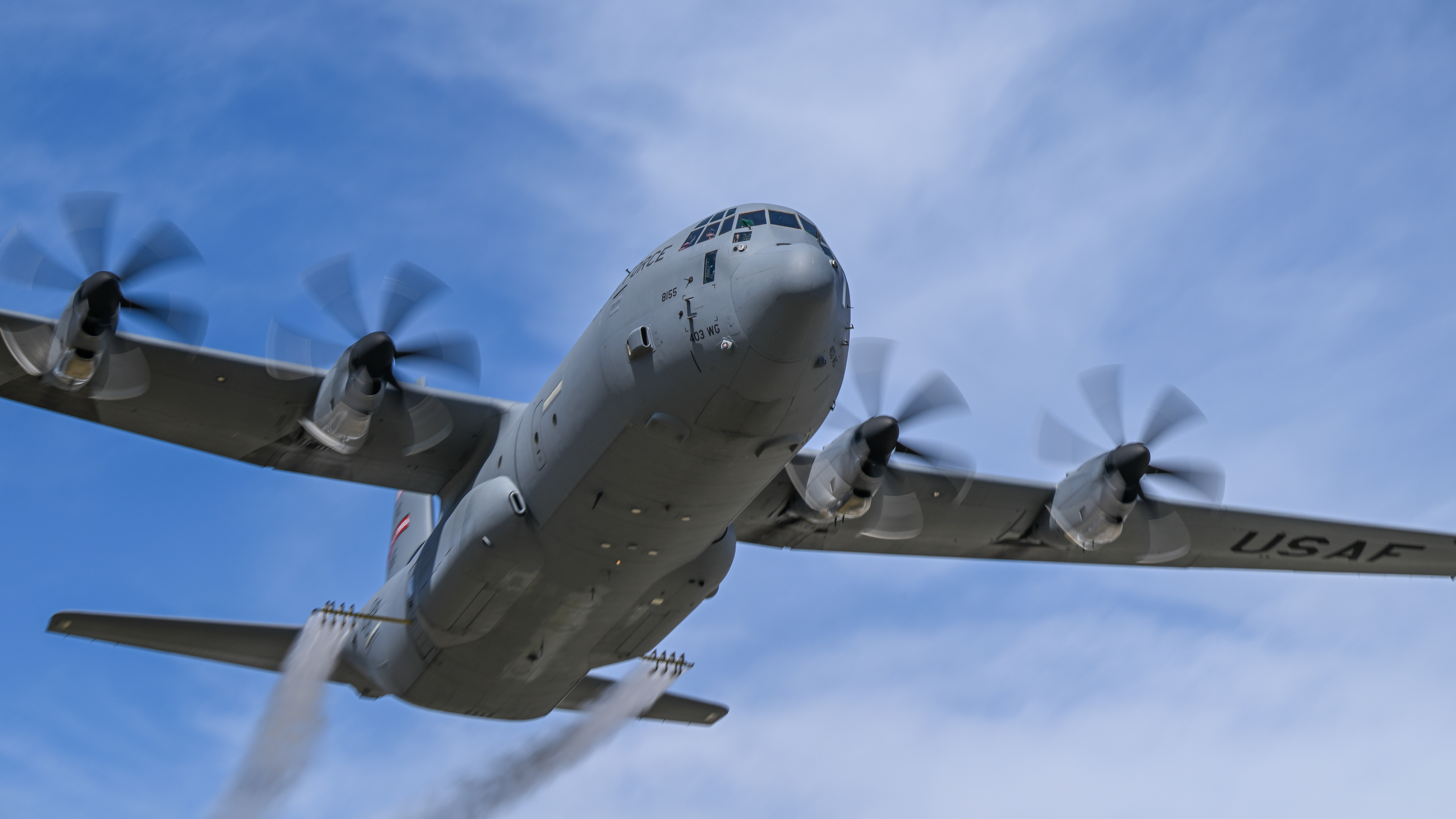
A C-130J tests the electronic modular aerial spray system. (Note: The flight test was performed to ensure the operability of the spray system aboard the airframe as the 910th prepares to upgrade its aging C-130H Hercules fleet to new J-models.)

The 910th Airlift Wing is an Air Force reserve unit, stationed at Youngstown Air Reserve Station, Ohio. It flies C-130H Hercules aircraft on airlift and aerial spray missions. The wing maintain the DoD’s only large area fixed-wing aerial spray capability to control disease-carrying insects, pest insects, undesirable vegetation and to disperse oil spills in large bodies of water using six C-130H aircraft equipped with the Modular Aerial Spray System (MASS).

== Overview ==
The 910th Airlift Wing is a United States Air Force Reserve Command unit located at Youngstown Air Reserve Station, Ohio. It is under the command of Twenty-Second Air Force of Air Force Reserve Command at Robins Air Force Base, Georgia. In the event of mobilization, the unit would be assigned to the Air Mobility Command, headquartered at Scott AFB, IL.

The 910th Airlift Wing's mission statement is "Combat ready NOW...for tomorrow's fight". In wartime, the 910th Airlift Wing mission is to employ the Lockheed C-130 Hercules aircraft in combat operations of tactical airlift. These operations include low-level infiltration into a combat environment, where aircrews can deliver personnel and materials by airdrop and air-land techniques.

The 910th Airlift Wing is composed of three groups and one medical unit, the 910th Medical Squadron. The 910th Operations Group is composed of one flying squadron and one support unit, the 910th Operations Support Squadron. The flying squadron is the 757th Airlift Squadron, which includes the only large-area, fixed-wing aerial spray mission in the Department of Defense. The 910th Maintenance Group is assigned two squadrons, the 910th Maintenance Squadron and the 910th Aircraft Maintenance Squadron. The 910th Mission Support Group is assigned seven units: the 910th Mission Support Flight, 910th Civil Engineer Squadron, 910th Security Forces Squadron, 910th Force Support Squadron, 910th Logistics Readiness Squadron, 76th Aerial Port Squadron and 910th Communications Squadron.

== Units ==
- 910th Airlift Wing
- 910th Operations Group
  - 757th Airlift Squadron
  - 910th Operations Support Squadron
- 910th Maintenance Group
  - 910th Aircraft Maintenance Squadron
  - 910th Maintenance Squadron
- 910th Mission Support Group
  - 910th Civil Engineer Squadron
  - 910th Security Forces Squadron
  - 910th Communications Squadron
  - 910th Logistics Readiness Squadron
  - 76th Aerial Port Squadron
  - 910th Force Support Squadron
- 910th Medical Squadron

== History ==
=== Need for reserve troop carrier groups ===
During the first half of 1955, the Air Force began detaching Air Force Reserve squadrons from their parent wing locations to separate sites. The concept offered several advantages. Communities were more likely to accept the smaller squadrons than the large wings and the location of separate squadrons in smaller population centers would facilitate recruiting and manning. Continental Air Command (ConAC)'s plan called for placing Air Force Reserve units at fifty-nine installations located throughout the United States. When these relocations were completed in 1959, reserve wing headquarters and wing support elements would typically be on one base, along with one (or in some cases two) of the wing's flying squadrons, while the remaining flying squadrons were spread over thirty-five Air Force, Navy and civilian airfields under what was called the Detached Squadron Concept.

Although this dispersal was not a problem when the entire wing was called to active service, mobilizing a single flying squadron and elements to support it proved difficult. This weakness was demonstrated in the partial mobilization of reserve units during the Berlin Crisis of 1961 To resolve this, at the start of 1962, ConAC determined to reorganize its reserve wings by establishing groups with support elements for each of its troop carrier squadrons. This reorganization would facilitate mobilization of elements of wings in various combinations when needed. However, as this plan was entering its implementation phase, another partial mobilization occurred for the Cuban Missile Crisis, with the units being released on 22 November 1962. The formation of troop carrier groups occurred in January 1963 for units that had not been mobilized, but was delayed until February for those that had been.

=== Activation of 910th Troop Carrier Group ===
As a result, the 910th Troop Carrier Group was established at Youngstown Air Reserve Station, Ohio on 17 January 1963, as the headquarters for the 757th Troop Carrier Squadron, which had been stationed there since November 1957. Along with group headquarters, a Combat Support Squadron, Materiel Squadron and a Tactical Infirmary were organized to support the 757th.

The group's mission was to organize, recruit and train Air Force Reserve personnel in the tactical airlift of airborne forces, their equipment and supplies and delivery of these forces and materials by airdrop, landing or cargo extraction systems. The group was equipped with Fairchild C-119 Flying Boxcars for Tactical Air Command airlift operations.

The 910th was one of three C-119 groups assigned to the 459th Troop Carrier Wing in 1963, the others being the 909th Troop Carrier Group at Andrews Air Force Base, Maryland, and the 911th Troop Carrier Group at Pittsburgh International Airport, Pennsylvania.

The 910th participated in tactical exercises, airlift operations, and joint operations with Army airborne forces in U.S. and overseas, 1963-1969. The group trained as a forward air control unit, 1970–1971; as a special operations group, 1971–1973; and as a fighter group, 1973-1981. It converted again to an airlift mission in 1981 and received its first C-130 aircraft on 27 March 1981.

The 910th periodically deployed to Panama to support Air Force missions in Central and South America, beginning in 1983. It has trained to airdrop and airland personnel and materiel and added the only full-time, fixed-wing aerial spray in the Department of Defense in January 1992. It has deployed personnel and equipment worldwide to support contingency operations, exercises, and humanitarian missions.

In May 1995, the 910th Airlift Group was re-designated the 910th Airlift Wing, with 16 permanently assigned and authorized aircraft. Youngstown Air Reserve Station was also named as the site for a regional maintenance facility.

November 2003, the 910th transferred four C-130 aircraft to the 934th Airlift Wing at Minneapolis-St Paul Air Reserve Station. The transfer left the 910th with 12 permanently assigned C-130H2 aircraft.

The unit was tasked from September to October 2005 to combat the potential deadly spread of infectious diseases from insect bites due to the flooding in the aftermath of Hurricanes Katrina and Rita in late August and in September 2005. When the mission concluded, the 910th helped the people of Louisiana and Texas by spraying more than 2.9 million acres (12,000 km^{2}). This was the largest aerial spray tasking since the mission's conception in 1973.

From May to June 2010, The 910th's 757th Airlift Squadron conducted aerial spray for Operation Deep Water Horizon. The aerial spray mission used dispersing agents to neutralize the oil spill caused by the April 2010 sinking of the Deepwater Horizon drilling platform in the Gulf of Mexico. This mission marked the first real world application of oil spill dispersants by the 910th.

From November 2011 to March 2014, Air Force structure changes reduced the 910th's Primary Assigned Aircraft from 12 to eight, with one Back-up Inventory Aircraft. The reduction in aircraft resulted in the inactivation of the 773d Airlift Squadron, which was activated as a unit of the 910th in 1995.

From June 2014 to Sept. 2014, more than 110 members from the 910th Airlift Wing's flying and maintenance squadrons supported airlift operations to various military installations throughout the U.S. Central Command (USCENTCOM) Area of Operations. During their deployment, the 910th service members and aircraft completed 1,275 flying hours during the course of 300 missions. During these missions, the aircrews moved 4,311 passengers, hauled 1813 tons of cargo and transported 36 patients for a mission effectiveness rate of 100%.

In 2022, members of the 910th Airlift Wing deployed to Africa as part of the 75th Expeditionary Airlift Squadron (75th EAS) at Camp Lemonnier, Djibouti. The 75th EAS is responsible for airlift in support of Combined Joint Task Force – Horn of Africa (CJTF–HOA).

== Lineage ==
- Established as the 910th Troop Carrier Group, Medium and activated on 28 December 1962 (not organized)

Organized in the Reserve on 17 January 1963
Redesignated 910th Tactical Airlift Group on 1 July 1967
Redesignated 910th Tactical Air Support Group on 25 January 1970
Redesignated 910th Special Operations Group on 29 June 1971
Redesignated 910th Tactical Fighter Group on 1 October 1973
Redesignated 910th Tactical Airlift Group on 1 July 1981
Redesignated 910th Airlift Group on 1 February 1992
Redesignated 910th Airlift Wing on 1 October 1994

=== Assignments ===
- Continental Air Command, 28 December 1962 (not organized)
- 459th Troop Carrier Wing, 17 January 1963
- 302d Troop Carrier Wing (later 302d Tactical Airlift Wing), 1 July 1966
- Eastern Air Force Reserve Region, 15 February 1970
- 434th Special Operations Wing (later 434th Tactical Fighter Wing), 21 April 1971
- 459th Tactical Airlift Wing (later 459th Military Airlift Wing), 1 April 1981
- 94th Tactical Airlift (later, 94th Airlift) Wing, 1 October 1989
- 440th Airlift Wing, 1 August 1992
- Tenth Air Force, 1 October 1994
- Twenty-Second Air Force, 1 April 1997 – present

=== Components ===
- 757th Airlift Squadron: 17 Jan 1963 – 1 Aug 1992
- 910th Operations Group: 1 Aug 1992 – present

=== Stations ===
- Youngstown Air Reserve Station, Ohio, 17 Jan 1963 – present

=== Aircraft ===
- Fairchild C-119 Flying Boxcar (1963–1969)
- Cessna U-3 Blue Canoe (1969–1971)
- Cessna A-37 Dragonfly (1971–1981)
- Lockheed C-130 Hercules (1981–present)
