= 756th Air Refueling Squadron =

756th Air Refueling Squadron

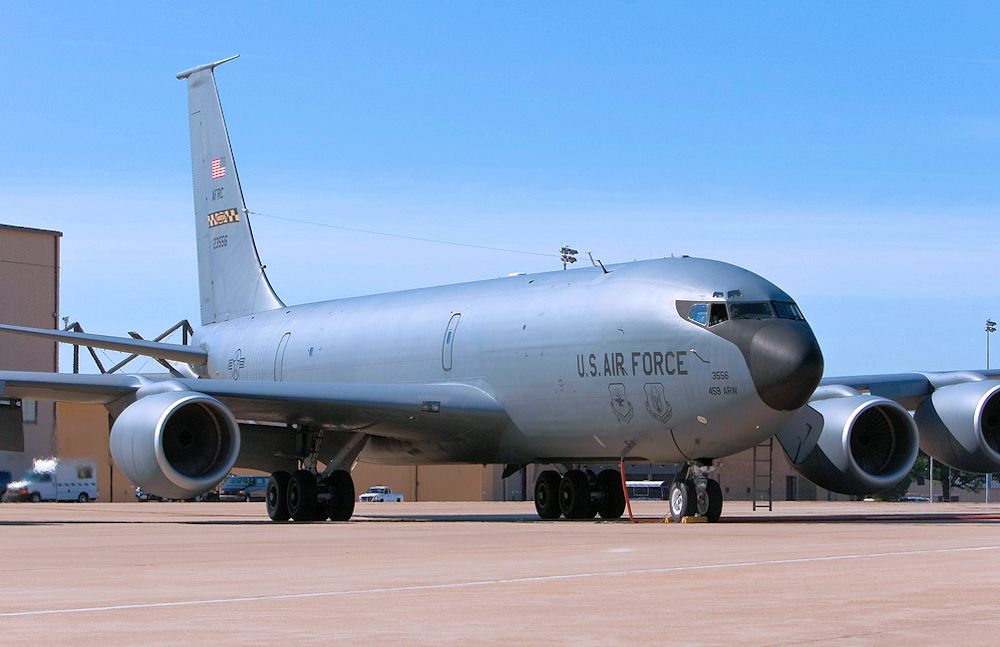
- 459th Air Refueling Wing KC-135R Stratotanker (Note: Aircraft is Boeing KC-135R-BN Stratotanker, serial 62-3556 (manufactured as Boeing KC-135A-BN).)
- Active: 1943–1945; 1947–1951; 1954–present
- Country: United States
- Branch: United States Air Force
- Role: Air refueling
- Part of: Air Force Reserve Command
- Garrison/HQ: Andrews Air Force Base
- Nickname: Toothless Tigers (1961–1984)
- Engagements: Mediterranean Theater of Operations; Operation Just Cause
- Decorations: Distinguished Unit Citation; Air Force Outstanding Unit Award; Republic of Vietnam Gallantry Cross with Palm

Insignia
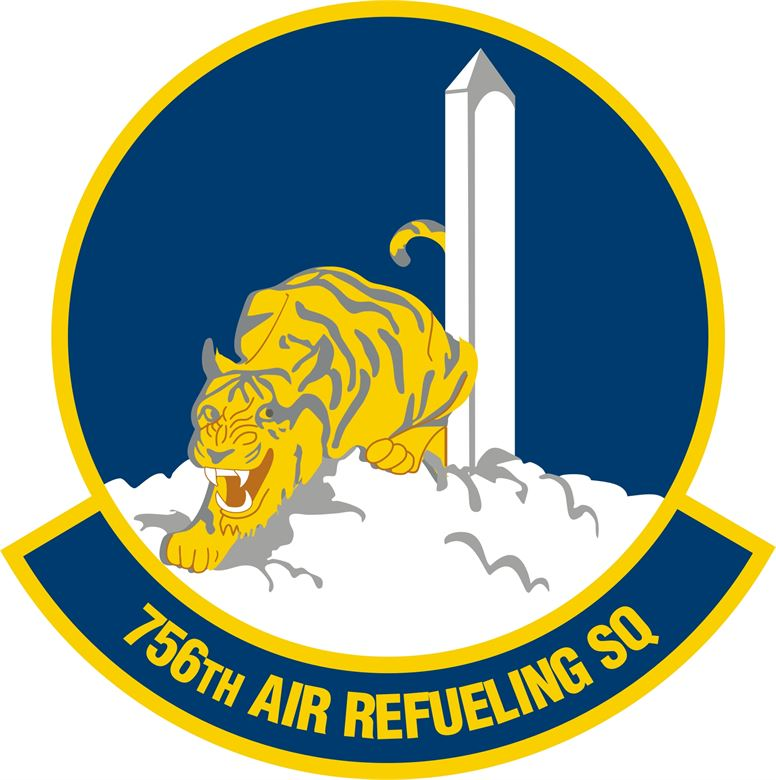
- 756 Air Refueling Squadron emblem (Note: Approved c. October 1984)

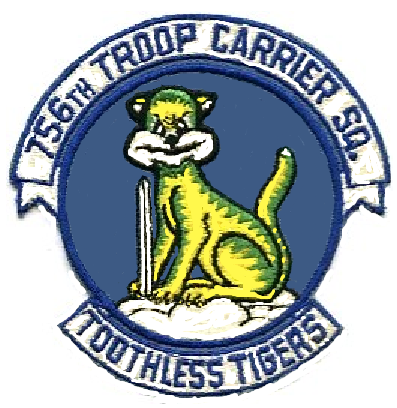
- Patch with 756th Troop Carrier Squadron emblem (Note: Approved 21 February 1961. Description: On a sky blue disc bordered Air Force blue, a white cloud formation issuing from base, shaded sky blue; sitting on the cloud an Air Force golden yellow caricatured tiger, wearing a toothless snarl, his face, eyeball, lining of ears, and tip of tail white, stripes green; between his forepaws the Washington Monument white, shaded sky blue; outlines and details black throughout.)

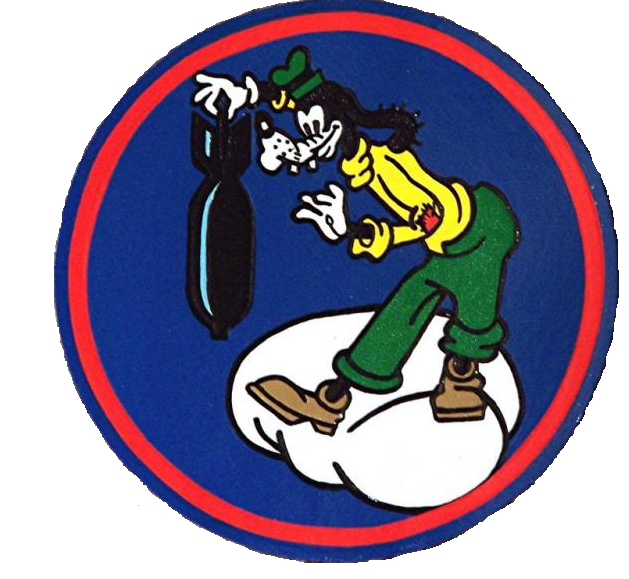
- 756th Bombardment Squadron emblem

Aircraft flown
- Tanker: KC-135 Stratotanker

The 756th Air Refueling Squadron is a United States Air Force Reserve squadron, assigned to the 459th Operations Group, stationed at Joint Base Andrews, Maryland.

The squadron was first activated during World War II as the 756th Bombardment Squadron. After training in the United States, it deployed to the Mediterranean Theater of Operations, where it participated in the strategic bombing campaign against Germany, and it earned a Distinguished Unit Citation for its actions. Following V-E Day, the squadron returned to the United States and was inactivated.

In 1947, the squadron was reactivated in the reserves, but does not appear to have been fully manned or equipped before inactivating in June 1949. It was again activated in the reserves a few months later as a corollary unit, flying with the active duty 301st Bombardment Group. It was called to active duty for the Korean War, but did not serve as a unit, its personnel being used as fillers for other units, while the squadron was inactivated.

The squadron was redesignated the 756th Troop Carrier Squadron and again activated at Andrews in the reserve in 1954. It served as an airlift unit until 2003, when it converted to the air refueling mission.

== Mission ==
The squadron operates Boeing KC-135 Stratotanker aircraft conducting air refueling missions.

== History ==
=== World War II ===
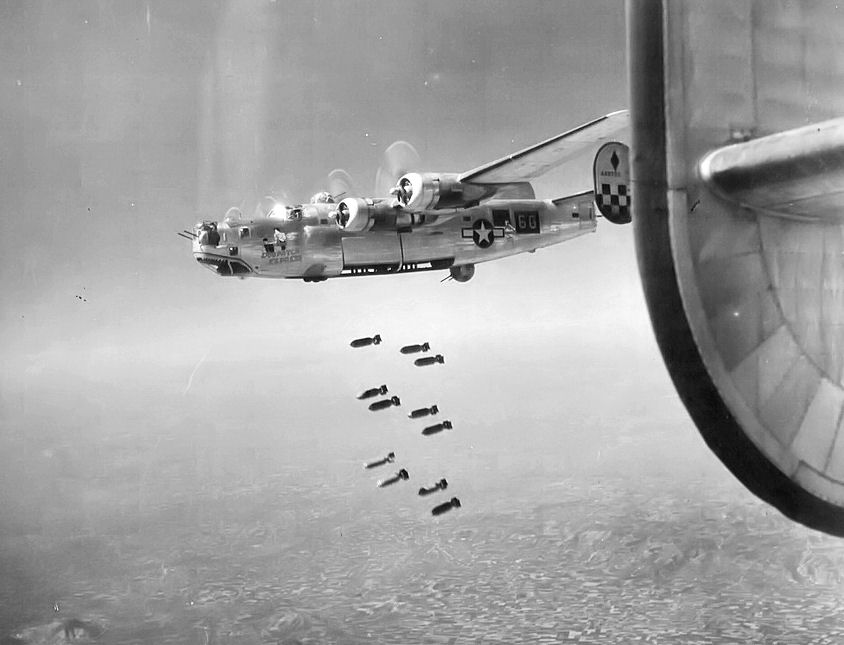
756th Bombardment Squadron B-24 Liberator attacking a target (Note: Aircraft is Ford Motors built Consolidated B-24L-10-FO Liberator, serial 44-49750. This plane returned to the United States after the war and was scrapped at Kingman Army Air Field on 16 November 1945. Baugher, Joe (10 June 2023). "1944 USAF Serial Numbers". Joe Baugher. Photo taken while bombing near Padua, Italy on 4 May 2945.)

The squadron was first activated on 1 July 1943 at Alamogordo Army Air Field, New Mexico as the 756th Bombardment Squadron, one of the four original squadrons of the 459th Bombardment Group. The squadron trained with Consolidated B-24 Liberators under Second Air Force until October, when it moved to Westover Field, Massachusetts. The squadron flew long-range convoy escort missions over area between the Newfoundland Banks and Long Island Sound in November and December 1943 while Giulia Airfield, its station in Italy, was being constructed. In January 1944, the squadron began its overseas movement.

The squadron arrived in Italy in February 1944 and began flying combat missions in March. The squadron engaged in very long range strategic bombing missions to enemy military, industrial and transportation targets in Italy, France, Germany, Austria, Hungary, Romania, and Yugoslavia, bombing railroad marshalling yards, oil refineries, airfields, heavy industry, and other strategic objectives. In April 1944, the 459th Group led the 304th Bombardment Wing in an attack on an airfield and aircraft factory at Bad Vöslau, Austria through heavy flak and fighter attacks. The squadron was awarded a Distinguished Unit Citation for this action.

In addition to strategic missions, the squadron also carried out support and interdiction operations. In March 1944, the squadron attacked railroads used to supply enemy forces surrounding the Anzio beachhead. In August, it struck bridges, harbors, and troop concentrations to aid Operation Dragoon, the invasion of Southern France. It also hit communications lines and other targets during March and April 1945 to support the advance of British Eighth Army and American Fifth Army in northern Italy.

The squadron returned to the United States in August 1945, being programmed for deployment to the Pacific Theater as a Boeing B-29 Superfortress very heavy bombardment squadron. A cadre reformed at Sioux Falls Army Air Field, South Dakota in the middle of the month. The Japanese surrender in August led to the inactivation of unit on 28 August.

=== Activation in reserve and Korean War mobilization ===
The 756th was reactivated as a reserve unit at Long Beach Army Air Field, California in April 1947. Although nominally a heavy bomber unit, the squadron trained with North American T-6 Texans and Beechcraft T-7 Navigators and T-11 Kansans under the supervision of the 416th AAF Base Unit (later the 2347th Air Force Reserve Flying Training Center) of Air Defense Command (ADC). In July 1948, Continental Air Command (ConAC) assumed responsibility for managing reserve and Air National Guard units from ADC.

President Truman's reduced 1949 defense budget required reductions in the number of units in the Air Force. In June 1949 ConAC reorganized its reserve units under the wing base organization system, making the squadron surplus at Long Beach. The squadron's personnel and equipment were transferred to other reserve units there. However, the May 1949 Air Force Reserve program called for a new type of unit, the Corollary Unit, which was a reserve unit integrated with an active duty unit. The plan called for corollary units at 107 locations. It was viewed as the best method to train reservists by mixing them with an existing regular unit to perform duties alongside the regular unit. The 756th became a corollary squadron, moving on paper to Smoky Hill Air Force Base, Kansas, where it became a corollary of Strategic Air Command's 301st Bombardment Wing. In the fall of 1949, the 301st Wing moved to Barksdale Air Force Base, Louisiana, and the 756th moved with it. Along with all other reserve corollary units, the squadron was mobilized for the Korean War. Once the squadron was mobilized in May 1951 SAC reassigned its personnel to other units and the unit inactivated it two weeks later.

=== Reactivation in reserves ===
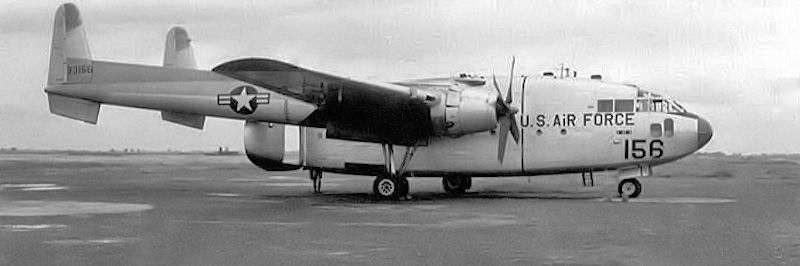
Fairchild C-119G Flying Boxcar

The squadron was reactivated in the reserve at Andrews Air Force Base, Maryland in May 1954 as the 756th Troop Carrier Squadron and began training with Curtiss C-46 Commandos. In the summer of 1956, the squadron participated in Operation Sixteen Ton during its two weeks of active duty training. Sixteen Ton was performed entirely by reserve troop carrier units and moved United States Coast Guard equipment From Floyd Bennett Naval Air Station to Isla Grande Airport in Puerto Rico and San Salvador in the Bahamas. After the success of Operation Sixteen Ton, the squadron began to use inactive duty training periods for Operation Swift Lift, transporting high priority cargo for the air force and Operation Ready Swap, transporting aircraft engines, between Air Materiel Command’s depots.

Meanwhile, The Joint Chiefs of Staff were pressuring the Air Force to provide more wartime airlift. About 150 Fairchild C-119 Flying Boxcars became available from the active force. Consequently, in 1957 the unit began conversion to the Flying Boxcar. At Andrews, the squadron trained with the 2259th Air Reserve Flying Center, but in 1958, the center was inactivated and some of its personnel were absorbed by the squadron. In place of active duty support for reserve units, ConAC adopted the Air Reserve Technician Program, in which a cadre of the unit consisted of full time personnel who were simultaneously civilian employees of the Air Force and held rank as members of the reserves. Another reorganization affected the unit in April 1959, when reserve units adopted the dual deputy organization. Under this plan, the 459th Troop Carrier Group was inactivated and the squadron reported directly to the 459th Troop Carrier Wing. All support organizations were located with the wing headquarters at Andrews.

During the first half of 1955, the Air Force began detaching Air Force Reserve squadrons from their parent wing locations to separate sites. The concept offered several advantages: communities were more likely to accept the smaller squadrons than the large wings and the location of separate squadrons in smaller population centers would facilitate recruiting and manning. Although the dispersal of flying units under the Detached Squadron Concept was not a problem when the entire wing was called to active service, mobilizing a single flying squadron and elements to support it proved difficult. This weakness was demonstrated in the partial mobilization of reserve units during the Berlin Crisis of 1961. To resolve this, ConAC determined to reorganize its reserve wings by establishing groups with support elements for each of its troop carrier squadrons at the start of 1962. This reorganization would facilitate mobilization of elements of wings in various combinations when needed. However, as this plan was entering its implementation phase, another partial mobilization occurred for the Cuban Missile Crisis, with the units being released on 22 November 1962. The formation of troop carrier groups was delayed until January 1963 for wings that had not been mobilized. At that time, the squadron was assigned to the 909th Troop Carrier Group, which was activated as the command element for the squadron, along with support elements for the 756th. The squadron continued airlift operations with the C-119 until 1966.

In October 1966, it began flying airlift missions worldwide with the Douglas C-124 Globemaster II. The squadron has also flown numerous humanitarian airlift missions. As the "Old Shaky"s were phased out of the inventory. the squadron converted to the Lockheed C-130 Hercules.

In October 1983, a military coup in Grenada overthrew the government. Shortly thereafter, the Organization of Eastern Caribbean States asked the United States to intervene and restore order. The US response, Operation Urgent Fury, began soon thereafter. The squadron flew C-130 missions transporting military equipment to the Caribbean, evacuating wounded and students, and reinforcing marines with army forces, until the island was turned over to a peace keeping force of Caribbean countries.

The squadron returned to the strategic airlift mission in 1986, trading in its Hercules aircraft for Lockheed C-141 Starlifters. In late 1989, the squadron participated in Operation Just Cause, the removal of Manuel Noriega as ruler of Panama. This was the largest air operation by the USAF since the Vietnam War. Squadron C-141s were part of the task force that staged elements of XVIII Airborne Corps from Pope Air Force Base to Charleston Air Force Base, then airlanded them in Panama. The squadron provided aircrews and planes to support Operation Desert Storm and Operations Northern and Southern Watch.

The squadron was redesignated in 2003 as an air refueling squadron and equipped with Boeing KC-135R Stratotankers. Squadron crews and planes have provided air refueling support for Operation Noble Eagle, Operation Enduring Freedom and Operation Iraqi Freedom.

== Lineage ==
- Constituted 756th Bombardment Squadron, Heavy on 19 May 1943

Activated on 1 July 1943
Inactivated on 28 August 1945

- Redesignated 756th Bombardment Squadron, Very Heavy on 11 March 1947

Activated in the reserve on 19 April 1947
Redesignated 756th Bombardment Squadron, Medium on 26 June 1949
Ordered to active service on 1 May 1951
Inactivated on 16 May 1951

- Redesignated 756th Troop Carrier Squadron, Medium on 6 May 1954

Activated in the reserve on 1 June 1954
Redesignated 756th Military Airlift Squadron on 1 October 1966
Redesignated 756th Tactical Airlift Squadron on 29 June 1971
Redesignated 756th Military Airlift Squadron on 1 July 1986
Redesignated 756th Airlift Squadron on 1 February 1992
Redesignated 756th Air Refueling Squadron on 1 October 2003

=== Assignments ===
- 459th Bombardment Group, 1 July 1943 – 28 August 1945
- 459th Bombardment Group, 19 April 1947
- Tenth Air Force, 26 June 1949
- Fifteenth Air Force, 21 July 1949
- Second Air Force, 1 April 1950 – 16 May 1951
- First Air Force, 1 June 1954
- 459th Troop Carrier Group, 26 January 1955
- 459th Troop Carrier Wing, 14 April 1959
- 909th Troop Carrier Group (later 909th Military Airlift Group, 909th Tactical Airlift Group), 17 January 1963
- 459th Tactical Airlift Wing (later 459th Military Airlift Wing, 459th Airlift Wing), 1 September 1975
- 459th Operations Group, 1 August 1992 – present

=== Stations ===
- Alamogordo Army Air Field, New Mexico, 1 July 1943
- Kearns Army Air Base, Utah, 2 September 1943
- Davis-Monthan Field, Arizona, 22 September 1943
- Westover Field, Massachusetts, 1 November 1943 – 2 January 1944
- Giulia Airfield, Italy, 12 February 1944 – c. 2 August 1945
- Sioux Falls Army Air Field, South Dakota, c. 14–28 August 1945
- Long Beach Army Air Field, California, 19 April 1947
- Smoky Hill Air Force Base, Kansas, 27 June 1949
- Barksdale Air Force Base, Louisiana, 10 October 1949 – 16 May 1951
- Andrews Air Force Base, Maryland, 1 June 1954 – present

=== Aircraft ===
- Consolidated B-24 Liberator (1943–1945)
- Curtiss C-46 Commando (1954–1957)
- Fairchild C-119 Flying Boxcar (1957–1966)
- Douglas C-124 Globemaster II (1966–1971)
- Lockheed C-130 Hercules (1971–1986)
- Lockheed C-141 Starlifter (1986–2003)
- Boeing KC-135 Stratotanker (2003 – present)

== Awards and campaigns ==
Award streamer	Award	Dates	Notes
	Distinguished Unit Citation	23 April 1944 Bad Vöslau, Austria	756th Bombardment Squadron
	Air Force Outstanding Unit Award	1 April 1971-31 March 1973	756th Military Airlift Squadron (later 756th Tactical Airlift Squadron)
	Air Force Outstanding Unit Award	1 November 1978-31 October 1980	756th Tactical Airlift Squadron
	Air Force Outstanding Unit Award	1 January 1982-31 December 1983	756th Tactical Airlift Squadron
	Air Force Outstanding Unit Award	1 January 1984-31 December 1985	756th Tactical Airlift Squadron
	Air Force Outstanding Unit Award	1 October 1991-30 September 1993	756th Military Airlift Squadron (later 756th Airlift Squadron)
	Air Force Outstanding Unit Award	1 October 1993-30 September 1995	756th Airlift Squadron
	Air Force Outstanding Unit Award	1 May 2002–30 April 2004	756th Airlift Squadron (later 756th Air Refueling Squadron)
	Air Force Outstanding Unit Award	1 January 2005–31 December 2006	756th Air Refueling Squadron
	Republic of Vietnam Gallantry Cross with Palm	1 October 1966-28 June 1971	756th Tactical Airlift Squadron

Campaign Streamer	Campaign	Dates	Notes
	Air Offensive, Europe	12 February 1944 – 5 June 1944	756th Bombardment Squadron
	Air Combat, EAME Theater	12 February 1944 – 11 May 1945	756th Bombardment Squadron
	Rome-Arno	12 February 1944 – 9 September 1944	756th Bombardment Squadron
	Central Europe	22 March 1944 – 21 May 1945	756th Bombardment Squadron
	Normandy	6 June 1944 – 24 July 1944	756th Bombardment Squadron
	Northern France	25 July 1944 – 14 September 1944	756th Bombardment Squadron
	Southern France	15 August 1944 – 14 September 1944	756th Bombardment Squadron
	North Apennines	10 September 1944 – 4 April 1945	756th Bombardment Squadron
	Rhineland	15 September 1944 – 21 March 1945	756th Bombardment Squadron
	Po Valley	3 April 1945 – 8 May 1945	756th Bombardment Squadron
	Urgent Fury	24 October-3 November 1983	756th Tactical Airlift Squadron, Grenada
	Just Cause	20 December 1989 – 31 January 1990	756th Military Airlift Squadron, Panama

== See also ==
- B-24 Liberator units of the United States Army Air Forces
- List of C-130 Hercules operators
