= 304th Air Division =

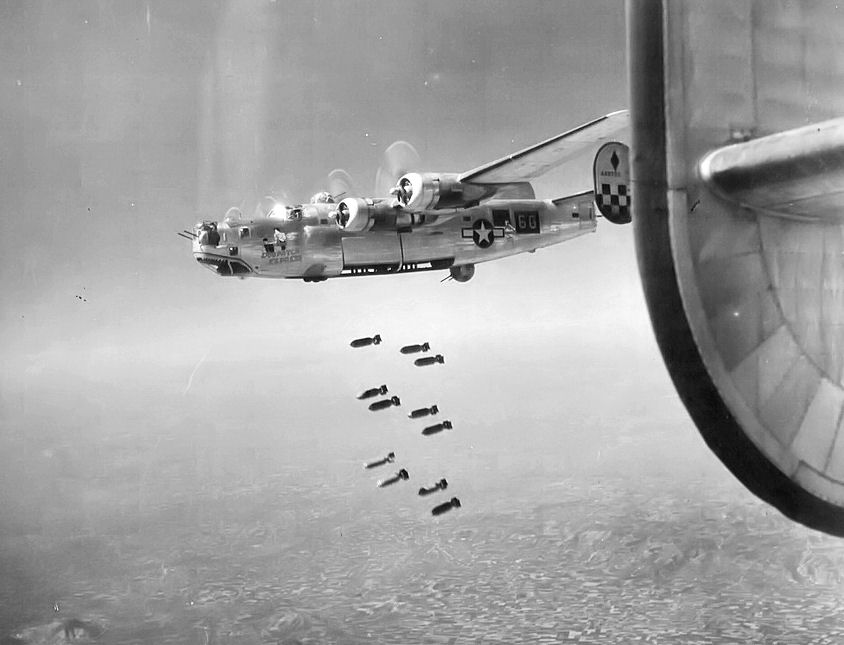
- Wing B-24 Liberator showing wing diamond on the tail (Note: Aircraft is Ford Motors built Consolidated B-24L-10-FO Liberator serial 44-49750 of the 756th Bombardment Squadron. This plane survived the war and was scrapped on 16 November 1945. Baugher, Joe (6 August 2023). "1944 USAF Serial Numbers". Joe Baugher.)
- Active: 1943–1945; 1947–1949
- Country: United States
- Branch: United States Air Force
- Role: Command of bombardment units
- Engagements: Mediterranean Theater of Operations

Commanders
- Col John K. Brown Jr.: c. 29 December 1943
- Brig Gen Fay R. Upthegrove: 27 January 1944
- Lt Col William R. Boutz (Note: The commander during the unit's years in the reserve is not known. AFHRA Factsheet.): 5 July 1945-1945

Insignia
- World War II tail and horizontal stabilizer marking: Diamond (white on camouflaged aircraft, black on unpainted aircraft)

The 304th Air Division is an inactive United States Air Force organization. Its last assignment was with Fourth Air Force at Long Beach Airport, California, where it was inactivated in June 1949.

The division was initially activated as the 304th Bombardment Wing at Cerignola Airfield, Italy in December 1943. It was assigned four Consolidated B-24 Liberator bombardment groups the following month and conducted strategic bombing from bases in Italy against Germany and occupied Europe. The wing's groups were occasionally diverted to interdiction targets to support ground operations. After VE Day, the wing returned to the United States and was inactivated. It was activated as a reserve unit in 1947.

== History ==
=== World War II ===
The personnel that would form the cadre for the wing were assembled in early December 1943 at Topeka Army Air Field, Kansas for shipment overseas. Upon their arrival in Italy, the 304th Bombardment Wing was activated at Cerignola Airfield, Italy in late December, although its personnel were located with Fifteenth Air Force at Bari at the time and did not arrive at the wing's permanent station until 4 January 1944. It was assigned its first combat units in late January, although not all of them were in place until February, and none had combat experience. The wing and its groups were located at various bases in the Foggia Airfield Complex in Apulia. The wing's first combat mission, against an airfield near Orvieto, was flown in February.

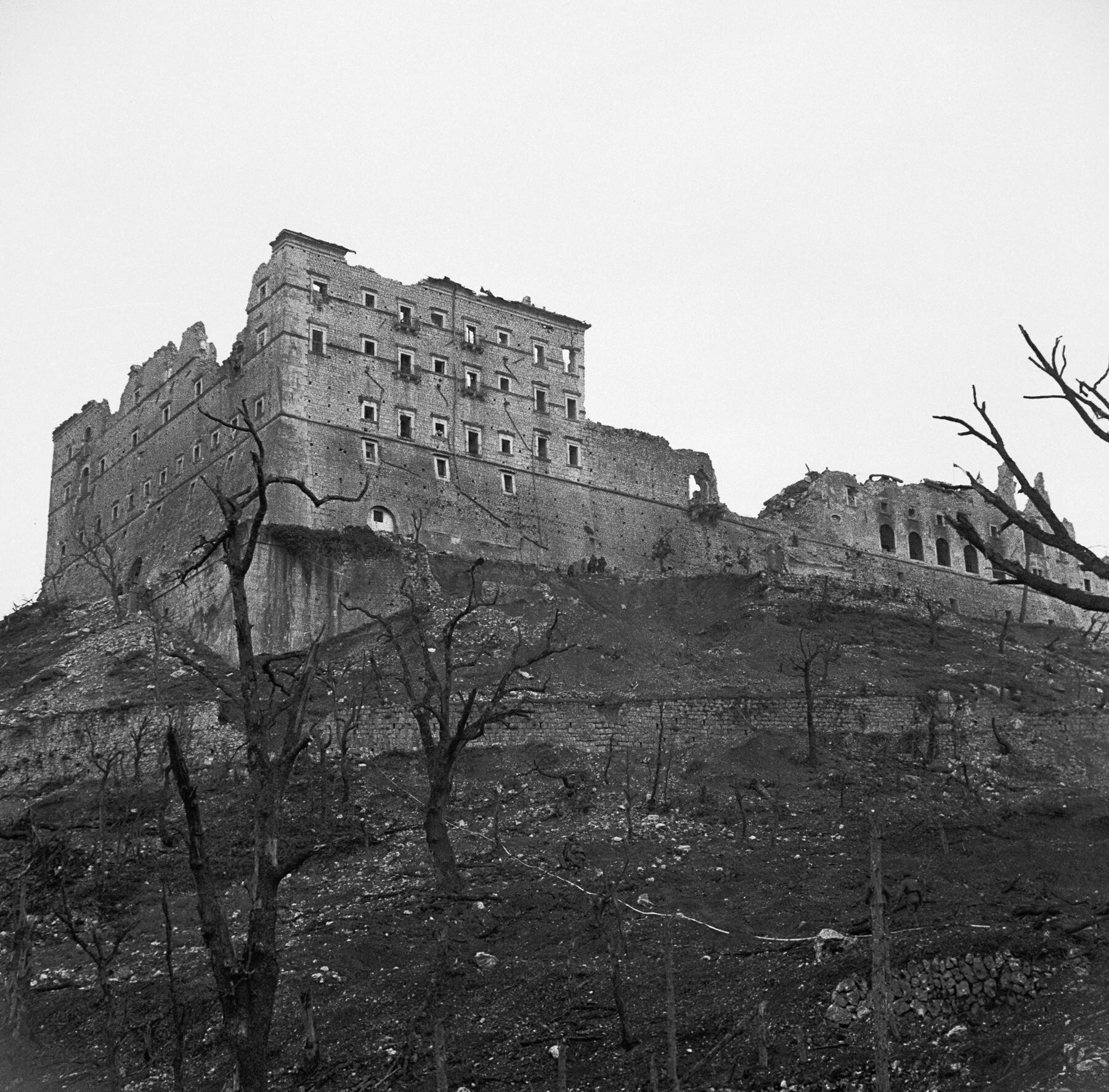
The ruined monastery at Monte Cassino in May 1944

The 304th's primary mission was the strategic bombardment of enemy occupied Europe. Targets included harbors, marshalling yards, airfields, bridges, industrial areas, and troop concentrations in Italy, Austria, Germany, Yugoslavia, Czechoslovakia, and Greece. In May 1944, some subordinate units began an intensive bombing campaign against enemy oil resources, which included refineries at Ploiești, Romania, and oil and storage plants in Austria, Germany, and Hungary.

The wing's groups were occasionally assigned interdiction missions. These included the Battle of Anzio in the spring of 1944; the subsequent Battle of Monte Cassino and the drive to Rome; Operation Dragoon, the invasion of southern France in July and August 1944; and the advance against German troops in northern Italy. Attacks in Hungary, Romania and Bulgaria were made to weaken German forces opposing the Soviet advance in Eastern Europe. These attacks also had the strategic objective of causing these Axis nations to withdraw from the war.

The wing flew its last combat mission in April 1945. Following VE Day, The wing began carrying food and other supplies to airfields near Udine. In June the wing concentrated on preparing its personnel and equipment for return to the United States. By the end of the month, most planes and crews had departed Italy, and all but one of the wing's groups returned to the United States by July 1945, while only three or four planes remained behind in Italy. The wing headquarters returned in September and was inactivated at the port of embarkation.

=== Air Force reserves ===
The 304th was reactivated as a reserve unit under Air Defense Command at Long Beach Municipal Airport, California in April 1947 and assigned two reserve bombardment groups, which were activated at Long Beach the same day. The two groups were designated as very heavy groups and nominally were Boeing B-29 Superfortress units. However, it does not appear that the groups were equipped during that period.

In 1948 Continental Air Command assumed the responsibility for managing reserve and Air National Guard units. As the regular Air Force reorganized under the wing base organization, wings became single base organizations including both support and operational units. The 304th, which commanded two operational units was, therefore, renamed the 304th Air Division.

President Truman's reduced 1949 defense budget also required reductions in the number of units in the Air Force, The Division was inactivated on 29 June 1949 and most of its personnel transferred to the 448th and 452d Bombardment Wings, which were activated the same day as light bomber units.

== Lineage ==
- Established as the 304th Bombardment Wing (Heavy) on 7 December 1943

Activated on 29 December 1943
Redesignated 304th Bombardment Wing, Heavy on 4 May 1945
Inactivated on 13 October 1945

- Redesignated 304th Bombardment Wing, Very Heavy on 11 March 1947

Activated in the Reserves on 19 April 1947
Redesignated 304th Air Division, Bombardment on 16 April 1948
Inactivated on 27 June 1949

=== Assignments ===
- Fifteenth Air Force, 29 December 1943 – 26 September 1945
- Army Service Forces, Port of Embarkation, 26 September – 13 October 1945
- Fourth Air Force, 19 April 1947 – 27 June 1949

=== Stations ===
- Cerignola Airfield, Italy, 29 December 1943 – 26 September 1945
- Camp Kilmer, New Jersey, 12 – 13 October 1945
- Long Beach Municipal Airport, California, 19 April 1947 – 27 June 1949

=== Components ===
Groups

- 448th Bombardment Group: 19 April 1947 – 27 June 1949
- 452d Bombardment Group: 19 April 1947 – 27 June 1949
- 454th Bombardment Group: 25 January 1944 – c. 19 July 1945

San Giovanni Airfield, Italy

- 455th Bombardment Group: 25 January 1944 – 9 September 1945

San Giovanni Airfield, Italy

- 456th Bombardment Group: 25 January 1944 – c. 18 June 1945

Stornara Airfield, Italy

- 459th Bombardment Group: 25 January 1944 – c. 7 July 1945, 19 April 1947 – 27 June 1949

Giulia Airfield, Italy after February 1944

=== Aircraft ===
- Consolidated B-24 Liberator, 1944–1945

=== Campaigns ===
| Campaign Streamer | Campaign | Dates | Notes |
|---|---|---|---|
| | Naples-Foggia | 29 December 1943 – 21 January 1944 | 304th Bombardment Wing |
| | Rome-Arno | 22 January 1944 – 9 September 1944 | 304th Bombardment Wing |

== See also ==
- B-24 Liberator units of the United States Army Air Forces
- List of United States Air Force air divisions
