= 812th Fighter-Bomber Squadron =

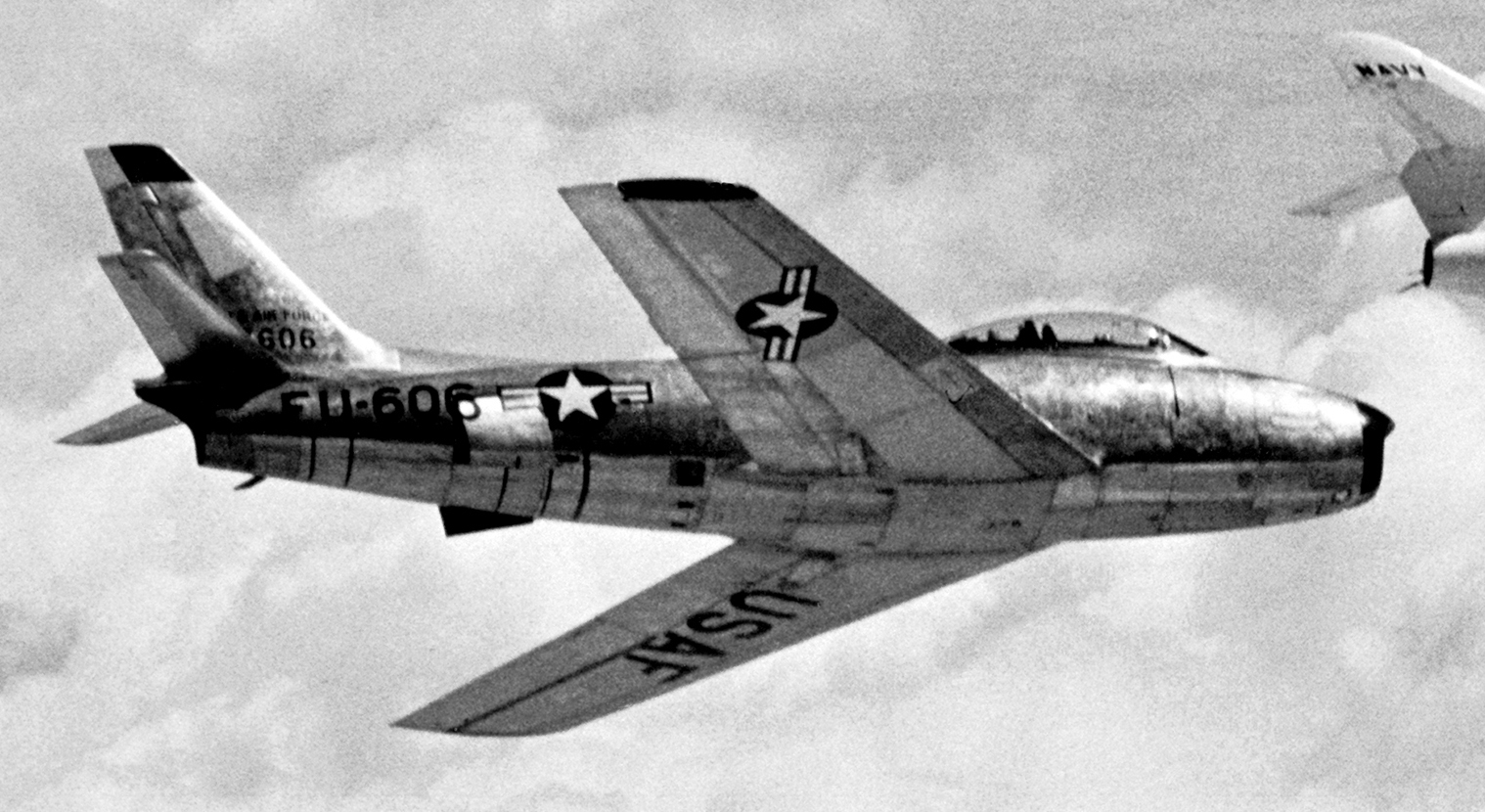
- F-86 Sabre, last plane flown by the 812th
- Active: 1943–1945; 1947–1949; 1952; 1955–1957
- Country: United States
- Branch: United States Air Force
- Role: Fighter-Bomber
- Engagements: European Theater of Operations
- Decorations: Distinguished Unit Citation

Insignia
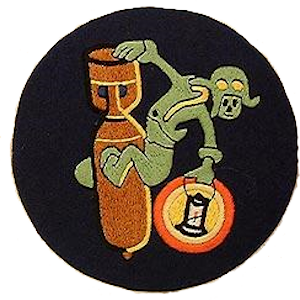
- 812th Fighter-Bomber Squadron emblem (Note: Approved 17 October 1944. Description: On a dark blue violet disc, a light green gremlin-like figure, wearing aviator's helmet and goggles, edged black, highlighted yellow, grasping with the right hand the tail fin of a large tan aerial bomb, edged black, highlighted yellow, and having feet entwined about middle of bomb, while holding a lantern in the right [sic] hand, proper with glow of yellow, orange and dark red concentric circles.)

The 812th Fighter-Bomber Squadron is an inactive United States Air Force unit. Its last assignment was with 482d Fighter-Bomber Group stationed at Dobbins Air Force Base, Georgia.

During World War II, the squadron was activated in England as the 812th Bombardment Squadron (Pathfinder). Its Boeing B-17 Flying Fortress aircraft were equipped with first generation radars to guide other bombardment units to targets obscured by cloud cover over Occupied Europe and Nazi Germany, earning a Distinguished Unit Citation in January 1944. In March 1944, it was removed from combat to focus on training pathfinder aircrews and develop tactics, although its developmental work occasionally required it to fly combat missions. After V-E Day, the squadron returned to the United States and was inactivated.

The squadron became a reserve organization, serving as a bombardment unit from 1947–1949 and briefly as an airlift unit in 1952. It became a fighter unit in 1955. It was inactivated in 1957 when air force reserve fighter units became troop carrier organizations.

== History ==
=== World War II ===
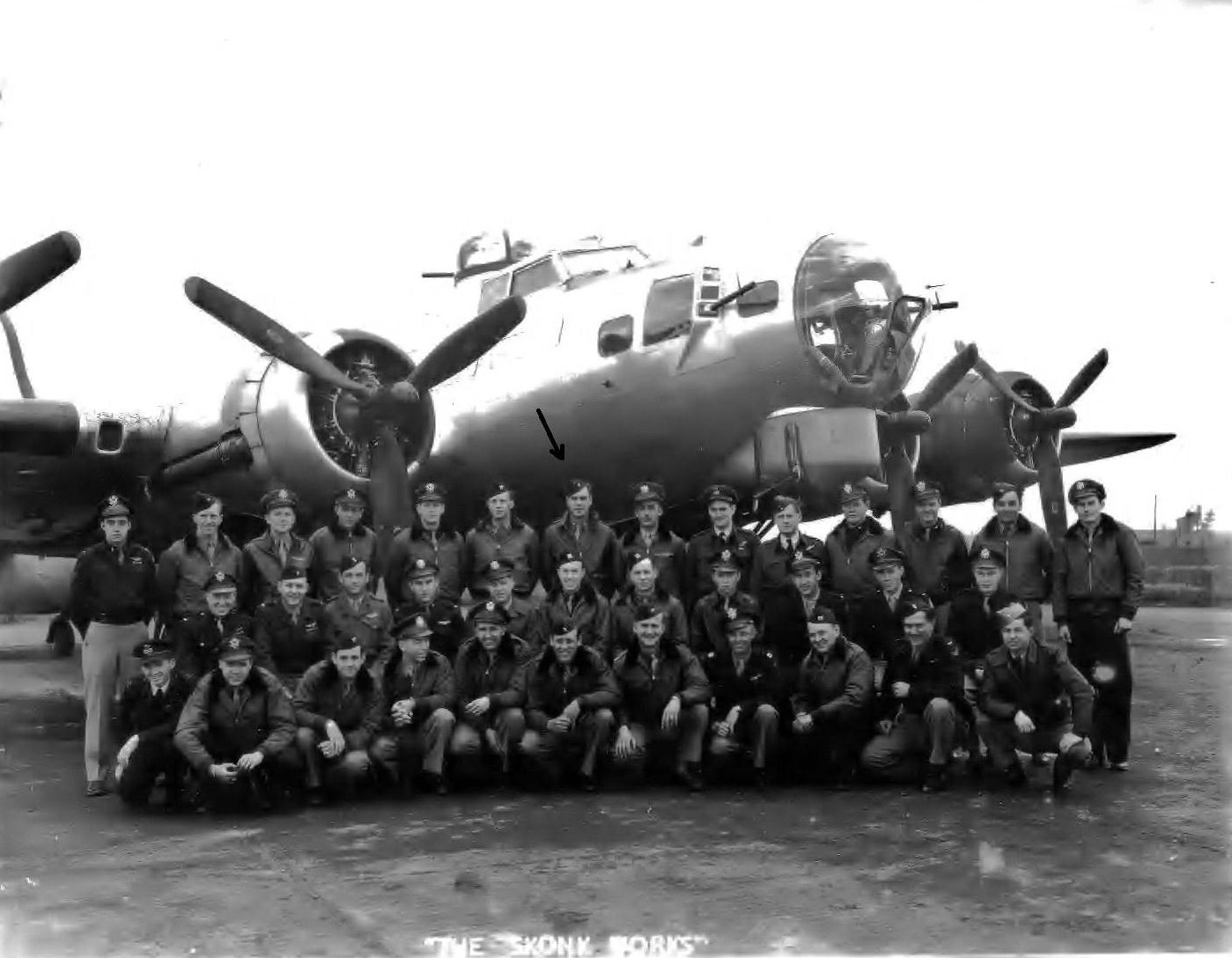
B-17 and 482d Bombardment Group crews in 1944

VIII Bomber Command's early operations in 1942 and 1943 had shown it that weather conditions in the European Theater of Operations were such that to conduct a successful bombing campaign, the command would need to have the capability of bombing through overcast. Following the Royal Air Force's example, Eighth Air Force formed a group with specially selected aircrews that would act as "Pathfinders", using radar-equipped bombers to lead each wing's bomber formation. The squadron was activated as the 812th Bombardment Squadron, one of the two Boeing B-17 Flying Fortress squadrons of the 482d Bombardment Group on 20 August 1943. (Note: The group also had one squadron flying Consolidated B-24 Liberators. Maurer, Combat Squadrons, p. 765.)

Squadron aircrews were specially selected from all VIII Bomber Command groups. In addition to its combat mission of acting as Pathfinders, the squadron's mission was to continue the development of tactics and techniques for the use of radar navigation and bombing systems and training crews of other bomber units as Pathfinders. The squadron flew its first mission on 27 September 1943 against port facilities at Emden, although it did not fly as a unit. Rather, its crews and airplanes dispersed to bases of 1st and 3d Bombardment Divisions to lead other group formations. The squadron earned a Distinguished Unit Citation for an 11 January 1944 mission leading bombers to targets such as aircraft factories in central Germany. Although weather prevented effective fighter protection against enemy aircraft, the group bombed assigned targets and destroyed many enemy airplanes. During Big Week attacks it led raids on aircraft factories at Gotha, Braunschweig and Schweinfurt.

In addition to flying pathfinder missions, the squadron trained crews from other groups of VIII Bomber Command. Although it was formally withdrawn from combat in March 1944, it continued to fly occasional missions to test tactics and equipment. In addition, the squadron performed radar photographic mapping of parts of France, the Low Countries, and Germany for training and briefing combat crews. It changed the "Pathfinder" in its name to "Heavy" in November 1944.

The squadron's aircraft left England for the United States between 27 and 30 May 1945. The ground echelon sailed on the RMS Queen Elizabeth from Gourock, Scotland on 24 June 1945. The squadron regrouped at Victorville Army Air Field, California on 5 July 1945, but was inactivated on 1 September 1945.

=== Reserve operations ===
The squadron was redesignated the 812th Bombardment Squadron, Very Heavy and activated in the reserve at New Orleans Municipal Airport on 9 September 1947. Although nominally a bomber unit, it is not clear whether the squadron had any operational aircraft assigned, or if it was fully manned. The 812th was inactivated when Continental Air Command, which was responsible for training reserve and Air National Guard units, reorganized its reserve units under the wing base organization system in June 1949. President Truman's 1949 defense budget also required reductions in the number of units in the Air Force, and the 812th was inactivated and not replaced as reserve flying operations at New Orleans Municipal Airport ceased.

All reserve combat organizations had been mobilized for the Korean War, and it was not until the summer of 1952 that reserve units again began receiving aircraft. The squadron was redesignated the 812th Troop Carrier Squadron and activated at Miami International Airport, Florida on 14 June 1952, when the 482d Troop Carrier Wing replaced the 906th Reserve Training Wing, which had supervised reserve operations there since 1951. The squadron trained with Curtiss C-46 Commandos under the supervision of the 2585th Air Force Reserve Training Center. In December 1953, the 435th Troop Carrier Wing at Miami was released from active duty and assumed the mission, personnel and equipment of the 482d Wing. In this reorganization, the 76th Troop Carrier Squadron took over the mission, personnel and aircraft of the 812th, which was inactivated. (Note: Although it had been mobilized in 1951, the 435th Wing remained in Miami as a training organization for C-46 crews deploying to the Far East. Ravenstein, p. 231. When it was released from active duty on 1 December 1952, its resources were taken over by the newly-activated 456th Troop Carrier Wing, while it took over those of the 482d. Ravenstein, pp. 231, 251, 268.)

In the early 1950s, there were six reserve pilot training wings with no mobilization mission. On 18 May 1955, they were discontinued and replaced by operational wings. In this reorganization, the 94th Tactical Reconnaissance Wing at Dobbins Air Force Base, Georgia moved on paper to Scott Air Force Base to replace the 8711th Pilot Training Wing. The 812th, now designated the 812th Fighter-Bomber Squadron, took over the personnel and equipment of the 94th Wing's operational squadrons at Dobbins.

The squadron initially flew Lockheed F-80 Shooting Star fighters, and trainers that it inherited from the 94th Wing. Later that year, it began to equip with the Republic F-84 Thunderjet. Despite its fighter bomber designation, it was designed to augment active duty interceptor squadrons in performing air defense missions. In 1957, the squadron began to replace its Thunderjets with North American F-86 Sabres. However, The Joint Chiefs of Staff were pressuring the Air Force to provide more wartime airlift. At the same time, about 150 Fairchild C-119 Flying Boxcars became available from the active force. Consequently, in November 1956 the Air Force directed Continental Air Command to convert three reserve fighter bomber wings to troop carrier units in 1957. Sabre training ended, and instead Fairchild C-119 Flying Boxcars arrived in October 1957. In November the squadron was inactivated and its troop carrier assets were transferred to the 700th Troop Carrier Squadron, which was simultaneously activated at Dobbins.

== Lineage ==
- Constituted as the 812th Bombardment Squadron (Pathfinder) on 10 August 1943

Activated on 20 August 1943
Redesignated 812th Bombardment Squadron, Heavy on 11 November 1944
Inactivated on 1 September 1945

- Redesignated 812th Bombardment Squadron, Very Heavy on 13 August 1947

Activated in the reserve on 9 September 1947
Inactivated on 27 June 1949

- Redesignated 812th Troop Carrier Squadron, Medium on 26 May 1952

Activated in the reserve on 14 June 1952
Inactivated on 1 December 1952

- Redesignated 812th Fighter-Bomber Squadron on 12 April 1955

Activated in the reserve on 18 May 1955
Inactivated on 16 November 1957

=== Assignments ===
- 482d Bombardment Group, 20 August 1943 – 1 September 1945
- 482d Bombardment Group, 9 September 1947 – 27 June 1949
- 482d Troop Carrier Group, 14 June-1 December 1952
- 482d Fighter-Bomber Group, 18 May 1955 – 16 November 1957

=== Stations ===
- RAF Alconbury, England, 20 August 1943 – June 1945
- Victorville Army Air Field, California, July-1 September 1945
- New Orleans Municipal Airport, Louisiana, 9 September 1947 – 27 June 1949
- Miami International Airport, Florida, 14 June-1 December 1952
- Dobbins Air Force Base, Georgia, 18 May 1955 – 16 November 1957

=== Aircraft ===
- Boeing B-17 Flying Fortress, 1943–1945
- Curtiss C-46 Commando, 1952
- Lockheed F-80 Shooting Star, 1955
- Republic F-84 Thunderstreak, 1955–1957
- North American T-28 Trojan, 1955–1957
- Lockheed T-33 T-Bird, 1955–1957
- North American F-86 Sabre, 1957
- Fairchild C-119 Flying Boxcar, 1957

=== Awards and campaigns ===
Award streamer	Award	Dates	Notes
	Distinguished Unit Citation	11 January 1944	Germany, 812th Bombardment Squadron

Campaign Streamer	Campaign	Dates	Notes
	Air Offensive, Europe	20 August 1943 – 5 June 1944	812th Bombardment Squadron
	Normandy	6 June 1944 – 24 July 1944	812th Bombardment Squadron
	Northern France	25 July 1944 – 14 September 1944	812th Bombardment Squadron
	Rhineland	15 September 1944 – 21 March 1945	812th Bombardment Squadron
	Central Europe	22 March 1944 – 21 May 1945	812th Bombardment Squadron
