= 918th Armament Systems Group =

918th Armament Systems Group

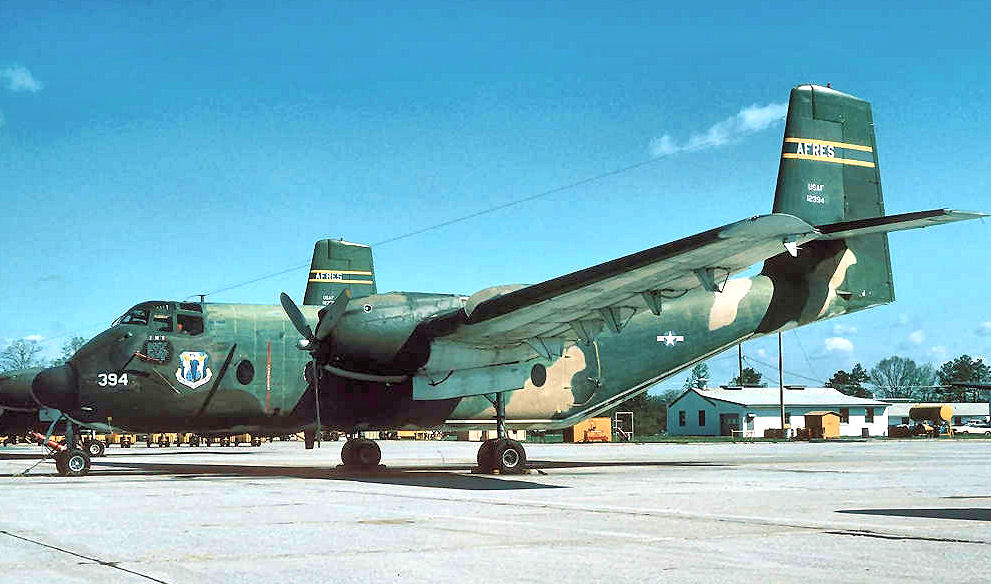
- Group de Havilland Canada C-7 Caribou about 1973
- Active: 1963-1975; 2006-
- Country: United States
- Branch: United States Air Force
- Role: Systems development
- Part of: Air Force Materiel Command
- Garrison/HQ: Eglin Air Force Base

The 918th Armament Systems Group is a United States Air Force unit, stationed at Eglin Air Force Base, Florida.

The group was formerly the 918th Tactical Airlift Group, which was last active with the 94th Tactical Airlift Wing, based at Dobbins Air Force Base, Georgia.

== History ==
=== Need for reserve troop carrier groups ===
During the first half of 1955, the Air Force began detaching Air Force Reserve squadrons from their parent wing locations to separate sites. The concept offered several advantages. Communities were more likely to accept the smaller squadrons than the large wings and the location of separate squadrons in smaller population centers would facilitate recruiting and manning. Continental Air Command (ConAC)'s plan called for placing Air Force Reserve units at fifty-nine installations located throughout the United States. When these relocations were completed in 1959, reserve wing headquarters and wing support elements would typically be on one base, along with one (or in some cases two) of the wing's flying squadrons, while the remaining flying squadrons were spread over thirty-five Air Force, Navy and civilian airfields under what was called the Detached Squadron Concept.

Although this dispersal was not a problem when the entire wing was called to active service, mobilizing a single flying squadron and elements to support it proved difficult. This weakness was demonstrated in the partial mobilization of reserve units during the Berlin Crisis of 1961 To resolve this, at the start of 1962, ConAC determined to reorganize its reserve wings by establishing groups with support elements for each of its troop carrier squadrons. This reorganization would facilitate mobilization of elements of wings in various combinations when needed. However, as this plan was entering its implementation phase, another partial mobilization occurred for the Cuban Missile Crisis, with the units being released on 22 November 1962. The formation of troop carrier groups occurred in January 1963 for units that had not been mobilized, but was delayed until February for those that had been.

=== Activation of 918th Troop Carrier Group ===
As a result, the 918th Troop Carrier Group was established at Dobbins Air Force Base, Georgia on 11 February 1963 as the headquarters for the 700th Troop Carrier Squadron, which had been stationed there since November 1957. Along with group headquarters, a Combat Support Squadron, Materiel Squadron and a Tactical Infirmary were organized to support the 700th.

The group's mission was to organize, recruit and train Air Force Reserve personnel in the tactical airlift of airborne forces, their equipment and supplies and delivery of these forces and materials by airdrop, landing or cargo extraction systems. The group was equipped with Fairchild C-123 Providers for Tactical Air Command airlift operations.

The 918th was one of three groups assigned to the 445th Troop Carrier Wing in 1963, the others being the 919th and 920th Troop Carrier Groups at Memphis Municipal Airport, Tennessee.

Transferred from TAC to Military Air Transport Service (later Military Airlift Command) control, being upgraded to a Douglas C-124 Globemaster II long range intercontinental transport group in 1965. Operated aircraft on flights to Europe, Bermuda, and Puerto Rico. Supported Vietnam War, by the end of 1966, the unit had flown several missions into Tan Son Nhut Air Base in South Vietnam. Supported airlift to Japan and South Korea in 1968 in support of the Pueblo incident.

In April 1971 its parent 445th MAG was inactivated at Dobbins, and was transferred to control of the 459th Tactical Airlift Wing at Andrews Air Force Base, although the group remained at Dobbins, becoming the host unit at the base. It became part of the new Reserve 94th Tactical Airlift Wing at Dobbins in July 1972. The C-124s were retired in 1972 and the group received de Havilland Canada C-7 Caribou light transports which were withdrawn from service in the Vietnam War. Operated the C-7s until the group was inactivated in 1975, personnel and equipment being assigned to the host 94th Tactical Airlift Wing.

=== Systems management ===
In May 2006, the group was redesignated the 918th Armament Systems Group and activated at Eglin Air Force Base, Florida as an element of the 308th Armament Systems Wing.

== Lineage ==
- Established as the 918th Troop Carrier Group, Assault and activated on 15 January 1963 (not organized)

Organized in the Reserve on 11 February 1963
Redesignated 918th Troop Carrier Group, Heavy on 8 July 1965
Redesignated 918th Air Transport Group, Heavy on 1 December 1965
Redesignated 918th Military Airlift Group on 1 January 1966
Redesignated 918th Tactical Airlift Group on 29 June 1971
Inactivated on 1 September 1975

- Redesignated 918th Armament Systems Group on 3 May 2006

Activated on 15 May 2006

=== Assignments ===
- Continental Air Command, 15 January 1963 (not organized)
- 445th Troop Carrier Wing (later, 445th Air Transport Wing), 11 February 1963 (attached to 459th Military Airlift Wing after 1 April 1971)
- 459th Military Airlift Wing (later Tactical Airlift Wing), 21 April 1971
- 94th Tactical Airlift Wing, 1 July 1972 – 1 September 1975
- 308th Armament Systems Wing, 15 May 2006 – present

=== Components ===
- 700th Troop Carrier Squadron (later 700th Air Transport Squadron, 700th Military Airlift Squadron, 700th Tactical Airlift Squadron), 11 February 1963 – 1 September 1975

=== Stations ===
- Dobbins Air Force Base, Georgia, 11 February 1963 – 1 September 1975
- Eglin Air Force Base, Florida, 15 May 2006 -

=== Aircraft ===
- Fairchild C-123 Provider, 1963-1965
- Douglas C-124 Globemaster II, 1965-1972
- de Havilland Canada C-7A Caribou, 1972-1975
