= 25th Fighter-Bomber Squadron =

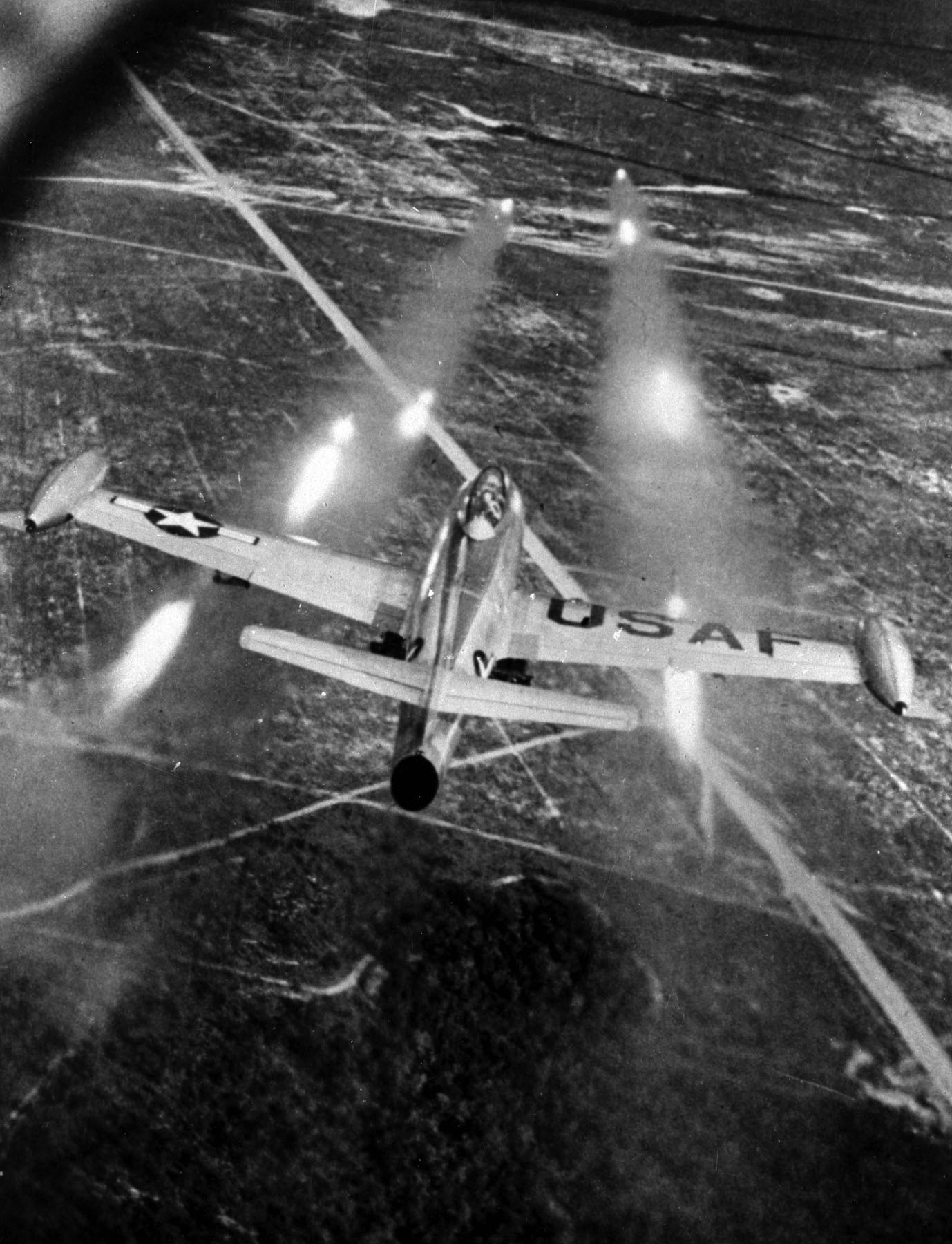
- F-84E Thunderjet launching rockets
- Active: 1942-1944; 1949–1951; 1952-1957
- Country: United States
- Branch: United States Air Force
- Role: Fighter-bomber

Insignia
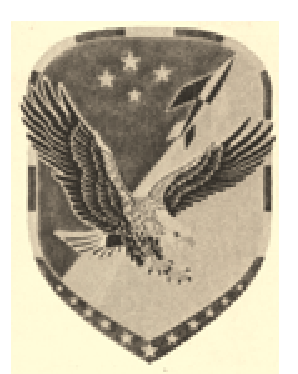
- 25th Fighter-Bomber Squadron emblem (Note: Approved 30 November 1956. Description: A shield per bend sinister azure and sky blue. a stylized jet interceptor aircraft, red and white counterchanged, flying to sinister chief with white power stream trailing to dexter base, in chief four stars of the last [color]; the shield edged with a diminutive compony border of fourteen divisions azure and white counterchanged, the base area of the compony border a wider division, azure marked with eleven white stars; superimposed over the center area of the shield an American Eagle flying downward; in his natural colors, brown body, white head and tail and white detail, beak and feet golden yellow.)

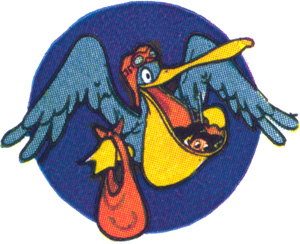
- 25 Troop Carrier Sq emblem

The 25th Fighter-Bomber Squadron is an inactive United States Air Force unit. It was organized in February 1942 as the 25th Transport Squadron and served as a training unit for I Troop Carrier Command until disbanding in a general reorganization of Army Air Forces training units in 1944. The squadron was reconstituted in the reserves in 1949 and served until May 1951, when it was called to active duty for the Korean War. It was then inactivated, and its personnel were assigned to other units. When the reserves reactivated their operational units in 1952, it was activated as the 25th Fighter-Bomber Squadron. When the reserve fighter mission was concentrated in the Air National Guard in 1957, the squadron was inactivated and its assets transferred to elements of the 94th Troop Carrier Wing

== History ==
=== World War II ===
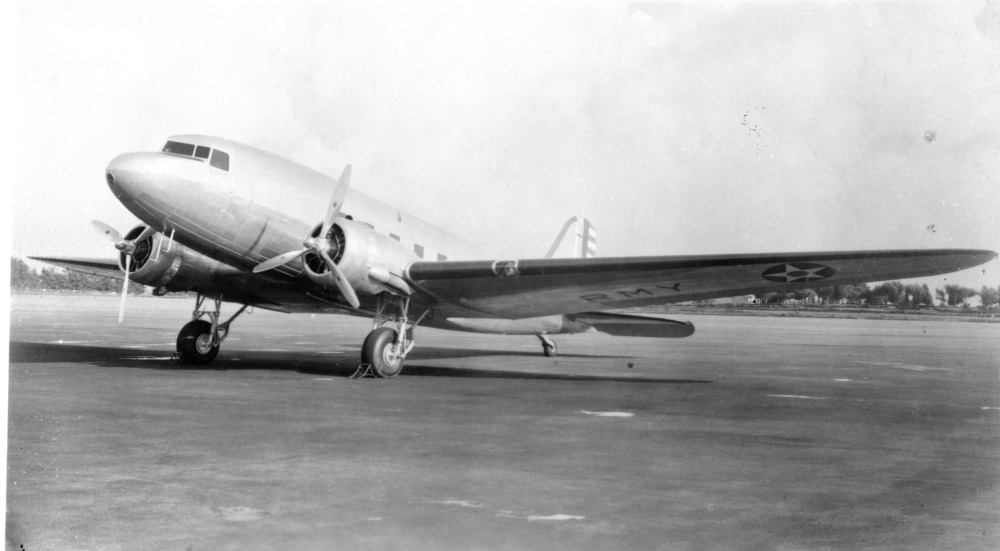
Douglas C-49

The squadron was first activated at Daniel Field, Georgia on 1 February 1942 as one of the five original squadrons of the 89th Transport Group. The squadron moved several times during the spring and summer of 1942. It was equipped with a variety of Douglas DC-3 airliners that had been impressed into military service and designated C-49 or C-50 and with Douglas C-53 Skytroopers.

The squadron's initial mission was transition training for qualified pilots who had not flown the Douglas transports. In July 1942, the squadron was redesignated the 25th Troop Carrier Squadron, but its mission remained the same. The squadron finally moved its operations to Del Valle Airfield, Texas in December 1942. In 1943, it standardized its equipment with the Douglas C-47 Skytrain replacing its previous mixture of Douglas transports.

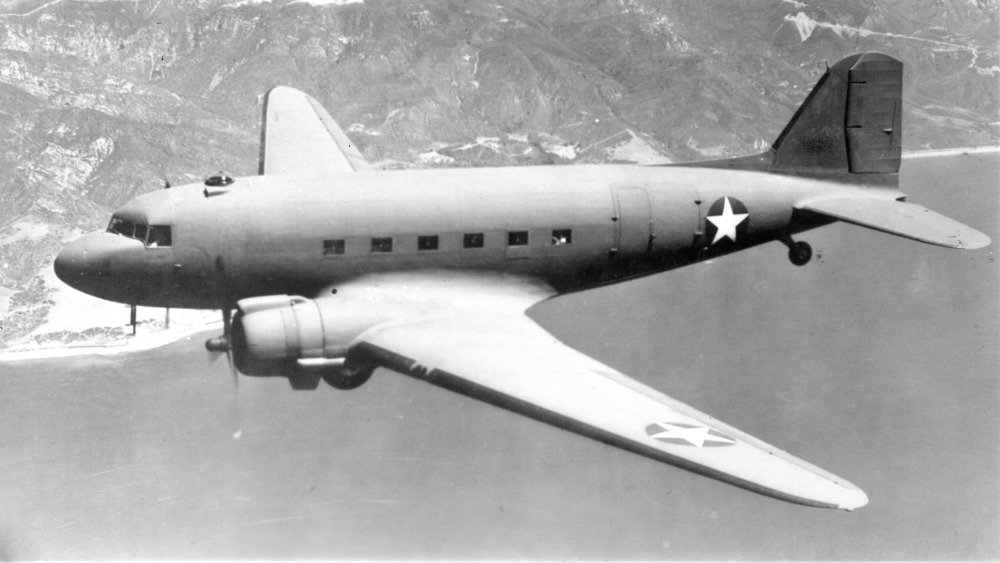
Douglas C-47 Skytrain

By February 1944 most combat units had been activated and almost three quarters of them had deployed overseas. With the exception of special programs, like forming Boeing B-29 Superfortress units, training “fillers” for existing units became more important. Reflecting this change, the squadron mission changed in March 1944, when it became a Replacement Training Unit (RTU). The RTU program used oversized units to train individual pilots and aircrews.

However, the Army Air Forces (AAF) was finding that standard military units like the 25th, whose manning was based on relatively inflexible tables of organization were not well adapted to the training mission, even more so to the replacement mission. Accordingly, the AAF adopted a more functional system in which each base was organized into a separate numbered unit. The 89th Group, along with its operational squadrons and support units at what was now Bergstrom Field were disbanded and their personnel and equipment were transferred to the new 807th AAF Base Unit (Combat Crew Training School, Troop Carrier).

=== Reserve operations ===
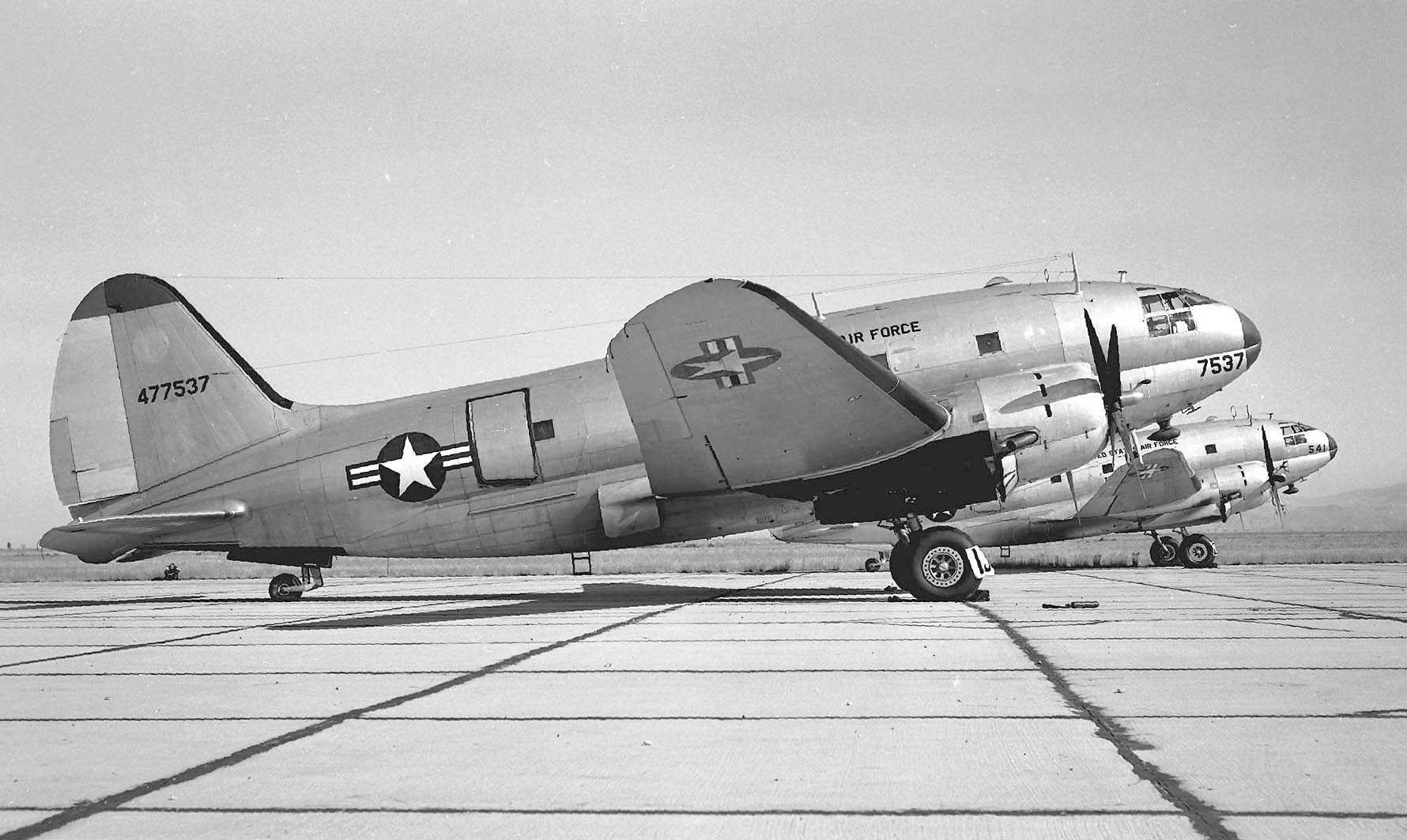
Curtiss C-46D

The squadron was reconstituted in 1949 and activated in the reserves at Hanscom Airport on 27 July 1949 as Continental Air Command reorganized its operational units under the Wing Base Organization. The squadron was again assigned to the 89th Group, which under the new organization, formed part of the 89th Troop Carrier Wing, which assumed the assets of the inactivating 310th Bombardment Group.

At Hanscom, squadron training was supervised by the 2234th Air Force Reserve Training Center and the squadron was only manned at 25% of normal strength. Although the squadron operated a variety of trainers, its primary mission aircraft was the Curtiss C-46 Commando. All reserve combat and corollary units were mobilized for the Korean War. The 25th was called up on 1 May 1951. Squadron personnel were used as fillers to bring other units up to strength and unit aircraft were distributed to other organizations as well. The squadron was inactivated on 10 May.

The reserve mobilization for the Korean War, however, had left the reserve without aircraft, and the reserves did not receive aircraft until July 1952. In June 1952, the squadron, now the 25th Fighter-Bomber Squadron, was once again activated at Hanscom. All reserve fighter bomber Units, however were assigned an air defense role. The squadron was gained by Air Defense Command (ADC) upon mobilization. ADC required these squadrons to be designed to augment active duty squadrons capable of performing air defense missions for an indefinite period after mobilization independently of their parent wing. The squadron equipped with Lockheed F-80 Shooting Stars in 1953 to perform this mission. The squadron also continued to operate trainers until the mid 1950s, when it began doing all its flying in tactical aircraft.

By 1955, the squadron had begun to re-equip with Republic F-84 Thunderjets. However, the Joint Chiefs of Staff were pressuring the Air Force to provide more wartime airlift. At the same time, about 150 Fairchild C-119 Flying Boxcars became available from the active force. In addition, within the Air Staff was a recommendation that the reserve fighter mission given to the Air National Guard and replaced by the troop carrier mission. Consequently, in November 1956 the Air Force directed Continental Air Command to convert three reserve fighter bomber wings to the troop carrier mission by September 1957. The squadron had just begun upgrading to the North American F-86 Sabre, when it was inactivated on 16 November 1957, and most of its assets were transferred to elements of the 94th Troop Carrier Wing, which was simultaneously activated.

== Lineage ==
- Constituted as the 25th Transport Squadron on 19 January 1942

Activated on 1 February 1942
Redesignated 25th Troop Carrier Squadron on 4 July 1942
Disbanded on 14 April 1944
Reconstituted as the 25th Troop Carrier Squadron, Medium on 10 May 1949
Activated in the reserve on 27 June 1949
Ordered into active service on 1 May 1951
Inactivated on 10 May 1951
Redesignated 25th Fighter-Bomber Squadron on 6 May 1952
Activated on in the reserve on 14 June 1952
Inactivated on 16 November 1957

=== Assignments ===
- 89th Transport Group (later 89th Troop Carrier Group), 1 February 1942 – 14 April 1944
- 89th Troop Carrier Group, 27 June 1949 – 10 May 1951
- 89th Fighter-Bomber Group, 14 June 1952 – 16 November 1957

=== Stations ===
- Daniel Field, Georgia, 1 February 1942
- Harding Field, Louisiana, 8 March 1942
- Camp Williams Army Air Field, Wisconsin, 22 June 1942
- Sedalia Army Air Field, Missouri, 2 September 1942
- Del Valle Airfield (later Bergstrom Field), 19 December 1942 – 14 April 1944
- Hanscom Airport (later Bedford Air Field, Hanscom Field), Massachusetts, 27 June 1949 – 10 May 1951
- Hanscom Field (later Laurence G. Hanscom Field), Massachusetts, 14 June 1952 – 16 November 1957

=== Aircraft ===
- Douglas DC-3 (as C-49, C-50 and C-53), 1942–1943
- Douglas C-47 Skytrain, 1943–1944, 1949-1951
- Beechcraft C-45 Expeditor, 1949-1950
- Curtiss C-46 Commando, 1949-1951, 1952
- North American T-6 Texan, 1949-1950, 1952-1954
- Beechcraft T-7 Navigator, 1949-1951
- Beechcraft T-11 Kansan, 1949-1951
- North American T-28 Trojan, 1953-1956
- Lockheed F-80C Shooting Star, 1953-1957
- Republic F-84E Thunderjet, 1955
- North American F-86 Sabre, 1957

=== Campaign ===
Campaign Streamer	Campaign	Dates	Notes
	American Theater without inscription	2 March 1942 – 14 April 1944	25th Transport Squadron (later 25th Troop Carrier Squadron)
