= 700th Airlift Squadron =

700th Airlift Squadron

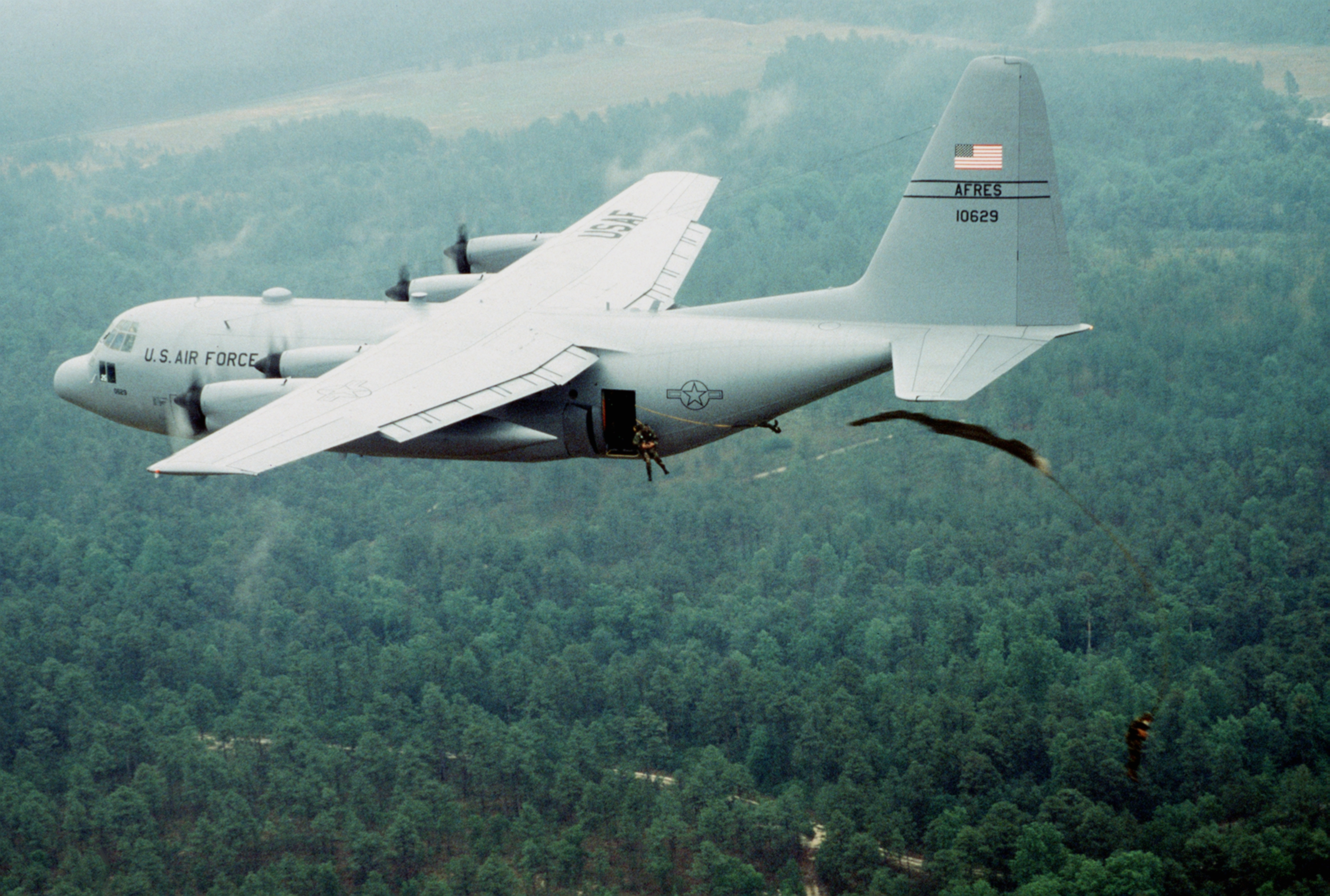
- Squadron C-130H Hercules dropping paratroopers in 1992 (Note: Aircraft is Lockheed C-130H-LM Hercules, serial 81-0629. This plane was later transferred to the Arkansas Air National Guard and is used in training. Baugher, Joe (3 March 2023). "1981 USAF Serial Numbers". Joe Baugher. Picture taken during the Rodeo 2 competition at Pope Air Force Base, North Carolina.)
- Active: 1943–1945; 1947–1949; 1952–present
- Country: United States
- Branch: United States Air Force
- Role: Airlift
- Part of: Air Force Reserve Command
- Garrison/HQ: Dobbins Air Reserve Base, Georgia
- Engagements: European Theater of Operations
- Decorations: Distinguished Unit Citation; Air Force Outstanding Unit Award; French Croix de Guerre with Palm; Republic of Vietnam Gallantry Cross with Palm

Insignia
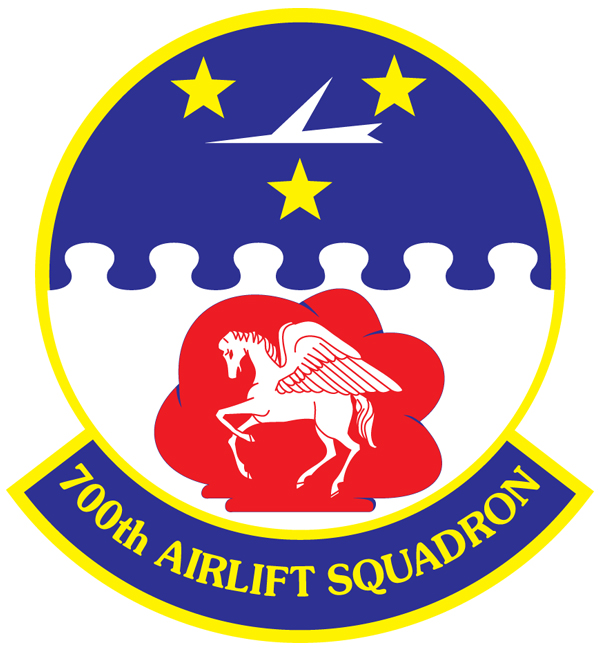
- 700th Airlift Squadron emblem (Note: Approved 13 December 1973.)

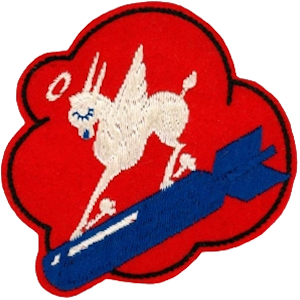
- Patvch with 700th Bombardment Squadron emblem (Note: Approved 24 August 1944. Description: In front of a large irregular outline red cloud formation, a caricatured, white, winged colt ("Asbestos Alice"), with halo of like color, riding a large blue aerial bomb, point to dexter base.)
- World War II Fuselage Code: IS

The 700th Airlift Squadron is part of the 94th Airlift Wing at Dobbins Air Reserve Base, Georgia. It operates Lockheed C-130 Hercules aircraft providing global airlift.

The squadron was first activated in April 1943 as the 700th Bombardment Squadron. After training in the United States, it deployed with its Consolidated B-24 Liberators to the European Theater of Operations, where it participated in the strategic bombing campaign until the end of hostilities, earning a Distinguished Unit Citation and a French Croix de Guerre with Palm for its actions. It returned to the United States in the summer of 1945 and was inactivated in September.

The squadron was reactivated in the reserves in 1947, although it is not clear whether it was fully manned or equipped before inactivating in 1949. It was activated again in the reserves in 1952 as the 700th Fighter-Bomber Squadron. In 1957, it assumed the airlift role as the 700th Troop Carrier Squadron. The squadron was called to active duty during the Cuban Missile Crisis and again for the Pueblo Crisis. The squadron has served as a reserve airlift unit since 1957.

== Mission ==
Maintain combat ready aircrews and aircraft capable of deploying in response to worldwide contingencies and emergencies.

== History ==
=== World War II ===
==== Organization and training in the United States ====
The 700th Bombardment Squadron was activated 1 April 1943 at Gowen Field in Idaho, where initial organization took place while key personnel traveled to Orlando Army Air Base, Florida for training with the Army Air Forces School of Applied Tactics. Both elements met at Wendover Army Air Field, Utah on 8 June 1943, where initial training with the Consolidated B-24 Liberator took place. The squadron moved to Sioux City Army Air Base, Iowa in July 1943 to complete training. In September the squadron began to receive B-24H aircraft, the model of the Liberator they would fly in combat.

On 20 October 1943 the ground echelon moved to Camp Shanks, New York and embarked on the RMS Queen Mary on 26 October 1943, sailing next day. The unit arrived in the Firth of Clyde, Scotland on 2 November 1943 and disembarked at Gourock. The air echelon departed Sioux City late in October 1943 and flew to the United Kingdom via the southern route: Florida, Puerto Rico, Brazil, and West Africa. Upon arrival, the squadron was stationed at RAF Tibenham as part of the 2nd Combat Bombardment Wing.

==== Combat in Europe ====
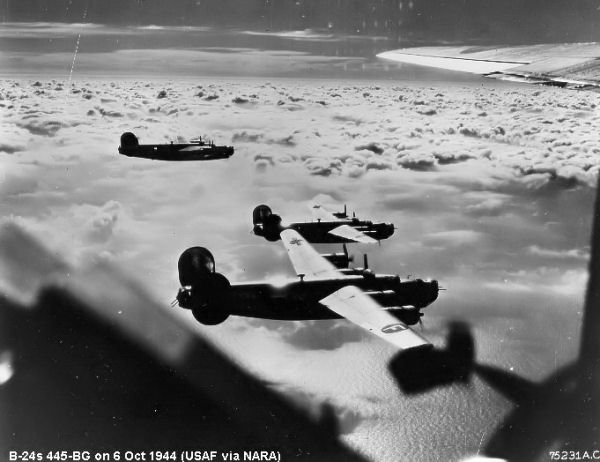
B-24 Liberators of the 445th Bomb Group on a mission over enemy-occupied territory

The 700th entered combat on 13 December 1943 by attacking U-boat installations at Kiel. The unit operated primarily as a strategic bombardment organization until the war ended, striking such targets as industries in Osnabrück, synthetic oil plants in Lutzendorf, chemical works in Ludwigshafen, marshalling yards at Hamm, an airfield at Munich, an ammunition plant at Duneberg, underground oil storage facilities at Ehmen, and factories at Münster.

The squadron participated in the Allied campaign against the German aircraft industry during Big Week, from 20 to 25 February 1944, being awarded a Distinguished Unit Citation for attacking a Messerschmitt Bf 110 aircraft assembly plant at Gotha on 24 February. This was the longest running continuous air battle of World War II – some two and a half hours of fighter attacks and flak en route and leaving the target area. Bomb damage assessment photographs showed that the plant was knocked out of production indefinitely.

The unit occasionally flew air interdiction and air support missions. It helped to prepare for the invasion of Normandy by bombing airfields, V-1 and V-2 launch sites, and other targets. It attacked shore installations on D-Day, 6 June 1944, and supported ground forces at Saint-Lô by striking enemy defenses in July 1944. During the Battle of the Bulge, between December 1944 and January 1945 it bombed German communications. Early on 24 March 1945 the 700th dropped food, medical supplies, and ammunition to troops that landed near Wesel during the airborne assault across the Rhine and that afternoon flew a bombing mission to the same area, hitting a landing ground at Stormede.

On occasion the unit dropped propaganda leaflets and hauled fuel to France. It was awarded the Croix de guerre with Palm by the French government for operations in the theater from December 1943 to February 1945 supplying the resistance.

The 700th's most tragic mission was the attack on Kassel of 27 September 1944. In clouds, the lead bomber of the 445th Bombardment Group turned east and the 35 planes of the 700th and the other squadrons of the group left the bomber stream of the 2d Air Division and proceeded to Göttingen some 35 miles (56 km) from the primary target. After the bomb run, the group was alone in the skies and was attacked from the rear by an estimated 150 Luftwaffe planes, resulting in the most concentrated air battle in history. The Luftwaffe unit was a Sturmgruppe, a special unit intended to attack bombers by flying in tight formations of up to ten fighters in line abreast. This was intended to break the bomber formation at a single pass. The 361st Fighter Group intervened, preventing complete destruction of the group. Twenty-nine German and 25 American planes went down in a 15-mile (24 km) radius. Only four of the 445th group's planes made it back to the base – two crashing in France, one in Belgium, another at RAF Old Buckenham. Two landed at RAF Manston. Only one of the 35 attacking aircraft was fit to fly next day.

After the end of the air war in Europe, the 700th flew low level "Trolley" missions over Germany carrying ground personnel so they could see the result of their efforts during the war. The group's air echelon departed Tibenham on 17 May 1945, and left the United Kingdom on 20 May 1945. The 700th ground echelon sailed on the USAT Cristobal from Bristol. The ship arrived at New York on 8 June 1945. Personnel were given 30 days R&R. The squadron reestablished at Fort Dix, New Jersey, with the exception of the air echelon, which had flown to Sioux Falls Army Air Field, South Dakota. Most personnel were discharged or transferred to other units, and only a handful were left when the unit was inactivated on 12 September 1945.

=== Air Force reserve ===
==== Bombardment unit ====
The 700th Bombardment Squadron was activated again under Air Defense Command (ADC) in the reserves during the summer of 1947 at McChord Field, Washington, where it trained under the supervision of the 406th AAF Base Unit. The squadron was nominally a Boeing B-29 Superfortress very heavy bombardment squadron, although it is not certain that it was equipped or fully manned. In 1948, Continental Air Command (ConAC) assumed reserve training responsibility from ADC and the 406th Base Unit became the 2345th AF Reserve Training Center. After conducting training for two years, the squadron was inactivated in June 1949, when ConAC reorganized its combat units under the wing base organizational model. It was replaced at McChord by elements of the 302d Troop Carrier Wing.

==== Fighter operations ====
The squadron was activated again in the reserves in 1952 at Buffalo Municipal Airport, New York as the 700th Fighter-Bomber Squadron. Although designated as a fighter unit, until 1955 the squadron primarily flew North American T-6 Texan trainer aircraft, although it was equipped with a few North American F-51 Mustangs and Lockheed F-80 Shooting Stars. In 1955 the 700th moved a few miles to Niagara Falls Municipal Airport as a Republic F-84 Thunderjet unit. Despite its fighter-bomber designation, the squadron was gained by ADC upon mobilization. ADC required the squadron be designed to augment active duty squadrons capable of performing air defense missions for an indefinite period after mobilization independently of its parent wing. In 1957, budget cuts led to a reduction in the number of reserve squadrons from 55 to 45. In addition, within the Air Staff was a recommendation that the reserve fighter mission be given to the Air National Guard and replaced by the troop carrier mission. As a result, the 700th redesignated as the 700th Troop Carrier Squadron in September and began training in Fairchild C-119 Flying Boxcar aircraft. In mid-November 1957 the 700th squadron's mission, personnel and equipment were transferred to the 64th Troop Carrier Squadron, and the squadron moved on paper to Dobbins Air Force Base, Georgia.

==== Troop carrier operations ====
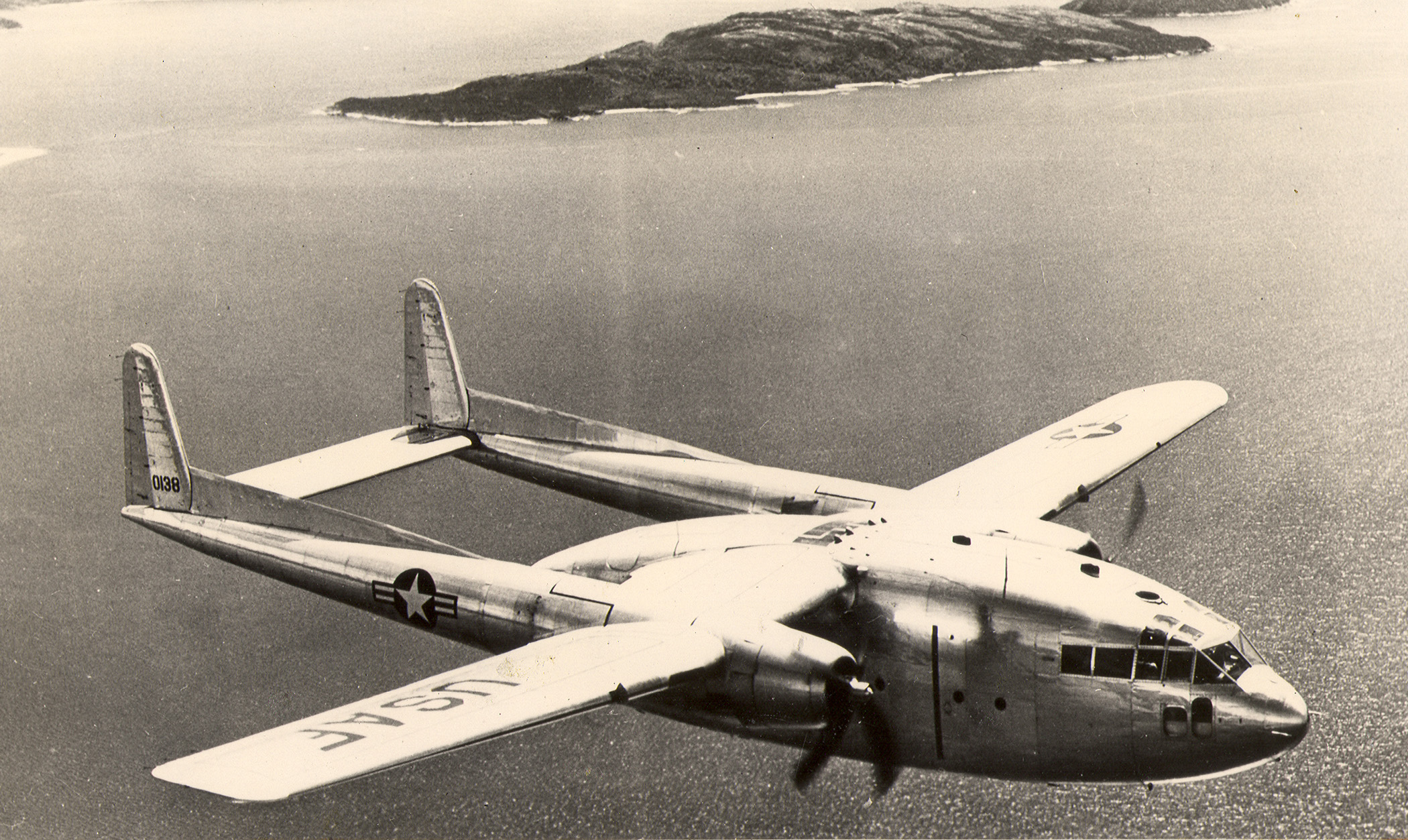
Fairchild C-119 of the Air Force Reserve

At Dobbins, the squadron replaced the 812th and 813th Fighter-Bomber Squadrons. Simultaneously with the move of the 445th Troop Carrier Wing and squadron to Dobbins, the 445th Group moved to Memphis Municipal Airport, and the 700th was attached directly to the wing. When Continental Air Command reorganized under the dual deputy system in November the squadron attachment to the wing became an assignment. The 700th's time with the Flying Boxcar was brief, for at Dobbins it began to transition into the Fairchild C-123 Provider.

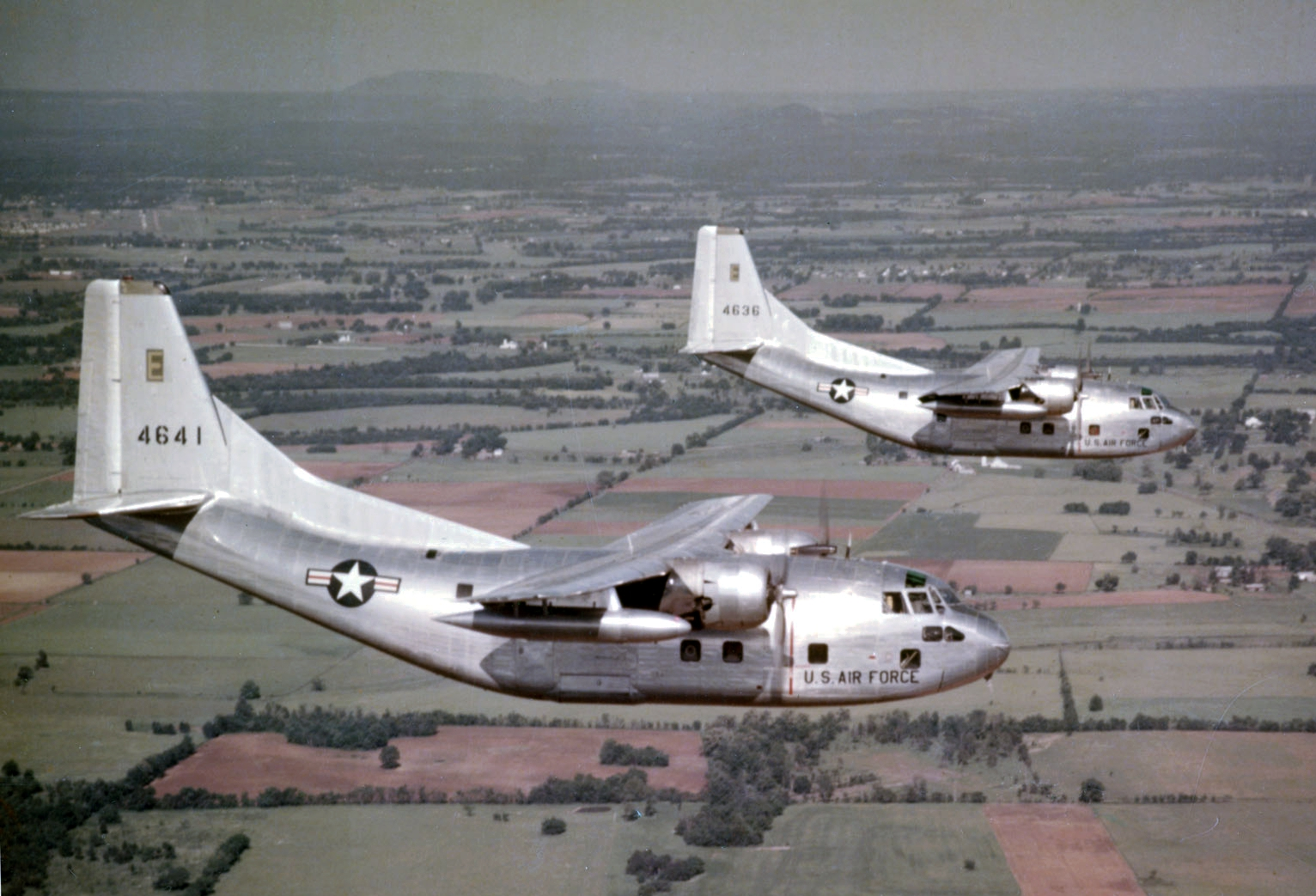
C-123Bs in flight

The 445th's other flying units were located at other stations. This was not a problem when the entire wing was called to active service, but mobilizing a single flying squadron and elements to support it proved difficult. This weakness was demonstrated in the partial mobilization of reserve units during the Berlin Crisis of 1961. To resolve this, ConAC determined to reorganize its reserve wings by establishing groups with support elements for each of its troop carrier squadrons at the start of 1962. This reorganization would facilitate mobilization of elements of wings in various combinations when needed. However, as the plan to form support units at dispersed locations was entering its implementation phase, another partial mobilization, which included the 700th, occurred on 28 October 1962 for the Cuban Missile Crisis, with the squadron continuing to operate from Dobbins while mobilized. All reserve units were released on 22 November 1962. The formation of troop carrier groups was delayed until February for wings that had been mobilized. In February, the 918th Troop Carrier Group, which included the 700th and support organizations was activated at Dobbins.

==== Heavy airlift ====
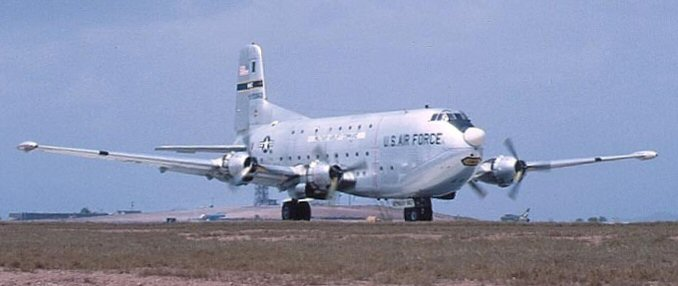
C-124 Globemaster II as flown by the squadron

The unit began transitioning into the Douglas C-124 Globemaster II as a heavy airlift unit in 1965 and was briefly designated the 700th Air Transport Squadron in December, before becoming the 700th Military Airlift Squadron a month later in a general redesignation of strategic airlift units. It was again called to active duty on 26 January 1968 during the Pueblo crisis, being released on to 2 June 1969. Once again it operated from Dobbins while mobilized.

==== Return to theater airlift mission ====
In 1972, the squadron re-equipped with de Havilland Canada C-7 Caribou as it became the 700th Tactical Airlift Squadron'. The squadron assisted with the redeployment of Army and Marine Corps personnel from Grenada following Operation Urgent Fury in 1983. It again upgraded its equipment in 1982, when it began to fly the Lockheed C-130 Hercules. In 1984 and 1985, the squadron helped deploy U.S. military personnel throughout Central and South America from Howard Air Force Base, Panama in support of Operations Volant Oak and Coronet Oak.

During the 1990s, the 700th helped deploy U.S. forces to Saudi Arabia in support of Operation Desert Shield. If flew in support of Operation Provide Promise and Operation Provide Comfort II. During the 2000s the 700th transitioned into a school house training future C-130 copilots and aircraft commanders. In 2011 the 700th made a full transition back to a combat coded unit and has flown several deployments in support of Operation Inherent Resolve and Operation Enduring Freedom.

== Lineage ==
- Constituted as the 700th Bombardment Squadron (Heavy) on 20 March 1943

Activated on 1 April 1943

- Redesignated 700th Bombardment Squadron, Heavy 20 August 1943

Inactivated on 12 September 1945

- Redesignated 700th Bombardment Squadron, Very Heavy and allotted to the reserve on 13 May 1947

Activated on 12 July 1947
Inactivated on 27 June 1949

- Redesignated 700th Fighter-Bomber Squadron on 24 June 1952

Activated on 8 July 1952

- Redesignated 700th Troop Carrier Squadron, Medium on 6 September 1957
- Redesignated 700th Troop Carrier Squadron, Assault on 25 September 1958
- Redesignated 700th Troop Carrier Squadron, Heavy on 8 July 1965
- Redesignated 700th Air Transport Squadron, Heavy on 1 December 1965
- Redesignated 700th Military Airlift Squadron on 1 January 1966
- Redesignated 700th Tactical Airlift Squadron on 1 April 1972
- Redesignated 700th Airlift Squadron on 1 February 1992

=== Assignments ===
- 445th Bombardment Group: 1 April 1943 – 12 September 1945
- 445th Bombardment Group: 12 July 1947 – 27 June 1949
- 445th Fighter-Bomber Group (later 445th Troop Carrier Group: 8 July 1952 (attached to 445th Troop Carrier Wing after 16 November 1957)
- 445th Troop Carrier Wing: 25 September 1958
- 918th Troop Carrier Group (later 918th Air Transport Group, 918th Military Airlift Group, 918th Tactical Airlift Group): 11 February 1963
- 94th Airlift Wing: 1 September 1975
- 94th Operations Group: 1 August 1992 – present

=== Stations ===
- Gowen Field, Idaho, 1 April 1943
- Wendover Field, Utah, 8 June 1943
- Sioux City Army Air Base, Iowa, 8 July 1943 – 20 October 1943
- RAF Tibenham (Station 124), England, 2 November 1943 – 30 May 1945
- Fort Dix Army Air Base, New Jersey, 9 June 1945 – 12 September 1945
- McChord Air Force Base, Washington, 12 July 1947 – 27 June 1949
- Buffalo Municipal Airport, New York, 8 July 1952
- Niagara Falls Municipal Airport, New York, 15 June 1955
- Dobbins Air Force Base (later Dobbins Air Reserve Base), Georgia, 16 November 1957 – Present

=== Aircraft ===
- Consolidated B-24 Liberator (1943–1945)
- North American T-6 Texan (1952–1955)
- North American P-51 Mustang (1953–1954)
- Lockheed F-80 Shooting Star (1953–1956)
- Republic F-84 Thunderjet (1954–1957)
- Fairchild C-119 Flying Boxcar (1957–1958)
- Fairchild C-123 Provider (1957–1965)
- Douglas C-124 Globemaster II (1965–1972)
- de Havilland Canada C-7 Caribou (1972–1982)
- Lockheed C-130 Hercules (1982 – present)

=== Awards and campaigns ===
Award streamer	Award	Dates	Notes
	Distinguished Unit Citation	24 February 1944	Gotha, Germany 701st Bombardment Squadron
	Air Force Outstanding Unit Award	26 January 1968-31 March 1969	700th Military Airlift Squadron
	Air Force Outstanding Unit Award	1 April 1971-30 June 1972	700th Military Airlift Squadron (later 700th Tactical Airlift Squadron
	Air Force Outstanding Unit Award	1 July 1972-15 March 1974	700th Tactical Airlift Squadron
	Air Force Outstanding Unit Award	1 January 1976-30 November 1977	700th Tactical Airlift Squadron
	Air Force Outstanding Unit Award	1 January 1981-31 December 1982	700th Tactical Airlift Squadron
	Air Force Outstanding Unit Award	1 January 1984-31 July 1985	700th Tactical Airlift Squadron
	Air Force Outstanding Unit Award	15 August 1987-14 August 1989	700th Tactical Airlift Squadron
	Air Force Outstanding Unit Award	30 August 1990-29 August 1992	700th Tactical Airlift Squadron (later 700th Airlift Squadron)
	Air Force Outstanding Unit Award	16 August 1992-15 August 1994	700th Airlift Squadron
	Air Force Outstanding Unit Award	16 August 1995-15 August 1997	700th Airlift Squadron
	French Croix de Guerre with Palm	December 1943 – February 1945	700th Bombardment Squadron
	Vietnamese Gallantry Cross with Palm	1 April 1966-31 March 1972	700th Military Airlift Squadron

Campaign Streamer	Campaign	Dates	Notes
	Air Offensive, Europe	2 November 1943 – 5 June 1944	700th Bombardment Squadron
	Air Combat, EAME Theater	2 November 1943 – 11 May 1945	700th Bombardment Squadron
	Normandy	6 June 1944 – 24 July 1944	700th Bombardment Squadron
	Northern France	25 July 1944 – 14 September 1944	700th Bombardment Squadron
	Rhineland	15 September 1944 – 21 March 1945	700th Bombardment Squadron
	Ardennes-Alsace	16 December 1944 – 25 January 1945	700th Bombardment Squadron
	Central Europe	22 March 1944 – 21 May 1945	700th Bombardment Squadron

== See also ==
- B-24 Liberator units of the United States Army Air Forces
- List of United States Air Force airlift squadrons
- List of C-130 Hercules operators
