= 94th Operations Group =

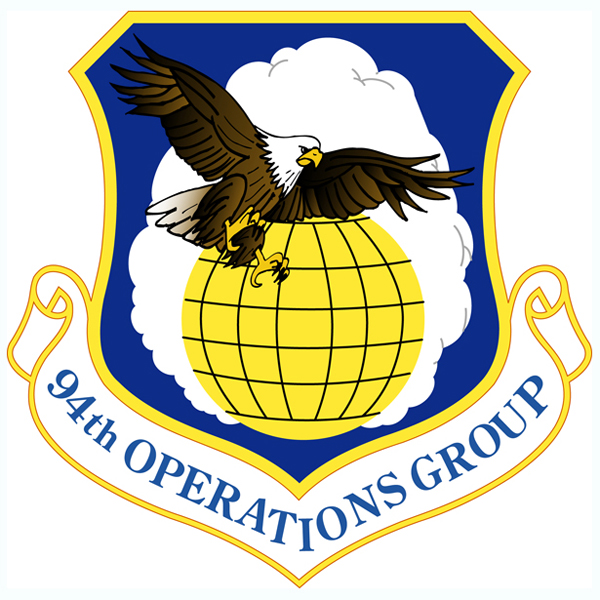
- Emblem of the 94th Operations Group
- Active: 1943–1945; 1947–1951; 1952–1959; 1992–present
- Country: United States
- Branch: United States Air Force

Commanders
- Current commander: Col. Terence Green

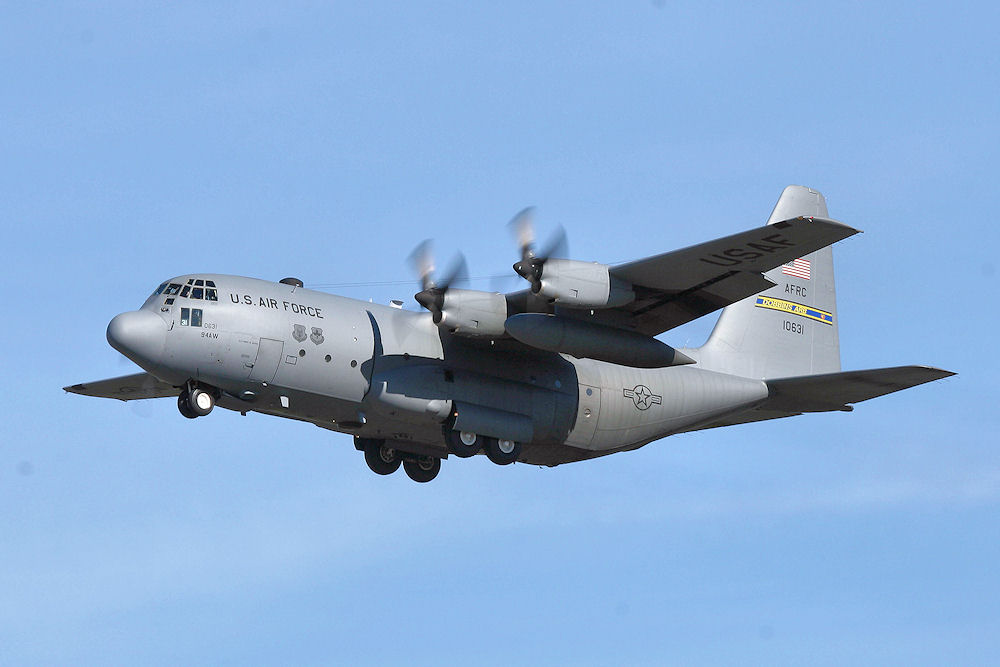
Lockheed C-130H-LM Hercules 81-0631 of the 700th Airlift Squadron prepares for approach and landing at Dobbins.

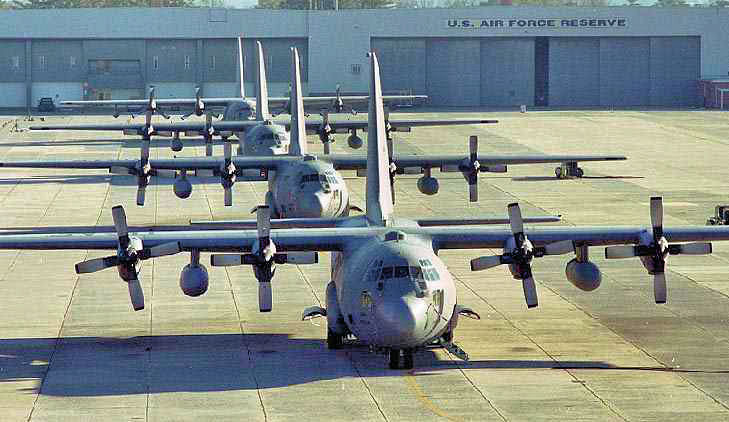
700th Airlift Squadron C-130s on the Dobbins Flightline

The 94th Operations Group (94 OG) is the flying component of the 94th Airlift Wing, assigned to the United States Air Force Reserve. The group is stationed at Dobbins Air Reserve Base, Georgia.

During World War II, its predecessor unit, the 94th Bombardment Group (Heavy) was an Eighth Air Force B-17 Flying Fortress unit in England, stationed at RAF Bury St. Edmunds. The group flew 324 combat missions and was awarded two Distinguished Unit Citations, 17 August 1943: Operations over Regensburg, and 11 January 1944 over Brunswick. Its last mission was flown on 21 April 1945.

== Overview ==
The 94th Operations group is the flying component of the 94th Airlift Wing. Its primary mission is to train C-130H aircrews for the United States Air Force – active duty, guard and reserve components. Its second mission is to maintain combat ready units to deploy on short notice to support contingencies anywhere in the world.

== Assigned Units ==
- 700th Airlift Squadron
- 94th Aeromedical Evacuation Squadron
- 94th Operations Support Squadron
- 94th Airlift Control Flight

== History ==
=== World War II ===
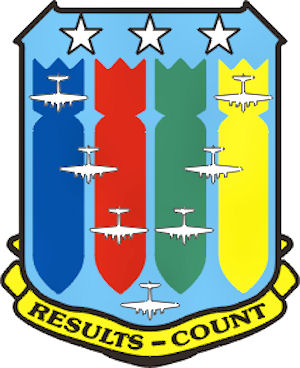
Emblem of the 94th Bombardment Group

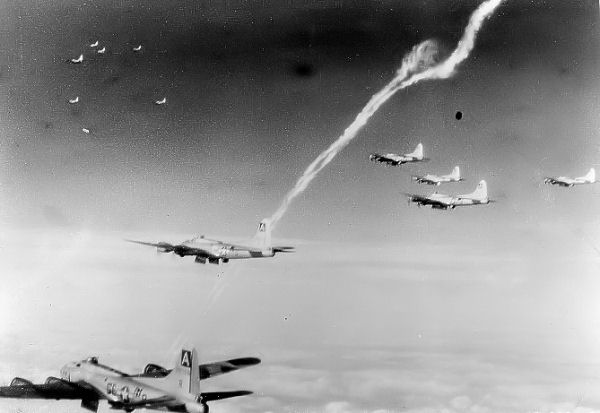
B-17s of the 410th Bomb Squadron on a mission over occupied Europe

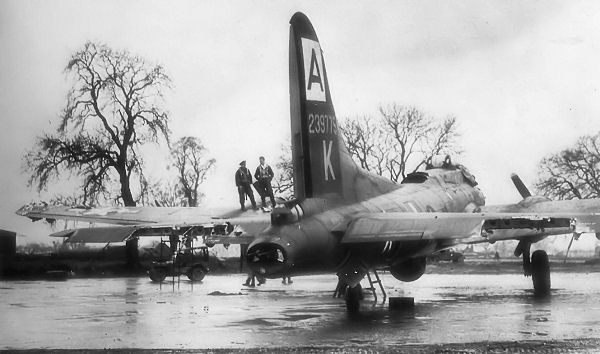
Lockheed/Vega B-17G-1-VE Fortress Serial 42-39775 damaged during a raid on the Bf 110 assembly plant at Waggum, near Brunswick Germany – 11 January 1944. This aircraft was repaired and returned to service, however it was again severely damaged and scrapped on 3 November 1944.

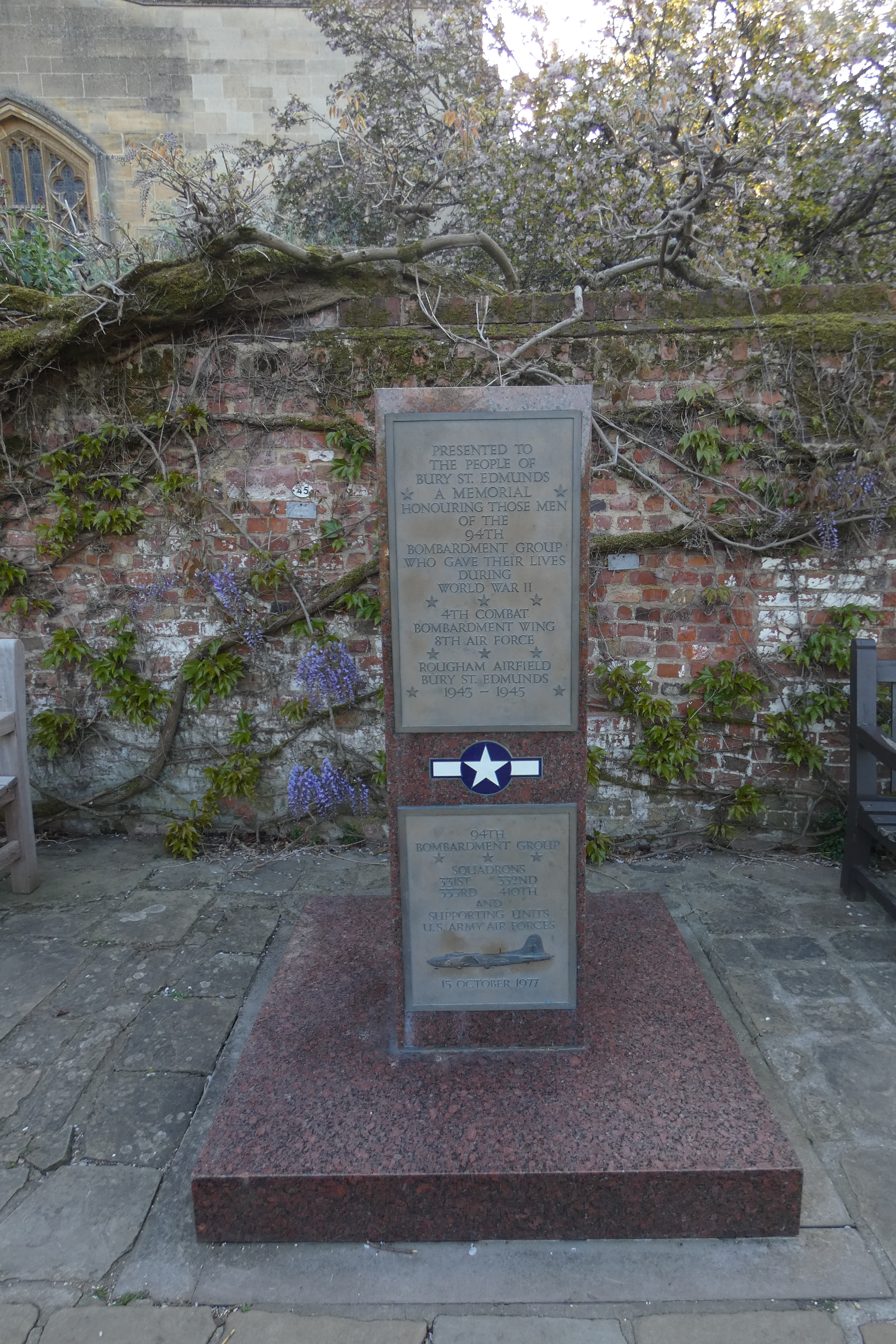
A memorial to the 94th Bombardment Group was unveiled in Appleby Rose Garden in the Abbey Gardens at Bury St Edmunds, Suffolk, in 1978.

Activated 15 June 1942 at McDill Field FL. Nucleus established Pendleton Field, Ore, on 29 June 1942 and engaged in initial training. Detailed training at Davis-Monthan Fielf in Arizona between 28 August 1942 and 31 October 1942 and at Biggs Field Texas between 1 November 1942 and 2 January 1943. Final phase training at Pueblo Colorado in January 1943 to the end of March 1943. Air echelon began movement overseas on 1 April 1943. The ground element left for Camp Kilmer, New Jersey on 17 April 1943 and sailed on the Queen Elizabeth on 5 May 1943, and arriving in Greenock on 11 May 1943. The 94th was assigned to the Eighth Air Force 4th Combat Bombardment Wing, and the group tail code was a "Square-A".

The 94th flew its first mission on 13 June 1943, bombing an airfield at Saint-Omer. After that, the group attacked such strategic objectives as the port of St Nazaire, shipyards at Kiel, an aircraft component parts factory at Kassel, a synthetic rubber plant at Hanover, a chemical factory at Ludwigshafen, marshalling yards at Frankfurt, oil facilities at Merseburg, and ball-bearing works at Eberhausen.

The group withstood repeated assaults by enemy interceptors to bomb an aircraft factory at Regensburg on 17 August 1943, being awarded a Distinguished Unit Citation for the mission. Braving adverse weather, heavy flak, and savage fighter attacks, the group completed a strike against an aircraft parts factory in Brunswick on 11 January 1944 and received a 2d DUC for this operation. This DUC was especially meaningful, as it was given for a mission where the bomb group ignored a recall order from headquarters, and proceeded to the target alone, the other assigned groups having turned back as ordered. The 94th made the first pass over the target and realized that cloud cover obscured the target (the reason for the recall). The group performed a difficult formation turn over the intensely defended target and approached from a different direction, where favorable drop conditions were found. Expecting to be reprimanded on their return, the group was astonished to find that they were singled out for distinction for their courage and tenacity under fire. This incident was reflected in the script for the movie "Twelve O'Clock High" where the fictional bomb group performed a similar feat, similarly claiming radio reception difficulties as the reason for the missed recall.

The 94th took part in the campaign of heavy bombers against the enemy aircraft industry during Big Week, 20–25 February 1944. Sometimes operated in support of ground forces and flew interdictory missions. Prior to D-Day in June 1944, helped to neutralize V-weapon sites, airfields, and other military installations along the coast of France. On 6 June the group bombed enemy positions in the battle area to support the invasion of Normandy. Struck troops and gun batteries to aid the advance of the Allies at Saint-Lô in July and at Brest in August. Covered the airborne attack on the Netherlands in September. Hit marshalling yards, airfields, and strong points near the combat area during the Battle of the Bulge, December 1944 – January 1945. Bombed transportation, communications, and oil targets in the final push over the Rhine and across Germany.

Scheduled for occupational air forces in Germany but plans changed in September 1945. Remained in the United Kingdom during latter part of 1945 flying 'Nickle' Project missions-dropping leaflets over former occupied countries and to displaced persons in Germany. Assigned 1 AD, on 8 August 1945. In November 1945 Forty Five aircraft returned to the US or transferred to other units, and the squadrons were inactivated. Remaining personnel left Bury St. Edmunds on 11 December 1945. The group inactivated Camp Kilmer on 21 December 1945.

=== Cold War ===
Allotted to the US Air Force Reserve and established as a B-26 Invader light bomber group in 1949. Activated as a result of the Korean War in March 1951, with its personnel and equipment being transferred to units in Far East Air Force as replacements. Inactivated as a "paper unit" ten days later.

Reactivated in the reserve as a night tactical reconnaissance unit flying RB-26s in 1952, later flying, and later as a tactical fighter unit in the mid-1950s. Re-equipped as a Tactical Air Command Troop Carrier group with C-119 Flying Boxcars until inactivated in 1959 when its parent wing converted to the Air Force tri-deputate organization and assigned all flying units to the wing.

=== From the 1990s ===
The group was reactivated as the 94th Operations Group on 1 August 1992 under the Air Force "Objective Wing" concept. It was bestowed the history, lineage and honors of the 94th Tactical Airlift Group and predecessor units. The 94th Airlift Wing assigned its 700th Airlift Squadron to the group flying C-130s.

The unit is capable of deploying 9 C-130s on very short notice to a bare base and operate indefinitely. This includes operating the base, feeding the personnel, maintaining and loading the aircraft, and providing medical services to include evacuation of military personnel.

Personnel from the 94 OG have been involved in every major national crisis since the end of the Cold War. From Provide Promise (Bosnian Airlift) through Hurricanes Hugo and Mitch recovery operations to Operation Shining Hope (Kosovo Airlift). This has been done totally with volunteers.

In mid-2001, the 700th Airlift Squadron's conversion to a training mission was the major change underway within the group. The 700th AS was expected, as a result, to take on the responsibility of training all Active Air Force, Guard and Reserve C-130H crew members.

== Lineage ==
- Established as 94th Bombardment Group (Heavy) on 28 January 1942

Activated on 15 June 1942
Redesignated 94th Bombardment Group, Heavy on 20 August 1943
Inactivated on 21 December 1945

- Redesignated 94th Bombardment Group, Very Heavy on 13 May 1947

Activated in the Reserve on 29 May 1947
Redesignated 94th Bombardment Group, Light on 26 June 1949
Ordered to Active Service on 10 March 1951
Inactivated on 20 March 1951

- Redesignated 94th Tactical Reconnaissance Group on 26 May 1952

Activated in the Reserve on 14 June 1952
Redesignated: 94th Bombardment Group, Tactical on 18 May 1955
Redesignated: 94th Troop Carrier Group, Medium on 1 July 1957
Inactivated on 14 April 1959

- Redesignated: 94th Tactical Airlift Group on 31 July 1985 (Remained inactive)
- Redesignated: 94th Operations Group on 1 August 1992

Activated in the Reserve on 1 August 1992.

== Assignments ==
- III Bomber Command, 15 June 1942
- II Bomber Command, 29 June 1942
- Eighth Air Force, 12 May 1943
- VIII Bomber Command, 19 May 1943
- 4th Bombardment Wing, 25 May 1943

Attached to: 401 Provisional Combat Wing Bombardment, 6 June 1943

- 3d Air Division, 13 September 1943
- 4th Combat Bombardment Wing, 14 September 1943
- 14th Bombardment Wing, 16 June 1945
- 3d Air Division, 8 August 1945
- 1st Air Division, 12 August 1945
- 3d Air Division, 28 September 1945
- VIII Fighter Command, 1 November– December 1945
- 19th Bombardment Wing (later, 19 Air Division), 29 May 1947
- 94th Bombardment Wing, 26 June 1949 – 20 March 1951
- 94th Tactical Reconnaissance (later, 94 Bombardment; 94 Troop Carrier), 14 June 1952 – 14 April 1959
- 94th Airlift Wing, 1 August 1992–present

== Components ==
- 331st Bombardment (later, 731st Troop Carrier) Squadron (PN): 15 June 1942 – 29 November 1945; 29 May 1947 – 20 March 1951; 14 June 1952 – 14 April 1959
- 332d Bombardment (later, 732d Troop Carrier) Squadron (XM): 15 June 1942 – 15 December 1945; 29 May 1947 – 20 March 1951; 14 June 1952 – 14 April 1959
- 333d Bombardment (Later, 733d Troop Carrier) Squadron (TS): 15 June 1942 – 1 December 1945; 29 May 1947 – 20 March 1951; 14 June 1952 – 18 May 1955
- 410th Bombardment Squadron (GL): 15 June 1942 – 19 December 1945; 17 July 1947 – 20 March 1951
- 700th Airlift Squadron: 1 August 1992–present

== Stations ==
- MacDill Field, Florida, 15 June 1942
- Pendleton Field, Oregon, 29 June 1942
- Davis-Monthan Field, Arizona, 29 August 1942
- Biggs Field, Texas, 1 November 1942
- Pueblo Army Air Base, Colorado, 2 January – 17 April 1943
- RAF Bassingbourn (USAAF Station 121), England, 1 April – 12 May 1943
- RAF Earls Colne (USAAF Station 358), England, 12 May - 9 June 1943
- RAF Bury St. Edmunds (USAAF Station 468), England, 9 June 1943 – 12 December 1945
- Camp Kilmer, New Jersey, 20–21 December 1945
- Marietta AAFld (later, Marietta AFB; Dobbins AFB), Georgia, 29 May 1947 – 20 March 1951
- Dobbins AFB, Georgia, 14 June 1952
- Scott AFB, Illinois, 18 May 1955
- Laurence G. Hanscom Field, Massachusetts, 16 November 1957 – 14 April 1959
- Dobbins ARB, Georgia, 1 August 1992–present

== Aircraft assigned ==
- Boeing B-17 Flying Fortress, 1942–1945
- Boeing B-29 Superfortress, 1947–1949
- Douglas B/RB-26 Invader, 1949–1951; 1953–1957
- Curtiss C-46 Commando, 1952–1955
- North American TF/F-51 Mustang, 1953–1955
- Douglas C-54 Skymaster, 1953–1955
- Lockheed F-80 Shooting Star, 1954–1955
- Republic F-84 Thunderstreak, 1954–1955
- Douglas C-47 Skytrain, 1955
- C-119 Flying Boxcar, 1957, 1957–1959
- Lockheed C-130 Hercules, 1992–present
