= 94th Airlift Wing =

94th Airlift Wing

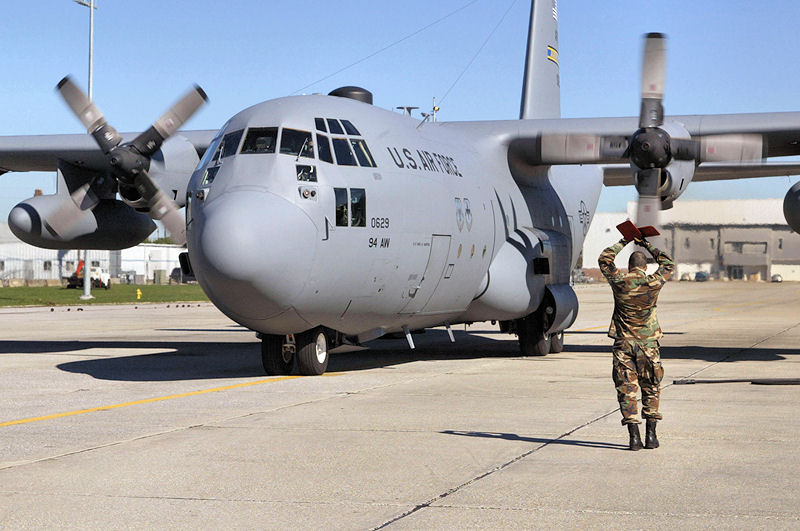
- A member of the 94th Airlift Control Flight marshals a Lockheed C-130H Hercules after a training mission at Dobbins Air Reserve Base
- Active: 1949–1951; 1952–present
- Country: United States
- Branch: United States Air Force
- Type: Wing
- Role: Airlift
- Size: 1,660 personnel
- Part of: Air Force Reserve Command
- Garrison/HQ: Dobbins Air Reserve Base, Georgia.
- Decorations: Air Force Outstanding Unit Award; Republic of Vietnam Gallantry Cross with Palm

Commanders
- Current commander: Colonel Diane Patton

Insignia
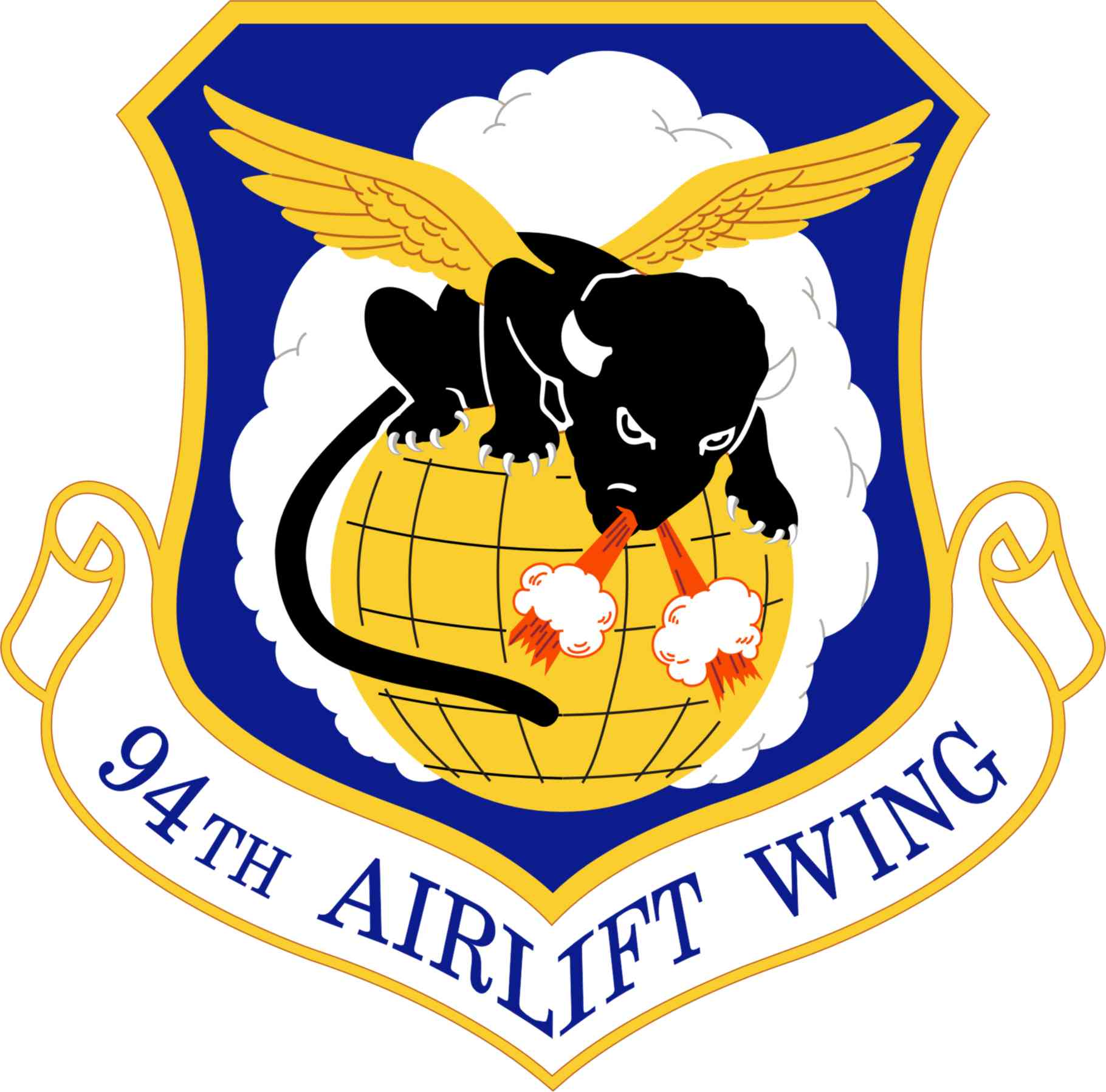
- 94th Airlift Wing emblem (Note: Approved 6 April 1956.) (Note: This emblem was originally approved for the 94th Bombardment Wing. It was replaced in May 1959, but restored by 9 November 2004. Ravenstein, pp. 132–33; Robertson, Factsheet 94 Airlift Wing.)

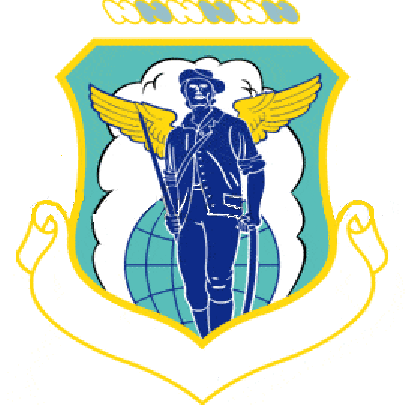
- 94th Troop Carrier Wing emblem (Note: Approved 19 May 1959.)
- Tail stripe: Blue, "Dobbins" in Yellow

Aircraft flown
- Transport: C-130 Hercules

The 94th Airlift Wing is a reserve unit of the United States Air Force. It is assigned to the Twenty-Second Air Force of the Air Force Reserve Command and is stationed at Dobbins Air Reserve Base, Georgia. When mobilized, most of the wing would be presented to US Transportation Command, while a smaller proportion would be retained by AFRC.

The 94th Wing is the host organization at Dobbins ARB and is responsible for providing security, civil engineering, fire protection, air traffic control, airfield maintenance, and numerous other services the base and to tenant organizations assigned to the base.

== History ==
=== Bombardment and reconnaissance operations ===
First activated in June 1949 at Marietta Air Force Base as the 94th Bombardment Wing, the wing trained in the reserve as a light bomber wing until March 1951, when it was called to active service on 10 March 1951 during the Korean War. By 20 March all wing personnel had been transferred to other USAF organizations and the wing was inactivated on 1 April. The wing's aircraft were also distributed to other organizations

The wing was reactivated in the reserves in June 1952 at what was now called Dobbins Air Force Base as the 94th Tactical Reconnaissance Wing, replacing the 902d Reserve Training Wing. The reserve mobilization for the Korean war had left the reserve without aircraft, and the unit did not receive aircraft until July. Once it received aircraft, it began to train for the reconnaissance mission with a variety of aircraft.

The Air Force desired that all reserve units be designed to augment the regular forces in the event of a national emergency. The reserves, however, had six pilot training wings with no mobilization mission. On 18 May 1955, they were discontinued. In the resulting reorganization of reserve wings, the 94th Wing transferred its mission, personnel and equipment at Dobbins to the 482d Fighter-Bomber Wing and moved on paper to Scott Air Force Base, Illinois, where it absorbed the resources of the 8711th Pilot Training Wing and returned to its original role as a light bombardment unit.

=== Airlift operations ===
It flew its Douglas B-26 Invaders for only two years at Scott. The Joint Chiefs of Staff were pressuring the Air Force to provide more wartime airlift. At the same time, about 150 Fairchild C-119 Flying Boxcars became available from the active force. Consequently, in November 1956 the Air Force directed Continental Air Command to convert three reserve fighter bomber wings to the troop carrier mission by 1957. Cuts in the budget in 1957 also led to a reduction in the number of reserve wings from 24 to 15. As a result, reserve flying operations at Scott were reduced to a single squadron (the 73d Troop Carrier Squadron), and the wing moved on paper to Laurence G. Hanscom Field, Massachusetts in November 1957. On arrival at Hanscom, it absorbed the resources of the inactivating 89th Fighter-Bomber Wing and began conversion to Flying Boxcars. By 1958, wing personnel began taking part in regular airlift missions and exercises, both in the United States and overseas

In April 1959, the wing reorganized under the Dual Deputy system. Its 94th Troop Carrier Group was inactivated and the 731st and 732d Troop Carrier Squadrons were assigned directly to the wing. Although the 731st was located with the wing at Hanscom, the 732d was stationed at Grenier Field, New Hampshire under he Detached Squadron Concept, a program designed to lessen community impact and facilitate recruiting and manning by locating reserve squadron sized units in smaller population centers, rather than concentrating an entire wing in one location.

=== Activation of groups under the wing ===
Although the dispersal of flying units was not a problem when the entire wing was called to active service, mobilizing a single flying squadron and elements to support it proved difficult. This weakness was demonstrated in the partial mobilization of reserve units during the Berlin Crisis of 1961 To resolve this, at the start of 1962, Continental Air Command determined to reorganize its reserve wings by establishing groups with support elements for each of its troop carrier squadrons. This reorganization would facilitate mobilization of elements of wings in various combinations when needed. However, as this plan was entering its implementation phase, another partial mobilization, which included the 94th Wing, occurred for the Cuban Missile Crisis, with the units being released on 22 November 1962. The formation of troop carrier groups was delayed until February for wings that had been mobilized.

The wing also participated in contingency operations in the Dominican Republic in 1965.

The 902d Group at Grenier was inactivated in January 1966, when the station was turned over to the New Hampshire Air National Guard, but was replaced by the 905th Troop Carrier Group, which had recently moved to Westover Air Force Base, Massachusetts, in July. The wing's two groups converted to Douglas C-124 Globemaster IIs that year, and traded the "troop carrier" in their names for "military airlift" as the wing became the 94th Military Airlift Wing. The wing flew strategic airlift including troop and cargo-carrying missions to Southeast Asia until 1971, augmenting the airlift resources of Military Airlift Command and Tactical Air Command.

In February 1972, the 905th Group was reassigned to the 459th Military Airlift Wing, leaving the wing with only a single group. In July, it moved back to its original base at Dobbins and became the 94th Tactical Airlift Wing. It was assigned the 908th and 918th Tactical Airlift Groups, flying the de Havilland Canada C-7 Caribou. The wing's primary operations now involved support of Army airborne forces, tactical cargo airlift, and air evacuation missions.

From July 1973 to May 1975, the wing flew missions in Puerto Rico, airdropping 1.2 billion sterile screwworm flies as part of a project to eradicate the screwworm menace to Puerto Rico's livestock. It controlled the 907th Tactical Airlift Group with an aerial spraying mission between 1981 and 1989. In 1981, the 94th became the second largest wing in the Air Force Reserve, flying three different types of transport aircraft. By 1987, it had given up C-7 and C-123 aircraft, retaining only C-130s. In 1990–1991, wing personnel transported passengers and materiel between the United States and Southwest Asia.

Elements of the wing rotated regularly to Panama during the 1980s and 1990s. The wing participated in numerous humanitarian airlift and contingency operations worldwide, especially in the areas of Southwest Asia, Europe, and the Caribbean Sea. In the spring of 1996, wing personnel and aircraft deployed to Europe in support of peacekeeping operations in Bosnia.

Recent operations have been the Haiti invasion preparations; deployment to Ramstein Air Base, Germany for Bosnian airlift support; Somali aeromedical evacuation; air logistic support from Incirlik Air Base, Turkey; and preparations of hurricane relief supplies. In addition. Until its closure in 1999, the wing also routinely rotated aircraft/crews to the former Howard Air Force Base, Panama, for Latin and South American logistic support, a mission that has since shifted to Muñiz Air National Guard Base, Puerto Rico. On nearly a daily basis, unit personnel fly airlift missions throughout the United States and overseas.

=== Mission and units in the late 2010s ===
The 94th Wing is organized into a headquarters element, an operations group, maintenance group and mission support group, and a medical element. In total, the wing comprises 14 squadrons and 1 flight of over 1,600 personnel.

The primary mission of the wing is to maintain combat ready Lockheed C-130H Hercules aircraft to deploy on short notice to support contingencies. The secondary mission is as host organization for supporting all agencies and tenants at Dobbins Air Reserve Base. To accomplish this, the wing recruits, organizes, and trains Air Force reservists for active duty in time of war, national emergency, or contingency tasking employing them to deliver cargo and personnel into and out of airports as minimal as austere dirt runways to major international airports.

As the Dobbins ARB host organization, the 94 AW supports more than 10,000 national guardsmen, reservists and civilians from the Army, Navy, Air Force and Marines—all tenant commands at Dobbins ARB. The 94 AW is responsible for providing security, civil engineering, fire protection, air traffic control, and numerous other services for the base and to tenant organizations assigned to the base. This includes the maintenance of the airfield, which is also used by Army Aviation elements of the Georgia Army National Guard and the U.S. Army Reserve, Lockheed-Martin/Air Force Plant #6, and other Dobbins tenants.

The 94th Operations Group is responsible for aerial delivery operations, aeromedical evacuation, operations support and flying squadron activities, a deployable airlift control flight, airfield management, base weather, and air traffic control. The mission involves tactical combat airland and airdrop of personnel and equipment and forward deployed austere operational command and control of airlift support forces. Its units can deploy anywhere in the world in the event of heightened tension, outbreak of hostilities or to support humanitarian mission as dictated by the National Command Authority.

Group subordinate units are:

700th Airlift Squadron
94th Aeromedical Evacuation Squadron
94th Operations Support Squadron

The 94th Maintenance Group includes military and civilian members providing logistics support and maintenance for the wing's fleet of C-130H aircraft.

Group subordinate units are:

94th Maintenance Squadron
94th Aircraft Maintenance Squadron
94th Maintenance Group Staff

The 94th Mission Support Group operates and manages the Dobbins Air Reserve Base infrastructure. Included in this mission are "base security, computer-communications, utility services, environmental management, military and civilian personnel, information management, base services, lodging, recreation, food service, facility construction/maintenance, disaster preparedness, bioenvironmental engineering, fire protection and airfield maintenance." Dobbins shares runway access with Lockheed Martin Aeronautical Systems Company.

Group subordinate units are:

80th Aerial Port Squadron
94th Aerial Port Squadron, located at Robins Air Force Base, GA.
94th Civil Engineer Squadron
94th Communications Squadron
94th Force Support Squadron
94th Logistics Readiness Squadron
94th Mission Support Squadron
94th Security Forces Squadron
94th Aeromedical Staging Squadron

== Lineage ==
- Established as the 94th Bombardment Wing, Light on 10 May 1949

Activated in the reserve on 26 June 1949
Ordered to active service on 10 March 1951
Inactivated on 1 April 1951

- Redesignated 94th Tactical Reconnaissance Wing on 26 May 1952

Activated in the Reserve on 14 June 1952
Redesignated 94th Bombardment Wing, Tactical on 18 May 1955
Redesignated 94th Troop Carrier Wing, Medium on 1 July 1957
Ordered to active service on 28 October 1962
Relieved from active service on 28 November 1962
Redesignated 94th Military Airlift Wing on 1 October 1966
Redesignated 94th Tactical Airlift Wing on 1 July 1972
Redesignated 94th Airlift Wing on 1 February 1992

== Assignments ==
- Fourteenth Air Force, 26 June 1949 – 1 April 1951
- Fourteenth Air Force, 14 June 1952
- Tenth Air Force, 18 May 1955
- First Air Force, 16 November 1957
- Fourteenth Air Force, 25 May 1958
- First Air Force Reserve Region, 15 August 1960
- Ninth Air Force, 28 October 1962
- First Air Force Reserve Region, 28 November 1962 (attached to Second Air Force Reserve Region, 1 May – 23 June 1966)
- Eastern Air Force Reserve Region, 31 December 1969
- Fourteenth Air Force, 8 October 1976
- Twenty-Second Air Force, 1 July 1993
- Tenth Air Force, 1 October 1994
- Twenty-Second Air Force, 1 April 1997 – present

== Components ==
Groups

- 94th Bombardment Group (later 94th Tactical Reconnaissance Group, 94th Bombardment Group, 94th Troop Carrier Group, 94th Operations Group): 26 June 1949 – 20 March 1951; 14 June 1952 – 14 April 1959; 1 August 1992 – present
- 901st Troop Carrier Group (later 901st Military Airlift Group): 11 February 1963 – 1 July 1972
- 902d Troop Carrier Group: 11 February 1963 – 25 January 1966
- 905th Military Airlift Group: 1 July 1966 – 25 February 1972
- 906th Tactical Airlift Group: 1 April 1981 – 1 July 1982
- 907th Tactical Airlift Group: 1 April 1981 – 1 October 1989
- 908th Tactical Airlift Group: 1 July 1972 – 1 August 1992
- 910th Tactical Airlift Group (later 910th Airlift Group: 1 October 1989 – 1 August 1992
- 911th Tactical Airlift Group: attached 1 – 20 April 1971, assigned 21 April 1971 – 25 February 1972; 1 August 1992 – 1 October 1994
- 914th Tactical Airlift Group (later 914th Airlift Group): 1 January 1964 – 1 July 1966; 1 August 1992 – 1 October 1994
- 918th Tactical Airlift Group 1 July 1972 – 1 September 1975

Squadrons

- 700th Tactical Airlift Squadron (later 700th Airlift Squadron): 1 September 1975 – 1 August 1992
- 731st Troop Carrier Squadron: 14 April 1959 – 11 February 1963
- 732d Troop Carrier Squadron: 14 April 1959 – 11 February 1963

== Stations ==
- Marietta Air Force Base (later Dobbins Air Force Base), Georgia, 26 June 1949 – 1 April 1951
- Dobbins Air Force Base, Georgia, 14 June 1952
- Scott Air Force Base, Illinois, 18 May 1955
- Laurence G. Hanscom Field, Massachusetts, 16 November 1957
- Dobbins Air Force Base (later Dobbins Air Reserve Base), Georgia, 1 July 1972 – present

== Aircraft ==
- North American T-6 Texan, 1949–1950, 1952–1954
- Beechcraft T-7 Navigator, 1949–1951
- Beechcraft T-11 Kansan, 1949–1951
- Douglas B-26 Invader, 1949–1951; 1953–1955, 1955–1957
- Douglas RB-26 Invader, 1954–1955
- Curtiss C-46 Commando, 1952–1955
- North American F-51 Mustang, 1953–1954
- North American TF-51 Mustang, 1953–1955
- North American T-28 Trojan, 1953–1954
- Beechcraft C-45, 1953–1955
- Lockheed T-33 T-Bird, 1954–1955
- Lockheed F-80 Shooting Star, 1954–1955
- Republic F-84 Thunderjet, 1954–1955
- Douglas C-47 Skytrain, 1955
- Fairchild C-119 Flying Boxcar, 1957–1966
- Fairchild C-123 Provider, 1981–1986
- Douglas C-124 Globemaster II, 1966–1972
- de Havilland Canada C-7 Caribou, 1972–1983
- Lockheed C-130 Hercules, 1981–present
