= Dobbins Air Reserve Base =

Military base in Georgia, USA

- Marietta, Georgia in the United States of America
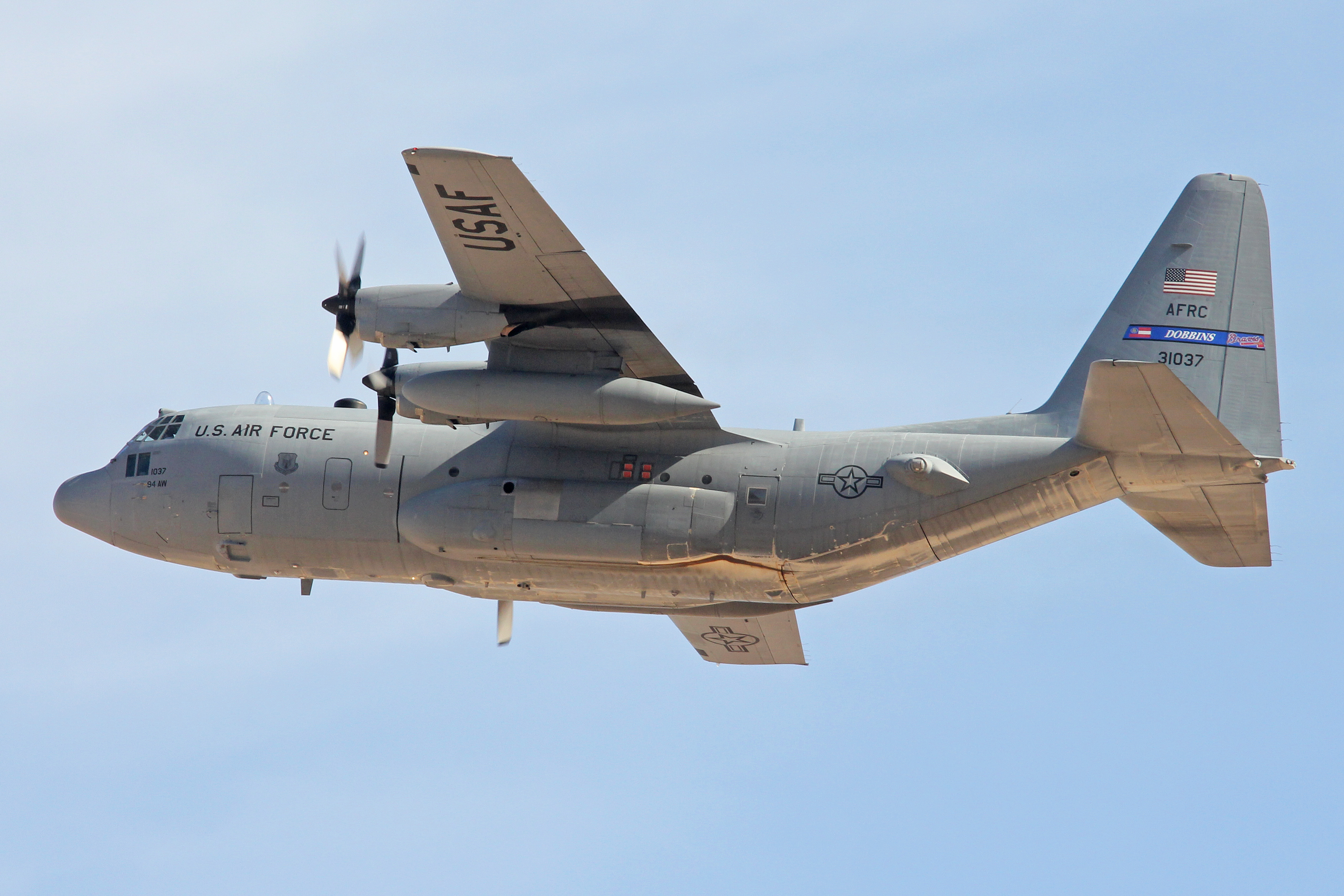
- A C-130 Hercules operated by the 700th Airlift Squadron, part of the 94th Airlift Wing based at Dobbins ARB.

Site information
- Type: US Air Force Base
- Owner: Department of Defense
- Operator: US Air Force
- Controlled by: Air Force Reserve Command (AFRC)
- Condition: Operational
- Website: www.afrc.af.mil/dobbins/

Location
- Location within Georgia Location within the United States Location within North America
- Coordinates: 33°54′55″N 084°30′59″W

Site history
- Built: 1941 (as Rickenbacker Field)
- In use: 1941 – present

Garrison information
- Current commander: Colonel Carl Magnusson
- Garrison: 94th Airlift Wing (Host)

Airfield information
- Identifiers: IATA: MGE, ICAO: KMGE, FAA LID: MGE, WMO: 722270
- Elevation: 325.5 metres (1,068 ft) AMSL
Runways
Direction	Length and surface
11/29	3,048.6 metres (10,002 ft) Concrete
110/290	1,065.2 metres (3,495 ft) Asphalt

Dobbins Air Reserve Base or Dobbins ARB (IATA: MGE, ICAO: KMGE, FAA LID: MGE) is a United States Air Force reserve air base located in unincorporated Cobb County, Georgia, about 20 miles (32 km) northwest of Atlanta. Originally known as Dobbins Air Force Base, it was named in honor of Captain Charles M. Dobbins, a World War II C-47 pilot who died near Sicily.

The installation is the home station of the host wing, the 94th Airlift Wing (94 AW) of the Air Force Reserve Command (AFRC) and its fleet of C-130 Hercules aircraft, and is also the location of the headquarters for AFRC's Twenty-Second Air Force (22 AF).

Dobbins ARB is also home to Army Aviation Service Facility #2 (AASF #2) of the Georgia Army National Guard and their fleet of UH-60 Blackhawks and UH-72 Lakota helicopters. Associated units to AASF #2 include 1st Battalion, 171st General Support Aviation Regiment; Company H, 171st Aviation Regiment; Company C, 2nd Battalion, 151st Aviation; and Detachment 1, Company C, 111th General Aviation Support Battalion, 111th Aviation Regiment.

Additional Reserve component organizations at Dobbins include various units of the Marine Corps Reserve and Navy Reserve.

Dobbins ARB has two runways which it shares with the General Lucius D. Clay National Guard Center (formerly Naval Air Station Atlanta) to its south. Runway 11/29 is the primary runway and is 10,000 feet (3,000 m) long and 300 feet (91 m) wide with directions 110 and 290 magnetic. The second runway, called an "assault strip", is a 3500×60-foot (1067×18-meter) runway referred to as 110–290, which is parallel to Runway 11/29.

Over 14,000 flight operations occur annually making the Dobbins complex an extremely active facility with diverse air traffic operations from all branches of the military and other US government agencies. This air traffic environment takes place within the area of the busiest airport in the world (Hartsfield-Jackson Atlanta International Airport) and is as busy as many medium-sized commercial airports.

== History ==
=== World War II ===
Originally intended by Cobb County, Georgia, as an alternative airfield for Atlanta's Candler Field, this airfield was constructed in 1941 as Rickenbacker Field. This was named for the former U.S. Army Air Corps top flying ace of World War I, Captain Eddie Rickenbacker.

The push to build this airport came in 1940 when President Franklin D. Roosevelt selected General Lucius D. Clay of the Army Air Corps to be the chief of the new Civil Aeronautics Administration (CAA), which was engaged in a huge program of airfield construction. About 450 to 500 of these were built in preparation for any possible war against the United States - from the east (Nazi Germany and Fascist Italy) or from the west (the Empire of Japan).

In 1940, the CAA offered to build a modern paved airport in Cobb County if the local governments provided the land. Due to the potential labor force for defense factories in this area, local officials also hoped to attract a large aircraft factory adjacent to the site. On October 24, the government of Cobb County announced the existence of this airport project, and it also revealed that purchase options had been signed for three prospective sites. The Atlanta City Council also passed a resolution endorsing this project on January 2, 1941. Since the Army Air Corps had recently taken over part of Candler Field (now Hartsfield–Jackson Atlanta International Airport), the principal municipal airport for Atlanta, the new airport in Cobb County was also seen as a reliever airport for Atlanta.

In May, the local government issued bonds to purchase 563 acres (228 ha) located 3 1/2 miles southeast of Marietta along the western side of the new four-lane superhighway, U.S. Highway 41, linking Marietta with Atlanta. The CAA next allocated $400,000 for construction of two 4,000-foot (1,200 m)-long runways on the land. The W. L. Florence Company of Powder Springs, Georgia, the low bidder with a bid of $290,000, won the contract. This bid, well below the estimated cost of $400,000, allowed the CAA to add the third runway to this construction project. The construction began on 14 July 1941. In the next month, the Gulf Oil Corporation and Georgia Air Services agreed to lease the airport, once completed, for $12,000 per year. In September 1941, Eddie Rickenbacker, America's leading flying ace of World War I, and then the president and general manager of Eastern Airlines, agreed to have this airport named Rickenbacker Field in his honor. In the same month, the U.S. Navy requested permission to use this airport for the flight training of Naval aviators. (The Navy had established the "Naval Aviation Reserve Base Atlanta", at what is now the DeKalb-Peachtree Airport, in March 1941.) In October, Georgia Air Services signed a $70,000 contract for two 180x160-ft. airplane hangars to be built. Although it was far from completion, the dedication of this airfield took place in October 1941

After the Japanese attack on Pearl Harbor, work on this new airfield accelerated rapidly. In January 1942, Lawrence Dale Bell, the founder and president of the Bell Aircraft Company, inspected this site for a proposed government-financed airplane factory for the Department of War. Meanwhile, the Department of the Navy announced its intention to take over the new airfield as an auxiliary naval air station. The Navy shortly began land-condemnation proceedings.

The Department of War, in turn, announced that it would not contest the wish of the Department of the Navy to take over Rickenbacker Field, and that it would build its new factory elsewhere. The Cobb County government appealed to the Secretary of the Navy, Frank Knox, urging him to change the Navy's plans. Since other options were available for flight training. Secretary Knox relinquished the Navy's claim on this airfield and left it to the Army Air Forces. (During World War II, the Navy established an auxiliary naval air station at Gainesville, Georgia, just northeast of Atlanta.)

On January 23, 1942, the Bell Aircraft Company and the Department of War announced that an aircraft factory employing up to 40,000 workers would be built near Marietta. Also, the Department of War announced on February 19 that "Rickenbacker Field" would be renamed the Marietta Army Airfield. Although its construction began in March 1942, its official ground-breaking ceremony took place in May 1942, with Captain Rickenbacker present. Rickenbacker went on to establish and pay for an aviation educational program to train workers for both civil aviation and military aviation. Also in 1942, the City of Atlanta began work on its contribution: a pipeline to supply the new factory with water from the Chattahoochee River.

In addition to taking over Rickenbacker Field, the United States Army Air Forces (USAAF) purchased a parcel of land just north of the airfield for a cantonment area. The Marietta Army Airfield was activated on June 6, 1943, with its personnel housed in tents as part of the 58th Bombardment Operational Training Wing. At the end of June 1943, there were 42 officers and 356 enlisted men stationed here.

The mission of the Marietta Army Airfield was acceptance testing of B-29 Superfortress heavy bombers for the USAAF, the modification of B-29s, and the operation of an Army Air Depot. Barracks for the soldiers reached completion in November 1943. By January 1, 1944, the number of soldiers stationed here had risen to 73 officers and 1,263 enlisted men. For a period of time, the Marietta Army Airfield was assigned to the USAAF's Second Air Force under the XX Bomber Command. On 12 April 1944, the Marietta Army Airfield was reassigned to the "17th Bombardment Operation Training Unit".

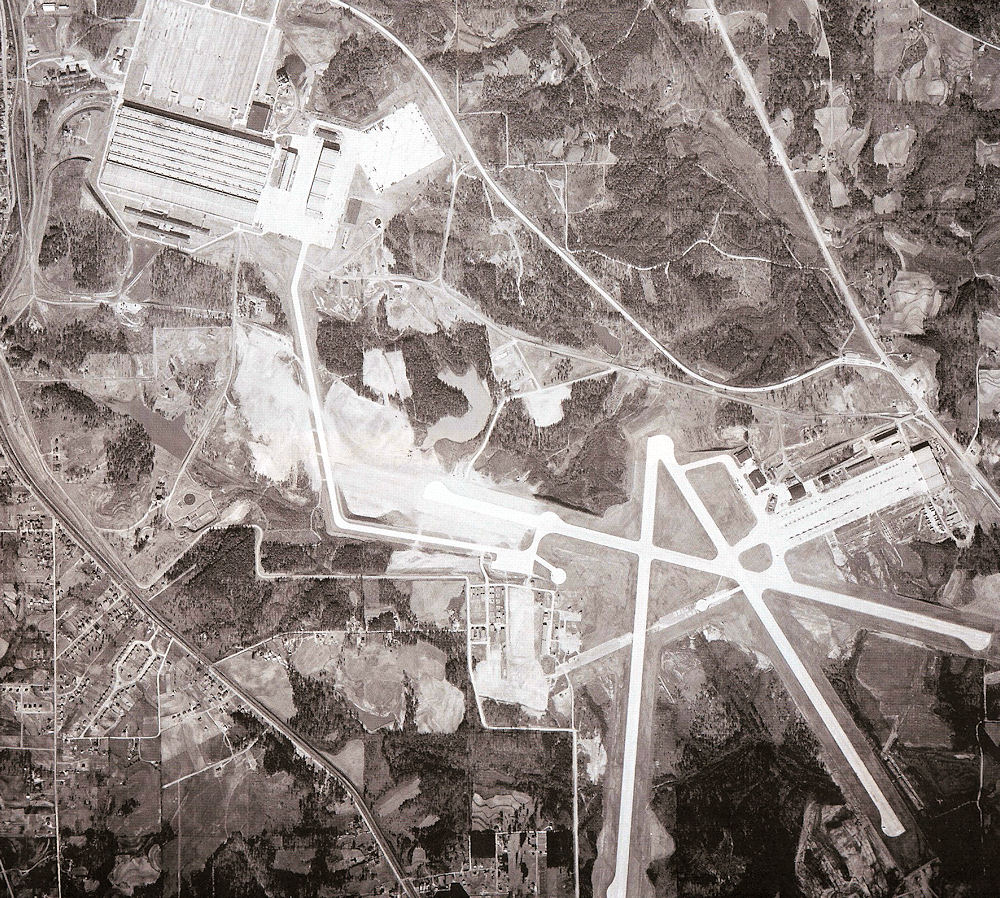
Marietta Army Airfield and the Defense Production Plant #6, 1944

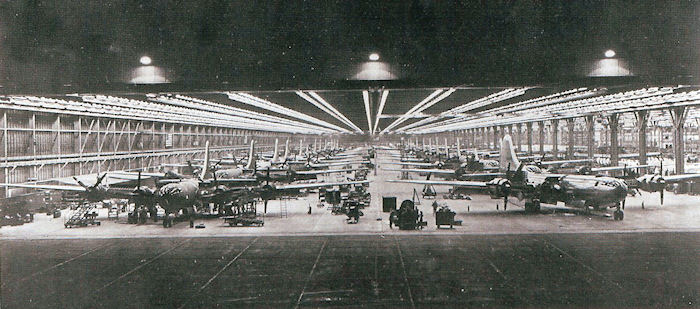
B-29s on the night production line at Bell Aircraft, Atlanta, 1944

In the spring of 1943 the adjacent Bell Aircraft Company's factory, an additional plant (besides a pair of Boeing plants Renton, Washington and Wichita, Kansas (former Stearman Aircraft) and a Martin plant at Offutt Field, Omaha, Nebraska) for manufacturing B-29 Superfortresses was completed. The "Defense Plant Corporation" of the Department of War paid for the construction of this factory, and the department called it "Plant #6". Bell Aircraft completed its first B-29 on schedule, and this was first test-flown on November 4, 1943. The production of B-29s at this factory increased slowly during 1944, and by the fall of 1944, Bell Aircraft's output of new B-29s began to meet and exceed the goals of the Department of War.

By January 1945, Bell Aircraft had completed 357 B-29A's. After the completion of the last one of these, the production in Marietta was switched to the B-29B Superfortress, which was a simplified version of the B-29 without the computerized gun system and other components that raised the allowable bomb load from 11,000 to 18,000 pounds. The new B-29B radar, mounted in a wing-shaped radome under the fuselage, gave much better images of the ground. The 315th Bombardment Wing based at Northwest Field, Guam, received most of the B-29Bs for night low altitude pathfinder led missions against Japan. Bell built a total of 311 B-29Bs before the plant closed in January 1946. At its height, the Bell Bomber plant employed 28,263.

=== Post-war ===
Marietta Army Airfield remained open after the war and became the home of Georgia Air National Guard (ANG) and Air Force Reserve units. The first post-war ANG unit, the 128th Fighter Squadron, activated at Marietta on 20 August 1946, with P-47 Thunderbolts. This was followed by the activation of the headquarters of the 116th Fighter Group on 9 September and the activation of the headquarters of the 54th Fighter Wing which commanded 56 units of the Air National Guard throughout the Southeastern states.

In 1948, part of the land and barracks at the original Naval Air Station Atlanta in nearby Chamblee were given to the state for the purpose of creating an engineering technology school that could rapidly train returning soldiers for civilian work in various technical fields.

Also in 1948 the airfield became Marietta Air Force Base as a result of the creation of the United States Air Force. In 1950, the Air Force renamed the base Dobbins Air Force Base in honor of Captain Charles M. Dobbins of Marietta, a World War II transport pilot. Captain Dobbins died near Sicily on July 11, 1943, when US Navy gunners who had earlier suffered a Luftwaffe (German air force) attack mistakenly downed his C-47. He was flying his third mission of the day, dropping paratroopers.

Following the war, the Bell Aircraft Plant #6 remained closed for five years. In 1951, Lockheed Aircraft Corporation took over the plant to modify B-29s for the Korean War. Lockheed also went on to build 394 B-47 Stratojets at the plant under license from Boeing. Additionally, Lockheed also conducted a B-47 modification program at Marietta. To handle the B-47 production and modification work, the airfield received a 10,000 × 300 ft (91 m) runway. Over the years, the Lockheed plant constructed the Lockheed JetStar business jet (C-140), C-130 Hercules, C-141 Starlifter, and C-5 Galaxy.

In 1957, Naval Air Station Atlanta (NAS Atlanta) at the present day Peachtree-DeKalb Airport in nearby Chamblee moved to Dobbins AFB. The Navy constructed a cantonment area on the southwest portion of Dobbins AFB for their use.

In 1962, the Southern Technical Institute (now part of Kennesaw State University) began classes on land given to the University System of Georgia by Dobbins AFB four years prior.

In June 1992 the official name was changed from Dobbins Air Force Base to Dobbins Air Reserve Base (Dobbins ARB). In 2003, the Air Force Reserve Command changed the name again to Dobbins Joint Air Reserve Base (Dobbins JARB). However, with the closure of the NAS Atlanta on 29 September 2009, the name reverted to Dobbins Air Reserve Base once again.

In September 2005, the 53rd Weather Reconnaissance Squadron Hurricane Hunter aircraft flew out of Dobbins JARB after Hurricane Katrina did major damage to their normal home at Keesler Air Force Base in Biloxi, Mississippi. Numerous evacuees also came to metro Atlanta through Dobbins JARB, including many medevaced medical patients taken in by local hospitals.

Over the years, a wide variety of U.S. Army Air Forces and U.S. Air Force aircraft have been stationed at Dobbins AFB with the Air Force Reserve and the Air National Guard, including the P-51 Mustang, F-51 Mustang, F-84 Thunderstreak, F-86 Sabre, C-97 Stratocruiser, C-123 Provider, C-124 Globemaster II, F-100 Super Sabre, F-105 Thunderchief, F-4 Phantom II, C-7 Caribou, C-130 Hercules and the F-15 Eagle. Naval aircraft have included the A-4 Skyhawk, A-7 Corsair II, A-6 Intruder, F/A-18 Hornet and C-9 Skytrain II of the U.S. Navy and OV-10 Bronco, AH-1 SeaCobra, UH-1 Huey and F/A-18 Hornet aircraft of the U.S. Marine Corps.

== Current and future use ==
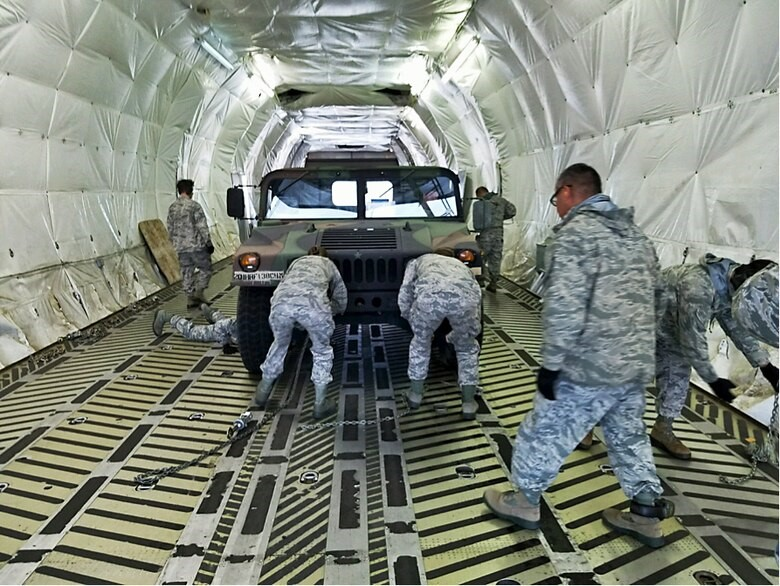
Members of the U.S. Air Force Reserve's 38th Aerial Port Squadron practice uploading cargo at Dobbins' Transportation Proficiency Center prior to the unit's 2017 deployment to Kuwait.

In 1995, Lockheed merged with Martin Marietta to become Lockheed Martin. The C-130 Hercules remains in production 60 years after the first one rolled out in 1955. Work also continues on the F-22 Raptor and the Joint Strike Fighter. Dobbins ARB has its own ZIP code, 30069, and Lockheed Martin also has its own ZIP code, 30063, however, Marietta is the only place name (city) considered acceptable by the United States Postal Service for the latter.

Dobbins ARB is also an automated weather station, reporting five minutes before every hour. Until sometime in 2008, it only reported from 7am to 11pm (6:55 to 10:55/22:55), although it occasionally reported overnight during unusual weather conditions, such as strong winds due to the 2004 hurricanes (Frances, Jeanne, Ivan). Local conditions shown on The Weather Channel (TWC) and Weatherscan are now taken from a different system set up by TWC during the mid-2000s (decade); until then, overnight conditions for local cable TV systems came from Fulton County Airport.

Like most U.S. bases, Dobbins ARB has had to fend off several attempts at closing it, as part of streamlining the country's military and reducing unnecessary spending. Development has steadily encroached upon the base since the war. 1978 OV-1 Mohawk 1989 A-7 Corsair II and 1993 C-130 Hercules plane crashes into residential areas near the base raised questions of safety in having a base in such a densely populated suburban area. The airfield now sits in a vast sea of urban development; flying demonstrations at air shows were discontinued some years ago because of safety concerns, although the Navy hosted air shows in 2004 and 2006, and the Air Force side hosted air shows in 2008 and 2010 (2008 marked the first time in over 15 years of a USAF Thunderbirds performance at KMGE).

Public complaints about the noise continue, and attempts to close the facility have been thwarted so far by powerful local politicians, such as former U.S. Senator Sam Nunn in 1995. However, some have proposed that it again become a commercial airport, as it was originally envisioned (there have been calls for Dobbins ARB to become the second major commercial airport in metro Atlanta, to be a major reliever to Hartsfield–Jackson Atlanta International Airport, the busiest airport in the world).

Dobbins ARB is the only U.S. military facility left in northern Georgia after the 2005 Base Realignment and Closure Commission (BRAC) recommendations were enacted. The Georgia Air National Guard transferred to Robins AFB in 1996, leaving Air Force Reserve C-130s as the only Air Force flying unit at the base. The 248th Medical Company (Air Ambulance) and elements of the 151st Aviation Regiment of the Army National Guard are also based there. More units relocated to Dobbins ARB as the Georgia Army National Guard took over NAS Atlanta as the latter closed due to BRAC and became a tenant non-flying command known as Navy Operational Support Center Atlanta.

Dobbins is also the home of the U.S. Air Force Reserve's Transportation Proficiency Center which provides accelerated training for Airmen joining the Air Force Reserve in transportation career fields, specialized skill training, and pre-mobilization readiness training for Reserve component transportation Airmen called to active duty service.

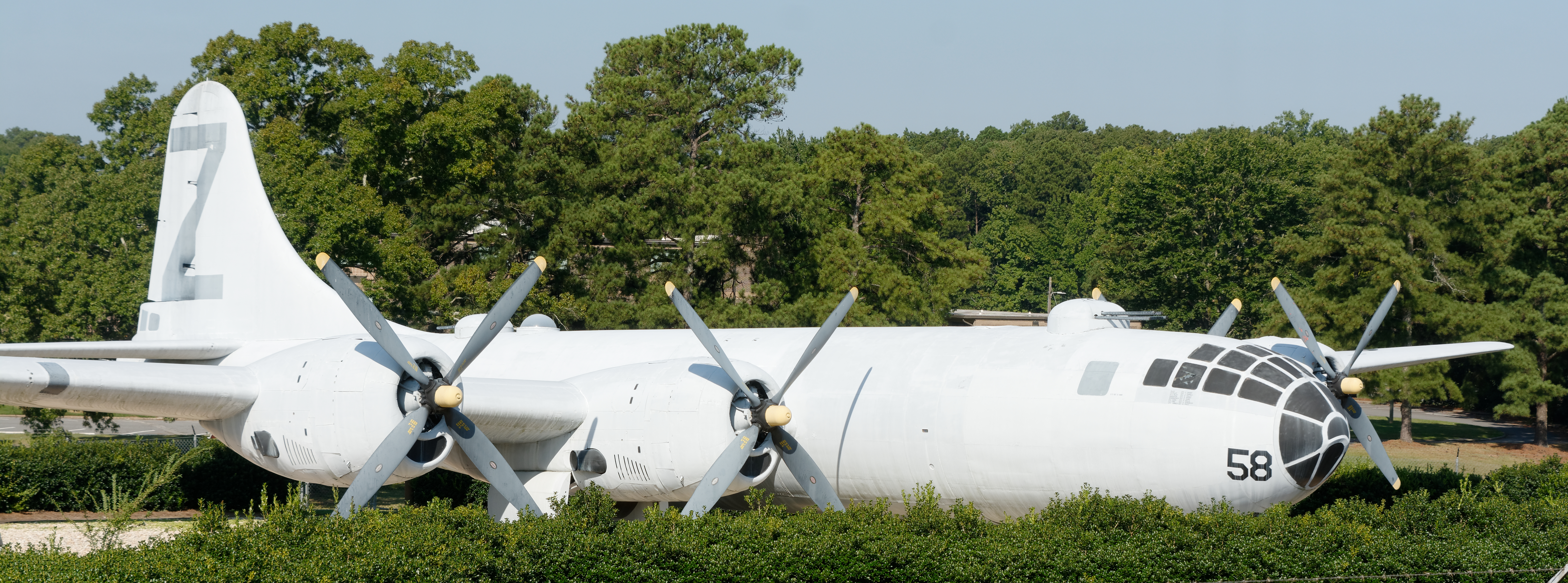
B-29 near the main gate

Near Dobbins ARB's main gate stands a Wichita-built B-29 named "Sweet Eloise" (B-29-80-BW, AAF Ser. No. 44-70113), which is on public display as a memorial to World War II bomber production at the site. However, at least two Marietta-built B-29s have survived the years. One is on display at the Georgia Veterans State Park near Cordele (B-29A-15-BN, AAF Ser. No. 42-93967) and the other (B-29B-55-BA, AAF Ser. No. 44-84053) is located at Robins Air Force Base's Museum of Flight in Warner Robins, Georgia.

=== Major Commands to which assigned ===
- AAF Air Service Command, October 13, 1942
- Commanding General, Army Air Forces, September 27, 1943
- Second Air Force, January 14, 1944
- AAF Materiel Command, July 15, 1944
- AAF Materiel and Services, July 17, 1944

Redesignated: AAF Technical Service Command, August 31, 1944

- Air Technical Service Command, July 1, 1945
- Air Materiel Command, March 9, 1946
- Air Defense Command, June 25, 1946
- Continental Air Command, May 10, 1949
- Air Force Reserve, August 1, 1968

Redesignated: Air Force Reserve Command, February 17, 1997–present

=== Major Units assigned ===
- 522d Base HQ and Air Base Squadron, June 10, 1943 – March 25, 1944
- 292d Army Air Force Base Unit, March 25, 1944 – May 31, 1946
- 54th Fighter (later Troop Carrier) Wing, October 2, 1946 – October 11, 1950
- 4204th Army Air Force (later Air Force) Base Unit, May 31, 1946 – December 14, 1958
- 94th Bombardment Group, May 29, 1947 – March 20, 1951

Established as: 94th Bombardment (later Tactical Reconnaissance) Wing, June 26, 1949 – May 18, 1955

- 514th Troop Carrier Group, May 29, 1947 – June 26, 1949
- 35th Air Division, September 4, 1951 – November 15, 1958
- 902d Reserve Training Wing, December 19, 1951 – June 13, 1952
- 116th Tactical Fighter Wing (Various Designations), July 10, 1952 – 1996
- 2589th Air Reserve Combat Training Center, November 1, 1953 – December 27, 1961
- 445th Troop Carrier Wing (Various Designations), September 6, 1957 – June 29, 1971
- 918th Troop Carrier Group (Various Designations), January 15, 1963 – September 1, 1975
- 94th Tactical Airlift Wing / 94th Airlift Wing (Various Designations), July 1, 1972 – Present
- Fourteenth Air Force, October 8, 1976 – July 1, 1993

== Based units ==
Flying and notable non-flying units based at Dobbins Air Reserve Base.

=== United States Air Force ===
Air Force Reserve Command (AFRC)

- Twenty-Second Air Force
  - Headquarters Twenty-Second Air Force
  - 94th Airlift Wing (Host Wing)
    - 94th Operations Group
      - 94th Aeromedical Evacuation
      - 94th Airlift Control Flight
      - 700th Airlift Squadron – C-130H Hercules
      - 94th Operations Support Squadron
    - 94th Mission Support Group
      - 80th Aerial Port Squadron
      - 94th Aerial Port Squadron
      - 94th Mission Support Squadron
      - 94th Security Forces Squadron
      - 94th Logistic Readiness Squadron
      - 94th Civil Engineering Squadron
      - 94th Force Support Squadron
      - 94th Communications Squadron
    - 94th Maintenance Group
      - 94th Maintenance Squadron
      - 94th Aircraft Maintenance Squadron
    - 94th Aeromedical Staging Squadron

=== United States Marine Corps ===
Marine Forces Reserve

- 4th Marine Logistics Group
  - Combat Logistics Regiment 45
    - Combat Logistics Battalion 25
    - Combat Logistics Battalion 451

=== United States Army ===
Army National Guard (ARNG)

Georgia Army National Guard

78th Aviation Troop Command

- 111th Aviation Regiment
  - 1st Battalion (General Support)
    - Company C
- 151st Aviation Regiment
  - 2nd Battalion (Service & Support)
- 171st Aviation Regiment
  - 1st Battalion (General Support)
  - Company H
- Detachment 9, Operational Airlift

=== United States Navy ===
US Navy Reserve

- Navy Operational Support Center (NOSC) Atlanta

=== National Guard ===
Georgia National Guard

- Headquarters Georgia National Guard

== See also ==
- Georgia World War II Army Airfields
- Air Technical Service Command
- Central Air Defense Force (Air Defense Command)

== Sources ==
- Maurer, Maurer (1983). Air Force Combat Units Of World War II. Maxwell AFB, Alabama: Office of Air Force History. ISBN 0-89201-092-4.
- Maurer, Maurer, ed. (1982) [1969]. Combat Squadrons of the Air Force, World War II (PDF) (reprint ed.). Washington, DC: Office of Air Force History. ISBN 0-405-12194-6. LCCN 70605402. OCLC 72556.
- Shettle, M. L. (2005), Georgia's Army Airfields of World War II. ISBN 0-9643388-3-1
