= Fourth Air Force =

United States Air Force numbered unit

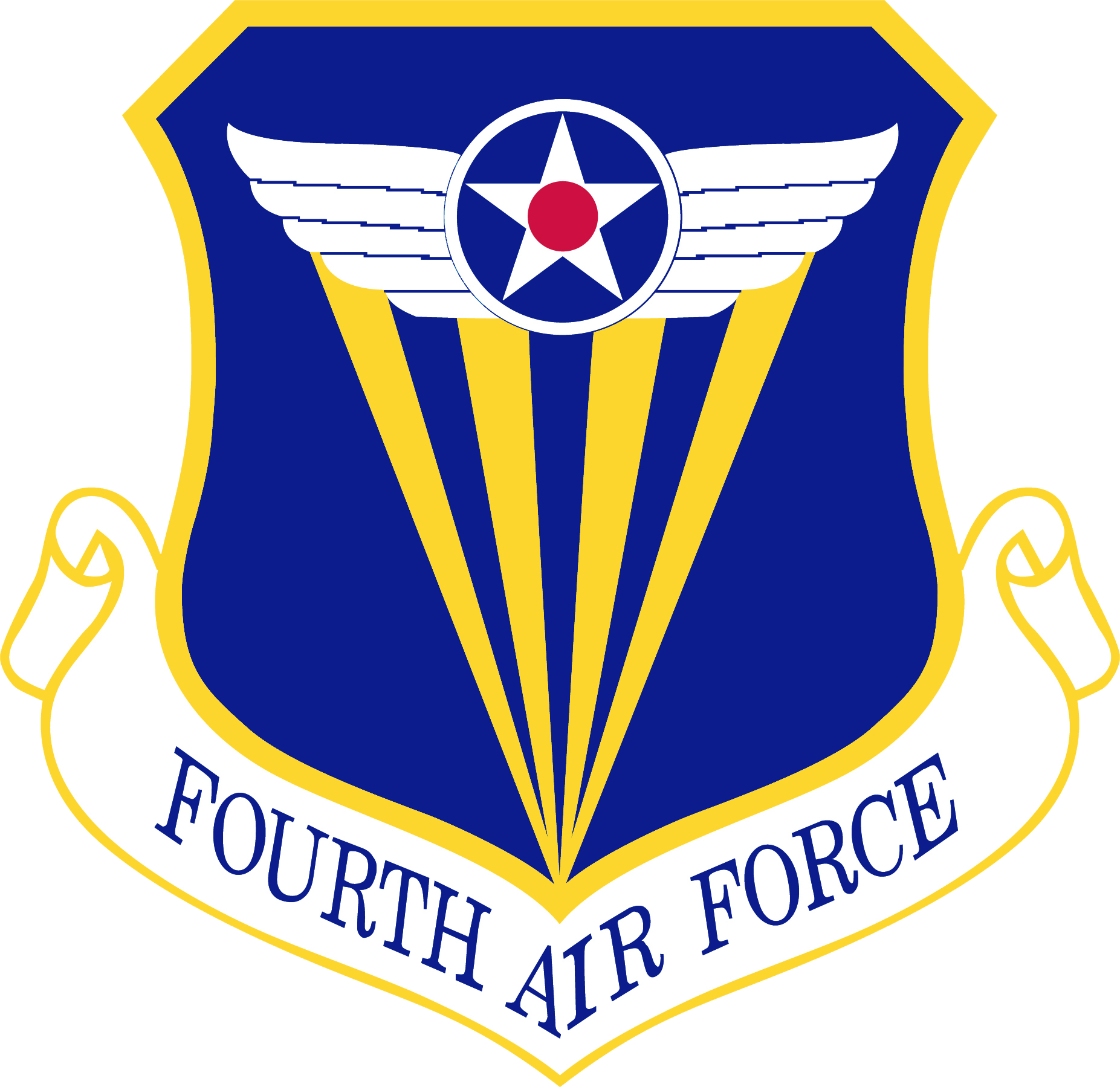
- Shield of the Fourth Air Force
- Active: 1 December 1985 - present (as Fourth Air Force); 24 September 1976 – 1 December 1985 (as Fourth Air Force (Reserve)); 20 January 1966 - 30 September 1969; 18 September 1942 – 1 September 1960 (as Fourth Air Force); 26 March 1941 – 18 September 1942 (as 4 Air Force); 19 October 1940 – 26 March 1941 (as Southwest Air District) (85 years, 10 months)
- Country: United States of America
- Branch: United States Air Force (18 September 1947 – present); United States Army ( Army Air Forces, 20 June 1941 – 18 September 1947; Army Air Corps 19 October 1940 – 20 June 1941)
- Type: Numbered Air Force
- Role: Provide combat-ready reserve air mobility and support forces
- Part of: Air Force Reserve Command
- Headquarters: March Air Reserve Base, California, U.S.
- Engagements: World War II – American Theater

- Decorations: Air Force Outstanding Unit Award
- Website: www.4af.afrc.af.mil

Commanders
- Commander: Maj Gen Paul Fast
- Vice Commander: Col Cynthia A. Welch
- Command Chief: CCM Karie A. Contreras
- Notable commanders: Carroll W. McColpin; Benjamin H. King

The Fourth Air Force (4 AF) is a numbered air force of the Air Force Reserve Command (AFRC). It is headquartered at March Air Reserve Base, California.

4 AF directs the activities and supervises the training of more than 30,000 Air Force Reservists. If called to active duty, 4 AF's ready reserve units would be assigned to Air Mobility Command, Air Education and Training Command, and Pacific Air Forces. Several airfields are associated with the Fourth Air Force.

One of the four original pre–World War II numbered air forces, 4 AF was activated on 18 December 1940, at March Field, California with a mission of air defense of the Southwestern United States and Lower Midwest regions. During the war, its primary mission became the organization and training of combat units prior to their deployment to the overseas combat air forces.

4 AF is commanded by Major General Paul Fast.

== Units ==
Fourth Air Force flying units include one unit-equipped air mobility and two unit-equipped airlift wings, five unit-equipped air refueling wings, three associate air mobility wings, two associate airlift wings and one associate air refueling wing.

- Headquarters, Fourth Air Force, March ARB, California
- 315th Airlift Wing, Charleston AFB, South Carolina

C-17 Globemaster III

- 349th Air Mobility Wing, Travis AFB, California

C-5 Galaxy, KC-46 Pegasus, C-17 Globemaster III

- 433d Airlift Wing, Lackland AFB, Texas

C-5 Galaxy

- 434th Air Refueling Wing, Grissom ARB, Indiana

KC-135R Stratotanker

- 439th Airlift Wing, Westover ARB, Massachusetts

C-5 Galaxy

- 445th Airlift Wing, Wright-Patterson AFB, Ohio

C-17 Globemaster III

- 446th Airlift Wing, McChord AFB, Washington

C-17 Globemaster III

- 452d Air Mobility Wing, March ARB, California

C-17 Globemaster III, KC-135R Stratotanker

- 459th Air Refueling Wing, Andrews AFB, Maryland

KC-135R Stratotanker

- 507th Air Refueling Wing, Tinker AFB, Oklahoma

KC-135R Stratotanker

- 512th Airlift Wing, Dover AFB, Delaware

C-5 Galaxy, C-17 Globemaster III

- 514th Airlift Wing, McGuire AFB, New Jersey

C-17 Globemaster III

- 624th Regional Support Group, Hickam AFB, Hawaii
- 914th Air Refueling Wing, Niagara Falls Air Reserve Station, New York

KC-135R Stratotanker

- 916th Air Refueling Wing, Seymour Johnson AFB, North Carolina

KC-135R Stratotanker

- 927th Air Refueling Wing, MacDill AFB, Florida

KC-135R Stratotanker

- 931st Air Refueling Wing, McConnell AFB, Kansas

KC-135R Stratotanker

- 940th Air Refueling Wing, Beale AFB, California

KC-135R Stratotanker

- 911th Airlift Wing, Pittsburgh IAP Air Reserve Station, Pennsylvania

C-17 Globemaster III

== History ==
One of the four original numbered air forces, Fourth Air Force was activated as the Southwest Air District of the GHQ Air Force on 18 December 1940, at March Field, California. It was redesignated Fourth Air Force on 26 March 1941 with a mission for the defense of the Southwest and Lower Midwest regions of the United States.

=== World War II ===
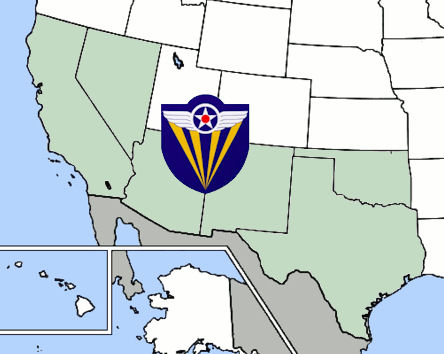
Fourth Air Force region of the United States, early World War II

During World War II Fourth Air Force was the primary air defense command for the West Coast. The command also flew antisubmarine patrols along coastal areas of the Gulf of Mexico from after Pearl Harbor until October 1942. One of its primary fighter units was the 10th Fighter Wing at Hamilton Field, California.

On 29 September 1942, Rice Municipal Airport located in the Desert Training Center was acquired by the IV Air Support Command, and was operational by 26 October 1942. Re-designated Rice AAF it was used to train pilots and crews of aircraft whose mission it was to support ground troops.

Beginning in May 1942, the mission of Fourth Air Force became operational training of units and crews, and the replacement training of individuals for bombardment, fighter, and reconnaissance operations. It received graduates of Army Air Forces Training Command flight schools; navigator training; flexible gunnery schools and various technical schools, organized them into newly activated combat groups and squadrons, and provided operational unit training (OTU) and replacement training (RTU) to prepare groups and replacements for deployment overseas to combat theaters. The Fourth Air Force became predominantly a fighter OTU and RTU organization. Most P-51 Mustang and P-38 Lightning groups were trained by Fourth Air Force primarily due to the proximity of their manufacturing plants in Southern California. By 1944, most of the Operational Training of groups ended, with the command concentrating on RTU training of individual replacements using Army Air Force Base Units (AAFBU) as training organizations at the airfields controlled by Fourth Air Force.

Air Defense Wings were also organized for the major metropolitan areas along the West Coast, using training units attached to the Wings. By 1944 the likelihood of a full-scale air attack along the West Coast since the bombing of Dutch Harbor two years earlier was remote, and these air defense wings were reduced to paper units.

On 13 December 1944, First, Second, Third and Fourth Air Force were all placed under the unified command of the Continental Air Forces.

=== Air Defense Command ===
In March 1946, USAAF Chief General Carl Spaatz had undertaken a major re-organization of the postwar USAAF that had included the establishment of Major Commands (MAJCOM), who would report directly to HQ United States Army Air Forces. Continental Air Forces was inactivated, and Fourth Air Force was assigned to the postwar Air Defense Command in March 1946 and subsequently to Continental Air Command (ConAC) in December 1948 being primarily concerned with air defense.

The command was headquartered at Hamilton AFB, California and originally assigned the region of the CONUS west of the Rocky Mountains, roughly from the Pacific Ocean coast east to the eastern borders of, and . It was also responsible for training Air Force Reserve and Air National Guard personnel throughout the region.

By 1949 with the establishment of the Western Air Defense Force (WADF), the air defense mission of the command was transferred to WADF, leaving Fourth AF free to focus on its reserve training tasks, which it did for the next decade. On 1 September 1960, Air Defense Command inactivated Fourth Air Force, transferring its reserve training mission to the Sixth Air Force Reserve Region.

Fourth Air Force was re-activated on 20 January 1966 again at Hamilton AFB, as part of Air Defense Command with the inactivation of its organization of Air Defense Sectors. Its area of responsibility was essentially unchanged from its 1948 region. Subordinate organizations assigned by ADC were the 25th 26th and 27th Air Divisions.

On 16 January 1968 Air Defense Command was re-designated Aerospace Defense Command (ADCOM) as part of a restructuring of USAF air defense forces. Fourth Air Force's second period of service was short-lived, however, and the command was again inactivated as the result of a major ADCOM reorganization on 31 December 1969 of the First Fourth, Tenth Air Forces and several Air Divisions. This reorganization was the result of the need to eliminate intermediate levels of command in ADCOM driven by budget reductions and a perceived lessening of the need for continental air defense against attacking Soviet aircraft.

ADCOM reassigned the units under the inactivated Fourth Air Force were reassigned primarily to the 25th and 26th Air Divisions.

=== Air Force Reserve ===
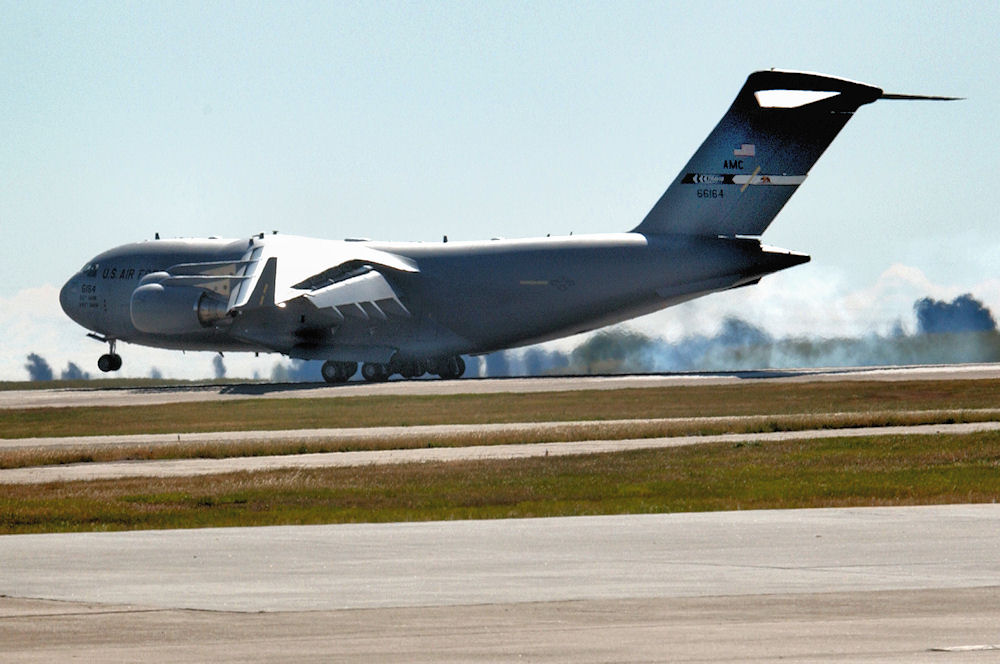
The newest Boeing C-17A Globemaster III, 06-6164, arrives at Travis AFB

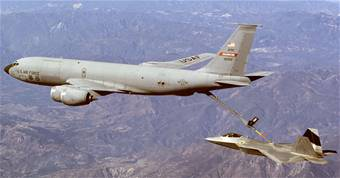
A KC-135R Stratotanker from the 434th Air Refueling Wing refuels an F-22A from the 1st Fighter Wing, Langley Air Force Base, Virginia

The command remained inactive until 8 October 1976, when it was activated as Fourth Air Force (Reserve) at McClellan Air Force Base, CA, and assigned to the Air Force Reserve. Fourth Air Force has been a key component of the Air Force reserve ever since.

Fourth Air Force personnel supported operations in Grenada (Operation Urgent Fury) and Panama (Operation Just Cause). More than 8,000 Air Force Reservists assigned to Fourth Air Force units served in the United States, Europe, and the Persian Gulf during Operation Desert Shield and Desert Storm. This included more than 2,878 medical personnel assigned to Fourth Air Force units.

Since the end of the Cold War, Fourth Air Force has supported humanitarian missions such as Provide Promise in the Balkans and Provide Relief and Restore Hope in Somalia. Units rushed to provide aid and rescue service to the residents of Florida, the Gulf Coast, and the Caribbean in the aftermath of the traumatic and prolonged 1995 hurricane season. It supported immediate assistance to aid victims and disaster officials following the bombing of the Oklahoma City Federal Building. Fourth Air Force units provided assistance for several natural disasters, including the 1994 Northridge earthquake in the Los Angeles area, and the catastrophic midwest floods and the California wildfires in 1993.

Fourth Air Force units routinely support United Nations and Department of State missions. Fourth Air Force people were on the first teams into Haiti for Operation Uphold Democracy, and supported Vigilant Warrior and Desert Thunder deployments to Southwest Asia. The men and women of Fourth Air Force continue to perform international peacekeeping and humanitarian missions on an almost daily basis. Headquarters Fourth Air Force officially returned to its original home, now March Air Reserve Base, in Riverside, CA, in April, 1998.

In 2003 Fourth Air Force became an intermediate echelon responsible primarily for all Air Mobility Command gained AFRC air refueling units in the United States and AMC gained AFRC strategic airlift units in the western United States. Today the sixty person staff consists of Traditional Reservists, Air Reserve Technicians and civilian employees. They direct the activities and supervise the equipping and training of more than 30,000 Air Force reservists in unit programs located across the continental United States, Alaska, Hawaii and Guam. Reservists from 4 AF units were routinely deployed with Air Expeditionary units to fight in the Afghanistan War (2001-2021); the Iraq War (2003-2011); and later anti-ISIS (Daesh) operations.

=== Lineage ===
- Established as Southwest Air District on 19 October 1940

Activated on 18 December 1940
Redesignated: 4 Air Force on 26 March 1941
Redesignated; Fourth Air Force on 18 September 1942
Discontinued, and inactivated on 1 September 1960

- Activated on 20 January 1966

Organized on 1 April 1966
Inactivated on 30 September 1969

- Redesignated Fourth Air Force (Reserve) on 24 September 1976

Activated in the Reserve on 8 October 1976
Redesignated Fourth Air Force on 1 December 1985.

=== Assignments ===
- General Headquarters Air Force (later, Air Force Combat Command), 18 December 1940
- Western Defense Command, 11 December 1941
- United States Army Air Forces, 10 September 1943
- Continental Air Forces, 13 December 1944
- Air Defense Command, 21 March 1946
- Continental Air Command, 1 December 1948 – 1 September 1960
- Air (later, Aerospace) Defense Command, 20 January 1966 – 30 September 1969
- Air Force Reserve (later, Air Force Reserve Command), 8 October 1976 – .

=== Stations ===
- March Field, California, 18 December 1940
- Riverside, California, 20 January 1941
- Hamilton Field, California, 7 December 1941
- San Francisco, California, 5 January 1942
- Hamilton Field (later, AFB), California, 19 June 1946 – 1 September 1960; 1 April 1966 – 30 September 1969
- McClellan Air Force Base, California, 8 October 1976
- March ARB, California, 1 April 1998 – present

=== Components ===
==== Commands ====
- I Staging: 19 November 1945 – 3 April 1946
- 4th Air Force Service (later, 4th Air Force Base; IV Air Force Base): 1 October 1941 – 31 March 1942
- 4th Air Support (later, IV Air Support; IV Ground Air Support): 3 September 1941 – 17 August 1942
- 4th Antiaircraft: 1 May 1944 – 6 February 1946
- Bomber Command, 4th Air Force (later, 4th Bomber, IV Bomber): 11 April – 19 September 1941; 19 September 1941 – 31 March 1944
- Interceptor Command, 4th Air Force (later, 4th Interceptor, IV Interceptor; IV Fighter): 22 April – 8 July 1941; 8 July 1941 – 31 March 1944.
- IV Emergency Rescue (Provisional): 30 December 1943 – 22 January 1944.
- Antiaircraft Artillery (Provisional): 27 December 1943 – 30 April 1944.

==== Regions ====
- Los Angeles Air Defense Region: 1 Jul 1944 – 31 Aug 1945
- San Francisco Air Defense Region: 1 Jul 1944 – 31 Aug 1945
- Seattle Air Defense Region: 1 Jul 1944 – 31 Aug 1945
- Sixth Air Force Reserve Region: 1 Jul – 1 Sep 1960.

==== District ====
- 4th Air Reserve District: 1 Dec 1951 – 1 Apr 1954.

==== Air Divisions ====
- 25th Air Division (later, 25th Air): 25 October 1948 – 1 April 1949; 8 July 1949 – 1 August 1950 (detached 10 November 1949 – 1 August 1950); 1 April 1966 – 15 September 1969.
- 26th Air Division: 1 April 1966 – 30 September 1969.
- 27th Air Division: 1 April 1966 – 15 September 1969
- 28th Air Division: 8 December 1949 – 1 August 1950 (detached 1 January – 1 August 1950).

==== Sectors ====
- Los Angeles Air Defense Sector: 1 Apr – 25 Jun 1966
- Reno Air Defense Sector: 1 Apr – 25 Jun 1966

==== Wing ====
- 552d Airborne Early Warning and Control Wing, 1 April 1966 – 15 September 1969

==== Groups (incomplete) ====
- 64th Transport Group, 4 December 1940 – 31 March 1942
- 473d Fighter Group, 1 November 1943 – 31 March 1944

== List of commanders ==
=== Fourth Air Force (1940–1960) ===
No.	Commander		Term		
No.	Portrait	Name	Took office	Left office	Term length
1	Jacob E. Fickel	Major General; Jacob E. Fickel	18 December 1940	2 April 1942	1 year, 105 days
2	George C. Kenney	Major General; George C. Kenney	2 April 1942	22 July 1942	111 days
3	Barney M. Giles	Major General; Barney M. Giles	22 July 1942	18 March 1943	239 days
4	William E. Kepner	Major General; William E. Kepner	18 March 1943	8 July 1943	112 days
5	William E. Lynd	Major General; William E. Lynd	8 July 1943	14 July 1944	1 year, 6 days
6	James E. Parker	Major General; James E. Parker	14 July 1944	3 January 1945	173 days
-	Auby C. Strickland	Brigadier General; Auby C. Strickland; Acting	3 January 1945	25 January 1945	22 days
6	James E. Parker	Major General; James E. Parker	25 January 1945	19 May 1945	114 days
-	Edward M. Morris	Brigadier General; Edward M. Morris; Acting	19 May 1945	6 July 1945	48 days
7	Willis H. Hale	Major General; Willis H. Hale	6 July 1945	1 November 1947	2 years, 118 days
-	Ned Schramm	Brigadier General; Ned Schramm; Acting	1 November 1947	20 January 1948	80 days
8	John E. Upston	Major General; John E. Upston	20 January 1948	c. 30 September 1950	c. 2 years, 253 days
9	Alvan C. Kincaid	Major General; Alvan C. Kincaid	c. 30 September 1950	15 December 1950	c. 76 days
-	Claude E. Duncan	Colonel; Claude E. Duncan; Acting	15 December 1950	29 January 1951	45 days
10	William E. Hall	Major General; William E. Hall	29 January 1951	8 September 1952	1 year, 223 days
11	Alfred A. Kessler	Major General; Alfred A. Kessler	8 September 1952	1 February 1955	2 years, 146 days
-	George G. Northrup	Colonel; George G. Northrup; Acting	1 February 1955	4 February 1955	3 days
12	Robert B. Landry	Major General; Robert B. Landry	4 February 1955	27 June 1957	2 years, 143 days
-	George G. Northrup	Colonel; George G. Northrup; Acting	27 June 1957	30 August 1957	64 days
13	Sory Smith	Major General; Sory Smith	30 August 1957	1 September 1960	3 years, 2 days

=== Fourth Air Force (1966–1969) ===
No.	Commander		Term		
No.	Portrait	Name	Took office	Left office	Term length
14	Carroll W. McColpin	Major General; Carroll W. McColpin	1 April 1966	23 July 1966	113 days
-	John A. Rouse	Brigadier General; John A. Rouse; Acting	23 July 1966	25 August 1966	33 days
14	Carroll W. McColpin	Major General; Carroll W. McColpin	25 August 1966	30 August 1968	2 years, 5 days
15	Robert W. Burns	Major General; Robert W. Burns	30 August 1968	1 August 1969	336 days
-	Eugene L. Strickland	Brigadier General; Eugene L. Strickland; Acting	1 August 1969	30 September 1969	60 days

=== Fourth Air Force (1976–present) ===
No.	Commander		Term		
No.	Portrait	Name	Took office	Left office	Term length
16	Sidney S. Novaresi	Major General; Sidney S. Novaresi	8 October 1976	April 1981	c. 4 years, 189 days
17	Sloan R. Gill	Major General; Sloan R. Gill	April 1981	1 November 1982	c. 1 year, 200 days
18	Robert G. Mortensen	Brigadier General; Robert G. Mortensen	1 November 1982	1 May 1985	2 years, 181 days
19	James C. Wahleithner	Major General; James C. Wahleithner	1 May 1985	4 February 1990	4 years, 279 days
20	James E. Sherrard III	Major General; James E. Sherrard III	4 February 1990	1 July 1993	3 years, 147 days
21	Wallace W. Whaley	Major General; Wallace W. Whaley	1 July 1993	7 August 2000	7 years, 37 days
22	James P. Czekanski	Major General; James P. Czekanski	7 August 2000	7 September 2003	3 years, 31 days
23	Robert E. Duignan	Major General; Robert E. Duignan	7 September 2003	c. January 2009	c. 5 years, 130 days
24	Eric W. Crabtree	Major General; Eric W. Crabtree	c. January 2009	c. March 2011	c. 2 years, 59 days
25	Mark A. Kyle	Major General; Mark A. Kyle	c. March 2011	October 2013	c. 2 years, 230 days
26	John C. Flournoy Jr.	Major General; John C. Flournoy Jr.	3 November 2013	7 February 2017	3 years, 96 days
27	Randall A. Ogden	Major General; Randall A. Ogden	7 February 2017	7 April 2020	3 years, 60 days
28	Jeffrey T. Pennington	Major General; Jeffrey T. Pennington	~7 April 2020	August 2022	~2 years, 116 days
29	Derin S. Durham	Major General; Derin S. Durham	10 September 2022	2 August 2025	2 years, 326 days
30	Paul R. Fast	Major General; Paul R. Fast	2 August 2025	3 August 2026	1 year, 1 day
