= Jeffrey T. Pennington =

American Air Force general

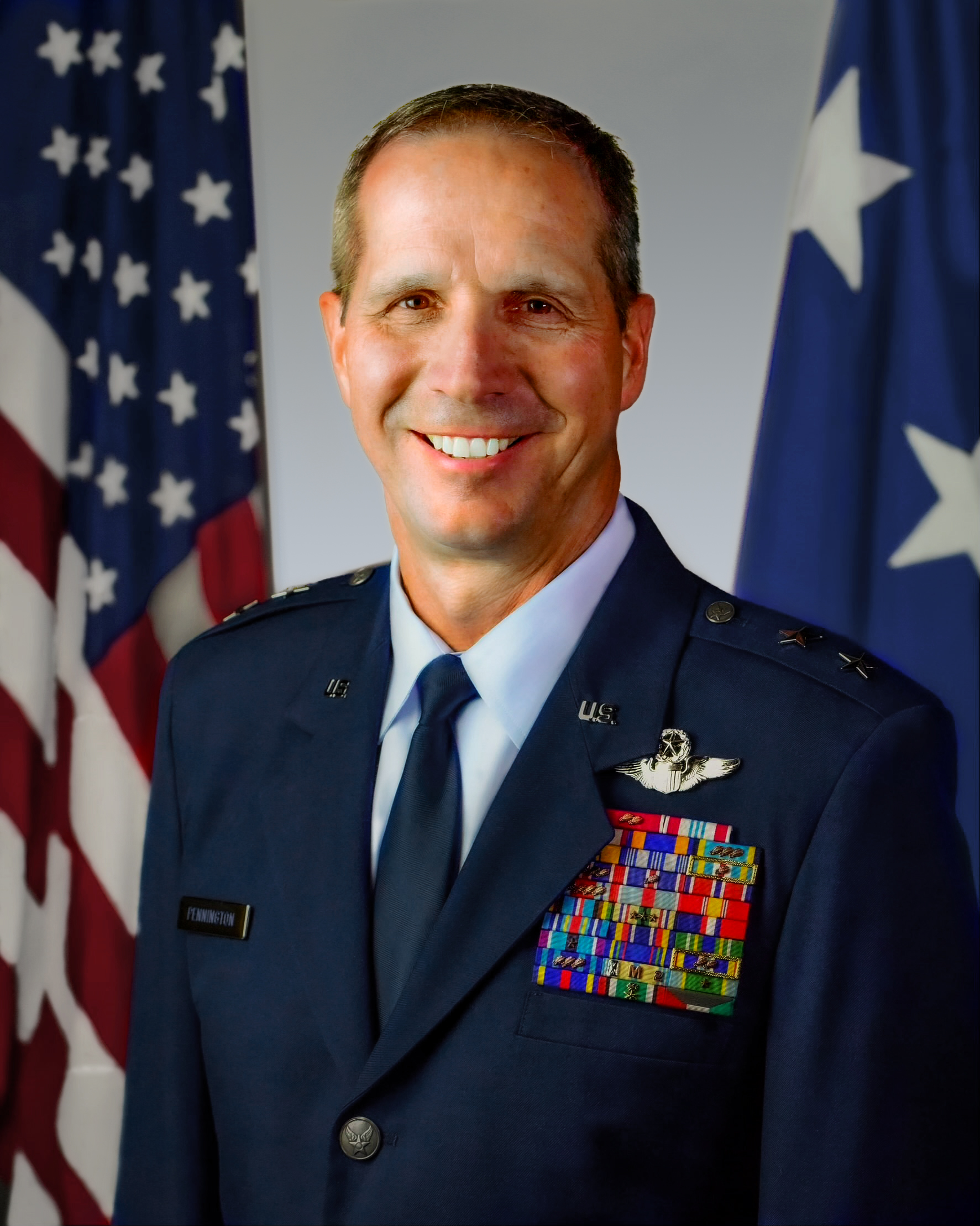
- Military career
- Allegiance: United States
- Branch: United States Air Force
- Service years: 1988–2024
- Rank: Major General
- Commands: Fourth Air Force; 433rd Airlift Wing; 911th Airlift Wing; 452nd Operations Group
- Conflicts: Gulf War
- Awards: Legion of Merit (3)

Jeffrey T. Pennington is a retired major general in the United States Air Force who last served as deputy commander of the Air Force Reserve Command from 2022 to 2024. He commanded the Fourth Air Force from 2020 to 2022.

His retirement ceremony was held on April 26, 2024.

== Dates of promotion ==
Insignia	Rank	Date
	Major general	Apr. 29, 2021
	Brigadier general	July 3, 2018
	Colonel	Sept. 1, 2011
	Lieutenant colonel	Sept. 1, 2007
	Major	Dec. 1, 2003
	Captain	July 28, 1997
	First lieutenant	July 28, 1995
	Second lieutenant	July 28, 1993

Military offices
Preceded by Randall A. Ogden	Commander of the Fourth Air Force; 2020–2022	Succeeded by Derin S. Durham
Preceded by Matthew J. Burger	Deputy Commander of the Air Force Reserve Command; 2022–2024	Succeeded by Frank L. Bradfield III
