= General Burger =

General Burger may refer to:

- Joseph C. Burger (1902–1982), U.S. Marine Corps lieutenant general
- Matthew J. Burger (fl. 1990s–2020s), U.S. Air Force major general
- Schalk Willem Burger (1852–1918), South African Republic general

== See also ==
- General Berger (disambiguation)
