= General Pennington =

General Pennington may refer to:

- Alexander Cummings McWhorter Pennington Jr. (1838–1917), U.S. Army brigadier general
- Jeffrey T. Pennington (fl, 1980s–2020s), U.S. Air Force major general
- Lowther Pennington, 2nd Baron Muncaster (1745–1818), British Army general
