= General Berger =

General Berger may refer to:

- David H. Berger (born 1959), U.S. Marine Corps four-star general
- Gottlob Berger (1896–1975), German Waffen-SS lieutenant general
- Lothar Berger (1900–1971), German Wehrmacht major general

== See also ==
- General Burger (disambiguation)
