= 459th Air Refueling Wing =

USAF Reserve unit based in Maryland

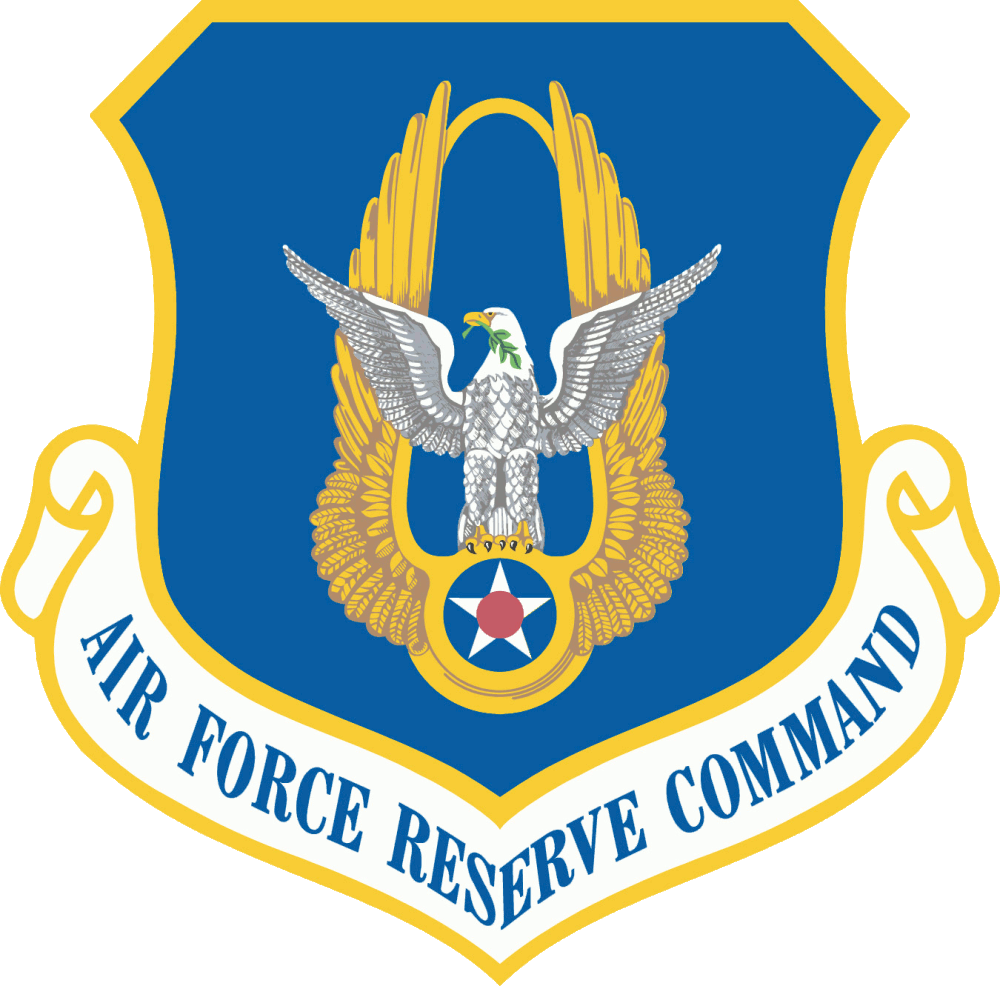
459th Air Refueling Wing

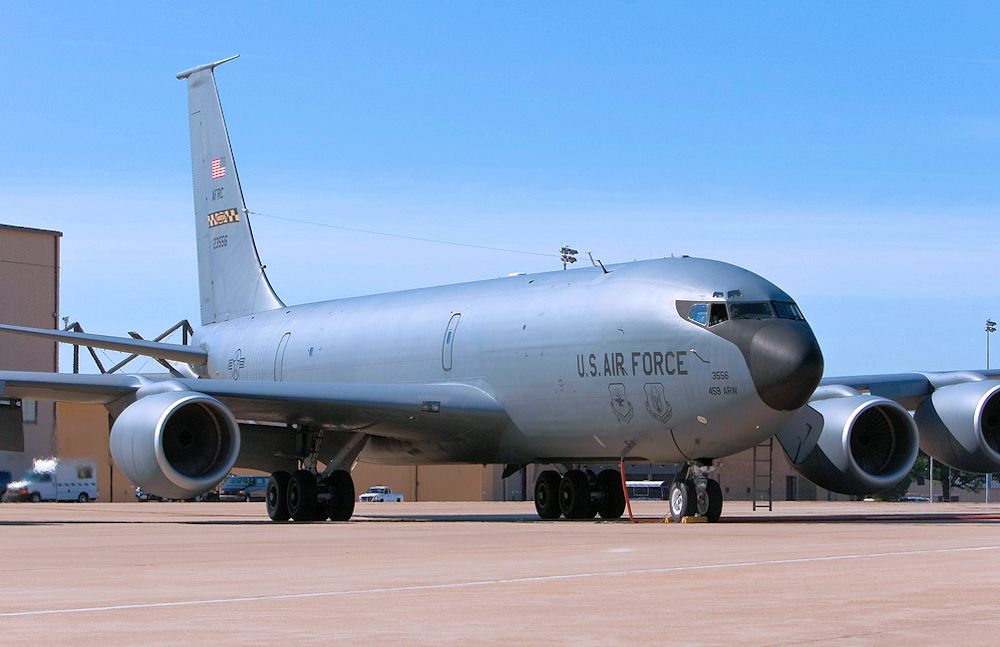
- Wing KC-135 Stratotanker (Note: Aircraft is Boeing KC-135R Stratotanker serial 62-3556.)
- Active: 1955—present
- Country: United States
- Branch: United States Air Force
- Role: Aerial refueling
- Size: More than 1300 personnel
- Part of: Air Force Reserve Command
- Garrison/HQ: Joint Base Andrews, Maryland
- Nickname: The Congressional Wing
- Motto: In Honor of Congress (1958–1996)
- Decorations: Air Force Outstanding Unit Award; Republic of Vietnam Gallantry Cross with Palm

Commanders
- Current commander: Colonel Kevin R. Snow

Insignia
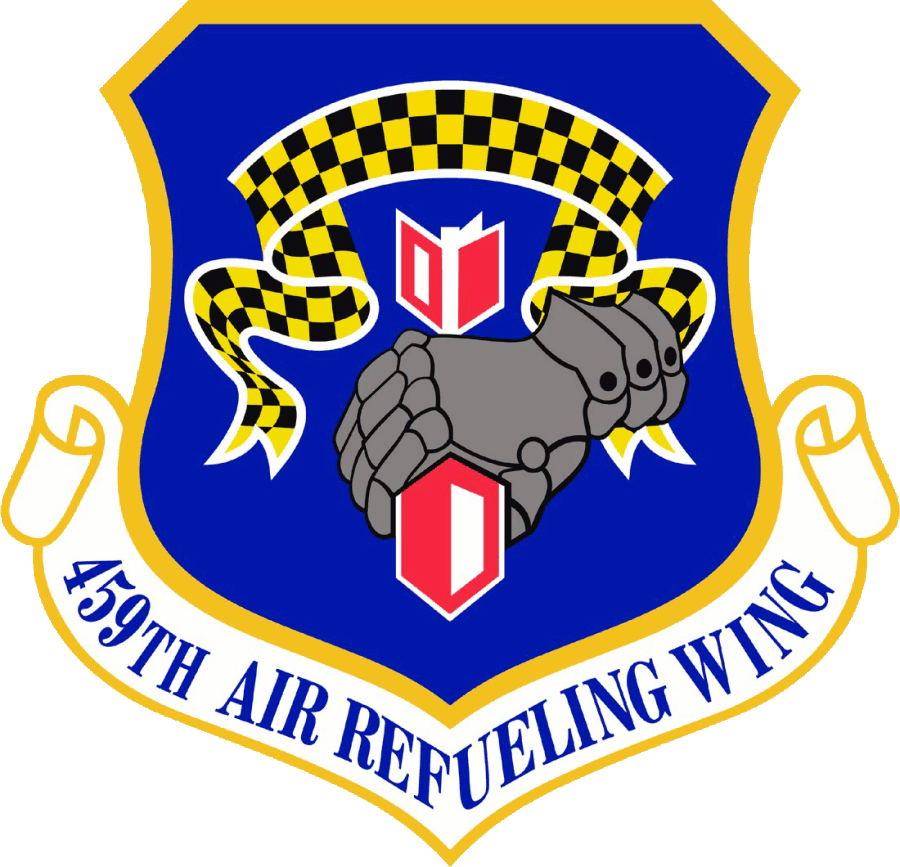
- 459th Air Refueling Wing emblem (Note: Approved 24 June 1996.)

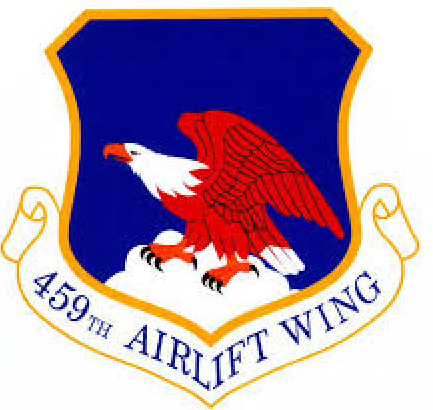
- 459th Airlift Wing emblem

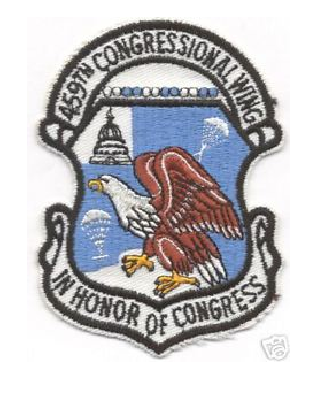
- Patch with 459th Troop Carrier Wing emblem (Note: Approved 17 January 1958.)
- Tail Stripe: Black/Yellow check "Andrews" in yellow

Aircraft flown
- Tanker: Boeing KC-135 Stratotanker

The 459th Air Refueling Wing is a wing of the Air Force Reserve Command of the United States Air Force. It is assigned to the Fourth Air Force and stationed at Joint Base Andrews, Maryland. If mobilized, the wing would be gained by the Air Mobility Command. The wing flies and maintains Boeing KC-135 Stratotankers, providing air refueling.

The wing, over the years, is a six-time recipient of the Air Force Outstanding Unit Award. There are about 1,200 traditional reservists stationed at the wing. A full-time civilian and Air Reserve Technician staff of approximately 230 personnel provide wing day-to-day administration and management.

== Units ==
The 459th Air Refueling Wing consists of the following major units:

- 459th Operations Group

756th Air Refueling Squadron
459th Aeromedical Evacuation Squadron

- 459th Maintenance Group

459th Maintenance Operations Flight
459th Aircraft Maintenance Squadron
459th Maintenance Squadron

- 459th Mission Support Group

69th Aerial Port Squadron
459th Force Support Squadron
459th Logistics Readiness Squadron
459th Security Forces Squadron
759th Logistics Readiness Flight*459th Medical Group
459th Aerospace Medicine Squadron
459th Aeromedical Staging Squadron

== History ==
(Note: The 459th Air Refueling Wing is entitled to display the honors of the group by temporary bestowal.)

=== Activation in the Air Force Reserve ===
The reserve flying mission began at Andrews Air Force Base in the summer of 1954, when the 756th Troop Carrier Squadron was activated and equipped with Curtiss C-46 Commando aircraft and began training under the supervision of the 2259th Air Force Reserve Combat Training Center. Nearly 8 months later, the unit had grown enough to activate its parent, the 459th Troop Carrier Wing.

In the summer of 1956, the wing participated in Operation Sixteen Ton during its two weeks of active duty training. Sixteen Ton was performed entirely by reserve troop carrier units and moved United States Coast Guard equipment From Floyd Bennett Naval Air Station to Isla Grande Airport in Puerto Rico and San Salvador in the Bahamas. After the success of this operation, the wing began to use inactive duty training periods for Operation Swift Lift, transporting high priority cargo for the Air Force and Operation Ready Swap, transporting aircraft engines between Air Materiel Command's depots.

In 1958, the 2259th Center was inactivated and some of its personnel were absorbed by the wing. In place of active duty support (Note: Air reserve centers training reserve units were regular air force units.) for reserve units, ConAC adopted the Air Reserve Technician program, in which a cadre of the unit consisted of full-time personnel who were simultaneously civilian employees of the Air Force and also held military rank as members of the reserves.

=== Detached Squadron Concept ===
During the first half of 1955, the Air Force began detaching Air Force Reserve squadrons from their parent wing locations to separate sites. Communities were more likely to accept the smaller squadrons than the large wings and the location of separate squadrons in smaller population centers would facilitate recruiting and manning. The wing's 757th Troop Carrier Squadron, which was activated in April 1955 was located at Byrd Field, Virginia, rather than at Andrews. was one of the first three squadrons activated under this program. When the wing activated its third flying squadron, the 758th Troop Carrier Squadron, in 1957, it was located at Greater Pittsburgh Airport, Pennsylvania. In November 1957, the 757th relocated from Byrd Field, which also hosted an Air National Guard group, to Youngstown Municipal Airport, Ohio.

In April 1959, the wing reorganized under the Dual Deputy system. Its 459th Troop Carrier Group was inactivated and the 756th, 757th and 758th Troop Carrier Squadrons were assigned directly to the wing.

=== Activation of groups under the wing ===
Although the dispersal of flying units was not a problem when the entire wing was called to active service, mobilizing a single flying squadron and elements to support it proved difficult. This weakness was demonstrated in the partial mobilization of reserve units during the Berlin Crisis of 1961 To resolve this, at the start of 1962, ConAC determined to reorganize its reserve wings by establishing groups with support elements for each of its troop carrier squadrons. This reorganization would facilitate mobilization of elements of wings in various combinations when needed. However, as this plan was entering its implementation phase, another partial mobilization occurred for the Cuban Missile Crisis. The formation of troop carrier groups was delayed until January for wings that had not been mobilized. The 909th Troop Carrier Group at Andrews, the 910th Troop Carrier Group at Youngstown, and the 911th Troop Carrier Group at Pittsburgh were all assigned to the wing on 17 January.

=== Airlift Operations ===
459th AMW C-141B Starlifter at Miami International Airport, 1995.

On 1 July 1966, the 459th was redesignated the 459th Military Airlift Wing and converted to a strategic, long-range mission with the Douglas C-124 Globemaster II aircraft.

In June 1971, the 459th converted to the Lockheed C-130 Hercules and was redesignated as the 459th Tactical Airlift Wing. In December 1974, with the consolidation of all Air Force strategic and tactical airlift resources under a single manager, the 459th's active duty gaining command switched from Tactical Air Command to Military Airlift Command.

In July 1986, the wing converted to the Lockheed C-141B Starlifter aircraft and became the first Air Force Reserve unit to be equipped with own C-141s. The conversion resulted in an increase of wing personnel at Andrews from 900 to a level of almost 1,600.

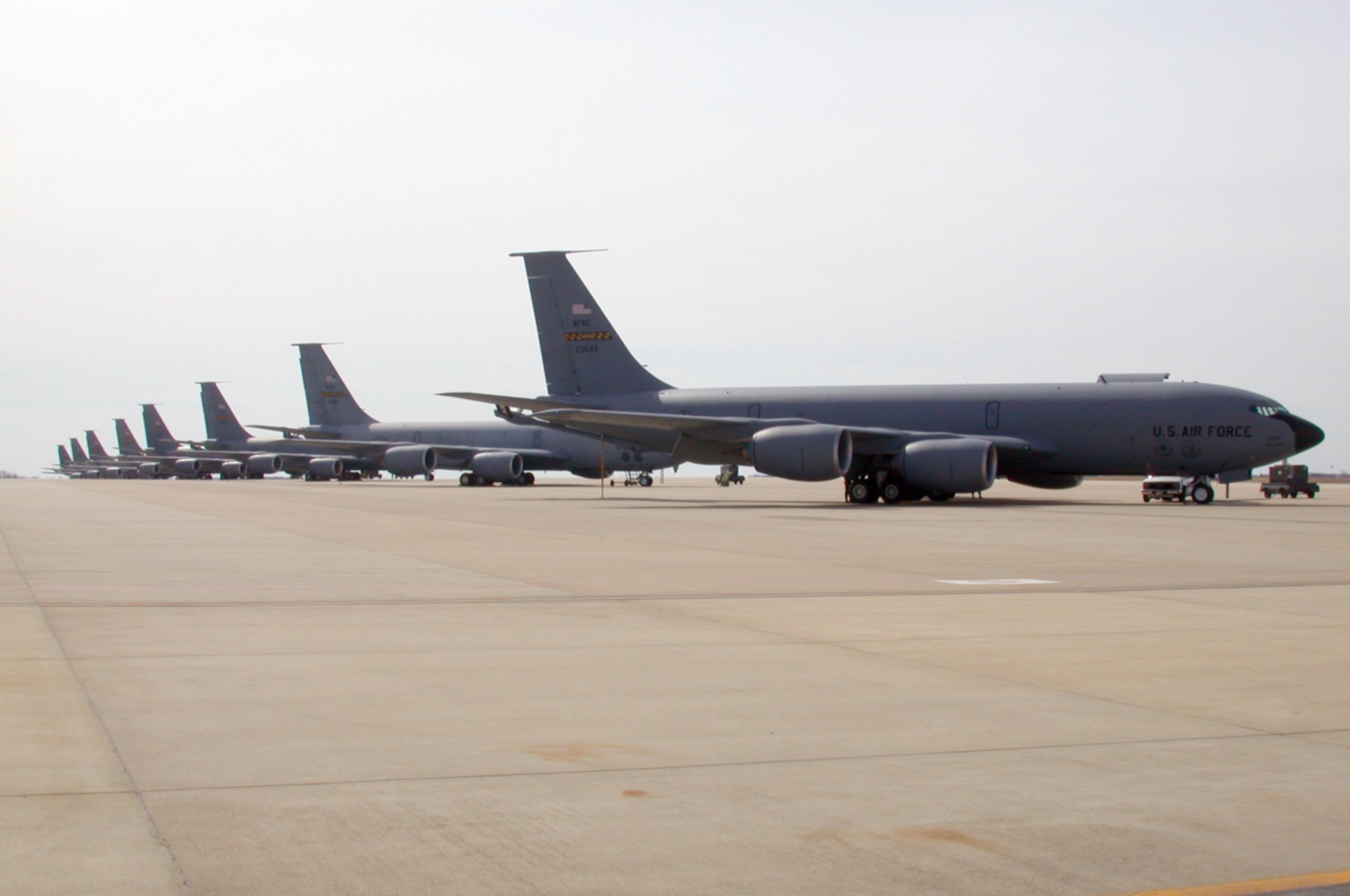
459th ARW KC-135Rs at Andrews AFB in 2004.

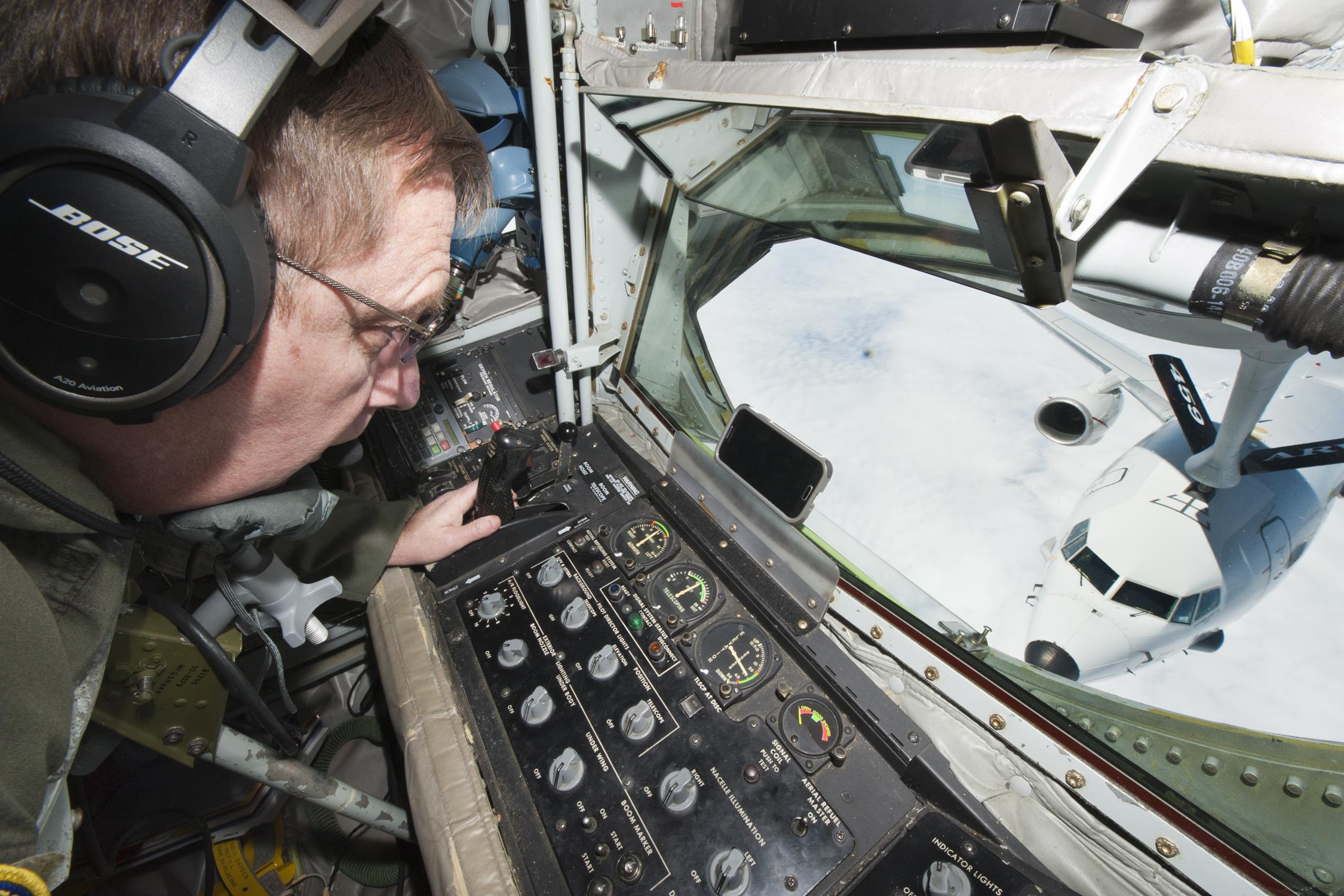
USN P-8 being refueled by 459th ARW KC-135R

In 1989, a 459th C-141 was the first aircraft to fly troops and supplies into Howard Air Force Base, Panama during Operation Just Cause; the following year the wing was named the Air Force Reserve Outstanding Unit of the Year by the Air Force Association. In August 1990 wing aircrews were some of the first reservists activated in Support of Operation Desert Shield and many additional members were called to active service at the start of Operation Desert Storm with many deployed through the summer of 1991.

=== Post Cold War era ===
In 1993, the 459th continued to support Operation Restore Hope and mobilized members in support of the operations in Somalia. The wing provided humanitarian airlift relief in Rwanda and in support of the Cuban refugees at Naval Base Guantanamo Bay, Cuba. In addition, 459th personnel supported Operation Uphold Democracy in Haiti as well as various other significant missions around the globe.

The 459th has been engaged in the global war on terrorism since September 2001. As a result of these operations, the Wing has participated in places around the globe to include: Iraq, Afghanistan, Qatar, Cuba, Bosnia, Kosovo, Turkey and Guam. Re-designated in 2003 as an air refueling wing, the 459th is equipped with KC-135Rs.

In 2017, the 459th worked with the Naval Air Systems Command to certify operationally the Navy's Boeing P-8 Poseidon Anti-Submarine Warfare aircraft for aerial refueling. Also in 2017, a 459th Air Refueling Wing commemorative challenge coin was created to be "Presented by the Unit Commander" and consists of the 459th emblem. The front says" AIR FORCE RESERVE COMMAND, JOINT BASE ANDREWS On the back of the antique brass challenge coin is the rarely seen 459th AMDS "yellow lion" with yellow and red crosses on its blue background. The words included are: HEALTH - VALOR - PRIDE, INTEGRITY • EXCELLENCE • SERVICE

== Lineage ==
- Established as the 459th Troop Carrier Wing, Medium on 30 December 1954

Activated in the Reserve on 26 January 1955
Redesignated 459th Military Airlift Wing on 1 July 1966
Redesignated 459th Tactical Airlift Wing on 29 June 1971
Redesignated 459th Military Airlift Wing on 1 July 1986
Redesignated 459th Airlift Wing on 1 February 1992
Redesignated 459th Air Refueling Wing on 1 October 2003

=== Assignments ===
- First Air Force, 26 January 1955
- Fourteenth Air Force, 25 March 1958
- Second Air Force Reserve Region, 15 August 1960
- First Air Force Reserve Region, 24 June 1966
- Eastern Air Force Reserve Region, 31 December 1969
- Fourteenth Air Force, 8 October 1976
- Twenty-Second Air Force, 1 July 1993
- Fourth Air Force, 1 April 2003 – present

=== Components ===
Groups

- 459th Troop Carrier Group (later, 459th Operations Group): 26 January 1955 – 14 April 1959; 1 August 1992 – present
- 904th Troop Carrier Group (later 904th Military Airlift Group): 1 July 1966 – 26 January 1968; 2 June – 31 December 1969
- 905th Military Airlift Group (later 905th Tactical Airlift Group): 25 February 1972 – 1 April 1974.
- 907th Tactical Airlift Group (later 907th Airlift Group): 1 October 1989 – 1 October 1994
- 909th Troop Carrier Group (later 909th Military Airlift Group): 17 January 1963 – 1 September 1975
- 910th Troop Carrier Group (later 910th Tactical Fighter Group, 910th Tactical Airlift Group): 17 January 1963 – 1 July 1966; 1 April 1981 – 1 October 1989.
- 911th Troop Carrier Group (later 911th Military Airlift Group): 17 January 1963 – 21 April 1971 (detached 1 – 21 April 1971)
- 913th Tactical Airlift Group (later 913th Airlift Group): 8 January 1976 – 1 August 1992.
- 915th Military Airlift Group: 26 January 1968 – 1 September 1969.
- 918th Military Airlift Group: attached 1–20 April 1971, assigned 21 April 1971 – 1 July 1972
- 919th Military Airlift Group (later 919th Tactical Airlift Group): 30 July 1971 – 1 December 1974
- 920th Tactical Airlift Group: 25 April 1973 – 1 January 1976
- 927th Tactical Airlift Group: 15 March 1976 – 1 July 1981

Squadrons

- 756th Troop Carrier Squadron (later 756th Military Airlift Squadron, 756th Airlift Squadron): 14 April 1959 – 17 January 1963, 1 September 1975 – 1 August 1992
- 757th Troop Carrier Squadron: 8 April 1955 – 17 January 1963
- 758th Troop Carrier Squadron: 14 April 1959 – 17 January 1963

=== Stations ===
- Andrews Air Force Base (later Joint Base Andrews), Maryland, 26 January 1955 – present

=== Aircraft ===
- Curtiss C-46 Commando, 1955–1957
- Fairchild C-119 Flying Boxcar, 1957–1967
- Douglas C-124 Globemaster II, 1966–1972
- Lockheed RC-130 Hercules, 1971–1973
- Lockheed C-130 Hercules, 1971–1986
- de Havilland Canada C-7 Caribou, 1972
- Lockheed C-141 Starlifter, 1986–2003
- Boeing KC-135 Stratotanker, 2003 – present
