= Jacob Earl Fickel =

United States Army Air Forces general

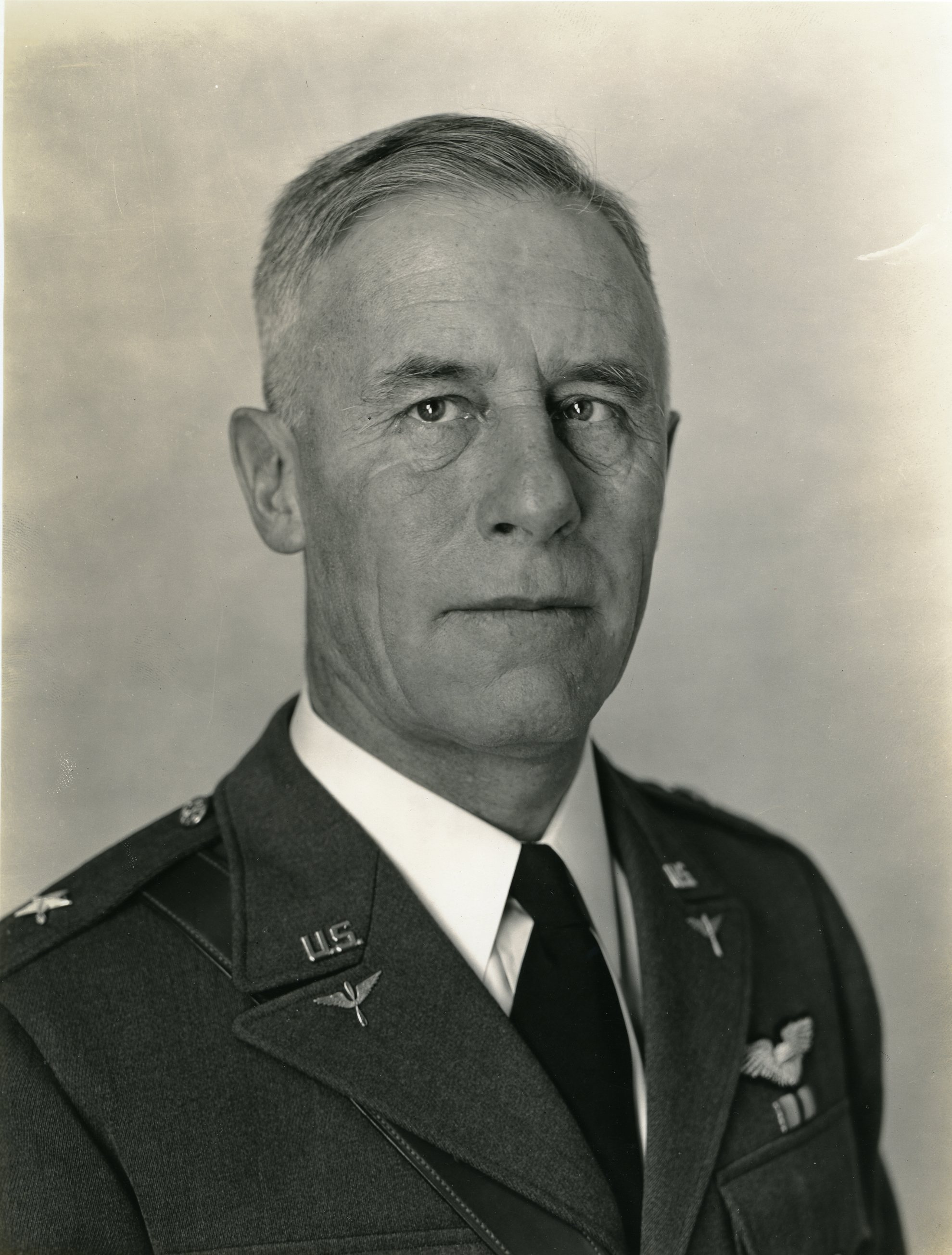
- Major General Jacob Earl Fickel during World War II
- Born: January 31, 1883; Des Moines, Iowa, United States
- Died: August 7, 1956 (aged 73); Wiesbaden, Germany
- Military career
- Allegiance: United States
- Branch: United States Army
- Service years: 1904–1946
- Rank: Major General
- Nickname: Jake
- Commands: District No. 3 (Western) Technical Training Command; Fourth Air Force; 1st Wing, GHQ Air Force; Air Corps Advanced Flying School
- Conflicts: World War II
- Awards: Army Distinguished Service Medal

Jacob Earl "Jake" Fickel (January 31, 1883 – August 7, 1956) was a general officer and an instructor of aviation in the United States Army. He served as a private, corporal and sergeant, prior to being commissioned an officer and rising to the rank of major general.

== Military career ==
Fickel was born in Des Moines, Iowa, on January 31, 1883. He enlisted in the Regular Army when he was 21 years old. He served as a private, corporal, sergeant, and first sergeant of Company K, 27th Infantry of the United States Army. He was stationed at Fort Hayes, Fort Sheridan, and Fort Leavenworth. In 1907, Fickel was commissioned as a second lieutenant of Infantry. He then joined the 29th Infantry at Fort Douglas. In August of that year, the regiment went to the Philippine Islands, where Fickel served at Fort William McKinley with Second Lieutenant Henry H. Arnold. In 1909, he returned to the United States and was stationed at Fort Jay on Governors Island in New York Harbor. He was there through 1911. He then went to Fort Niagara until November 1913.

Fickel returned to the Philippine Islands for a second tour with the 13th Infantry. He served at Fort William McKinley again, and at Camp McGrath, until March 1917. He was then assigned to duty as an instructor at the Officers Training Camp at Fort Benjamin Harrison, where he remained until November of that year. Fickel was then ordered to Washington, D.C., for duty with the headquarters of the Aviation Section of the Signal Corps. He served there until May 1918.

Fickel was next ordered to Rockwell Field in California as a student officer at the flying school. Upon completion of his course in November 1918, he assumed command of Carruthers Field in Texas, where he remained until January 1919. Fickel was then ordered back to Washington, where he served in the Office of the Chief of Air Service until March 1921. His next duty was with the Spruce Production Corporation of Portland, Oregon, until the summer of 1922. He then returned to Washington for a two-year tour of duty as Chief of the Supply Division of the Air Service.

In June 1925, Fickel graduated from the Air Corps Technical School at Langley Field. In June 1926, he graduated with honors from the Command and General Staff School at Fort Leavenworth. His next served as executive officer of the Materiel Division at McCook Field until 1930, with the exception of a three-month period in 1927, during which he attended the Air Corps Advanced Flying School at Kelly Field in Texas.

Fickel then attended the Army War College in Washington, D.C. He graduated in June 1931. His next duty was as Chief of the Buildings and Grounds Division in the Office of the Chief of Air Corps, also in Washington. He was there until January 1935. From February 1935 to June 1936, Fickel was Commandant of the Air Corps Advanced Flying School at Kelly Field. His was next Air Officer of the Ninth Corps Area, with headquarters at the Presidio of San Francisco, California, until March 1939, when he was assigned to command the 1st Wing, General Headquarters Air Force at March Field in California. In February 1940, he was appointed Assistant Chief of Air Corps in Washington, D.C. Fickel was assigned to Riverside, California, in 1940, as Air District Commander, becoming the first Commanding General of the Fourth Air Force on December 18, 1940. He was reassigned to command the District No. 3 (Western) Technical Training Command, Oklahoma, on March 5, 1942. He retired in 1946 in San Antonio, Texas. Fickel died of a heart attack while visiting his son in Wiesbaden, Germany, on August 7, 1956.

== Aerial gunnery pioneer ==
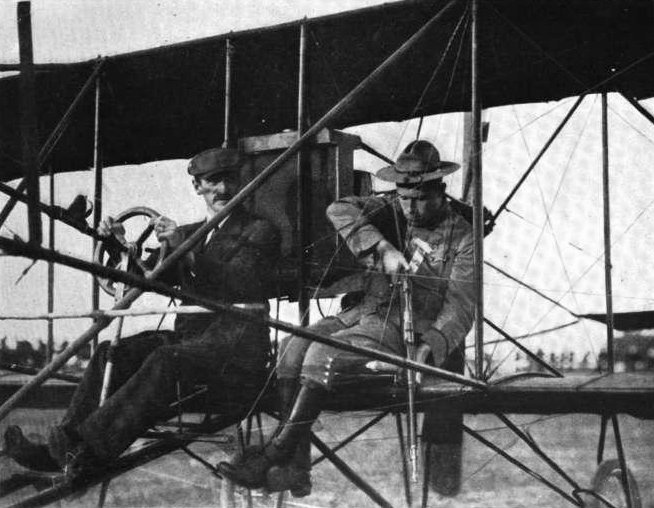
Lieutenant Jacob Earl Fickel with Glenn H. Curtiss experimentally shooting from an airplane in 1910

Fickel became the first aerial gunner in America. These experiments led to low-recoil machine guns. Soon thereafter, machine guns were added to planes for air-to-ground attack and air-to-air fighting. The first airplane machine guns were patented by Samuel Neal McClean|de. McClean sold his rights to the Automatic Arms Company in late 1910. Isaac Newton Lewis, working for the company, later improved the technology on this airplane machine gun system. The first use of an airplane machine gun in combat was in August 1914, with the first recorded airplane shot down in air-to-air fighting in October of that year. By 1915, air combat was an integral part of fighting in World War I.

== Sources ==
- Grant, Neil (2014). The Lewis Gun. Bloomsbury Publishing. ISBN 9781782007920.
