= Carroll W. McColpin =

United States Air Force general

Carroll Warren McColpin
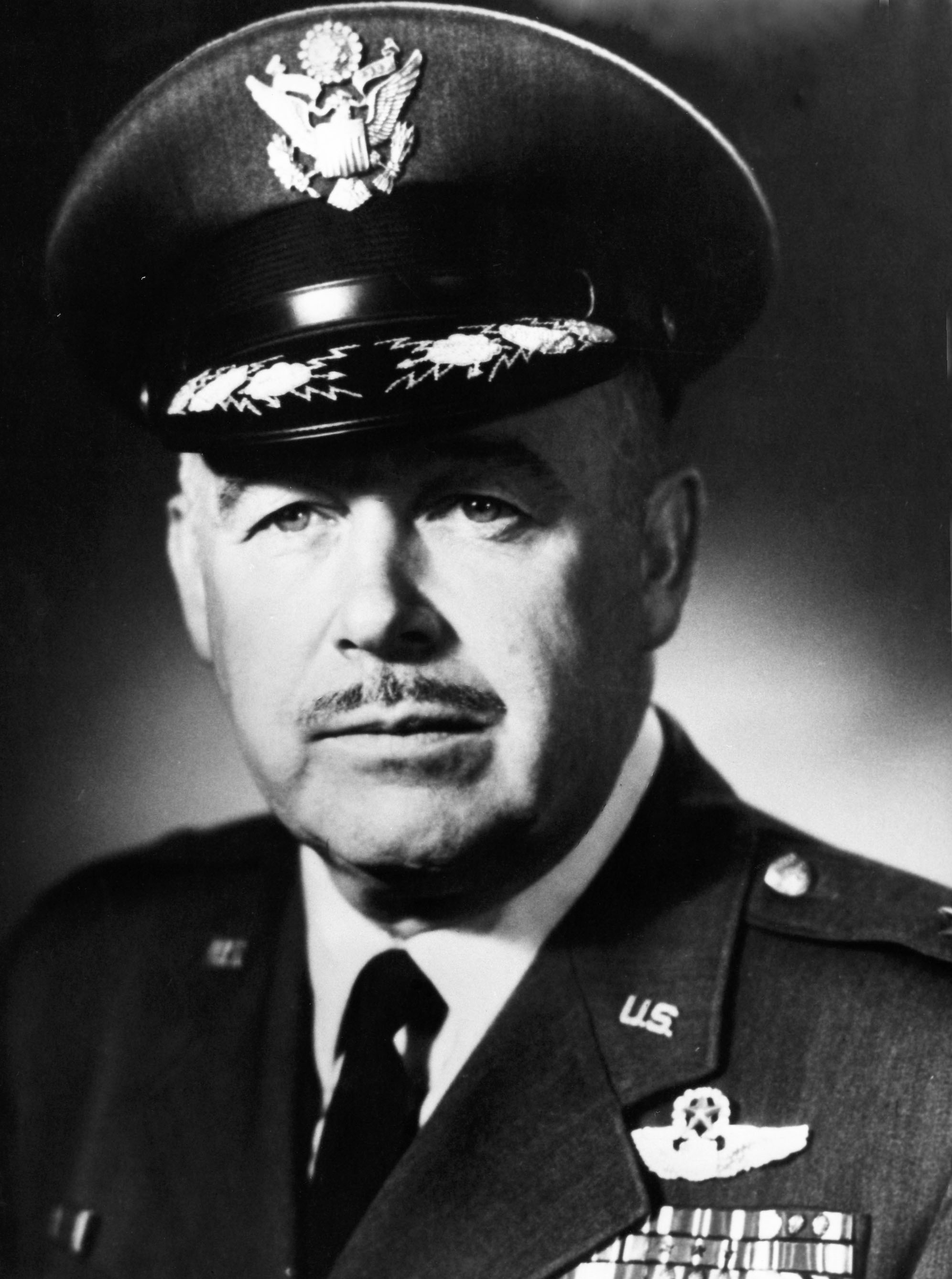
- Born: November 15, 1914; Buffalo, New York
- Died: November 28, 2003 (aged 89); Los Angeles, California
- Burial place: Arlington National Cemetery
- Military career
- Allegiance: United Kingdom; United States
- Branch: Royal Air Force; United States Army Air Forces; United States Air Force
- Service years: 1940–1968
- Rank: Major General
- Commands: Fourth Air Force; Portland Air Defense Sector; San Francisco Air Defense Sector; 64th Air Division; 31st Fighter Group; 365th Fighter Group; 404th Fighter Bomber Group; 407th Fighter Bomber Group; 336th Fighter Squadron
- Conflicts: World War II
- Awards: Air Force Distinguished Service Medal; Legion of Merit (3); Distinguished Flying Cross; Air Medal (7); Distinguished Flying Cross (United Kingdom); Croix de Guerre (France); Croix de Guerre (Belgium)

Major General Carroll W. McColpin (November 15, 1914 – November 28, 2003) was a United States Air Force officer who served during World War II and the Cold War. Prior to the United States entry into World War II, in November 1940, he volunteered for duty with the Royal Air Force (RAF) in November 1940 and was commissioned a pilot officer in the RAF before transferring to the United States Army Air Forces in the grade of major in September 1942.

His decorations include the Air Force Distinguished Service Medal, Legion of Merit with two oak leaf clusters, Air Medal with six oak leaf clusters and the British Distinguished Flying Cross. McColpin was credited with 12 kills, 5 probable, and 12 damaged while with the Eagle Squadrons. In both services he could have claimed a minimum of ten more Luftwaffe aircraft of mixed types destroyed on the ground by attacking German airfields in France and Germany. McColpin scored another 8 confirmed kills while in the Army Air Force.

== Early years ==
Carroll Warren McColpin was born in Buffalo, New York on November 15, 1914, and was raised and educated in Los Angeles, California. He participated in civilian flying activities in Los Angeles, and in 1936 obtained his pilot's certificate. As a young man, he had built his own airplane and taught himself the basics of stick flying and aerial acrobatics by the age of sixteen.

== RAF service ==
Despite official United States government disapproval, McColpin travelled via Canada to England where he joined the Royal Air Force (RAF) in November 1940.

After serving initially with the RAF's No. 607 Squadron in May 1941, McColpin joined the second Eagle Squadron, No. 121 Squadron, as a pilot and then went to No. 71 Squadron, the 1st Eagle Squadron. In November 1941 he was awarded the Distinguished Flying Cross. The award was made personally by King George VI. In January 1942 he was posted as a flight commander in No. 133 Squadron. McColpin went back to the United States in June 1942 to participate for 10 weeks in a war bond tour, followed by four weeks home leave. On his return, being an American, a flying ace and having served in combat with all three Eagle Squadrons, McColpin was appointed to command 133 Squadron.

McColpin was the only American to fly combat in all three RAF American Eagle Squadrons. He flew a total of over 300 missions in these squadrons, counting the ones he flew with No. 607 Squadron. He was a double ace before Pearl Harbor and was the first American to be decorated, at Buckingham Palace, by King George VI during World War II.

== USAAF service ==
On the United States entry into the war, and the arrival of the United States' Eighth Air Force in Britain, the US Eagle Squadron personnel and equipment transferred to the United States Army Air Forces in September 1942 and McColpin was appointed to the rank of major and the command of the 336th Fighter Squadron, 4th Fighter Group. Returning to the United States in 1943, he was assigned duty as assistant deputy for operations, III Fighter Command, Drew Field, Florida, and he subsequently assumed command of the 407th Fighter Bomber Group at Lakeland Army Air Field, Florida in September of that year.

In January 1944, McColpin was appointed commander of the 404th Fighter Bomber Group at Myrtle Beach Army Air Field, South Carolina, and moved that unit overseas to England where he remained in command through the English, French and Belgian campaigns.

In December 1944, McColpin transferred to the XXIX Tactical Air Command as director of combat operations. He returned to the United States in March 1945 and served as deputy and later as commander of the III Fighter Command Gunnery School at Pinellas Army Air Field, Florida until February 1946, when he proceeded to Germany to command the 365th Fighter Group at AAF Station Schweinfurt.

== USAF career ==
McColpin returned to the United States from Germany in October 1947, to command the 31st Fighter Group at Turner AFB, Albany, Georgia, until February 1950, when he enrolled in the Armed Forces Staff College. Upon his graduation in July 1950, McColpin was assigned to the Continental Air Command at Mitchel AFB, New York, and later to the Air Defense Command, at Ent AFB, Colorado Springs, Colorado, as director of operations and training. In June 1952, he was transferred to Eastern Air Defense Force Headquarters at Stewart AFB, New York as the deputy for operations, where he remained until enrolling in the Air War College in July 1954.

After graduation from the Air War College in June 1955, McColpin assumed command of the 64th Air Division (Defense) at Pepperrell Air Force Base, St. Johns Newfoundland, Canada. He was transferred to Headquarters North American Air Defense Command, Colorado Springs, Colorado, on August 1, 1958, as director of operations and served in that capacity until July 1962.

McColpin commanded the San Francisco Air Defense Sector at Beale AFB, California, from August 1962 to June 1963, before his assignment as commander, Portland Air Defense Sector, Adair Air Force Station, Oregon. In October 1964, McColpin was named vice commander, 28th Air Division (SAGE), headquartered at Hamilton Air Force Base, California. He later became commander, Fourth Air Force at Hamilton on 1 April 1966. He retired on September 1, 1968.

== Awards and decorations ==
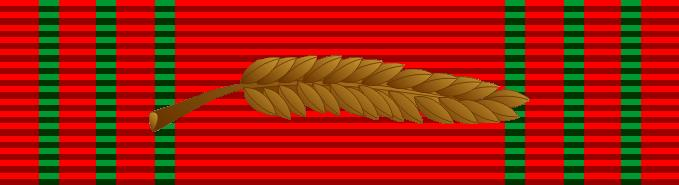
USAF Command pilot badge
Air Force Distinguished Service Medal
Legion of Merit with two bronze oak leaf clusters
Distinguished Flying Cross
Air Medal with silver and bronze oak leaf clusters
Air Force Presidential Unit Citation
American Campaign Medal
European-African-Middle Eastern Campaign Medal with silver and bronze campaign stars
World War II Victory Medal
Army of Occupation Medal with 'Germany' clasp
National Defense Service Medal with service star
Air Force Longevity Service Award with silver oak leaf cluster
Small Arms Expert Marksmanship Ribbon
Distinguished Flying Cross (United Kingdom)
Croix de Guerre with Palm (France)
Croix de Guerre with Palm (Belgium)
Defence Medal (United Kingdom)
Air Crew Europe Star (United Kingdom)
1939–1945 Star (United Kingdom)
France and Germany Star (United Kingdom)
War Medal 1939–1945 (United Kingdom)
