= Matthew J. Burger =

Air Force Reserve Command deputy commander

Major General Matthew J. Burger
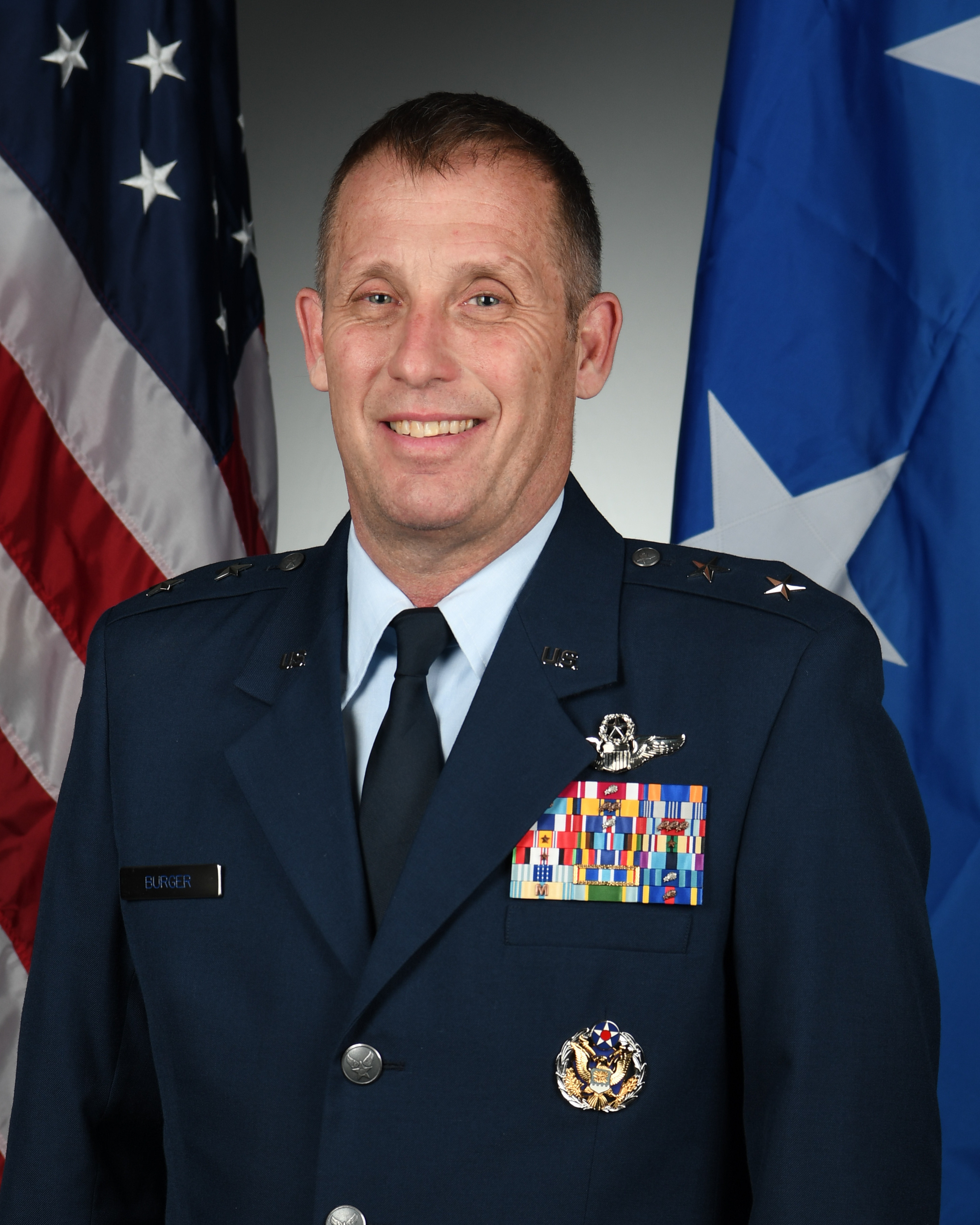
- Military career
- Allegiance: United States
- Branch: United States Air Force
- Service years: 1990–2025
- Rank: Major General
- Commands: Force Generation Center; 452nd Air Mobility Wing; 349th Air Mobility Wing; 349th Operations Group; 459th Operations Group
- Awards: Legion of Merit (2); Meritorious Service Medal (4); Air Medal

Matthew J. Burger is a United States Air Force major general who has served as mobilization assistant to the chief of Air Force Reserve since August 2023. He most recently served as deputy to the chief of Air Force Reserve since August 2022 to August 2023. He previously served as the deputy commander of the Air Force Reserve Command from 2020 to 2022.

Military offices
Preceded by John C. Flournoy Jr.	Deputy Commander of the Air Force Reserve Command; 2020–2022	Succeeded by Jeffrey T. Pennington
Preceded by John P. Healy	Deputy to the Chief of Air Force Reserve; 2022–2023	Succeeded by C. McCauley Van Hoffman
Preceded by ???	Mobilization Assistant to the Chief of Air Force Reserve; 2023–present	Incumbent
