= Randall A. Ogden =

American Air Force general

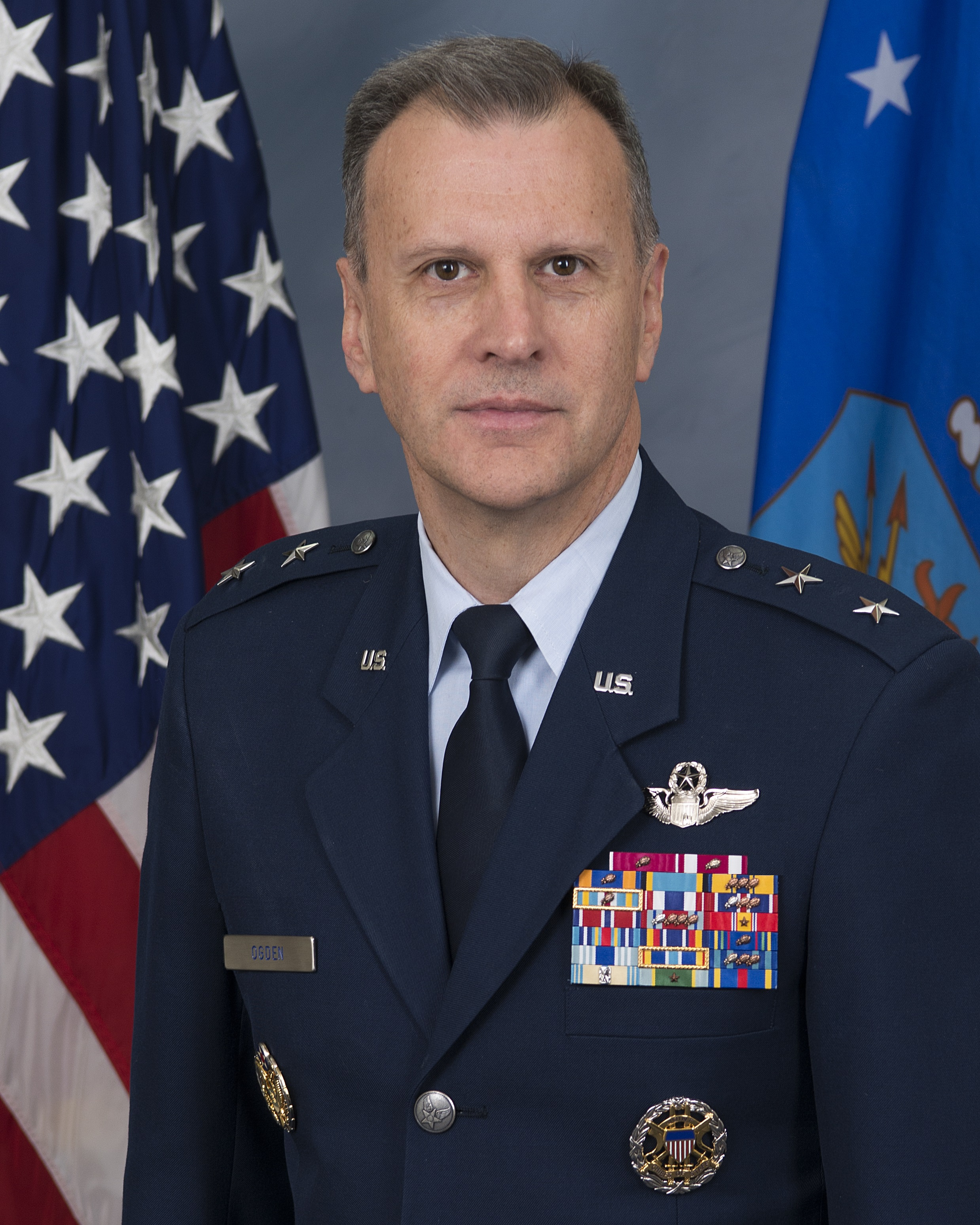
- Military career
- Allegiance: United States
- Branch: United States Air Force
- Service years: 1983–2020
- Rank: Major General
- Commands: Fourth Air Force; 916th Air Refueling Wing; 376th Operations Group
- Conflicts: War in Afghanistan
- Awards: Defense Superior Service Medal; Legion of Merit (2)

Randall A. Ogden is a retired major general in the United States Air Force. He commanded the Fourth Air Force from March 2017 to April 2020.

== Dates of promotion ==
Insignia	Rank	Date
	Major general	Dec. 7, 2016
	Brigadier general	Jan. 3, 2014
	Colonel	Aug. 21, 2007
	Lieutenant colonel	Sept. 4, 2003
	Major	Oct. 1, 1997
	Captain	Nov. 18, 1987
	First lieutenant	Nov. 18, 1985
	Second lieutenant	Nov. 18, 1983
