= 911th Airlift Wing =

911th Airlift Wing

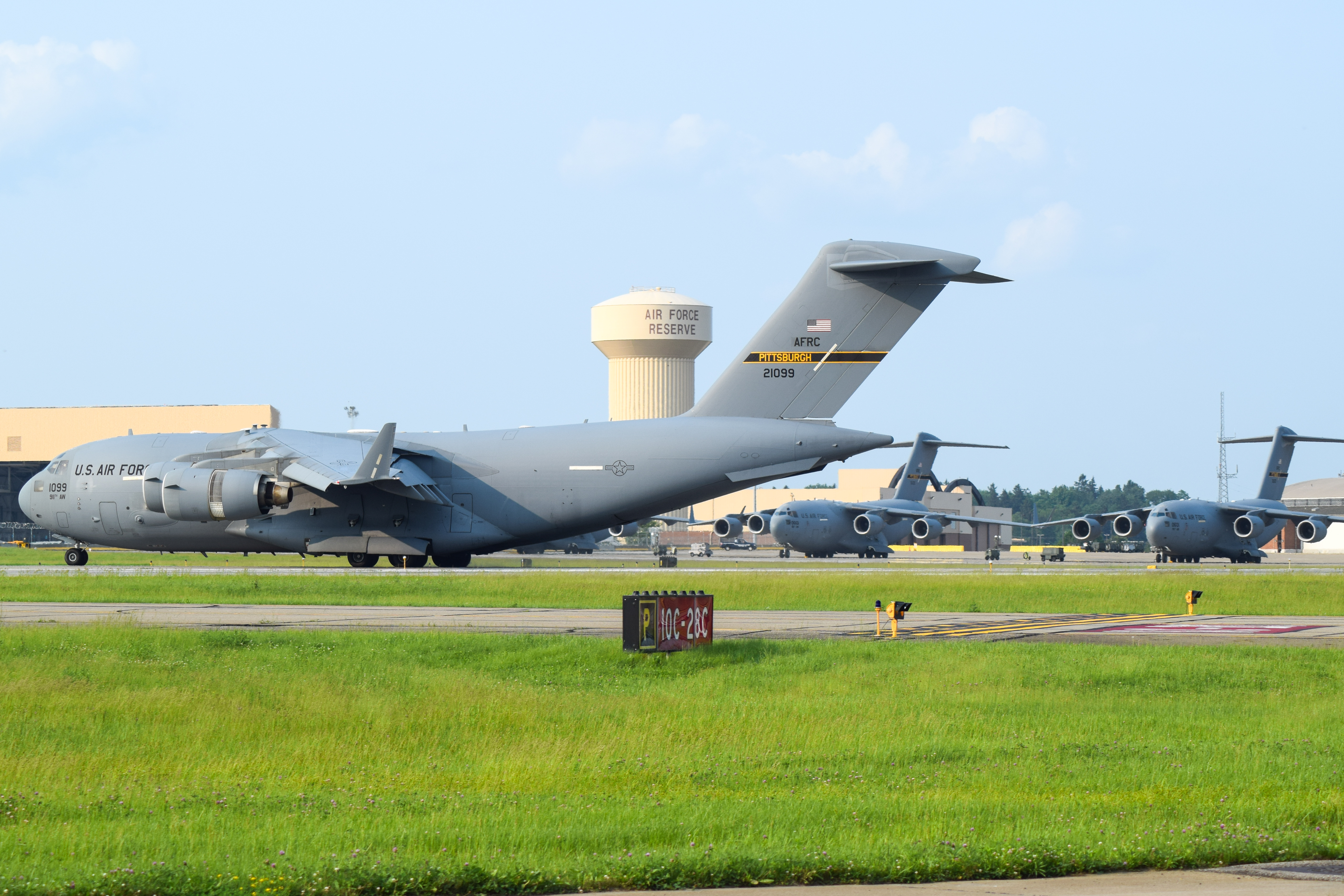
- Boeing C-17A Globemaster III 02-1099 slowing down on the runway
- Active: 1963—present
- Country: United States
- Branch: United States Air Force
- Role: Airlift
- Size: 1,200 Personnel
- Part of: Air Force Reserve Command
- Garrison/HQ: Pittsburgh International Airport Air Reserve Station
- Decorations: Air Force Outstanding Unit Award; Republic of Vietnam Gallantry Cross with Palm

Commanders
- Current commander: Colonel Douglas A. Stouffer

Insignia
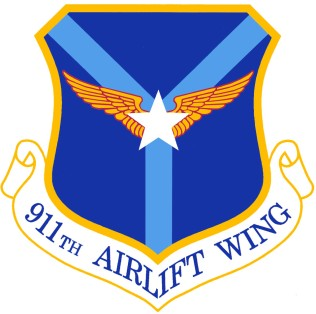
- 911th Airlift Wing emblem (approved 22 March 1995)

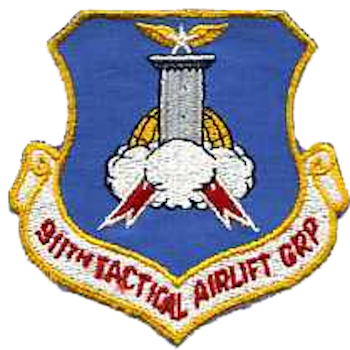
- 911th Tactical Airlift Group emblem

The 911th Airlift Wing is an Air Mobility Command-gained unit of the Air Force Reserve Command (AFRC), based out of Pittsburgh Air Reserve Station at the Pittsburgh International Airport, Pennsylvania.

== Overview ==
The 911th Airlift Wing's mission is to organize, recruit and train Air Force Reserve personnel to provide strategic airlift of airborne forces, their equipment and supplies and delivery of these forces and materials by airdrop, landing or cargo extraction systems.

== Units ==
- 911th Operations Group (911 OG)

758th Airlift Squadron (758 AS)
911th Aeromedical Evacuation Squadron (911 AES)

- 911th Maintenance Group (911 MXG)
- 911th Mission Support Group (911 MSG)

911th Aeromedical Staging Squadron (911 ASTS)

== History ==
=== Need for reserve troop carrier groups ===
During the first half of 1955, the Air Force began detaching Air Force Reserve squadrons from their parent wing locations to separate sites. The concept offered several advantages. Communities were more likely to accept the smaller squadrons than the large wings and the location of separate squadrons in smaller population centers would facilitate recruiting and manning. Continental Air Command (ConAC)'s plan called for placing Air Force Reserve units at fifty-nine installations located throughout the United States. When these relocations were completed in 1959, reserve wing headquarters and wing support elements would typically be on one base, along with one (or in some cases two) of the wing's flying squadrons, while the remaining flying squadrons were spread over thirty-five Air Force, Navy and civilian airfields under what was called the Detached Squadron Concept.

Although this dispersal was not a problem when the entire wing was called to active service, mobilizing a single flying squadron and elements to support it proved difficult. This weakness was demonstrated in the partial mobilization of reserve units during the Berlin Crisis of 1961 To resolve this, at the start of 1962, Continental Air Command, (ConAC) determined to reorganize its reserve wings by establishing groups with support elements for each of its troop carrier squadrons. This reorganization would facilitate mobilization of elements of wings in various combinations when needed. However, as this plan was entering its implementation phase, another partial mobilization occurred for the Cuban Missile Crisis, with the units being released on 22 November 1962. The formation of troop carrier groups occurred in January 1963 for units that had not been mobilized, but was delayed until February for those that had been.

=== Activation of 911th Troop Carrier Group ===
As a result, the 911th Troop Carrier Group was established at Greater Pittsburgh International Airport on 17 January 1963, as the headquarters for the 758th Troop Carrier Squadron, which had been stationed there since November 1957. Along with group headquarters, a Combat Support Squadron, Materiel Squadron and a Tactical Infirmary were organized to support the 758th.

The group mission was to organize, recruit and train Air Force reserve personnel in the tactical airlift of airborne forces, their equipment and supplies and delivery of these forces and materials by airdrop, landing or cargo extraction systems. The group was equipped with Fairchild C-119 Flying Boxcars for Tactical Air Command airlift operations.

The 911th Group was one of three C-119 groups assigned to the 459th Troop Carrier Wing in 1963, the others being the 909th Troop Carrier Group at Andrews Air Force Base, Maryland, and the 910th Troop Carrier Group at Youngstown Municipal Airport, Ohio.

The 911th trained for and participated in air transport of airborne forces, equipment and supplies with delivery by airdrop, extraction, and airlanding, as well as air evacuation within a theater of operations. It provided airlift to Southeast Asia during the Vietnam War and for other contingency operations, such as the Dominican Republic crisis in 1965, as well as numerous humanitarian flights. Beginning in 1973, it periodically rotated flight crews and other personnel to Panama, and later Puerto Rico, to support United States Southern Command commitments. Since the early 1990s it has frequently deployed personnel in support of contingency operations in Southwest Asia and the Balkans.

A news story in the 10 April 2012 edition of the Air Force Times stated the 911th's base was being considered for closure by 2013. As of 2021, the future of the base is on solid ground. There are no plans to close it.

=== Modern Era ===
During the first week of April 2019, three out of the eight C-17s assigned to the 911th AW were delivered to the unit, to replace the wing's elderly C-130s. As of April 2020, seven C-17s are based in Pittsburgh with the final aircraft in depot maintenance.

In April 2020, the 911th AW was one of 25 reserve units deployed to Joint Base McGuire-Dix-Lakehurst, New Jersey to participate in relief efforts amid the COVID-19 pandemic in New York City. Ten airmen from the 911th AW were part of a 125-member team mobilized to assist with medical support.

=== Lineage ===
- Established as the 911th Troop Carrier Group, Medium and activated on 28 December 1962 (not organized)

Organized in the Reserve on 17 January 1963
Redesignated 911th Military Airlift Group on 1 January 1967
Redesignated 911th Tactical Airlift Group on 1 March 1972
Redesignated 911th Airlift Group on 1 February 1992
Redesignated 911th Airlift Wing on 1 October 1994

=== Assignments ===
- Continental Air Command, 28 December 1962 (not organized)
- 459th Troop Carrier Wing (later 459th Military Airlift Wing), 17 January 1963
- 94th Military Airlift Wing, 21 April 1971
- 302d Tactical Airlift Wing, 25 February 1972
- 439th Tactical Airlift Wing (later 439th Military Airlift Wing, 439th Airlift Wing), 1 October 1980
- 94th Airlift Wing, 1 August 1992
- Tenth Air Force, 1 October 1994
- Twenty-Second Air Force, 1 April 1997 – 31 March 2018
- Fourth Air Force, 1 April 2018 – present

=== Components ===
- 911th Operations Group: 1 August 1992 – present
- 758th Troop Carrier Squadron (later 758th Military Airlift Squadron, 758th Tactical Airlift Squadron, 758th Military Airlift Squadron: 17 January 1963 - 1 August 1992

=== Stations ===
- Pittsburgh IAP Air Reserve Station, Pennsylvania, 17 January 1963 – present

=== Aircraft ===
- Fairchild C-119 Flying Boxcar (1963–1967)
- Douglas C-124 Globemaster II (1966–1972)
- Fairchild C-123 Provider (1972–1980)
- Lockheed C-130 Hercules (1980–2018)
- Boeing C-17 Globemaster III (2018–present)

=== Aircraft flying in this unit ===
C-17A
Tail #	89-1189
Tail #	92-3292
Tail #	93-0601
Tail #	96-0001
Tail #	00-0180
Tail #	00-0184
Tail #	02-1099
Tail #	02-1101
