= List of airfields of the United States Army Air Forces Fourth Air Force =

The list of Airfields of the United States Army Air Forces Fourth Air Force is as follows:

Tactical Airfields

- Bellingham International Airport
- Blythe Airport
- Charles M. Schulz–Sonoma County Airport
- Desert Center Airport
- Hamilton Army Airfield
- Jacqueline Cochran Regional Airport
- McChord Field
- Muroc Army Air Base
- Paso Robles Municipal Airport
- Portland Army Air Base
- Rice Army Airfield
- Visalia Municipal Airport

Group Training Stations

- Desert Center Airport
- Ephrata Municipal Airport
- Hamilton Army Airfield
- Jacqueline Cochran Regional Airport
- March Field
- McChord Field
- Muroc Army Air Base
- Oroville Municipal Airport
- Paso Robles Municipal Airport
- Portland Army Air Base
- Rice Army Airfield
- Tonopah Army Air Field
- Visalia Municipal Airport

Replacement Training Stations

- Barstow-Daggett Airport
- Buchanan Field Airport
- Catalina Airport
- Charles M. Schulz–Sonoma County Airport
- Chiriaco Summit Airport
- Coalinga Municipal Airport (Old)
- Corcoran Airport
- Delano Municipal Airport
- Eastern Sierra Regional Airport
- Fresno Chandler Executive Airport
- Grand Central Airport (California)
- Haigh Field Airport
- Half Moon Bay Airport
- Hamilton Army Airfield
- Hayward Executive Airport
- Naval Air Station Lemoore
- March Field
- Meadows Field Airport
- Montague Airport (California)
- Napa County Airport
- Needles Airport
- Olympia Regional Airport
- Palmdale Army Airfield
- Paso Robles Municipal Airport
- Porterville Municipal Airport
- Portland Army Air Base
- Redding Municipal Airport
- Sacramento Executive Airport
- Salinas Municipal Airport
- Siskiyou County Airport
- Tonopah Army Air Field
- United States Air Force Plant 42
- Van Nuys Air National Guard Base
- Visalia Municipal Airport
- Willows-Glenn County Airport
- Yuba County Airport

== Sources ==
- R. Frank Futrell, “The Development of Base Facilities,” in The Army Air Forces in World War II, vol. 6, Men and Planes, ed. Wesley Frank Craven and James Lea Cate, 142 (Washington, D.C., Office of Air Force History, new imprint, 1983).
