= List of accidents and incidents involving military aircraft (1943–1944) =

This is a list of accidents and incidents involving military aircraft grouped by the year in which the accident or incident occurred. Not all of the aircraft were in operation at the time. For more exhaustive lists, see the Aircraft Crash Record Office or the Air Safety Network or the Dutch Scramble Website Brush and Dustpan Database. Combat losses are not included except for a very few cases denoted by singular circumstances.

== Aircraft terminology ==
Information on aircraft gives the type, and if available, the serial number of the operator in italics, the constructors number, also known as the manufacturer's serial number (c/n), exterior codes in apostrophes, nicknames (if any) in quotation marks, flight callsign in italics, and operating units.

== 1943 ==
January (?)
"Aviation Cadet Henry A. McGinnis, East Falls Church, Va., crashed within a block of his own home recently while on a routine training flight from the Naval Air Base at Anacostia. He was taken to the Naval Medical Center at Bethesda, Maryland, where his condition was reported not serious."
1 January
The sole Lockheed XP-49, 40-3055, a development of the P-38 Lightning, first flown 11 November 1942, suffers a crash landing at Burbank, California when the port landing gear fails to lock down due to a combined hydraulic and electrical problem. Pilot was Joe C. Towle. Repaired, it returns to flight on 16 February 1943, and is sent to Wright Field, Ohio, for further testing. Despite improved performance over the P-38, difficulties with the new engines, as well as the success of the Republic P-47 Thunderbolt and the P-51 Mustang, leads to no additional orders or production.

3 January
Boeing B-17F-27-BO Flying Fortress, 41-24620, c/n 3305, "snap! crackle! pop!", 'PU-O', of the 360th Bomb Squadron, 303rd Bomb Group, on daylight raid over Saint-Nazaire, France, loses wing due to flak, goes into spiral. Ball turret gunner Alan Eugene Magee (1919–2003), though suffering 27 shrapnel wounds, bails out (or is thrown from wreckage) without his chute at ~20,000 feet (6,100 m), loses consciousness due to altitude, freefall plunges through glass roof of the Gare de Saint-Nazaire and is found alive but with serious injuries on floor of depot:saved by German medical care, spends rest of war in prison camp. On 3 January 1993, the people of St. Nazaire honored Magee and the crew of his bomber by erecting a 6-foot-tall (1.8 m) memorial to them.

6 January
At 1735 CWT, three miles W of White City, Kansas, a Consolidated B-24D-13-CO Liberator, 41-23961, c/n 756, of the 469th Bomb Squadron, 333d Bomb Group, out of Topeka Army Air Base, Kansas, piloted by Robert Clyne, suffers a catastrophic structural failure due to ice. All are killed instantly except for Lt Maleckas, who makes it out with a parachute.

6 January
Consolidated B-24D-20-CO Liberator, 41-24202, c/n 997, of the 504th Bomb Squadron, 346th Bomb Group, out of Smoky Hill Army Air Field, Kansas, suffers fire in flight, crashes 15 miles SW of Madill, Oklahoma, destroyed by fire. Pilot was R. G. Bishop.

13 January
Junkers Ju 290 V1, (Junkers Ju 90 V11), modified from Ju 90B-1, Werknummer 90 0007, D-AFHG, "Oldenberg", crashed on takeoff evacuating load of wounded troops from the German 6th Army at Stalingrad. The need for large capacity transports was so dire at this point that the Luftwaffe was taking Ju 290As straight from the assembly line into operation.

15 January
Prototype Commonwealth Aircraft Corporation CA-4 Wackett Bomber, A23-1001, crashes on a test flight to assess powerplant performance and evaluate aerodynamic effects of a new fixed leading edge slat. During return to CAC airfield at Fisherman's Bend, Australia, pilot Sqn. Leader Jim Harper detects fuel leak in port Pratt & Whitney R-1830 engine; as problem worsens he attempts shut-down and feathering of propeller but actuation of feathering switch causes explosion and uncontrollable fire. Crew of three attempts evacuation at 1000 feet (300 m), but only pilot Harper succeeds in parachuting, CAC test pilot Jim Carter and CAC power plant group engineer Lionel Dudgeon KWF. Airframe impacts ~three miles SW of Kilmore, Victoria. Wreckage recovered by No. 26 Repair and Salvage Unit on 18 January, delivered to No. 1 Aircraft Depot, RAAF Laverton, on the 19th. Final action taken on 26 January when the Air Member for Supply and Equipment approves "conversion to components" for what remains of the CA-4.

21 January
Pan Am Flight 1104, a Martin M-130, the Philippine Clipper, being operated by Pan American Airways for the U.S. Navy, en route from Honolulu to San Francisco, crashes in northern California, in bad weather and poor visibility, killing 19, including 10 Navy passengers. ComSubPac Admiral Robert H. English is killed.

29 January
A Douglas B-23 Dragon, 39-052, c/n 2738, of the 390th Bomb Squadron, 42d Bomb Group, assigned at McChord Field, Washington, piloted by Lt. Robert Orr, attempts ferry flight from Tonopah, Nevada, back to McChord Field, with eight aboard, but runs into a snowstorm and has to divert to Gowen Field, Boise, Idaho. Unable to locate another landing field and running low on fuel, pilot spots a clearing which is actually frozen Loon Lake in the Payette National Forest, Stevens County, Washington, and attempts landing, with one engine afire, but overshoots and shears wings as it crashes into a grove of trees on the shore. Only two of eight suffer injuries; wreckage sighted 13 February by veteran civilian pilot Penn Stohr, flying his own private plane from Cascade to Warren, who reports to Gowen Field seeing three men, apparently in uniform, standing around the downed fuselage. His attention was drawn by a string of trees along the south shore with their tops sheared off. Five airmen who remained with the aircraft are rescued by Stohr who twice landed his ski-equipped plane on the lake. Three others who left the crash site to seek help reach the Lake Fork ranger station unaided on 16 February, and telephone Gowen Field. The station is 12 miles E of McCall, and 15 miles SW of Loon Lake. Wreckage is largely still where it came to rest.

5 February
Douglas A-20 Havoc, 39–735, modified as prototype Douglas XP-70 night fighter, assigned to the 349th Night Fighter Squadron, 50th Fighter Group (Special), crashes on takeoff from Kissimmee Army Airfield, Florida, coming down 1/2 mile NW of the field, killing pilot James H. Toal. The Army Air Force decides at the end of March that the airframe is beyond repair and scraps it.

5 February
A Douglas C-49K, piloted by Anthony R. Mensing, (a DC-3-455 ordered by TWA as NC43982, but taken over by the USAAF before delivery) en route from Fort Nelson, British Columbia, Canada, to Seattle, Washington, crashed 76 miles SW of Fort Nelson at the 8,500 foot level of Mount Mary Henry, killing all eleven on board. The wreckage was discovered by a party of hunters in 1948. The remains were removed in September 1948 by pack horse and seaplane "from the almost inaccessible peak where the plane crashed," to Tuchodi Lake, 20 miles away. There they were loaded aboard a Canadian air force plane to bring them to Fort Nelson. "Removal of the skeletons and the investigation of the wreckage are under the direction of Maj. Max E. Van Bethuysen of the United States air force, aided by Squadron Leader Maxwell Strange of the Canadian air force and Constable William Bolton of British Columbia. Major Van Bethuysen said no trace of gold bullion or currency has been found amid the wreckage. Debris is scattered over a square mile of the mountainside above the timberline, however, and some of it is buried under 9 feet of rock which has fallen from the cliffs rising approximately 1,000 feet above the site. Early rumors that the ill-fated C-49, which crashed Feb. 5, 1943, ... carried nearly half a million dollars in gold and currency, previously were denied by the air force in Washington. However, the searchers found moldy war department documents in United States mail sacks which also contained envelopes addressed to the United States treasury and hundreds of letters from servicemen in Alaska and the Aleutians to their relatives and friends at home. A rubber oxygen mask that had survived the elements still was on the pilot's skull. The investigators said that some scraps of metal from the plane were fused, indicating part of the wreckage had burned. The wide scattering of the debris was taken to indicate that the plane had either had struck the peak with terrific impact, or that it exploded in midair."

8 February
The second Bell XP-39E Airacobra (of three), 41-19502, is damaged during a forced landing when a Wright Field test pilot runs out of fuel short of Niagara Falls Airport, New York, where the Bell Aircraft plant is located.

9 February
"San Francisco, February 9, (AP) – A two-motored navy bomber from the Alameda naval air station crashed into San Francisco bay and exploded, killing all five members of the crew. The 12th naval district said the ship, on a test flight, had radioed that one engine was failing and that she was returning to base. Just as the plane was ready to come in for a landing, it was seen to dive abruptly into the bay a few hundred feet offshore from the naval station. An explosion shattered the ship as it struck the water, and a few minutes later the crew of a crash barge from the air station was able to find only scattered wreckage on the water."

11 February
The Boeing B-17F-50-BO Flying Fortress, 42-5367, of the 317th Bomb Squadron, 88th Bomb Group, with ten aboard goes missing on flight from Walla Walla Army Air Base, Washington. Civil Air Patrol planes spot the wreckage on 14 February in the Blue Mountains, 17 miles E of Walla Walla, where the bomber apparently flew head-on into a ridge at about the 5,000 foot level. Ground parties reach the site on 16 February and confirm the crew dead.

12 February
Eight of nine crew are killed aboard Consolidated B-24D-35-CO Liberator, 42-40144, c/n 1221, of the 528th Bomb Squadron, 380th Bomb Group, Biggs Field, Texas, piloted by Charles C. Wylie, when it suffers engine failure that results in a stall/spin condition, coming down eight miles NW of Roswell, New Mexico, according to a crash report, and five miles N of Roswell according to the Associated Press. One crewman successfully parachuted to safety.

Mid-February
Blohm & Voss BV 222 V1, X4+AH, of air transport squadron Lufttransportstaffel 222 (LTS 222), sinks following a collision with a submerged wreck while landing at Piraeus harbour, Greece. Between 1942 and 1943, the aircraft flew in the Mediterranean theatre.

17 February
A Consolidated B-24D-53-CO Liberator, 42-40355, c/n 1432, crashed at Tucson Municipal Airport #2, Tucson, Arizona. Six Consolidated Aircraft employees riding as passengers were killed and several others injured, of the 34 passengers on board. The damaged airframe was subsequently modified into the first C-87 Liberator Express.

18 February
Second prototype Boeing XB-29 Superfortress, 41-003, crashes into factory at Seattle, Washington after R-3350 engine catches fire, killing all 10 crew including chief test pilot Edmund T. "Eddie" Allen along with 20 on the ground.

22 February
Boeing 314, Pan American "Yankee Clipper", NC18603, c/n 1990, (U.S. Navy BuNo 48224), crashes into the Tagus River near Lisbon, while on approach to Portugal by way of the Azores. Caught in a storm, the flying boat hooked a wingtip in a turn while attempting an emergency landing. 25 of 39 on board die. Among those killed are actress Tamara Drasin and international journalist Ben Robertson, en route to his new job, chief of the New York Herald-Tribune's London bureau. Actress Jane Froman is seriously injured. Her story of survival will be made into the 1952 film "With a Song in My Heart" starring Susan Hayward.

10 March
North American B-25C Mitchell, 41-12740, of the 473d Bombardment Squadron (Medium), 334th Bombardment Group (Medium), (activated as a combat crew training group on 16 July 1942) en route from Greenville Army Air Base, South Carolina, to Key Field, Meridian, Mississippi, crashed into the Blue Ridge Mountains ~21 miles N of Walhalla in Pickens County, South Carolina, at about midnight, killing all five crew "apparently instantaneously." The aircraft was assigned at Greenville AAB. Despite a large-scale search by army aircraft along the route from Greenville to Meridian, the wreckage was finally found 21 March 1943 by a 15-year-old mountain boy, Seab Crane, who was riding a horse along a remote path known as the Moody trail. The bomber had clipped off treetops at the peak of a mountain, just off Turnpike road about 2 1/2 miles from the Walhalla State Fish Hatchery, and plunged into a ravine. The altitude where the plane first struck is more than 2,000 feet. Heavy recent rains kept the crash fire isolated to the actual wreckage. One of the motors and the gasoline tank had burned, but only a few square yards of woods had burned. "After Rogers and Crane had found the wrecked ship they reported it to R. A. Stewart at the Fish Hatchery, an aircraft warning service spotter. Stewart put in a 'red flash' call to the filter center in Columbia and immediately afterwards notified Derrill B. Darby, of Walhalla, chief of the aircraft warning service in Oconee county. That was shortly before 1 o'clock Monday afternoon." After the wreckage had been viewed, home guardsmen took charge and kept watch until army men from the Greenville air base arrived. The victims were: Flight Officer Richard S. Brook, 22, pilot, of 10 Superior Court, Lima, Ohio; Second Lieutenant Earl S. Monroe, 26, co-pilot, of Bolivar, New York; Second Lieutenant Philip J. Graziano, 23, navigator, of 166 Chestnut Street, Lawrence, Massachusetts; Staff Sergeant Harvey M. Capellman, engineer, of Blanchard, Idaho; and Sergeant Michael Sekel, 29, radio operator, of Buffalo, Ohio. "Soldiers, home guardsmen, and volunteers labored into the night to remove the bodies and carry them on stretchers up the steep mountain side to the ambulance. Salvage of the wrecked ship was started on Tuesday." A later report stated that the B-25 was en route TO Greenville Army Air Base from Meridian, Mississippi. A memorial marker to the crew was dedicated at the site on 21 March 2014 by the Walhalla American Legion and the Oconee Veterans Council.

18 March
A Douglas SBD-4 Dauntless hits the rail of the control tower and smashes into the ground at MCAAS Mojave, California, demolishing the airframe. "The flat-hatting pilot was taken to the hospital with 'multiple, extreme injuries.' Incredibly, the mechanic riding as a passenger walked away with only minor cuts and bruises."

23 March
Waco UC-72A, 42-68676, c/n 5150, civilian Waco ARE, ex-NC29376, impressed by USAAF, flown by Roy F. Brown, of the 5th Ferrying Squadron, 3rd Ferrying Group, out of Romulus Army Airfield, Michigan, is wrecked this date at Hebron, Kentucky.

23 March
A Republic P-47C-2-RE Thunderbolt, 41-6292, of the 328th Fighter Squadron, 352d Fighter Group, crashes into Barnard Hall at Hofstra College shortly after take-off from Mitchel Field, Long Island, New York, early this date, hitting the west side near the roof, setting the building afire, police announced. Pilot Earl D. Hayward died. The blaze was brought under control within 45 minutes by firemen from Hempstead, East Meadow and Uniondale. No students were in the vicinity at the time. The Eastern Defense Command in New York City announced that the pilot was killed. He had taken off from Mitchel Field on a training mission shortly before the crash. This crash led to the abandonment of the use of Runway 18/36 at Mitchel Field.

4 April
North American B-25C Mitchell, 41-12634, of the 376th Bomb Squadron, 309th Bomb Group (M), ditches in Lake Murray, South Carolina, during skip-bombing practice, after starboard engine failure. Crew of five escapes before Mitchell sinks after seven minutes afloat, about two miles (3 km) west of the Saluda Dam in 150 feet (46 m) of water. On 19 September 2005, the bomber was raised to the surface by aircraft recoverer Gary Larkins for preservation (not restoration) at the Southern Museum of Flight, Birmingham, Alabama.

9 April
Lockheed P-38G-10-LO Lightning, 42-12937, flown by Col. Benjamin S. Kelsey, gets into an inverted spin during dive flap test, loses one wing and entire tail section. Kelsey bails out, suffers broken ankle, while P-38 hits flat on hillside near Calabasas, California.

13 April
Martin B-26B-2 Marauder, 41-17945, of the 480th Bomb Squadron (Medium), 336th Bomb Group (Medium), Avon Park Army Air Field, Florida, while on a training flight crashes and is destroyed by fire at Daniel Army Air Field, Augusta, Georgia. All seven crew are killed. The base public relations office at Avon Park identified the victims as 1st Lt. Robert L. Floyd, McLean, Texas, pilot; 2d Lt. Richard C. Larsen, Rochester, Minnesota; S/Sgt. Carl Justh, York Haven, Pennsylvania; Sgt. Charles S. Elder, Banning, California; Sgt. Lewis F. Haimi, Palmerton, Pennsylvania; Cpl. Woodrow O. Rosell, San Antonio, Texas; and Pvt. James S. Nelson, Seattle, Washington.

14 April
The crash of Curtiss O-52 Owl, 40-2780, c/n 14313, of the 392d Observation Training Squadron, Brooks Field, Texas, when it spins in a short distance from that base, kills 2d Lt. Robert E. Kuhn, 23, Chicago, pilot, and 2d Lt. Robert O. Fechtner, 21, Boling, Texas, observer.

14 April
Two RAAF Bristol Beaufort torpedo bombers, in a flight of three, collided with each other over Jervis Bay. They were A9-27 and A9-268 of Base Torpedo Unit, HMAS Albatros, Nowra, Australia, carrying out a series of dummy runs and torpedo attacks on HMAS Burra Bra for a group of accredited War Correspondents on board the ship when the centre aircraft of the vic, A9-27, coded 'B', pulled up, causing the port wing of the right-hand bomber, A9-268, coded 'I', to clip off its tail with both aircraft crashing. The flight was attempting a "Prince of Wales" break-up formation. KWF aboard A9-27 were F/O Raymond Sydney Green (408110), 23, pilot; Sgt. Albert John Bailey (409976), 22; F/O Maurice Francis Hoban (409118), 30; and P/O Eric William Sweetnam (408077), 20. Fatalities aboard A9-268 were Flt. Lt. David George Dey (280627), 27, pilot; F/O Rex Lindsay Solomon (408149), 21; F/O Jack Norman (407561); and Sgt. Hugh Sydney George Richardson (410093), 23. The accident was filmed by Fox Movietone News cameraman Eric Bieve, and footage is available on the web. "Green, Hoban and Bailey were buried in the Air Force section of the War Cemetery at Nowra on 15 Apr 43 at 1500 hours. The funeral was attended by Wing Commander Dibbs, Base Torpedo Unit (BTU) staff officers, Instructional crews and personnel of No 7 Beaufort course. On 17 April 1943, the body of Sweetnam was recovered and buried at 1600 hours with Air Force honours at Nowra. Late on the same day a diving party reported that they had not located the bodies of Dey, Norman, Solomon and Richardson. A Funeral held on 18 April 1943 on board the "Burra-Bra" at 1030 hours attended by the same people as listed for the 15 April Funeral."

18 April
Messerschmitt Me 262 V2, WrkNr. 262 000 002, PC+UB, is completely destroyed on a test flight out of Lechfeld, its 48th flight, this date, killing pilot Ofw. Wilhelm Ostertag, after being airborne only seven minutes. "It was thought that the cause was in part due to a disturbance in the tail plane adjustment, but a later investigation found that a section of a rear part of one of the engines had detached and blocked the engine, forcing the aircraft into an uncontrollable downward spiral." Airframe flight time was 18 hours 17 minutes.

29 April
Republic P-43 Lancer, 41-6718, converted to P-43D. To RAAF as A56-7. Assigned to 1 PRU, it went missing in flight from Wagga, Australia, this date. Aircraft found crashed in thick forest on the side of Gordon Gully near Healesville in Victoria, NE of Melbourne, in June 1958. The airframe was approved as a write-off on 30 April. The pilot was P/O A. W. Green (406393) of 1 PRU Rear Echelon based at Laverton. His body has not been found.

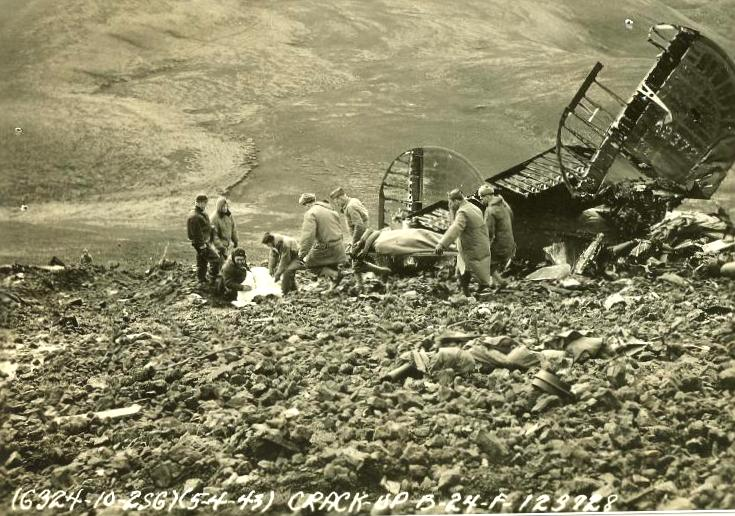
U.S. Army personnel remove bodies from the wreckage of General Frank Maxwell Andrews' B-24D after it struck a mountain side in Iceland, 3 May 1943. The rudders and elevators have lost their fabric covering after the accident

3 May
During an inspection tour, Lt. Gen. Frank Maxwell Andrews (1884–1943) is killed in crash of Consolidated B-24D-1-CO Liberator, 41-23728, "Hot Stuff", of the 330th Bomb Squadron, 93d Bomb Group, 8th Air Force, out of RAF Bovingdon, England, on Mt. Fagradalsfjall on the Reykjanes peninsula after an aborted attempt to land at the RAF Kaldadarnes, Iceland. Andrews and thirteen others died in the crash; only the tail gunner, S/Sgt. George A. Eisel, survived. Others KWF included pilot Capt. Robert H. Shannon, of the 330th BS, 93rd BG; six members of Andrews' staff, including Maj. Ted Trotman, B/Gen. Charlie Barth, Col. Marlow Krum, and the general's aide, Maj. Fred A. Chapman; and Capt. J. H. Gott, navigator. Andrews was the highest-ranking Allied officer to die in the line of duty to that point in the war. At the time of his death, he was Commanding General, United States Forces, European Theatre of Operations. Camp Springs Army Air Field, Maryland, is renamed Andrews Field (later Andrews Air Force Base), for him on 7 February 1945. It appears that "Hot Stuff" was actually the first heavy bomber to complete 25 missions successfully, despite the publicity given the "Memphis Belle" and "Hell's Angels" of the 303d Bomb Group, when the B-24 bombed Naples on 7 February 1943. The bomber was, in fact, on the first leg of a trip back to the United States for a War Bond Tour when she was lost.

6 May
Curtiss XP-60D-CU 41-19508 (the second Curtiss XP-53-CU re-designated), crashed at Rome Air Depot, New York.

Circa 7 May
The first prototype of the VL Myrsky (State Aircraft Factory Storm), a low-wing single-seat cantilever monoplane fighter completed on 30 April 1943, crashes "a week later."

8 May
A USAAF Douglas C-33, 36–85, c/n 1518, of the 482d Air Base Squadron, is written off at Hill Field, Ogden, Utah, when the landing gear retracts on take off. Pilot was William B. Cline.

10 May
First Consolidated XB-32 Dominator, 41–141, crashes on take-off at Lindbergh Field, San Diego, probably from flap failure. This was one of only two twin-finned B-32s (41–142 was the other) – all subsequent had a PB4Y-style single tail.

10 May
First Curtiss YC-76 Caravan constructed at the Louisville, Kentucky plant, 42-86918, loses tail unit at 1729 hrs. due to lack of "forgotten" securing bolts during test flight, crashes at Okolona, Kentucky, killing three Curtiss-Wright test crew, pilot Ed Schubinger, co-pilot John L. "Duke" Trowbridge, and engineer Robert G. Scudder. All-wood cargo design is cancelled by the USAAF on 3 August with only nineteen completed, all grounded by 12 September 1944. Four Curtiss C-76 Caravans at the St. Louis, Missouri plant are granted one-time flight clearance and flown directly to Air Training Command bases for use as instructional airframes.

16 May
Handley Page Halifax B Mk V bomber suffered starboard inner engine failure shortly after takeoff from RAF Holmsley South en route to RAF Hurn. Crashed in Thatcher's Lane, Sopley, at grid reference OS SZ164986. All on board were killed. The names of those that died are: Donald J Smith ( J10798 Fg Offr RCAF Pilot ), M.W. Collins (J10509 Fg Offr RCAF Pilot ), Barrie Noel Stephenson ( RAFVR Flight Engineer ), P.S. Thomas ( Gunner ), Frances Joseph Davies ( Sgt Glider Pilot passenger ), Roland Davies Sunter ( Sgt Glider Pilot passenger ) and Ronald Herbert Borton ( Sgt Glider Pilot passenger ).

19 May
The 1943 RAF Hudson crash was an aerial accident that killed two people. The aircraft crashed in a forced landing attempt near RAF St Eval, Cornwall, England, following engine failure. Lockheed Hudson IIIA, FH168, a lend-lease A-29-LO, 41-36969, c/n 414-6458, operated by No. 38 Wing RAF, based at RAF Netheravon, crashed and burned 7 miles (11 km) south of St. Eval. The aircraft was unable to maintain height due to one engine failing, and the load it was carrying. Air Commodore Sir Nigel Norman, en route to the Middle East for an Airborne Forces Planning Conference, died in this accident.

19 May
Northrop N-9M-1, one-third scale flying testbed for the Northrop XB-35 flying wing design, crashes approximately 12 mi (19 km) W of Muroc Army Air Base, California, killing pilot Max Constant. First flown 27 December 1942, airframe had only logged 22.5 hours, and little data was accumulated before the loss. Post-crash investigation suggested that: "...while Constant was conducting stalls and aft centre of gravity stability tests, aerodynamic forces developed full aft, which were too strong for Constant to overcome, trapping him in the cockpit. To prevent this happening on future flights, a one-shot hydraulic boost device was installed to push the controls forward in an emergency."

20 May
A Consolidated B-24E-5-FO Liberator, 42-7053, c/n 77, of the 1014th Pilot Transition Training Squadron, Tarrant Army Airfield, Texas, hit the side of a 20 million cubic foot gasometer of the People's Gas Light and Coke Company at 3625 73rd Street and Central Park Avenue, the largest of its type in the world, ~2 miles SE of Municipal Airport, killing all 12 crew. Joe Baugher cites date as 5 May 1943, but this is incorrect. Approaching the airport from the southwest in light rain, light fog and light smoke, with a 500 foot ceiling and ~.75 miles visibility, the bomber circled the field to the north and east before striking the ~500 foot tall tank at the ~125 foot level whilst on a southern heading, initially with the port wingtip, according to witness Lawrence Kinsella, an employee of People's Gas Light and Coke Company. Much of forward fuselage fell inside the tank structure which exploded, throwing steel plate over 100 yards with heat felt over a mile away. Nine employees were on the grounds but none were injured. The storage tank was erected in 1928 at a cost of $2 million, according to a Chicago Daily Tribune account. It was not rebuilt.

28 May
The loss of US Navy Curtiss SB2C-1 Helldiver, BuNo 00154, of VB-5, during launch near Trinidad on 28 May 1943 during the shakedown cruise of the USS Yorktown was incorporated by 20th Century Fox into the 1944 film Wing and a Prayer: The Story of Carrier X.
30 May
Boeing B-17F-45-BO Flying Fortress, 42-5318, of the 464th Bombardment Squadron, 331st Bombardment Group, out of Casper Army Air Field, Wyoming, piloted by James O. Westbury, after departing Marysville Army Airfield crashes into a mountainside 15 miles NE of Covelo, California while on a training flight to Eugene, Oregon, killing all six people on board. The wreckage of the missing plane finally discovered on the weekend of 7–8 August 1943. Badly burned bodies could not be immediately identified.

June
Second production Mitsubishi J2M2 Raiden (Thunderbolt), Allied codename "Jack", noses over shortly after take-off and crashes for unknown reasons. When pilot of tenth production J2M2 experiences same phenomenon just after gear-retraction on test flight, he has enough altitude to drop gear and recover. It is discovered that retractable tailwheel shock strut can press against elevator torque tube during retraction, forcing control stick full-forward. This is modified and fighter production resumes.

2 June
An hour into a routine training flight from the USS Lexington (CV-16) over the Gulf of Paria off Venezuela, 1939 Heisman Trophy winner Ensign Nile Kinnick, USNR, develops severe oil leak at 0951 hrs., cannot recover to either the carrier or land, and ditches his Grumman F4F-4 Wildcat, BuNo 12042, at Lat. 10° 28' N, Long. 62° 02' 15" W, at 0952 hrs. Although rescue forces arrive at the scene in eight minutes, neither he nor his plane are found, only an oil slick. Kinnick was the first Heisman winner to die. The University of Iowa renamed their football stadium "Kinnick Stadium" in 1972.

3 June
A Boeing B-17F-55-DL Flying Fortress, 42-3399, "Scharazad", of the Plummer Provisional Group, 318th Bomb Squadron, flying to Grand Island, Nebraska from Pendleton Army Air Base in Oregon crashes on Bomber Mountain in the Big Horn Mountains of Wyoming. 10 crew members were killed. Wreckage finally discovered on 12 August 1945.

4 June
RAF Supermarine Spitfire Mk.Vc, AR512, of 312 (Czech) squadron based at Churchstanton in the Blackdown Hills hits a train while conducting a mock-attack near Bradford-on-Tone just west of Norton Fitzwarren. The roof of at least one carriage is ripped off and several passengers, mainly WRENs, are killed. The plane flies on before eventually crashing near Castle Cary. The pilot, F/O Jaroslav Cermak, dies and is buried in Taunton.

13 June
Blohm & Voss BV 138C-1, WNr.0310158, K6+AK, of 2.Staffel KüstenFlieger Gruppe 406, capsizes upon landing at Drontheim See Ilsvika in Trondheim harbour, Norway. Crew has to swim underwater to escape. Oblt. Ludwig Schönherr, wounded; Ltn. Günther Behr, wounded; Uffz. Heinz Kitzmann, unhurt; Uffz. Reinhold Zwanzig, unhurt; Ofw. Ernst Neumann, drowned. His body is recovered from inside the flying boat when it is recovered the following day.

14 June
Boeing B-17C Flying Fortress, 40-2072, "Miss E.M.F." (Every Morning Fixing), of the 19th Bomb Group, heavily damaged on Davao mission 25 December 1941 and converted into transport. With 46th Troop Carrier Squadron, 317th Troop Carrier Group, crashed Bakers Creek, Queensland, Australia, this date while ferrying troops to New Guinea. Six crew and 34 GIs killed. One survived. (see Bakers Creek air crash) A memorial to the victims of this crash was installed at the Selfridge Gate of Arlington National Cemetery on 11 June 2009, donated by the Bakers Creek Memorial Association. The gate is named for Lt. Thomas Selfridge, killed in a 1908 crash at Fort Myer, Virginia, the first victim of a powered air accident.

16 June
Boeing XB-38-VE, 41-2401, powered with Allison V-1710 liquid-cooled engines, crashed near Tipton, California, on its ninth test flight when the number three (starboard inner) engine caught fire. Attempts to extinguish it were unsuccessful, and as the fire spread to the wing, the pilots bailed out after pointing the aircraft to an uninhabited area. Lockheed test pilot George MacDonald was killed when his parachute did not deploy, and Lockheed test pilot Bud Martin was seriously injured when his parachute did not deploy properly.

1 July
US Navy Consolidated PBY-5 Catalina, BuNo 04447, returning to Naval Air Station Pensacola, Florida, after anti-submarine patrol flight over the Gulf of Mexico, attempts ill-advised landing in a storm brought on by a passing weather front, hits swell, bounces twice and overturns in Pensacola Bay. Nose section breaks away right at the wing tower and sinks, taking with it U.S. Coast Guard Motor Machinists Mate Chief Dana W. Heckart, in the co-pilot's seat as a pilot trainee. Rest of crew, all U.S. Navy personnel, pilot Ltjg. John W. Nichols, Lt. Norman Bennett, Ens. Francis R. Young, AMM3c Van C. Hardin, AM3c William E. Mutch, AMM2c Robert H. Ovink, ASM3c Albert W. Smith, and ARM3c Ralph E. Stuckey, survive as rest of airframe floats. Hardin, Mutch, Ovink and Smith suffer minor injuries, rest of crew more seriously injured. A seaplane wrecking derrick (YSD) retrieves floating section the following day. Heckart's body never recovered. Investigation finds pilot Nichols at fault for trying to land in storm conditions.

3 July
Armstrong Whitworth Whitley Mk.V, LA877, 'ZV-W', of No.19 Operational Training Unit, out of Forres, on the Moray coast, a satellite of RAF Kinloss crashes on Meallan Odhar near Loch Pattack. Fire in the port wing caused structural failure, the wing coming down a half mile from the main wreckage. "At the request of the investigating officer the port engine was excavated from the crash site and sent to Rolls-Royce who examined it. They said that there been a failure of one of the pistons with hot gases passing beyond the piston rings of that piston which caused the gudgeon pin to fail and the connecting rod to break away which then broke through the crank case. This allowed a fuel/air mixture as well as engine oil to escape under pressure into the nacelle where it ignited and in less than one minute caused the failure of the forward wing spar and lower skin of the port wing." Five crew killed. They were: Sgt. Dennys Cyril Hunt, pilot; Sgt. Edwin Albert Deacon, navigator; Flt. Sgt. Donald James Gillies RCAF, bomb aimer; Sgt. Robert Norman Cowie, wireless operator / air gunner; and Sgt. Keith Pratt Gemmel, RCAF, air gunner.

4 July
RAF Consolidated LB-30 Liberator II, AL523, crashes on takeoff from RAF North Front, Gibraltar, killing the exiled Polish Prime Minister General Władysław Sikorski, together with his daughter, his Chief of Staff, Tadeusz Klimecki, and seven others. The flight departed at 2307 hrs., coming down in the sea after only 16 seconds of flight. Only the pilot, Eduard Prchal (1911–1984), survives. "This crash is shrouded in mystery and intrigue. Throughout World War II Sikorski tried to organize the Polish Army and constantly negotiated with Churchill and Roosevelt to circumvent any appeasement deals between the Allies, Russia, and Germany which would come at Poland's expense. By this time, the Free Poles had found out about the Katyn Massacre, and thus terminated relations with the Soviet Union on 26 April 1943. As Sikorski was the most prestigious leader of the Polish exiles, his death was a severe setback to the Polish cause, and was certainly highly convenient for Stalin. It was in some ways also convenient for the western Allies, who were finding the Polish issue a stumbling-block in their efforts to preserve good relations with Stalin. This has given rise to persistent suggestions that Sikorski's death was not accidental. This has never been proved."

4 July
The prototype Platt-LePage XR-1 helicopter, 41-001, tested at Wright Field, Ohio, by the Rotary Branch of the Air Technical Service Command from May 1943, is damaged this date by the failure of a rotor blade spinner. Never ordered into production, its last flight will take place on 21 June 1946 with 91 hours, 45 minutes of flight time, and it will be donated the National Air Museum in Washington, D.C., where it remains in storage at the Paul Garber Facility at Silver Hill, Maryland.

21 July
Captain Roberto Roque and his mechanic Fernando Cubas, of the Cuban Army Aviation Corps, suffer a fatal crash in Vultee BT-13, 72, when they come out of a dive and strike a huge tree at Güines.

31 July
The first prototype Focke-Wulf Ta 154 V1, TE+FE, powered by Jumo 211R engines, first flown 1 July 1943, tested at Rechlin, is written off in a landing accident this date when the landing gear collapsed. This was a recurrent problem that accounted for the loss of several of the type.

31 July
A Consolidated B-24E-20-CF Liberator, 41-29052, c/n 44, of the 579th Bombardment Squadron, 392d Bombardment Group, operating out of Topeka Army Air Base, en route to Duluth, Minnesota, on a navigation training flight, crashed 10 miles SW of Boone, (N 41° 57.1081', W 93° 58.) after losing part of starboard wing in a thunderstorm.

Killed were:
1st Lt. Melvin S. Meeker, Pilot
2nd Lt. Samuel Levitt, Copilot
2nd Lt. Mathew J. Radosvich, Bombardier
T/Sgt. James M. Parker, Engineer
T/Sgt. Thomas J. Leyshon, Radioman

A memorial marker was erected by the landowner, who has also preserved the three impact craters from the crash.

1 August
During a demonstration flight of an "all St. Louis-built glider", a WACO CG-4A-RO, 42-78839, built by sub-contractor Robertson Aircraft Corporation, the aircraft lost its starboard wing due to a defective wing strut support, plummets vertically to the ground at Lambert Field, St. Louis, Missouri, killing all on board, including St. Louis Mayor William D. Becker, Maj. William B. Robertson and Harold Krueger, both of Robertson Aircraft, Thomas Dysart, president of the St. Louis Chamber of Commerce, Max Doyne, director of public utilities, Charles Cunningham, department comptroller, Henry Mueller, St. Louis Court presiding judge, Lt. Col. Paul Hazleton, pilot Capt. Milton C. Klugh, and co-pilot/mechanic PFC Jack W. Davis, of the USAAF 71st Troop Carrier Squadron. The failed component had been manufactured by Robertson subcontractor Gardner Metal Products Company, of St. Louis, who, coincidentally, had been a casket maker. The War Department announces on 11 August that a summary of conclusions by three air forces investigating groups "indicated 'that faulty manufacture by a sub-contractor, faulty inspection by the prime manufacturer, and inadequate enforcement of inspection procedures, combined to produce a fatal hidden defect in a wing strut metal fitting.' The glider which crashed Aug. 1 was manufactured by Robertson Aircraft Corp., the Army said, and approximately 100 craft were grounded Aug. 4."

1 August
A Boeing B-17F-95-BO Flying Fortress, 42-30326, c/n 5440, of the 541st Bomb Squadron, 383d Bomb Group, piloted by Roy J. Lee, was headed north up the Oregon coast on a routine patrol flight. The plane had left Pendleton Field, near Pendleton, Oregon, at 0900 and was tasked with flying to Cape Disappointment on the Oregon coast. They were then to fly 500 miles out to sea, followed by a direct flight back to Pendleton Field. On arriving at the coast, the crew found the entire area hidden in overcast clouds which extended to an elevation of 8000 feet. The pilot decided to locate Cape Disappointment by flying below the overcast. The overcast proved to reach almost to the level of the sea. The plane was flying at about 50–150 feet above the waves. Deciding that the risk was too great the crew began to climb back up into the overcast. Unfortunately, the plane crashed into the side of Cape Lookout at about 900 feet in elevation. The Aviation Archeological Investigation & Research website lists the crash date as 2 August.

2 August
"Phoenix, Arizona, August 2 (UP) – Second Lt. Arthur C. Collins, 22, and Aviation Cadet Wayne B. Bowers, 22, were killed today when their twin engine training plane crashed 10 miles west of Chandler, Ariz." They went down in Lockheed RP-322 Lightning, AF162, of the 535th Twin Engine Flying Training Squadron, Williams Field, Arizona. One source gives the accident date as 1 August, and gives the location as eight miles W of Chandler. P-322s were non-turbocharged Lightning Is, originally ordered by France, the order being taken over by the Royal Air Force (hence, the RAF AF162 serial), but only three were actually retained by Great Britain, the rest being used as trainers by the U.S. Army Air Force.

2 August
Boeing B-17E Flying Fortress, 41-2463, "Yankee Doodle", of the 19th Bomb Group, then to 394th Bomb Squadron, 5th Bomb Group, crashes on takeoff due mechanical failure at Espiritu Santo, New Hebrides, Bombardier Sgt. John P. Kruger and navigator Lt. Talbert H. Woolam are killed. Pilot was Gene Roddenberry, future creator of Star Trek. The airframe was stricken on 13 August 1943.

4 August
North American XB-28A-NA, 40-3058, c/n 67-3417, crashes into the Pacific Ocean off California after the crew bails out. Project not proceeded with.

5 August
Lockheed B-34, 41-38116, that collided with American Airlines Flight 28 on 23 October 1942, was repaired and re-designated as an RB-34A-4 target tug. On 5 August 1943, this same aircraft suffered starboard engine failure during a ferry flight and crashed into Wolf Hill, a mile W of Farnum Pike, near Smithfield, Rhode Island, killing all three crew members. "The pilot having insufficient altitude to recover properly, crashed on a wooded hill," states the accident investigation report, issued 19 August 1943. Killed are 2d Lt. Otis R. Portewig, 27, Richmond, Virginia, pilot, of the 1st Towing Squadron, Otis Field, Massachusetts; T/Sgt. Herbert D. Booth, 21, Rahway, New Jersey, crew chief. also of the 1st Towing Squadron; and 2d Lt. Saul Winsten, 25, Pawtucket, Rhode Island, of the 901st Quartermaster Company, Aviation Service, Otis Field, passenger.

5 August
"Las Vegas, Nev., Aug. 6, (AP) – Four fliers attached to the Las Vegas Army Air field were killed yesterday as their plane crashed eight miles northwest of here, base officials announced. The plane, a navigator trainer, was on a routine flight when it went into a spin from 3,000 feet. It burst into flames as it struck the ground." Lockheed AT-18A-LO Hudson, 42-55494, c/n 414-7216, of the 50th Flexible Gunnery Training Squadron, Las Vegas Army Airfield, piloted by Avalon L. Finlayson, was destroyed. The Aviation Archaelological Investigation and Research website lists the crash location as 10 miles WSW of the air base.

8 August or 11 August
Future ETO double ace Captain Walker Melville "Bud" Mahurin gets off to an ignominious start this date when, "On a training mission over England he had spotted a B-24 Liberator – at the time not a particularly common aeroplane in English skies. While flying formation with the bomber he took his Thunderbolt (41-6334) a little too close resulting in the empennage being slashed off by the Liberator's propellers. Mahurin came down by parachute, his P-47 disintegrated in an English field and the Liberator made a successful landing having sustained only minor damage. Thunderbolts, costing $104,258 each, were still in short supply and Mahurin's folly did not endear him to the authorities." The P-47C-5-RE, of the 63d Fighter Squadron, 56th Fighter Group, impacted ~one mile NW of Metfield, Suffolk. Mahurin will somewhat redeem himself on 17 August 1943 when he downs two Focke-Wulf Fw 190s. The 11 August date may be the date that the airframe was officially written off.

8 August
"WENDOVER, Utah, Aug. 9 (AP) – Crashing in the night on western Utah's dreary salt desert, a four-engined Army bomber killed one flier and caused the wreck of a freight train leaving 26 boxcars stacked up like splintered toys on the Western Pacific railroad's main line today." Consolidated RB-24E Liberator, 42-7159, c/n 183, built as a B-24E-15-FO, and redesignated in the Restricted category, of the 605th Bomb Squadron, 399th Bomb Group, Wendover Field, piloted by Herbert Williams, Jr., experienced engine failure and "smashed down on highway U.S. 40-50, slithered at terrific speed across the salt crust before hitting the rails and winding up 100 feet on the opposite side. The westbound freight, powered by a double Diesel locomotive, roared along 10 to 15 minutes later and plowed into scattered wreckage and a spread rail. The engine stuck to the rails, three freight cars were derailed but stayed intact, then 26 more crashed together in a dizzy pyramid of destruction. Second Lt. Richard L. Blue of Rantoul, Ill., the plane's co-pilot, died today at the hospital at Wendover field, where the plane was based. Ten other fliers were dragged injured from the wreckage and some were critical. One rail official estimated damage to train and freight at $200,000." The train engineer, Otto Kelly, of Salt Lake City, said that the crew was unaware of the bomber's crash until after the derailment, which occurred as the last set of trucks of the motive power passed over wreckage on the right-of-way. Some 200 feet of railroad was torn up in the accident, which occurred seven miles E of Wendover. "The fliers crawled from the battered bomber and were aided by the trainmen." The bomber did not burn. The locomotives powering the freight were an EMD FTA-FTB semi-permanently coupled pair.

8 August
"Spokane, Wash., Aug. 8 (UP) – Second Lt. George F. Morris, 28, of San Pedro, California, was killed instantly when the small observation plane he was flying crashed at the seven-mile gunnery range, Geiger field officers announced today."

10 August
"Pearl Harbor, Aug. 10, (AP) – A Navy bomber crashed in the Pearl Harbor Navy yard during maneuvers today, killing three of its crew and injuring 17 persons, among them four civilian employes." The aircraft struck a loaded bus and eight civilians died, in addition to the three plane crew.

13 August
Naval Auxiliary Air Facility Lompoc, California, is commissioned as a blimp base on 8 August 1943. Five days later, as ground crews manoeuver ship K-29 in the damp, foggy morning for launch from Circle #2, the blimp's tail pendants approach a high-voltage power line and 11,000 volts arcs through the ship. Four men holding the metal handling bars on the control car are electrocuted and a fifth is seriously burned. The power company was supposed to have moved this hazard but had not. These were the only fatalities at the Lompoc facility during both civilian and military use.

14 August
Curtiss XP-60E-CU, 42-79425, is damaged in a forced landing just before being released to the USAAF for official trials. Becomes XP-60C when it is retrofit with wings, landing gear, and other items from the Curtiss XP-60A-CU, 42-79423. Meanwhile, original Curtiss XP-60C-CU, 42-79424, becomes second XP-60E with removal of 2,000 hp (1,500 kW) R-2800-53 engine and contraprops, replaced with R-2800-10 engine and four-blade prop. Whole P-60 project is essentially a dead-end, being nothing more than Curtiss' attempt to stretch pre-war design that started out as the P-36, and the company's unwillingness or inability to start fresh with a new fighter design will force them out of the airframe business a few years after the war.

16 August
Fleet Air Arm Grumman Avenger I, (TBF-1c), FN762, of 738 Squadron, out of Naval Auxiliary Air Facility Lewiston, Maine, ditches in Sebago Lake near Raymond, Maine and sinks. Crew uninjured. Plane listed as missing, so it is still out there.

18 August
Following a Royal Air Force raid on the test facilities at Peenemünde on 17 August, the Messerschmitt Me 163B Komets of training unit EK 16 are moved to a new airfield at Anklam. The airframes are towed to the new location, with one Komet, ferried by test pilot Paul Rudolf Opitz, suffering malfunctioning flap hydraulics. After casting-off from the tow plane, the rocket fighter's landing skid fails to function, the airframe decelerates over a patch of rough and rutted ground at the end of the landing run following an otherwise normal approach. Pilot suffers two damaged vertebrae due to hard landing, spends three months in hospital. Investigation reveals that a force of 15 to 30Gs were required to cause this injury, and Me 163Bs are subsequently fitted with a torsion sprung seat for the pilot, eliminating this type of injury.

23 August
"Madison, Wis., Aug. 24 [Special] – Lt. Harold Nicholson, 25 years old, son of Mr. and Mrs. Jens Nicholson of Madison, was killed last night in a plane crash near Oroville, Cal., the parents were informed today by the war department." Harold J. Nicholson was killed in the crash of Bell P-39Q-1-BE Airacobra, 42-19593, of the 363d Fighter Squadron, 357th Fighter Group, two miles N of Oroville Army Air Field.

29 August
The Thirteenth Naval District public relations office confirms on 4 September the probable death of five Navy men from Naval Air Station Whidbey Island, Washington, whose aircraft went missing on 29 August. Lockheed PV-1 Ventura, BuNo 34637, of VB-146, crashed on Mount Baker, Washington, but wreckage only discovered by a hiker in October 1997. There were actually six crew on board, all fatal.

31 August
Boeing B-17F-50-BO Flying Fortress, 42-5451, of the 582d Bomb Squadron, 393d Bomb Group, piloted by James A. McRaven, crashed two miles NE of Kearney Army Air Field, Nebraska, during a routine training flight, killing all eight crew. Among the dead were Leonard Supulski, 23, former football player for the Philadelphia Eagles. The 393d was reassigned to Kearney AAF from Sioux City AAB, Iowa, this date.

1 September
"Great Falls, Mont., Sept. 2. (AP) – Ten crew members of a four-engined bomber from the Great Falls army air base, killed early today when the ship crashed five miles east of Fort Benton, were identified tonight by Capt. John R. Lloyd, base public relations officer, as follows: Sergeant Robert H. Hall, Coldwater, Mich.; Sergeant John T. Huff, Cherokee, Kan.; Sergeant Carl E. Lower, Van Wert, Ohio; Sergeant Chester W. Peko, Throop, Pa.; Private First Class Paul Peterson, Colfax, Wis.; Sergeant Curio C. Thrementi, Vassar, Mich.; Lieutenant Harold L. Wonders, Waterloo, Iowa; Lieutenant Warren H. Maginn, Glendale, Los Angeles; Lieutenant Jack Y. Fisk, Los Angeles, and Lieutenant Arnold J. Gardiner, New York. The crash occurred during a routine training flight." Boeing B-17F-35-BO Flying Fortress, 42-5128, of the 612th Bomb Squadron, 401st Bomb Group, was flown by Lt. Maginn.

2 September
"Sioux City, Iowa, Sept. 3. (AP) – All 10 crew members of an army bomber from the Sioux City air base were killed when their plane crashed five miles from the base last night while on a routine training flight. The dead included Second Lieutenant Earl G. Adkinson, Portland, Ore., and Sergeant Robert Hunter, Eufaula, Okla." Consolidated B-24E-25-FO Liberator, 42-7237, c/n 261, of the 703d Bomb Squadron, 445th Bomb Group, flown by Lt. "Atkinson", according to the crash report, crashed one mile E of the base.

2 September
Boeing B-17F-40-VE Flying Fortress, 42-5977, of the 540th Bomb Squadron (Heavy), 383d Bomb Group (Heavy), Geiger Field, Washington, on a routine local flight with three aboard, piloted by Robert P. Ferguson, clips the tops of trees for several blocks, crashes into scrub pines two miles S of Geiger Field and burns. Only three were on the bomber, said a report by Lt. R. E. Reed, public relations officer at the field. Names were withheld pending notification of next of kin.

3 September
A U.S. Navy ensign is killed when his plane dives into a peat bog near Redmond, Washington, this date, the Thirteenth Naval District public relations office confirms on 4 September.

4 September
All eight crew of Consolidated B-24E-25-CF Liberator, 41-29071, of the 701st Bomb Squadron, 445th Bomb Group, Sioux City Army Air Base, Iowa, piloted by Jack D. Hodges, are killed when the bomber crashes in a corn field four miles SW of Moville, Iowa.

4 September
"Norfolk, Virginia, September 4 (AP) – Three navy men were killed and a small Negro boy was fatally burned when a navy land plane crashed late Friday near Manteo, North Carolina, the 5th naval district announced today. A second boy was burned."

5 September
"Ellensburg, Washington, September 5 (AP) – During a training mission in an unidentified Naval aircraft, Lieut. (J.G.) William Henry Leder was killed when the plane he was flying caught fire midair and crashed just short of the airfield. The pilot of another Navy plane, Ensign Joseph Hamilton, 23, of Iowa City, Iowa, also crashed but escaped with minor injuries. Hamilton had "dived" the field in an attempt to alert crews on the ground to Leder's condition when his plane also developed trouble. Not much is known about the aircraft or what maneuvers were being conducted. Leder had been stationed at Bowers Field as a test pilot and flight instructor after being awarded the Air Medal for combat in the Pacific."

9 September
A Reggiane Re.2000, launched from the Italian battleship Vittorio Veneto to look for survivors of the sunk Italian battleship Roma, subsequently crashes when it tries to land near Ajaccio airfield, Corsica.

9 September
During carrier compatibility trials, test pilot Capt. Eric "Winkle" Brown crashlands Fairey Firefly F Mk.I, Z1844, on the deck of HMS Pretoria Castle when arrestor hook indicator light falsely shows "down" position. Fighter hits crash barrier, shears off its landing gear, shreds propeller, but pilot unhurt.

11 September
North American B-25G Mitchell, misreported as 41-13240, a serial belonging to a Curtiss P-40C, of the 472d Bomb Squadron, 334th Bomb Group, Greenville Army Air Base, South Carolina, piloted by Eugene E. Stocking, collides four miles NW of Spartanburg, South Carolina, with B-25G-5 42-65013, of the same units, flown by Solon E. Ellis. 65013 crashes, killing five crew, while the unidentified Mitchell lands safely.

11 September
The prototype Airborne and General MC-1, NX21757, prototype of the XCG-16, begins tests at March Field, California, but on the second flight, inadequately secured ballast comes loose when the glider flies through the Lockheed C-60 glider tug's propwash, causing a catastrophic rearward shift in the centre of gravity. The uncontrollable MC-1A releases from tow and enters a flat spin at 3,000 feet (910 m), from which it does not recover, and crashes in a plowed field. Three of the crew and passengers bail out but only two survive the parachute jump. Paul G. Wells and Harry M. Pearl descend safely, but the parachute of Richard Chichester du Pont, 37, who won the national soaring championship five years in a row, serving as special assistant to Gen. Henry "Hap" Arnold, does not open in time and he is killed. Also killed in the wreck are Col. P. Ernest Gabel, another glider specialist, deputy director of the Army Air Forces glider program, on the staff of the Chief of Staff of the Air Force, Washington, D.C., C. C. Chandler, Tarzana, California, test pilot and thrice soaring champion, and test pilot Howard L. Morrison, San Fernando, California.

12 September
A U.S. Navy Grumman F4F Wildcat flown by Lieutenant John Lewis Morelle, USNR, 24, of Georgetown, Texas, strikes a suspension cable of the San Francisco–Oakland Bay Bridge. The wings and tail were sheared off and the plane fell burning into the bay 200 feet below. The pilot's body is not recovered. Portions of the wings and tail assembly rained down onto the roadway but no civilian was injured despite many vehicles on the span at the time. Six of seven strands of one suspension cable were snapped, but the safety of the bridge was not endangered. This was the first time a plane hit the span since its 12 November 1936 opening.

26 September
A Vought OS2U-3 Kingfisher, BuNo 5767, of VS-34, from Naval Air Station New York, Floyd Bennett Field, crashes 7 miles S of Little Egg Inlet, near Atlantic City, New Jersey. Two survivors, pilot William K. Stevens, and radio operator-gunner Frank W. Talley, are picked up by Coast Guard 83-foot Wooden Patrol Boat WPB-83340.

29 September
A Douglas C-53D-DO Skytrooper, 42-68788, of the 93d Troop Carrier Squadron, 439th Troop Carrier Group, departs Alliance Army Airfield, Alliance, Nebraska, on a night training mission to practice communication with the Scottsbluff Radio Range, but crashes three miles S of the base for unknown reasons shortly thereafter, killing both crew. Heavy fog hindered the search from the air, however, a rancher found the wreckage while checking his stock. KWF were 2d Lt. William Cardie, pilot, of Plainfield, New Jersey, and 2d Lt. Robert G. Bartels, co-pilot, of Blasdell, New York. The left wing had struck the ground.

2 October
Second prototype Arado Ar 234 V2 crashes at Rheine, near Münster, after suffering fire in port wing, failure of both engines, and various instrumentation failure, the airframe diving into the ground from 4,000 feet (1,200 m), killing pilot Flugkapitän Selle.

8 October
First (of two) Northrop XP-56 tailless flying wing fighters, 42-1786, suffers blown left main tire during ~130 mph (210 km/h) taxi across Muroc Dry Lake, Muroc Air Base, California. Aircraft tumbles, goes airborne, throws pilot John Myers clear before crashing inverted, airframe destroyed. Pilot, wearing a polo helmet for protection, suffers only minor injuries.

20 October

A Consolidated Liberator III from No. 10 Squadron RCAF, on a routine flight from Gander, Newfoundland and Labrador to Mont-Joli, Québec flew into a mountain near Saint-Donat, Lanaudière, Quebec due to inclement weather and a mapping error. All those on board perished in the incident and it took more than two years to find the location of the wreckage.

24 October
Curtiss SB2C Helldiver, of VB-8, coded '8-B-24', suffers major damage in a barrier crash aboard USS Intrepid during shakedown cruise in the Caribbean, engine breaking loose from mounts and dropping down towards the deck adjacent to the island.

25 October
Four Consolidated B-24H Liberators of the 724th Bomb Squadron (Heavy), 451st Bomb Group (Heavy), from Fairmont Army Air Field, Nebraska, were flying in a diamond formation. At 1600 hrs. CWT, one bomber broke formation and the pilot of a second, as trained, moved toward the vacated position. When the first bomber returned to its position, the two planes collided. At an altitude of 20,000 feet, this was the highest fatal World War II training accident in Nebraska. One bomber crashed in the adjoining farm fields of Frank Hromadka Sr. and Anna Matejka, 2 miles N and ½ mile E of Milligan, Nebraska. The other crashed in the farmyard of Mike and Fred Stech, 3 miles N and 2 miles E of Milligan. Killed were 2d Lt. James H. Williams, 2d Lt. William E. Herzog, 2d Lt. Kenneth S. Ordway, 2d Lt. Charles L. Brown, 2d Lt. Clyde H. Frye, Sgt. James H. Bobbitt, Sgt. William D. Watkins, Sgt. William G. Williams, Sgt. Wilbur H. Chamberlin, Sgt. Edward O. Boucher, Sgt. Ursulo Galindo Jr., Sgt. William C. Wilson, Sgt. Albert R. Mogavero, Sgt. Arthur O. Doria, Sgt. Eugene A. Hubbell, F/O Achille P. Augelli, and Pfc. Andrew G. Bivona. All eight crew died aboard B-24H-1-FO, 42-7657, piloted by 2d Lt. Brown, while the sole survivor of ten on B-24H-1-FO, 42-7673, flown by 2d Lt. Williams, was 2d Lt. Melvin Klein, who was thrown free of the wreckage and managed to deploy his parachute. A Nebraska historical marker was erected about the accident in 2010 by the Milligan Memorial Committee for the World War II Fatal Air Crashes near Milligan, Nebraska.

30 October
U.S. Navy Goodyear ZNP-K airship K-94, BuNo 33486, probably assigned at Naval Air Station Richmond, Florida, on a ferry trip from Guantanamo, Cuba, to San Juan, Puerto Rico, is lost. After the 13th hourly position report at 2200, nothing more is heard from the flight and it disappears abruptly from the shore radar-tracking screen. Eyewitnesses on surface craft report seeing a small flaming object similar to a flare dropping from the airship. Almost immediately afterward, a bright colored flame was noticed, increasing in size until the entire airship was engulfed in flames on its descent into the Caribbean Sea. Eight crew lost. A B-25G-10 Mitchell, 42-65118, of the 417th Bomb Squadron, 25th Bomb Group, piloted by Jaspar J. Kraynick, searching for survivors of K-94, also disappears ~3.5 hours later at approximately the same position, 15 miles NW of Borinquen Field.

8 November
Boeing B-17F-75-DL Flying Fortress 42-3553, c/n 8489, 'QJ-H', "Sad Sack", of the 339th Bomb Squadron, 96th Bomb Group, crashes at Middle Farm, West Harling, Norfolk, United Kingdom shortly after taking off from RAF Snetterton Heath with the loss of all ten crew.

10 November
Boeing B-17G-15-DL Flying Fortress, 42-37831, c/n 8517, suffered a hydraulics and brakes failure at RAF Snetterton Heath and was written off.

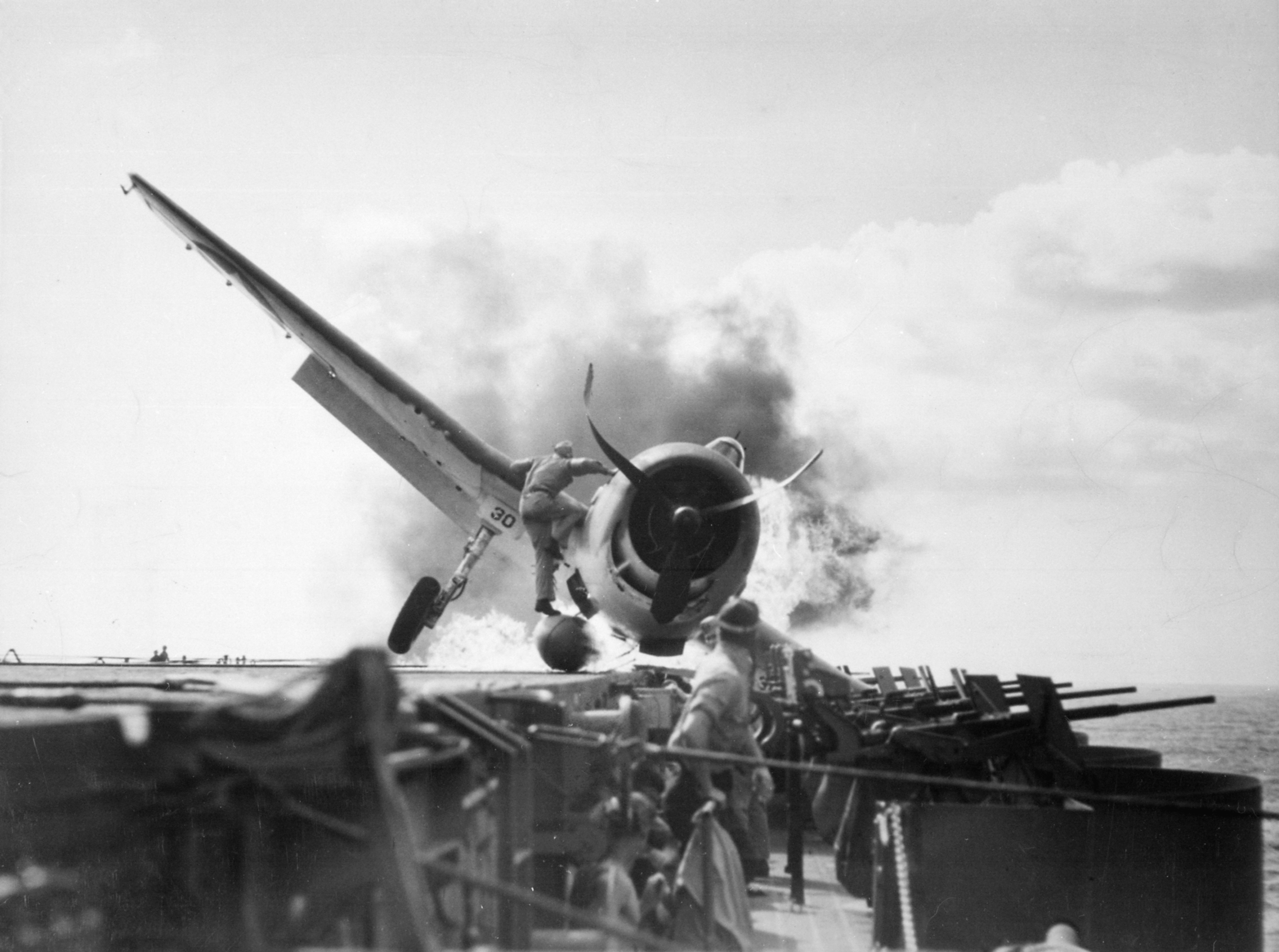
Lt. Walter L. Chewning effecting pilot rescue aboard USS Enterprise, 10 November 1943.

10 November
U.S. Navy Grumman F6F-3 Hellcat, BuNo 25974, '30', of VF-2, on a routine training exercise off of USS Enterprise en route to Makin Atoll, piloted by Ensign (later Lieutenant) Byron Milton Johnson of Potter, Nebraska, suffers engine problems, makes emergency landing, catches 3 wire on his third attempt, slams into deck and ends up with port landing gear leg in the port catwalk near 20 mm (.78 caliber) Oerlikon anti-aircraft guns. Airframe rests on belly tank, which begins to leak, propeller blades turning against deck edge emit sparks which set fuel alight. Hard landing jams canopy, retaining pin sheared. One of the Pacific war's iconic images is caught as Lieutenant (later Lieutenant Commander) Walter Lewis Chewning of Cynwyd, Pennsylvania, Enterprise new catapult officer, rescues Johnson, stepping on the burning tank to reach the cockpit. While waiting for '30' to be cleared from the deck, Ensign S. S. Osbourne in F6F-3, BuNo 25985, has to ditch. USS Brown picks Osbourne up. Both Hellcats written off. "Chewning was awarded the Navy and Marine Corps Medal for his actions. The commander of VF-2's Air Group, famed fighter pilot Edward "Butch" O'Hare (1914–1943) recommended that night that all pilots drop their external tank before landing to prevent such an accident repeating."

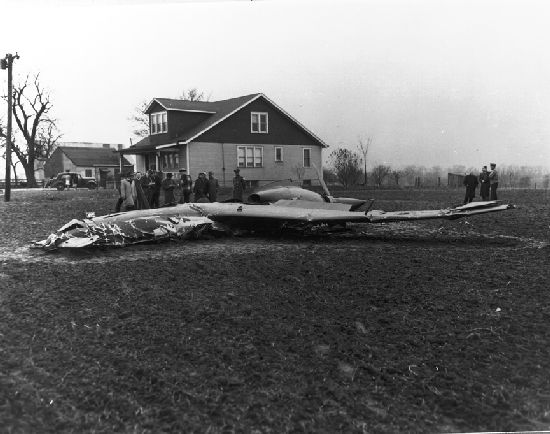
The first XP-55 lies inverted following a crash during flight testing.

15 November
First of three prototypes of the Curtiss XP-55 Ascender, 42-78845, on test flight out of Lambert Field, St. Louis, Missouri, crashes when pilot is unable to recover from a stall, engine then quits, Curtiss test pilot J. Harvey Gray divorces airframe after 16,000-foot (4,900 m) plummet, landing safely, fighter impacts inverted in an open field.

21 November

1943 Douglas C-47 crash
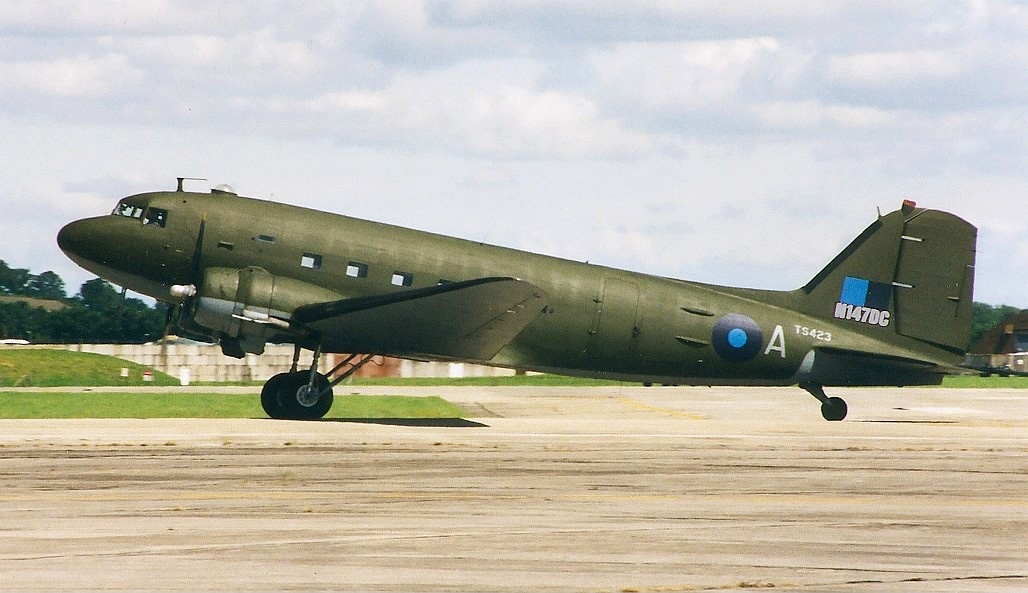
- A Douglas C-47A similar to the accident aircraft

Accident
- Date: 21 November 1943
- Summary: CFIT (controlled flight into terrain)
- Site: Locust Mountain, Mahanoy Township, Pennsylvania

Aircraft
- Aircraft type: Douglas C-47A
- Operator: United States Army Air Forces
- Registration: 42-32929
- Flight origin: Lawson Army Airfield
- Destination: Naval Air Station Joint Reserve Base Willow Grove
- Passengers: 5
- Crew: 4
- Fatalities: 7
- Injuries: 2
- Survivors: 2

On 21 November 1943, a Douglas C-47 aircraft crashed into Locust Mountain in Mahanoy Township, Pennsylvania. Seven of the occupants on board the aircraft were killed, and two survived with serious injuries.

On the night of 21 November 1943, three Douglas C-47A aircraft took off from Lawson Field in Fort Benning, Georgia. They were heading to Naval Air Station Willow Grove in Horsham Township, Pennsylvania, to pick up CG-4A gliders and tow them to Maxton AAF. At the time, Maxton was the site of the largest CG-4A glider pilot training base in the world.

In the airspace around Washington, DC the three aircraft entered a large storm front and lost visual contact with one another. Captain Bernard Cederholm, the pilot of 42-32929, decided to divert to the now-abandoned Barnsville Auxiliary Airfield near Allentown, Pennsylvania. Due to weather circumstances and low visibility, Cederholm failed to locate the airfield. He was following a holding circuit when the aircraft hit trees on Locust Mountain, located approximately an eighth of a mile west of Tamaqua, Pennsylvania at 2110 EST, and broke up. A fire broke out on impact, and seven of the nine aboard were killed. The two survivors left were Corporal Joseph W. Enloe and Private Charles H. Davis, who were found wandering around the site of the crash a half hour afterwards. The force of the crash was so powerful that it is reported that the tail was thrown approximately 1,500 feet away from the impact site.

The aircraft, a Douglas C-47A with the tail number 42-32929 was first flown in 1943. n In total, seven of the nine occupants onboard 42-32929 were killed in the resulting crash:

The cause of the crash was never fully determined, although it is believed to be a case of CFIT (controlled flight into terrain).

22 November
On November 22, 1943 a 32nd TCS C-47A aircraft flown by Capt. Richard B. Ott, the squadron Executive Officer, 2nd Lt. Ceasar Gonzales, along with Assistant Crew Chief Truman A. Scott, crashed in an attempted landing at Castelvetrano. Bad fog covered half the field at the time of the crash. The aircraft was approaching the field from the south, apparently 90 degrees away from the runway heading, with landing gear still up. Several miles from the end of the runway the plane banked to the right and the wing hit a telephone pole breaking it off about 5 feet above the ground. The plane also hit an Italian cart, killing the occupants immediately. The left wing then struck the highway a hundred feet further ahead and the wing broke off. Debris from the crash was strewn across the entire area, with the fuselage coming to rest at the brow of a hill on the extreme south end of the field. All the crew on that aircraft died instantly and there was also a fire caused by the fuel spillage. The group held funeral services for all the men the next day at the U.S. Military Cemetery on the outskirts of Palermo.
Night of 23–24 November
The Deutsche Luftfahrt Sammlung (Berlin Air Museum), at Lehrter Bahnhof, is destroyed in an RAF bombing raid by 383 aircraft:365 Avro Lancaster, 10 Handley Page Halifax, and 8 de Havilland Mosquito bombers. Many exhibited aircraft are destroyed, including the Dornier Do-X, the last surviving example of the PZL.30 Żubr, and the Focke-Wulf Cierva C.19a demonstrator, Wrke Nr. 35, D-1960 / D-OBIR. Surviving types are moved E from Berlin where they are discovered post-war. Most of these survivors are now in the Muzeum Lotnictwa Polskiego w Krakowie, the Polish Aviation Museum, at Kraków, Poland.

6 December
USAAF Douglas A-20G-20-DO Havoc, 42-86782, of the 649th Bomb Squadron, 411th Bombardment Group (Light), out of Florence Army Airfield, South Carolina, crashed near Woodruff, Spartanburg County, South Carolina, three miles E of Switzer. Pilot 2nd Lt. Hampton P. Worrell, 26, (b. 1917 in South Carolina), gunners Sgt. Harry G. Barnes, 19, (b. 1924 in New York) and Sgt. John D. Hickman, 21, (b. 1923 in California), all killed.

7 December
During a joint U.S. Navy–U.S. Marine simulated close air support exercise near Pauwela, Maui, Territory of Hawaii, the pilot of a U.S. Navy Douglas SBD-5 Dauntless, BuNo 36045 of squadron VB-10, initiates a slight right-hand turn and deploys dive brakes in preparation for a bomb run, but his aircraft is struck by a second VB-10 SBD-5, 36099, that did not have dive brakes deployed. Both aircraft crash, and a bomb knocked loose from 36045 falls in the midst of a group of marines and detonates, killing 20 and seriously injuring 24. Both SBD pilots parachute to safety, but both SBD gunners die, one after an unsuccessful bailout attempt. The collision is attributed to poor judgment and flying technique by both pilots. Aviation Archaeology Investigation & Research gives the date of this accident as 6 December.

9 December
Boeing B-17G-20-BO Flying Fortress, 42-31468, "The Galley Uncle", force landed during ferry flight from Gander in a field adjacent to Graan Monastery, near Enniskillen, County Fermanagh, Northern Ireland. One crew died and five were saved by local monks.

22 December
Lt. Col. William Edwin Dyess (1916–1943) is killed when the Lockheed P-38G-10-LO Lightning, 42-13441, of the 337th Fighter Squadron, 329d Fighter Group, he is undergoing retraining in catches fire in flight near Burbank, California. He refuses to bail out over a populated area and dies when his Lightning impacts in a vacant lot at 109 Myers St, Burbank, saving countless civilians on the ground. Dyess had been captured on Bataan in April 1942 by the Japanese, but escaped in April 1943 and fought with guerilla forces on Mindanao until evacuated by the submarine USS Trout in July 1943. Abilene Air Force Base, Texas, is named for him on 1 December 1956.

29 December
1st Lt Robert L. Duke is killed in the crash of Curtiss A-25A-20-CS Shrike, 42-79823, near Spencer, Tennessee, this date. He was assigned as Assistant A-3 of Eglin Field, Florida. Eglin Auxiliary Field 3 is later named Duke Field in his honor.

Boeing B-17G-15-VE Flying Fortress, 42-97493 of the 2nd Ferrying Group out of Dover Army Airfield, crashes 2 miles SW of Gander shortly after takeoff, 29 December 1943. Witness, a F/O Fisher, reporter that the Boeing bomber banked very sharply to the left, more in the style of a single-engined aircraft than a four-engined bomber.
KWF was pilot, 1LT Bruce E. Ryan of Short Hills, NJ,
2nd Lt Stephen A. Wooten, pilot,
2nd Lt John J. Gentile, navigator,
Sgt Charles Thayer, flight engineer,
Cpl Frederick A. Norton, radio operator,
2nd Lt Ballard D. McCain, pilot,
2nd Lt Paul J. Lineham, navigator,
S/Sgt Thomas R. Killela, flight engineer,
Sgt Howard W. Nightower, radio operator,
Sgt Daniel L. Boucher, gunner. .

Aircraft was completely consumed by fire pursuant to the crash and no cause was ever determined.

30 December
Luftwaffe pilot Lt. Joschi Pöhs is killed when, upon takeoff in a Messerschmitt Me 163A of training unit EK 16 from Bad Zwischenahn, near Oldenburg, he releases the takeoff dolly too soon. The bouncing dolly strikes the airframe, apparently damaging a T-Stoff line, and the engine loses power. The pilot banks the Komet round for an attempted landing but just prior to lining up for touchdown a wingtip grazes a flak tower, all control is lost, and the rocket fighter crashes just outside the airfield perimeter. It was felt that if Pōhs had begun his turn back to the airfield immediately after the power loss he would have made a safe return; however, he lowered the landing skid and dropped flaps before beginning the turn and ate up precious altitude.

Post-December
Sole prototype of the Kawasaki Ki-64 (Allied code name: Rob), an experimental heavy, single-seat fighter with two Ha-40 engines in tandem; one in the aircraft nose, the other behind the cockpit, both being connected by a drive shaft, driving two 3-bladed, contra-rotating propellers, first flown in December 1943. During the fifth flight, the rear engine catches fire, the aircraft makes an emergency landing, but is damaged. The design is subsequently abandoned in mid-1944 in favour of more promising projects. The airframe survives the war and parts are sent to Wright Field for examination.

== 1944 ==
January
A Mitsubishi J2M2 Raiden (Thunderbolt) disintegrated over Toyohashi airfield. Cause was never satisfactorily explained but believed to have been either violent engine shaking due to failed attachment point causing secondary airframe failure, or, possibly, engine cowling detaching and striking tail assembly.

2 January
"HORNICK, Iowa, Jan. 2. (AP)—Nine crew members of a Flying Fortress based at Sioux City, were killed when the plane crashed and burned on a farm near here late today. Persons within a radius of several miles said they saw the plane explode and crash." B-17F-40-VE, 42-6013, of the 393d CCTS, piloted by Frank R. Hilford, appears to be the airframe involved.

2 January
"Sacramento, Calif., Jan. 2 (AP) – Thirteen army flyers were killed today when a B-17 Flying Fortress, headed for Los Angeles from McChord field, Tacoma, Wash., exploded in flight over McClellan field and plunged 3000 feet to the ground in flames. Thousands of Sacramentans, startled by a terrific explosion, looked skyward and saw the crippled and burning four-motored bomber emerge from the overcast sky and fall. Only one member of the plane's crew of 14 escaped the flaming wreckage, parachuting to safety before the crash. He was Maj. James H. Wergen of Kingman field, Ariz., the bomber's home base. The plane went to pieces in the air as it fell, scattering a wingtip, one of its motors and other parts over a vast area. McClellan field authorities said medical officers were attempting to identify the dead, but that names would be withheld pending notification of next of kin." The B-17G was piloted by Frederick M. Klopfenstein.

3 January
The crash of Cessna AT-17B Bobcat, 42-38897, c/n 3106, of the 986th SEFTS, Douglas Army Airfield, Arizona, kills Aviation Cadets Loris Gale, 20, of Walla Walla, Washington, and James C. Gallagher, 20, of Lima, Ohio. The twin-engined trainer came down three miles S of the Cochise Ranger Station, Arizona, said the Douglas Field public relations officer.

4 January
Boeing B-17G-10-BO Flying Fortress, 42-31257, flying in formation with other B-17s, catches fire near Alamo, Nevada, while en route between Indian Springs Army Airfield and Las Vegas Army Airfield, Nevada, and twelve of thirteen aboard bail out. One is killed when his chute fails to open in time, and one aboard the bomber dies in the crash 67 miles NNE of Las Vegas AAF. Other planes circled the spot where the plane went down and radioed the base news of the crash. "Eleven of their number were brought to the airfield hospital hospital last night (5 January), suffering from minor injuries and exposure after having spent the intervening time in heavy snow on a high mountain plateau."

4 January
A P-38 Lightning, 42-68006, of the 11th Ferrying Squadron, 5th Ferrying Group, Love Field, Dallas, Texas, piloted by 2nd Lieutenant Chester R. Gunkel of Milwaukee, Wisconsin, crashes into Bald Rock at Cheaha State Park in Alabama, killing Gunkel. The plane was en route from Love Field to Atlanta, Georgia. One of the machine guns from the crash was recovered the next day. In 2023, the machine gun was donated to the Cheaha State Park museum.

5 January
A P-47B Thunderbolt, 41-5920, piloted by Lt. Wesley A. Murphey Jr., crashed landed in the Green Swamp in North Carolina while on the return to Wilmington's Bluethenthal Field. This after experiencing landing gear failure and an eventual engine fire which took out the automatic prop and pitch control. The plane was en route to Fort Myers, Florida and had experienced a problem with a broken hinge on the right landing gear flap shortly after take off. Lt. Murphey was able to put the plane down in the Green Swamp coming to a stop on a marsh. With darkness closing in fast, Lt. Murphey ended up spending a cold night alone in the cockpit of the downed P-47 before eventually being rescued the next day by his fellow comrades. Even after being rescued, it took the rest of the afternoon to make it out of the swamp.

The plane has since been recovered from the swamp by an Illinois man who is in the process of restoring the rare bird. It was the thirtieth of its kind to roll off the assembly line and is considered the oldest surviving Thunderbolt in the world.

8 January
1st Lt. Andrew Biancur, a test pilot of the Medium Bombardment Section of the 1st Proving Ground Group, is killed in crash of Northrop YP-61-NO Black Widow, 41-18883, c/n 711, at Eglin Field this date. Eglin Auxiliary Field 6 is later named in his honor.

8 January
Five men are killed and two missing in the crash of Consolidated B-24J-40-CO Liberator, 42-73365, (the first block 40-CO airframe) of the 776th Bomb Squadron, 464th Bomb Group, Pocatello Army Air Field, Idaho, piloted by Lt. Richard A. Hedges, when it crashes on the grounds of the Idaho National Laboratory, 40 miles NW of the air base, during a night training mission. Lt. Col. Marshall Bonner, commandant of the base, identified the dead as: Lt. Hedges, of Circleville, Ohio; 2d Lt. Robert W. Madsen, North St. Paul, Minnesota; 2d Lt. Richard R. Pitener, Chicago; Sgt. Charles W. Eddy, San Luis Obispo, California; and Sgt. George H. Peace Jr., Canton, Connecticut. Lt. Col. Bonner said on 11 January that the bodies of the two missing crew had been found and identified. They were 2d Lt. Lonnie L. Keepers, Aransas Pass, Texas, and Sgt. Louis H. Rinke, of Lawton, West Virginia.

12 January
An American pilot, attached to the R.A.F., Wing Commander Lance C. Wade was killed in a flying accident just after takeoff from Foggia-Main Airfield, Italy, when hisAuster AOP Mk III, MT415, c/n 506, of Desert Air Force HQ, RAF, stalled and spun in. Wade was alone. Wade, from Reklaw, Texas, joined the RAF in Canada in April 1941, and is credited with 22 kills and two shared.

12 January
Consolidated B-24D-165-CO Liberator, 42-72887, c/n 2447, of Biggs Field, Texas, piloted by 2d Lt. Donald E. Hermo, makes a crash landing 30 miles N of Biggs following mechanical failure. (An Associated Press wire report gives the location as "about 35 miles north of El Paso.") Seven crew are killed and one critically injured. One announced victim is the pilot, 2d Lt. Hermo, of Parma, Idaho.

12 January
U.S. Navy Grumman F6F-3 Hellcat, BuNo 66237, c/n A-1257, 'Z 11', suffers engine failure on functional check flight out of Naval Air Station San Diego, North Island, California, pilot Ens. Robert F. Thomas ditches in the Pacific Ocean ~12 miles (19 km) from the base, gets clear of sinking airframe and survives to become an ace in the Pacific theatre. Hellcat is discovered in 3,400 feet (1,000 m) of water by the Lockheed prototype research submarine RV Deep Quest on 17 March 1970. Recovered by USN on 9 October 1970. An M-2 .50 calibre machine gun from the wing is taken to the Naval Weapons Laboratory at Dahlgren, Virginia, for test firing. Showing little signs of deterioration after the long immersion, the weapon, after cleaning and lubrication, fires without a stoppage or mechanical failure. Airframe was displayed as of 1974 at Pima County Air Museum, Tucson, Arizona, now at the National Museum of Naval Aviation, Naval Air Station Pensacola, Florida.

13 January
Boeing B-17G-30-DL Flying Fortress, 42-38094, flown by Ralph M. Calhoon, and B-17G-10-VE, 42-40038, piloted by Thomas W. Williams, of the 99th Bomb Squadron, collide ~10 miles (16 km) SW of Brooksville Army Airfield, Florida, killing four officers and five enlisted men, reports Brigadier General Hume Peabody, commander of the Army Air Forces Tactical Center (AAFTAC), at Orlando. One of the remaining seven victims is Sgt. Benjamin B. Estes.

13 January
In Astoria, Oregon, a navy pilot was killed when two navy planes on training flights collided over the ocean, near the mouth of the Columbia River. One pilot landed safely, but the other parachuted out and was last seen floating out to sea by soldiers from Fort Stevens, who were not able to ascertain if he was already dead.

14 January
Squadron Leader, B. B. Howe, 28, and Squadron Leader, R. S. Harmon, 25, of the British Royal Air Force bailed out of their disabled plane over the Ohio River about nine miles above St. Marys, West Virginia. The two were flying from Dayton, Ohio, to Bolling Field, Washington, D.C. Harmon parachuted to safety on the West Virginia side of the river while Howe, the pilot, plunged into the river and drowned. The plane crashed against a hillside on the Ohio side of the river and burned. Harmon managed to land against a hillside, but Howe apparently unable to direct his parachute plunged into the ice-filled river. He managed to break loose from his parachute harness just before he went in. He was about midway of the river and remained afloat for about 15 minutes. He was seen struggling to climb onto the ice, which was so thin it broke at his every attempt. Probably exhausted and benumbed with cold he sank and drifted under the ice while witnesses were making hasty efforts to rescue him. His body was recovered two days later about 200 feet from where he went into the river. Both men had engaged in many flights of the RAF, Harmon being credited with twenty-seven bombing raids over Germany. They had been sent to the U.S. to serve as trainers in the field. Basil B.W. Howe was buried in Arlington National Cemetery, Section 15.

15 January
Boeing B-17F-50-VE Flying Fortress, 42-6147, of the 818th Bomb Squadron (H), 483d Bomb Group (H), MacDill Field, Florida, piloted by William R. Sablotny, lost in a blizzard over the Allegheny Mountains, crashes three miles N of Rich Mountain, West Virginia, killing six of seven aboard, state police said 16 January.

15 January
North American AT-24A-NA Mitchell, 42-87531, built as a B-25D-30 and converted, of the 311th FTG, La Junta Army Airfield, La Junta, Colorado, flown by 2d Lt. Burton M. Paddock, former Portland, Oregon, policeman, crashes seven miles E of Rocky Ford Aux #1. The pilot and two California aviation cadets are killed, officials at the La Junta base said 16 January.

18 January
Douglas C-47A-60-DL Skytrain, 43-30682, of the 94th Troop Carrier Squadron, 439th Troop Carrier Group, Laurinburg–Maxton Army Air Base, South Carolina, piloted by Ralph L. Zimmerman, experiences engine failure on takeoff from Oakland Airport, and falls on an East Oakland residential area, coming down at 38th and Mare Streets, Oakland, California. All eight aboard die as the plane demolishes one house and sets two others afire. "The demolished house was that of Mr. and Mrs. Arthur E. Jacobsen, who escaped death because they were having breakfast in the only room left even reasonably intact. As the plane struck and exploded both were thrown to the floor. A neighbor, Mrs. Gwendolyn Wright, was thrown from her bed, which overturned on her. Her home partly burned but she and her 12-year-old son escaped serious injury."

21 January
Army pilot 2d Lt. Harry E. Pape, of Sacramento, California, bails out of Bell P-39Q Airacobra, 42-8862, out of Concord Army Air Base, California, moments before it crashes aboard Naval Air Station Alameda, California, within feet of Building 5. Flying debris injures ten employees in Building 5, three seriously. A Navy photo of the pilot descending under his canopy is carried by Associated Press wirephoto on 23 January. He is not injured.

22 January
Two Consolidated RB-24E Liberators of B-24 replacement training units 355th Bomb Squadron, 302d Bomb Group, Langley Field, Virginia, collide on a local flight. B-24E-25-CF (as built), 41-29075, c/n 67, flown by Howard R. Cosgrove, crashes and burns, killing all seven on board, while B-24E-25-FO (as built), 42-7420, c/n 444, piloted by Carlos N. Clayton, makes a crash landing in a swamp, none of the eight crew suffering serious injury despite the aircraft being virtually demolished.

25 January
Consolidated B-24E-25-DT Liberator, 41-28544, of the 34th Combat Crew Training Squadron, Blythe Army Airfield, California, piloted by Donald J. Harris, crashes four miles N of Quartzsite, Arizona, killing all seven aboard, Col. Dave Wade, commandant of Blythe AAF, announces on 26 January.

25 January
The U.S. Navy Pacific fleet headquarters announces on 1 February that a severe storm in the Pacific on 25 January forced down 22 of 23 Vought F4U-1D Corsairs of Marine squadron VMF-422 during a routine flight between the Gilbert and Ellice Islands, with all but six pilots rescued. "One plane reached base safely, one made a crash landing in the Ellice Islands and the other 21 came down at sea as far as is known, the Navy announcement said. The body of one pilot has been recovered and five men are listed as missing." This is considered the worst non-combat accident for a Marine Corps squadron of the war.

28 January
Col. Robin E. Epler, deputy commander (Technical) of the Air Proving Ground Command, Eglin Field, Florida, is killed this date in crash of Douglas A-20G-10-DO Havoc, 42-54016, one mile (1.6 km) NE of Crestview, Florida. Eglin Auxiliary Field No. 7 is named in his honor.

31 January
Short Stirling, EF232, of 1660 HCU, departs RAF Swinderby for a night exercise, with a crew that includes a pupil pilot and two flight engineers. The aircraft crashes at Carlton-le-Moorland at 2132 hrs., shortly after takeoff, killing all eight aboard, although some linger until the next day.

31 January
Halifax Bomber DK1851 1664 HCU crashed into high ground south of Ilkley, Yorkshire. The aircraft was approximately 40 miles off course when it flew into Ilkley Moor not far from the Swastika Stone at around 17.30hrs. All seven airmen died as a result of the crash; one of these had initially survived but died of his injuries.

1 February
Consolidated B-24J-40-CO Liberator, 42-73390, of the 605th Bomb Squadron, 399th Bomb Group, piloted by Arthur Fitzpatrick, attempting a forced night landing with engine trouble, crashes at March Field, California, killing four crew and sending six to the base hospital. Dead are Second Lt. Wesley Eugene Sory, 26, Livingston, Texas; Sgt. Samuel W. Hawthorne, 22, Morton, Texas; Second Lt. William Arthur Prange, 23, husband of Mrs. Hazel Prange of Los Angeles, and Second Lt. Fritz Barkan, Jr., 29, husband of Mrs. Elizabeth Barkan, of Riverside, California.

2 February
Six fliers are killed and two seriously injured in the crash of a Boeing B-17G-30-BO Flying Fortress, 42-31904, early this date, 2/3 mile NW of Kearney Army Air Base, Nebraska, during a training flight. Two other crew were uninjured. Was assigned to the 9th HBP Headquarters, Grand Island Army Air Field, Nebraska, and flown by Leslie A. Bond.

3 February
"MIAMI, Fla., Feb. 5 (AP) – Naval district headquarters announced today the loss of nine Navy and Marine Corps men in the crash of a plane from a high altitude into the sea seven miles east of Miami Thursday."

4 February
Boeing B-17F-90-BO Flying Fortress, 42-30188, "Temptation", with nose art of a black cat considering dropping a bomb, previously "Kats Sass II", 'MZ S' of the 413th Bomb Squadron, 96th Bomb Group, during takeoff for a Frankfort mission, suffers runaways on Nos. 1 and 2 propellers. Lt. Joseph Meacham attempts landing at near-by as yet unfinished base, but crash lands at East Shropham, Norfolk, NNW of RAF Snetterton Heath. All eleven crew survive but the aircraft is damaged beyond repair and is written off, fit only for parts salvage.

7 February
Nine Army airmen were killed when a heavy bomber crashed eight miles northeast of Wendover Air base." The aircraft was a Consolidated B-24H-15-CF Liberator, 41-29396, of the 789th Bomb Squadron, 467th Bomb Group, flown by Earl C. Bonville, involved.

7 February
Aviation Cadet Max Quillen, 21, of the U.S. Naval Air Corps, was killed in an airplane collision near Converse, Indiana about 1:30 o'clock Tuesday afternoon in a routine flight. Report made by Lieutenant Douglas Campbell, press relations officer at Bunker Hill Naval Air Station, where Cadet Quillen was stationed, said that he was alone in the plane at the time of the accident and that he was flying near the Bunker Hill station at Peru, Indiana. After entering the service, Cadet Quillen left in the Flying Redbird Squadron from Parkersburg, West Virginia in April of last year and was only recently transferred to Indiana for advanced training.

8 February
"FORT WAYNE, Ind., February 9 UP – Five Baer field fliers were killed last night when their C-47 Cargo plane crashed 30 miles southwest of Nashville, Tennessee, while on a combat training flight." C-47A-75-DL, 42-100873, c/n 10336, of the 1st R & FPU, flown by Homer W. Ferguson, involved.

11 February
"A Marine Corps aviator was killed February 11 at 6:45 p.m. when his fighter plane failed to come out of a dive at a Mojave desert air base at Spangler, it was reported yesterday by Coroner R. E. Williams. The aviator, a first lieutenant, was on a routine flight and was diving his plane at a target from 6,000 feet, the coroner said. He added that the plane exploded as it hit the ground and the pilot was killed instantly. Coroner Williams went to the base yesterday to investigate the crash after being advised of the fatality by military authorities."

12 February
Lt. James P. (Jimmy) Christy, was killed in the crash of a Lockheed P-38J-10-LO Lightning, 42-67913, of the 311th Ferry Squadron, 27th Air Transport Group, RAF Langford Lodge, (Army Air Force Station 597), Northern Ireland, near Hawarden, Wales. Christy enlisted in the Army Air Forces in 1942, was commissioned at Randolph Field, Texas, and served as a flight instructor before being posted overseas.

16 February
Focke-Wulf Ta 152 V19, Werke Nummer 110019, prototype for the Ta 152B-5/R11 (Ta 152C-3/R11) with 1,750 hp (1,300 kW) Jumo 213A engine, is written off this date in a crash during test flight out of Langenhagen. Airframe had been damaged in 1943 wheels-up landing during testing but was repaired.

18 February
Curtiss C-46A-10-CU Commando, 41-12339, c/n 26466, of the 3d OTU, Henry F. Harvey piloting, departs McClellan Field, California, at 0045 hrs. on a flight to homebase at Reno Army Air Base, Nevada. Some 15 minutes after takeoff arcing wiring ignites hydraulic fluid. The fire burns though oxygen lines and de-icer lines, airframe impacting in American River Canyon, California. Five crew members bailed out, ~0100 hrs., but two died when exiting the plane.

18 February
Douglas SBD-2 Dauntless, BuNo 2173, of the Carrier Qualification Training Unit, Naval Air Station Glenview, Illinois, piloted by Lieutenant (junior grade) John Lendo, suffers engine failure, probably due to carburetor icing, while on approach to a Type IX training carrier on Lake Michigan. Pilot ditches dive bomber and is rescued. On 19 June 2009, the airframe was retrieved from the lake bottom and will go to the Pacific Aviation Museum on Ford Island, Oahu, Hawaii.

29 February
A Martin B-26B-10-MA Marauder medium bomber "Sweet Sue" 41-18201, renamed from original "Sweet Sue's Duke of Paraduke" part of the 432nd Bomb Squadron, 17th Bomb Group, based at the Villacidro airbase in Sardinia Italy at the time crashed a few seconds after takeoff into some of the temporary tents, killing 2 enlisted men in the tents and all 6 on board the aircraft. Crew members on board Sweet Sue: 1st LT Frank A. Pezzella NY – pilot, 38th mission; 2nd LT Howard N Owen – co-pilot; 2nd LT H. K. Oholendt – bombardier; S/Sgt Wallace W. Regan – radio/gunner; S/Sgt Eugene T. Raum – aerial/gunner; S/Sgt Townsand F. Smith TX – engineer/gunner. Ground crew included Tech Sgt George E. Beaman TX/NC (crew chief); Edward "Doc" Slater IL and Dutch Whitendofer. From eyewitness accounts, the B-26 was on her 95th mission (the most missions for a B-26 at the time) on the way to Anzio Italy, and was able to get wheels up, however was never able to elevate above 100 feet. A New York Times article the plane and crew were slated to return to the states to sell war bonds after completing 100 missions (only 4 missions away). The pilot Lt. Pezzella was drafted his senior year at Fordham University and was the captain of the golf team and quarterback prior to his draft.

3 March
Two medium bombers out of Barksdale Field, Louisiana, collide in mid-air ~20 miles N of Shreveport, killing twelve crew, the wreckage coming down on the banks of the Red River. Martin B-26B-35-MA Marauder, 41-32067, flown by Donald A. Landis, and B-26C-20-MO, 41-35169, piloted by Thomas W. Wilson, both of the 477th Bomb Squadron, 335th Bomb Group, involved.

3 March
"SANTA ANA, March 4 (AP) – The Marine air base announced today that two fliers were killed yesterday in a plane crash seven miles east of San Juan Capistrano."

4 March
A P-38 plane from Ontario Army air field crashed at 1:13PM in a vineyard half a mile east of Guasti school. Witnesses to the crash said the craft was traveling north when it suddenly went into a dive. The plane was reportedly demolished when it struck the ground, then caught fire. The pilot's remains were removed to Stone's mortuary in the town of Upland, California.

11 March
Two Consolidated B-24H Liberators of the 782d Bomb Squadron (H), 465th Bomb Group (H), deployed temporarily at Oudna Field #1 (says one source) or Oudna Field #2 (according to another account), near Tunis while the intended base, Pantanella Army Air Base, in south central Italy, is prepared for the heavy bomb group, suffer a mid-air collision during a training mission with both demolished. B-24H-15-FO, 42-52471, piloted by Charles A. Melody, and B-24H-15-FO, 412-52551, flown by Robert E. Murphy, are destroyed and both full crews killed.

21 March

Royal Air Force Halifax Bomber JP137 crashed soon after take-off from Hurn Airport in Southern England killing all on board and two civilians on the ground.

23 March
Consolidated B-24J-25-CO Liberator, 42-73228, of the 3330th Combat Crew Training Squadron, on training mission out of Biggs Field, Texas, crashes into the eastern slope of Franklin Mountain near El Paso, Texas, at 2240 hrs. during routine training flight. Seven crewmen are killed in the crash: 1st Lt. Lyle R. Jensen, Big Springs, Nebraska, whose wife was in El Paso; 2nd Lt. Benjamin C. Fricke, Indianapolis, Indiana; 2nd Lt. Robert Spears, Indianapolis; 2nd Lt. Donald B. Harris, Deming, New Mexico; Staff Sgt. Richard I. Stoney, Stoneham, Massachusetts; Sgt. William T. Hinson, Norwood, North Carolina; and Sgt. John H. House, Black River, New York.

24 March
Major-General Orde Charles Wingate flies to assess the situations in three Chindit-held bases in Burma. On his return, flying through the Indian state of Uttar Pradesh, from Imphal to Lalaghat, the USAAF North American B-25H-1-NA Mitchell bomber, 43-4242, of the 1st Air Commando Group in which he is traveling crashes into jungle-covered hills near Bishnupur, Manipur, in the present-day state of Manipur in Northeast India. He is killed along with nine others. Local thunderstorms with extreme turbulence have been suggested as the cause of the crash. Remains of Wingate and crew are later recovered and interred at Arlington National Cemetery.

24 March
Royal Air Force tailgunner Flight Sergeant Nicholas Alkemade jumps without a parachute from a burning Avro Lancaster BMk.II, DS664, 'S for Sugar', of No. 115 Squadron RAF, E of Schmallenberg, flying at 18,000 ft (5,500 m) during a raid on Germany. Alkemade falls into a forest and is decelerated by fall through tree branches before landing in deep snowdrift. Alkemade survives fall with severe bruising and a sprained leg. Captured and unable to show them his parachute, his captors disbelieve his story and suspect him of being a spy until he shows them bruising and indentation in snowdrift. Alkemade finishes war in Stalag Luft III and dies in 1987.

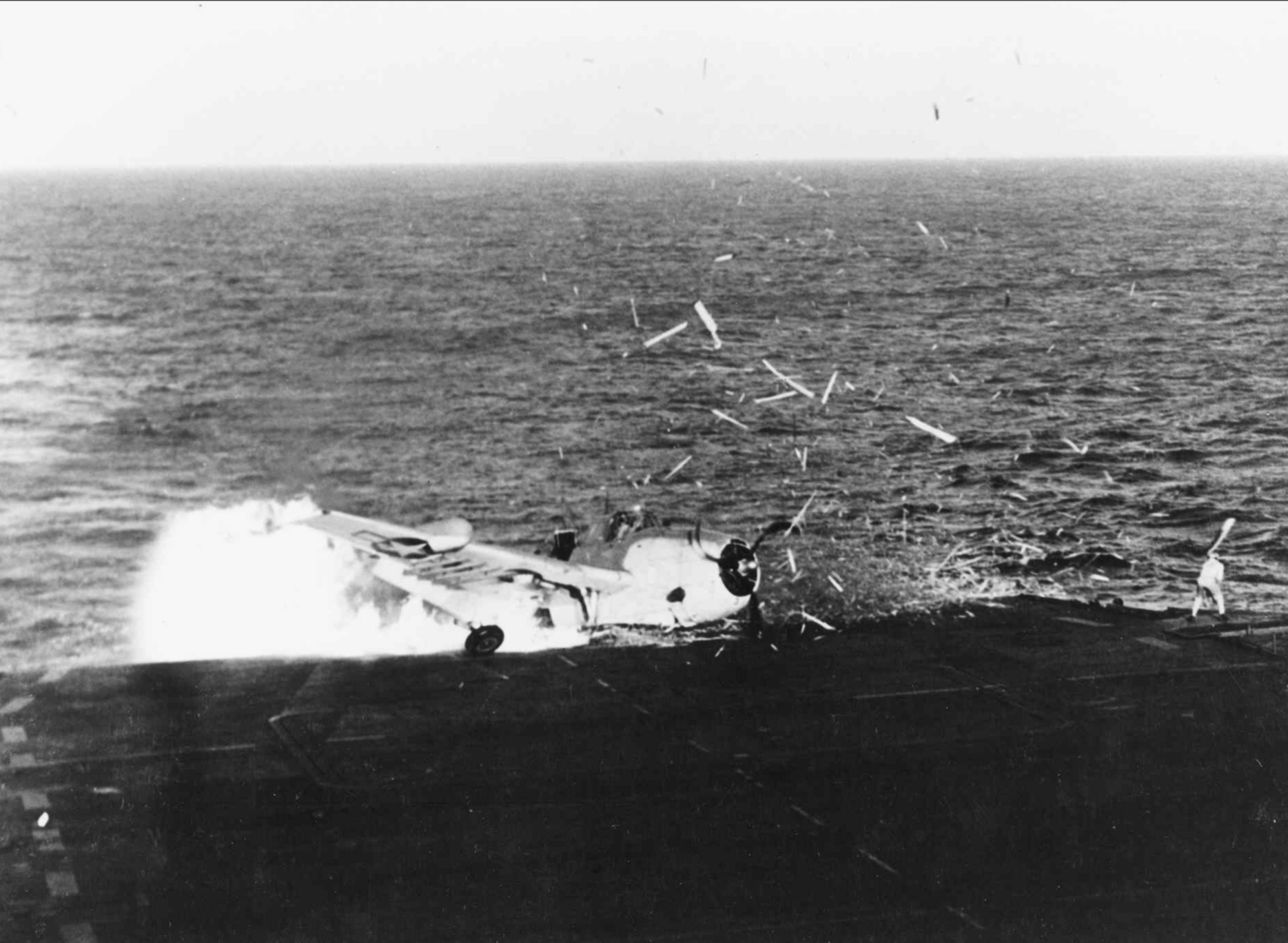
TBF ramp strike, 25 March 1944.

25 March
Grumman TBF-1 Avenger, BuNo 24295, of VC-9, piloted by Lt.(jg) William Francis Chamberlain, suffers a ramp strike coming aboard USS Solomons, during operations in the Atlantic while en route from NS Norfolk, Virginia, to Recife, Brazil. Despite the aircraft exploding and falling into the sea, the two aviators in the rear fuselage are rescued by the plane guard destroyer. Pilot stayed with the forward section which remained on deck. They would later perish while sinking U-860 at dusk on 15 June 1944, when their Avenger is caught in the blast from its low-altitude depth charge drop. This ramp strike incident has been misreported as occurring 25 May 1944, and the pilot identified as William F. Chamberlin.

31 March / 1 April
Marshal Admiral Mineichi Koga, commander-in-chief of the Imperial Japanese Navy's Combined Fleet, is killed when his plane, a Kawanishi H8K2 "Emily" flying boat, crashes at 0200 hrs. during a typhoon between Palau and Davao while overseeing the withdrawal of the Combined Fleet from its Palau headquarters on this date. His death is not announced until May 1944 when he is formally replaced by Admiral Soemu Toyoda. Koga was promoted to Marshal Admiral posthumously and he was accorded a state funeral. His grave is at the Tama Cemetery, outside of Tokyo. Eight others on board survive the crash.

8 April
Fifth Fisher XP-75-GC Eagle, 44-32163, out of the Fisher Plant No.2, Cleveland, Ohio, crashes at Cleveland after pilot engaged in low-level aerobatics that reportedly exceeded the placarded limitations. Pilot Hamilton J. Wagner killed.

9 April
Fairey Albacore, X9117, of No. 415 Squadron RCAF, engaged in a fighter affiliation exercise, crashes near Bosham, West Sussex while making a low turn. All four crew KWF.

9 April
Consolidated B-24D-135-CO Liberator, 42-41128, c/n 2203, of the 420th AAF Base Unit, March Field, California, piloted by Frank A. Gurley, crashes in weather-related accident 3 miles SW of Marine Corps Auxiliary Air Station Mojave, Mojave, California, while on a routine training mission to simulate a long range bombing mission. All ten crew members are KWF. Site rediscovered in 2005.

11 April
Short Stirling B.Mk.III, EH947, of 75 Squadron, suffers engine failure during non-operational flight, force-landed at Icklingham, Suffolk.

13 April
After downing 3 planes on 8 April, Don Gentile was the top scoring 8th Air Force ace when he crashed his personal North American P-51B-7-NA Mustang, 43-6913, 'VF-T', named "Shangri La", this date while stunting over the 4th Fighter Group's airfield at Debden for a group of assembled press reporters and movie cameras. He buzzed the airfield too low, struck the rising ground, and broke the back of his fighter. Col. Donald Blakeslee immediately grounded Major Gentile as a result, even though his combat tour was completed, and he was sent back to the US for a tour selling War Bonds. The official news release to the press glosses over the actual cause of the crash, stating that Gentile "was badly shaken when he was forced to crash land his Mustang fighter at his home base after a recent mission, it was disclosed today" (13 April).

13 April
During a Naval Air Training Command (NATC) evaluation flight of a Budd RB-1 Conestoga prototype, U.S. Navy BuNo 39293, NX37097, at Naval Air Station Patuxent River, Maryland, the aircraft crashed, killing one of the crew. The aircraft was damaged beyond repair and written off, but the pilot reported that the stainless steel construction of the plane contributed to saving his life.

15 April
Second prototype Dornier Do 335 V2, Werkenummer 230002, CP+UB, suffers rear engine fire while undergoing testing at the Erprobungsstelle Rechlin central Luftwaffe test facility just outside Rechlin, Germany, written off.

19 April
U.S. Navy K-class blimp K-133, of ZP-22, operating out of Naval Air Station Houma, Louisiana, is caught in a thunderstorm while patrolling over the Gulf of Mexico. Ship goes down and twelve of thirteen crew are lost. Sole survivor is recovered after spending 21 hours in the water. The Associated Press reports on 22 April that the Eighth Naval District stated that there were nine fatalities.

21 April
Generaloberst Hans-Valentin Hube (1890–1944), a German general who served in the German Army during the First and Second World Wars, and recipient of the Diamonds to the Knight's Cross, is killed when the Heinkel He 111 which was shuttling him to Berlin crashes shortly after takeoff in Salzburg at Ainring. Hube was nicknamed der Mensch ("The Man" or better "The human being") by his troops during the Second World War.

21 April
Southeast door of blimp hangar at Naval Air Station Houma, Louisiana, goes inoperable, is chained open. A gust of wind carries three Goodyear ZNP-K airships, all of ZP-22, out into the night; K-56, BuNo 30178, travels 4.5 miles (7.2 km), crashes into trees, K-57, BuNo 30179, explodes and burns 4 miles (6.4 km) from the air station, K-62, BuNo 30184, fetches up against high-tension powerlines a quarter mile away, burns. K-56 is salvaged, sent to Goodyear at Akron, Ohio, repaired and returned to service.

24 April
A Boeing B-17G-55-BO Flying Fortress, 42-102685, of the 271st Air Base Unit, Kearney Army Airfield, Kearney, Nebraska, crashes six miles N of Bertrand, Nebraska, after an oxygen fire breaks out in flight. Six crew bail out but both pilots are killed. Dead were 2d Lt. Thomas G. Eppinger, pilot, of Huntington Woods, Michigan; and 2d Lt. Robert D. Shaw, co-pilot, of Vicksburg, Mississippi. Survivors were 2d Lt. Voris H. Fabik, navigator, of East St. Louis, Illinois; 2d Lt. Lewis E. Louraine, bombardier, of Purcell, Oklahoma; 2d Lt. Robert Durocher, assistant bombardier, hometown not available; S/Sgt. Clifford M. Bowen, engineer, of Jefferson, Oregon; S/Sgt. Obert M. Lay, radioman, of Aurora, Illinois; and Sgt. James T. Grantham, waist gunner, of Phoenix, Arizona.

24 April
A Consolidated B-24 Liberator (s/n 42-5111) crashed into a mountain in Epsom, New Hampshire, killing all 10 occupants.

28 April
A U.S. Navy Douglas R4D Skytrain crashed in "wilderness-locked terrain" 30 miles SE of Flagstaff, Arizona, initially killing 18 and injuring the remaining four aboard. It was reported that two of the four injured made it to a ranch, while the other two were later found at the crash site. The death toll rose to 19 on 3 May, when Radioman third class Joseph Daniels Dalesiodied in hospital.

29 April
Seven people were killed, "including two women and a 20-month-old child", when a USAAF twin-engined bomber crashed into a house in Memphis, Tennessee. Resulting explosions burned five of the "bodies beyond recognition", and burned two adjoining houses.

7 May
Seven passengers and crew members were killed when a USAAF B-25 bomber crashed into Oaklands Cemetery in West Goshen Township, Chester County, Pennsylvania, after experiencing engine failure during a squall. The plane nose-dived into the ground and exploded, killing everyone on board. One or two victims bailed out, but they were too low for their parachutes to open fully. Newspapers reported no injuries on the ground. Hundreds of West Chester residents witnessed the crash, and up to ten thousand onlookers gathered to watch its aftermath.

8 May
Vought OS2U-2 Kingfisher, BuNo 3092, suffers midair collision with OS2U-3 Kingfisher, BuNo 5422, 1/2–mile S of Naval Air Station Pensacola, Florida.

10 May
An instructor pilot and a student pilot flying Vultee BT-13B Valiant, 42-90353, of the 262d Combat Crew Training School, back to Bruning Army Air Field, Nebraska, after a training session, and Republic P-47D-15-RA Thunderbolt, 42-23149, of the same unit, whose pilot had been conducting individual training, returning to the same airfield, suffer a mid-air collision. Neither pilot was aware of the other aircraft's presence and both planes were far from the airfield control tower. After both aircraft made simultaneous turns, they were headed directly toward one another at high speed. They struck at approximately 4,000 feet, causing both aircraft to spiral toward the ground. The BT-13 crashed on the Frank Stych farm, ~3 miles W and 2 miles S of Milligan. The P-47 crashed on the Fred and Dorothy Stych farm, ~3 miles W and 3 miles S of Milligan. The P-47 pilot, F/O John Dobony, was killed. Both pilots in the BT-13 bailed out. The instructor pilot, 2d Lt. Frank W. Mrenak, survived, but the student pilot, 1st Lt. William D. Jaeger, lost his life. A Nebraska historical marker was erected in 2010 by the Milligan Memorial Committee for the World War II Fatal Air Crashes near Milligan, Nebraska. Accident reports give the location of the crash as 3 miles E of Ohiowa, Nebraska.

15 May
Ex-RAF de Havilland Mosquito B.IV, DK296, formerly flown by 105 Squadron as 'GB-G', delivered to the Soviet Union for testing on 19 April 1944 by Soviet flight crew, is written off this date in landing accident at Sverdlovsk when pilot A. I. Kabanov loses control with engines at low power setting, turns to port, runs off runway, shears off landing gear and skids to a stop on its belly. Pilot and navigator P. I. Perevalov unhurt. This was the ninth flight of DK296 (which never received a Soviet serial) since it arrived in Russia and was the only Mosquito delivered to Russia. Kabanov was the Deputy Director of the Scientific Research Institute of the Air Force at this time, and had much experience flying foreign types.

16 May
Two Fleet Air Arm Vought Corsair Is of 732 Naval Air Squadron, HMS Saker, out of Naval Air Station Brunswick, crash into Sebago Lake, Maine, killing Royal Navy pilots SubLt. Vaughan Reginald Gill and SubLt. Raymond L. Knott. Knott, in JT160, ex-USN BuNo 18182, hit the water first and then Gill, in JT132, ex-USN BuNo 18154, struck the water column from the first crash (or possibly collided with JT160 on a skip) and went into the lake inverted. Neither pilot's body was recovered. When Historic Aircraft Restoration Corp. located one airframe in July 2003, they attempted to lay claim to the salvage rights, but a federal judge ruled in November 2003 that admiralty law does not apply as the lake is non-navigable from a federal standpoint, so ownership of the lake bottom and of the airframes lies with the State of Maine. By dismissing the case, the judge essentially ruled for the Maine and British governments, both of which oppose salvage as the airframes are regarded as wargraves.
16 May
Lieutenant Commander David Wooster Taylor, 32, departs Naval Air Station Quonset Point, Rhode Island, for a routine training mission in Grumman F6F-3 Hellcat, BuNo 41944, but is killed when his fighter crashes and burns at the Sunset Valley Reservation in East Greenwich. The First Naval District headquarters at Boston said that Taylor was survived by his wife Virginia, 24, of North Kingston, and two young children, Jean, 4, and David Wooster Taylor III, 3.

28 May
Luftwaffe Messerschmitt Bf 109G-6, 'Red 3', from the training unit Jagdgruppe West, crashed into Lake Trzebun, 1 mile (1.6 km) south of Jaworze, West Pomeranian Voivodeship, moments after taking off from the shoreside Jaworze (then called Gebbert) airfield, killing pilot Feldwebel Ernst Pleines. The wreck was discovered in June 1999, in 56 feet (17 m) of water, and recovered for the Polish Eagles Aviation Foundation for restoration and display.

29 May
Luftwaffe fighter experten Friedrich-Karl "Tutti" Müller (140 victories in 600 combat sorties) is killed in a landing accident at Salzwedel, when his Messerschmitt Bf 109 G-6, Werknummer 410827, stalls on landing approach at low altitude. He is posthumously promoted to Oberstleutnant.

4 June
Capt. James W. Wilkinson, 31, of Swarthmore, Pennsylvania, C.O. of the 82d Fighter Squadron, 78th Fighter Group, theorizes that if steam locomotives can be hit in the right places when strafed they will be put out of action for months rather than weeks. "The RAF was keen for him to demonstrate his theory, and arranged for a real locomotive to serve as his target in Wales. The exercise was scheduled for 4 June, but bad weather en route from Duxford held up Wilkinson's flight clearance. In an effort to get airborne he radioed the control tower and stated that he was going on a local test flight." Heading west, he flew Republic P-47D-22-RE Thunderbolt, 42-26256, 'MX-G', into a mist-shrouded mountain ~4.5 miles NE of Llandovery, in Carmarthenshire, Wales, and was killed. Wilkinson transferred to the 78th FG in November 1943 and became commanding officer of the 82d FS on 23 May 1943. He was awarded the Air Medal, Distinguished Flying Cross with 4 oak leaf clusters, Distinguished Service Cross and the Silver Star. He was credited with seven victories, six air, one ground.

6 June
Eighteen U.S. Navy men are killed and 12 injured when Consolidated PB4Y-1 Liberator, BuNo 32073, (former B-24D, 42-40711), of VB-117, crashes on takeoff into a structure at Naval Auxiliary Air Station Camp Kearny on Kearny Mesa, NE of San Diego, California. The Eleventh Naval District said that seven men were seriously injured and five were in hospital with minor injuries. Twelve crew were aboard the plane but three survived with injuries. The other dead and injured were station personnel. The bomber hit the supply hut of VB-102, the destruction of that unit's supplies delaying the squadron's Pacific deployment by a month.
8 June
Two North American B-25J Mitchell bombers collide in mid-air over the Kalihi neighborhood of Honolulu, five miles E of Hickam Field. B-25J-1-NC, 43-27786, piloted by James L. Pauley, and B-25J-5-NC, 43-27842, flown by James M. Owens II, plunge into a congested residential area, setting eleven or twelve dwellings alight. Ten women and children are killed in addition to all four air crew. This appears to be the largest death toll in a single fire in the history of the Hawaiian Islands.

8 June
Consolidated C-87-CF Liberator Express, 41-24006, c/n 801, crashes during attempted belly landing at Station 4, Jorhat, India, this date. Pilot was Lawrence C. Ackerson.

9 June
Mid-air collision between two Naval Auxiliary Air Facility Lewiston-based Vought Corsair I fighters, JT128, flown by Mid. Edward Fredrick Kingsley Webb, and JT183, flown by SubLt. Richard George Bennett, over Lewiston, Maine; both are able to land and crew are uninjured.

11 June
2d Lt. Lawrence R. Casey, on a fighter sweep on D-Day + 5 in Republic P-47D-11-RE Thunderbolt, 42-75610, of the 83d Fighter Squadron, 78th Fighter Group, out of USAAF Station 357, RAF Duxford, suffers prop failure due to lack of oil, but suffers no fire, and bails out, coming down ~10 miles N of Evreux, France. Hidden by the Resistance, he meets up with the 66th Tank Regiment on 25 June and soon is aboard a C-47 back to England.

12 June
On this date, IJN submarine I-10 assembled and launched her Yokosuka E14Y to reconnoiter Majuro, in the Marianas. "Since the American expeditionary force had departed six days earlier, the aviator saw nothing important, and his plane, crashing on landing, had to be abandoned." I-10 will be sunk on 4 July 1944.

Circa 13 June
As Vice Admiral Jisaburō Ozawa sorties from Tawi-Tawi for Operation A-Go, a deck crash occurs "that cast a deep gloom over the Mobile Fleet. A Jill torpedo-bomber, flown by an inexpert pilot, made a crash landing on the deck of flagship Taihō, collided with another bomber, burst into flames; and before the fire was put out two Zekes, two Judys and two Jills had been consumed. To the Japanese mind this was more than the loss of six valuable planes; coming so shortly after the sortie, it was considered an evil omen." Taihō, commissioned on 7 March 1944, will sink on 19 June during the Battle of the Philippine Sea after suffering a single torpedo hit from the USS Albacore, due to explosions resulting from design flaws and poor damage control.

13 June
The Bäckebo rocket incident – A German V-2 rocket, specially equipped to be hand-controlled in flight by the Wasserfall anti-aircraft system, test-fired from Peenemünde, Germany and destined for a landing in Denmark, goes astray, exploding at ~1605 hours over a cornfield near the Swedish hamlet of Gräsdals, close to Bäckebo. The air explosion created a 13-foot wide crater. The Swedish government later transferred two tons of V2 debris to England, transported in a Douglas Dakota, reportedly in exchange for two squadrons of new tanks, or Supermarine Spitfires. The last leg of the delivery flight, from Scotland to London, was flown by Bernt Balchen.

20 June
Lt. Donald A. Innis, U.S. Navy, out of the Naval Ordnance Test Station at Inyokern, California, flying over the Salton Sea in Southern California on a rocket firing flight, launches weapon but the rocket body explodes prematurely on his starboard wing. His F6F-3 Hellcat, BuNo 40860, which was in a 15-degree dive at the time went into a slow spin and crashed into the sea.

22 June
A U.S. Army Air Force Luke Field flight instructor, flying low over Highway 89 near Wittmann, Arizona, becomes momentarily distracted and accidentally strikes an automobile, the wing of his AT-6 Texan decapitating a motorist. "Marana Field, Ariz., July 15 [Special] – Convicted of murder in the decapitation of a motorist with the wing of his low flying plane on an Arizona highway, a 21 year old Luke field flying instructor today heard a court martial order him imprisoned for life at hard labor and dismissed from the service. The officer, Lt. Howard E. Stittsworth of Wakefield, Kas., was ordered confined to his quarters at Luke field pending a review of the verdict by Maj. Gen. Ralph Cousins, commanding general of the western flying training command, by the judge advocate general in Washington, D.C., and by President Roosevelt. Lt. Dean C. Fundingsland, 23, Grand Forks, N.D., senior officer in the plane with Stittsworth at the time of the accident, was convicted Monday of a violation of flying regulations and was ordered dismissed from the service. Standing at attention as the verdict was read, Lt. Stittsworth appeared stunned by the decision. He closed his eyes momentarily as if comprehending the significance of the sentence. He turned and slumped into a chair with his head in his arms as members of his defense staff consoled him. The dark haired officer admitted on the stand yesterday that he was piloting a plane that bounced on the highway near Wittmann, Ariz., on June 22 and decapitated Earl W. Nepple, Los Angeles, Cal., hotel man. Stittsworth said he was flying low between two auxiliary fields adjacent to highway 89 and was leaning into the cockpit, trying to fix a balky landing gear, when he felt an impact. He said he was not aware of an automobile below him. Corp. Hammond Waugh, Luke field, who was inspecting lights on an auxiliary field, testified that the plane flew low over the field, 'buzzing' his truck."

29 June
Republic P-47D-1-RA Thunderbolt, 42-22331, c/n 82, accepted 30 March 1943, of C Flight, 1st AF / 1st FG / E Section / 124th Base Unit (Fighter), "A-362", from Bluethenthal AAF, piloted by 2nd Lt. Robert B Boyd, Jr., makes gear-up crash landing on Ocean Isle Beach, North Carolina. Abandoned in place, the hulk of the wings and lower fuselage is uncovered by Hurricane Floyd in 1999. Now stored at the Carolinas Aviation Museum, Charlotte, North Carolina. Pictures of salvage on beach March 2000, P-47G Salvage c/o Carolina Military Gallery.

11 July
South Portland A-26 Invader crash: Lieutenant Philip Russell was attempting to land his Douglas A-26B-5-DT Invader, 43-22253, at the Portland-Westbrook Municipal Airport in Maine at 1645 hours. In foggy conditions, Russell lost control of the plane and crashed into a trailer park in a nearby neighborhood in South Portland. Two crew and 17 people on the ground were killed, making it the deadliest aviation accident in Maine history.

11 July
A U.S. Army Air Force Boeing B-17G-75-BO Flying Fortress, 44-38023, en route from Kearney Army Airfield, Nebraska, to Dow Field in Bangor, Maine, for overseas deployment, crashed into Deer Mountain in Parkertown Township in North Oxford, Maine, during a thunderstorm, killing all 10 crew: Sgt. James A. Benson, Sgt. Gerald V. Biddle, 2nd Lt. John T. Cast, 2nd Lt. John W. Drake, 2nd Lt. William Hudgens, Cpl. John H. Jones, Staff Sgt. Wayne D. McGavran, Sgt. Cecil L. Murphy, 2nd Lt. Robert S. Talley, and Sgt. Clarence M. Waln. Locals saw the plane circling before it struck terrain 500 feet below the summit. It apparently descended below the clouds, struck treetops, and cartwheeled across the mountainside. Two days later, after a search by more than 100 spotters from the Civil Air Patrol, the Army Air Force, the Navy, and the Royal Canadian Air Force, the Boeing B-17's wreckage was found on the side of the mountain. This remains the second-deadliest military crash in Maine history. By coincidence, it occurred the same day as the state's deadliest aviation incident, when an A-26 Invader crash at South Portland killed two crew and 17 on the ground.

12 July
The crash of a Bell P-39 Airacobra out of Victorville Army Air Field, California, kills Flight Officer Ruben Herrera, 23, of La Mesa, New Mexico, with the fighter coming down 20 miles W of the base, at approximately 1900 hrs., during routine training manoeuvers. Wreckage found at 0900 hrs. 13 July by search aircraft. Herrera had been assigned to Victorville since 1 July as a student pilot in transitional training for combat duty. He was the son of Mr. and Mrs. Y. Herrera, of La Mesa, N.M.

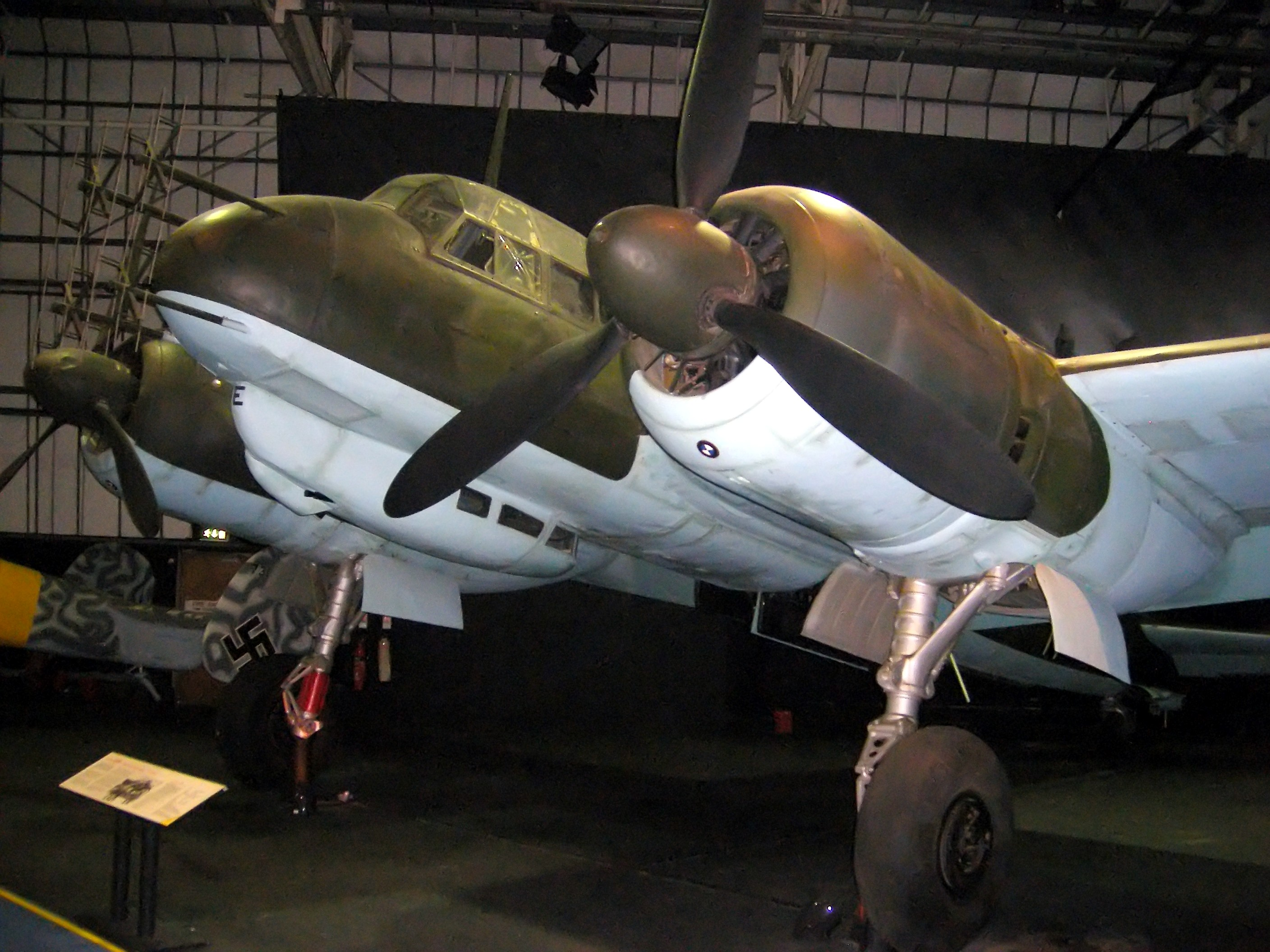
The earlier Ju 88 R-1 nightfighter flown to RAF Dyce by its defecting crew the year before the 13 July 1944 event

13 July
A Luftwaffe Junkers Ju 88 G-1 night fighter of 7 Staffel/NJG 2, bearing Geschwaderkennung code 4R+UR, on North Sea night patrol landed at RAF Woodbridge. This aircraft carried recent versions of the FuG 220 Lichtenstein SN-2 VHF-band radar, FuG 350 Naxos-Z and FuG 227 Flensburg homer which were being successfully used to intercept RAF night bombers. The German crew had only just completed 100 hours of flight training, and had flown by compass heading, but proceeded on a reciprocal (opposite) course to that intended and thought they were over their own airfield. Within days, the Royal Aircraft Establishment (RAE) analysed the radar equipment and devised countermeasures. This 'coup' repeated the events of the previous year, when a similar radar-equipped Ju 88 (pictured) was flown by a defecting crew to the UK.

14 July
The crash of Beechcraft UC-45B Expeditor, 43-35569, of the 115th Base Unit, Godman Army Airfield, Fort Knox, Kentucky, in a violent storm, at Chattanooga, Tennessee, kills U.S. Army Maj. Gen. Paul W. Newgarden, commander of the 10th Armored Division, and five other officers, including two colonels. "In the plane, which disintegrated after crashing headlong through an orchard, were Col. Renn Lawrence, commander of a combat unit; 2d Lt. J. R. Lockett, Grenada, Miss.; Flight Officer E. S. Ihle, Slater, Ia., and Staff Sgt. F. J. Allbright, Bradford, O. The army withheld the name of the second colonel, pending notification of next of kin. All were en route from Fort Knox, Ky., to Augusta, Ga., where Gen. Newgarden was to have reviewed troops of the 10th armored division in celebration of the second anniversary of his command. Col. Howard Clark, Fort Oglethorpe commander, said the plane was torn into small pieces when it sheared through the orchard after narrowly missing a dormitory of the Bonny Oaks school." The twin-engined aircraft, piloted by Everett S. Ihle, comes down three miles NE of Chattanooga Municipal Airport.

14 July
A USAAF B-24 Liberator bomber crashed and burned in the desert 25 miles north of Shavers Summit Army Airfield, California. Nine of the 12 crew parachuted to safety, uninjured, before the plane crashed and burned, but the remaining three died in the crash. The plane was returning to its base at March Field, California, from an Army Air field in Arizona.

15 July
Consolidated B-24J-5-FO Liberator, 42-50871, of the 272d Base Unit, Topeka AAF, Kansas, piloted by Levine S. Nelson, crashes one mile NW of Ashville, New York, killing all five crew. "Syracuse, N.Y., July 15 (AP) – Lt. Harry A. Dunn, public relations officer of the Syracuse army air base, announced tonight the names of the five flyers killed in the crash of an army bomber near Blockville, N.Y., early today. The dead include 2nd Lt. Vernon E. Stiltz, Milwaukee, Wis.; 2nd Lt. John Jurzazak, Chicago, and Sgt. Art L. Brown, Sterling, Ill." The Aviation Archaeological Investigation and Research website indicates that the bomber was involved in a mid-air collision, but provides no further details, and no other aircraft appear in accident report listings at this location this date.

16 July
A Royal Air Force Douglas Dakota III, KG472, c/n 12584, assigned to RAF in March 1944, with No. 267 Squadron RAF, departed Bari Airport, Italy, on a special infiltration and evacuation mission to Yugoslavia. At Tičevo landing ground (a partisan airfield at Bosanska Dubica, in the Nazi puppet-entity Independent State of Croatia), the pilot attempted a go around after overshooting. The aircraft gained height rapidly for a short distance then rapidly lost height as the pilot retracted the flaps and crashed at 2315 hrs. about 500 yards beyond the end of the flare path. striking the ground on an even keel with both motors under power. A Court of Inquiry found that, "the accident was caused by the retraction of the flaps when the aircraft was at low speed near the ground." Four crew and 17 passengers were on board of which 11 were killed, one died of injuries later and nine injured. Other passengers were Yugoslavians. The dead are now buried in the Belgrade War Cemetery, with exception of Air Commodore Guy Lloyd Carter DSO AFC of HQ Balkan AF who subsequently died at Bari Hospital on 18 July 1944 and who is buried at Bari War Cemetery. Among the injured passengers were Winston Churchill's SOE agent son, Randolph Spencer-Churchill, Capt. Evelyn Waugh and Mr P Jordan all of the British Mission. Spencer-Churchill sustains back and knee injuries, while Waugh is severely burned.

18 July
Hauptman Werner Thierfelder, unit commander of Erprobungskommando 262, out of Lechfeld, is lost in crash of Me 262A (Me 262 S6), W. Nr. 130011, VI+AK, under unclear circumstances. Luftwaffe records indicate that he was shot down but U.S. and British records show no comparable engagement. A possible cause is that Thierfelder exceeded the airframe's limiting Mach number in a dive, perhaps while pursuing an Allied reconnaissance aircraft, leading to an irrecoverable dive. Pilot bailed out but chute failed, possibly due to ripping, and he landed near the airframe crash site. This was the first combat loss of the 262.

19 July
Boeing B-17G-60-BO Flying Fortress, 42-102937, "Ready Freddie", of the 412th Bomb Squadron, 95th Bomb Group, crashed at RAF Duxford, Cambridgeshire, United Kingdom, when attempting to buzz the airfield at too low an altitude. The aircraft clipped a hangar and crashed into a barracks block killing all thirteen on board and one person on the ground.

20 July
Two North American P-51C Mustangs of Pinellas RTU, III Fighter Command, depart Pinellas Army Air Field, Florida, at 0700 hrs. EWT on a local gunnery training mission, but instead of flying the briefed mission, the pilots flew to Jacksonville, 180 miles distant, where 2d Lt. John Keane "Jack" Egar, in P-51C-5-NT, 42-103655, descended at ~0745 hrs. to ~75 feet altitude to buzz his childhood home at 2749 Post Street. He struck two trees and the plane skidded across the street, hit a third tree, several houses and a line of garages. "The engine went through an apartment building, where, according to the July 21, 1944, edition of The Florida Times-Union, it narrowly missed a married couple and their 9-year-old daughter, before coming to a stop in the middle of Willow Branch Avenue." Egar's body was found in the wreckage. His wingman, 2d Lt. James R. Cope, apparently jerked on his controls in P-51C-5-NT, 42-103728, to avoid Egar's fighter, the Army report said, and he then hit a different cluster of trees. "His plane followed a course behind the homes on Post Street before hitting 2865 Post St. That house was demolished by fire and the house next door was gutted by the flames, the report said." Cope was killed, as was Millard E. McGhee, "a 27-year-old shoe store manager, who was in his bathroom shaving when the engine of Cope's plane came through the wall and hit him. According to the report, 18 houses and four apartment buildings sustained some level of damage. So did a dozen garages and eight vehicles. Remarkably, only one civilian was killed. Three others were injured, one seriously." The cause was found to be pilot error and negligence. A commemoration of the accident was held at the crash site on 21 July 2012.

20 July
"Walla Walla, Wash., July 20 (AP) – All 12 crewmen were killed when a Liberator bomber from the Walla Walla Army Air field crashed yesterday near Touchet, 17 miles west of there, after exploding in the air."

21 July
Royal Navy Vought Corsair I, JT117, of 738 Naval Air Squadron, out of Naval Auxiliary Air Facility Lewiston, Maine, crashes in Mount Vernon woods (Cottle Hill area) following engine failure, killing Sub-Lt. Peter John Cann.

21 July
Three US Army Air Force Douglas C-47s (42-100712, 42-92115, and 43-30664) disappear while flying at 500 feet over the Atlantic Ocean. The three aircraft lost radio contact with the squadron leader and flew into a storm. Lost aboard 42-100712 were: 1Lt. William E. Bechelm, Jr., of Illinois, 2Lt. Oakes M. Colwell of New Jersey, 2Lt. Donald W. Copeland of Iowa, Sergeant Leo C. Fair of Louisiana, and Sergeant Edward G. Hillman of Pennsylvania. Lost aboard 42-92115 were: 1Lt. Chris C. Nicorvo of New Jersey, 2Lt. Junior R. Davidson of Oklahoma, Flight Officer James M. Crew of Alabama, Staff Sergeant Fred J. Carini of Pennsylvania, and Sergeant Frank E. Sherwood of New York. Lost aboard 43-30664 were: Captain Robert J. Miskell of Ohio, 2Lt. Milton J. Verberg of Michigan, 2Lt. Walter H. Zuidema (origin unknown), Corporal Roger O. Weston of Massachusetts, and Sergeant Ben L. Dean of Texas.

22 July
"Tampa, Fla., July 22 (UP) – Eight Army fliers were killed, 10 were injured and two are missing as a result of a collision of two Flying Fortresses in the air near Brooksville, Fla."

23 July
Two Curtiss RA-25A Shrikes, of the 4134th Base Unit, Spokane Army Air Field, collide in flight while participating in a flypast for the Spokane Air Service command "Stay-on-the-Job" air show near Spokane, Washington. Part of a three-plane formation, the left-hand aircraft collided with the middle plane during a turn, both crashing into a valley. Pilot 2nd Lt. George E. Chrep and engineer-rated passenger Sgt. Joseph M. Revinskas were killed in the crash of 42-79804, while pilot 2nd Lt. William R. Scott and passenger Captain Ford K. Sayre, a noted snow skier on the east coast, were killed in the crash of 42-79826. A Paramount Pictures newsreel crew caught the accident on film, which was examined by the crash investigation board for clues to the accident. This footage was later incorporated into the 1956 film Earth vs. the Flying Saucers.
23 July
Focke-Wulf Fw 190C V33 prototype, Werke Nummer 0058, modified to Fw 190 V33/U1 as prototype for Ta 152H-0 with 1,750 hp (1,300 kW) Junkers Jumo 213E-1 engine and new wing fuel tanks of the definitive Ta 152H-1, comprising three tanks in each inner portion, located just aft of the truncated mainspar, first flown 12 July 1944, crashes this date out of Langenhagen, setting back the flight test programme.

31 July
Noted aviation pioneer and author Antoine de Saint-Exupéry vanishes without a trace while flying a Free French Forces Lockheed F-5B-1-LO, 42-68223, c/n 2734, of II/33 Squadron, out of Borgo-Porreta, Bastia, Corsica, a reconnaissance variant of the P-38 Lightning, over the Mediterranean; his fate remains a mystery until 2004 when the wreckage of his plane is discovered. While the cause of the crash is unknown, analysis of the wreckage and enemy wartime records suggests that the crash was an accident unrelated to enemy action. A former Luftwaffe pilot has published a volume in which he claims to have shot down a French-marked Lightning, but his claim is largely discounted.

August
Test program of Lavochkin La-7TK, fitted with turbo-supercharged M-82FN engine in July–August 1944 comes to sudden end when one TK-3 supercharger explodes and airframe is destroyed.

5 August
During test flight out of the Fisher plant at Cleveland, Ohio, third Fisher XP-75 Eagle, 44-32161, crashes at Fairfield Village, Ohio, three miles (5 km) N of Cleveland, after an explosion and fire at 23,000 feet (7,000 m) – pilot Russell Stuart Weeks bailed out at 4,000 feet (1,200 m).

9 August
Consolidated B-24J-155-CO Liberator, 44-40348, c/n 4284, to U.S. Navy as PB4Y-1, BuNo 38766, of VB-116, piloted by Lt. Romane C. Anderson, of Houston, Texas, swerves off runway on takeoff from NAB Eniwetok, Marshall Islands, Central Pacific, crashes into parked aircraft while carrying nine X 500-pound bombs. Load of 2,900 gallons of fuel ignites, setting of seven of the bombs, destroying either 106 parked naval aircraft or 85 planes destroyed with 55 more damaged. One source states that nine crew are killed and two injured while another states that ten crew are killed or died later. The Navy publicly reveals news of the accident on 24 August 1945.

13 August
Focke-Wulf Fw 190C V30 prototype, Werke Nummer 0055, modified to Fw 190 V30/U1 as prototype for Ta 152H-0, rebuilt with Fw 190D 1,750 hp (1,300 kW) Jumo 213A-1 power egg, but without new wingtanks, crashes this date on flight out of Langenhagen after only one week of testing. First flown in new guise on 6 August.

21 August
Lieutenant John M. Armitage, USNR, is killed while conducting air firing tests of a Tiny Tim rocket at the Naval Ordnance Test Station at Inyokern, California. He flew into the ground from 1,500 ft (460 m). in a Curtiss SB2C-1C Helldiver, BuNo 018248, and was killed after the launching the rocket. Accident investigators discovered that the shock wave from the rocket's blast caused a jam in the SB2C's flight controls. Airfield dedicated 30 May 1945 in his honor as Armitage Field, now part of Naval Air Weapons Station China Lake, California.

23 August
Freckleton Air Disaster – A United States Army Air Forces Consolidated B-24H-20-CF Liberator, 42-50291, "Classy Chassis II", crashes into a school at Freckleton, Lancashire, England at 1047 hrs. while on approach to Warton Aerodrome. Twenty adults, 38 children and the three-man crew are killed. In addition to a memorial in the village churchyard, a marker was placed at the site of the accident in 2007.

23 August
Maj. Carlo Emanuele Buscaglia, one of Italy's most noted aviators, crashes this date in a Martin Baltimore light bomber. After the armistice of 8 September 1943, Buscaglia was asked to fight alongside the Allies, as a member of the newly formed Aeronautica Cobelligerante del Sud. In the meantime, in the northern part of Italy still occupied by Germany, a wing of the Aeronautica Nazionale Reppublicana (the Air Force of the puppet Italian Social Republic) had also been named after him. On 15 July 1944 Buscaglia assumed command of the 28th Bomber Wing, equipped with Baltimores, based on Campo Vesuvio airport, near Naples. On 23 August, while attempting to fly one of the new planes during the early transition training phase, without an instructor, Buscaglia crashes on take-off, dying in hospital in Naples the following day.

27 August or 28 August
One of the two Vought OS2U-3 Kingfishers assigned aboard USS New Jersey, BuNo 5549, of VO-7, piloted by Ensign Allen R. Trecartin, crashes while trying to land ~2,000 yards off the vessel's starboard quarter while the battlewagon is transiting from Pearl Harbor, H.I., to Manus Island in the Admiralties. Pilot and rear seater are rescued by the destroyer USS Hickox and the OS2U sunk by destroyer gunfire. Date discrepancy may have to do with the carrier's position relative to the International Date Line.

Post September
Blohm & Voss BV 155 V1, first flown 1 September 1944, crashes on later test flight for unknown reasons. Second prototype, BV 155B (V2), completed just before war's end, is recovered by Allies in hangar at Hamburg-Finkenwärder and taken to RAE Farnborough, England for examination. Aircraft is currently in the hands of the Paul Garber Restoration Facility.
September
First two attempted test flights of the Fieseler Fi 103R (Reichenberg) at Lärz on consecutive days results in both pilots killed.
4 September
Douglas A-26B-15-DL Invader, 41-39158, first assigned to Aeroplane and Armament Experimental Station, Boscombe Down on 11 July 1944 for six weeks' testing (but no RAF serial assigned), then to 2 Group for further evaluation, crashes this date when the upper turret cover left airframe, striking the vertical tail.
6 September
First prototype (and only one completed) McDonnell XP-67 Moonbat, 42-11677, suffers fire in starboard engine during functional test flight at 10,000 feet (3,000 m). Pilot E.E. Elliot manages to bring stricken airframe into Lambert Field, St. Louis, Missouri, flames gut the fuselage, engine nacelle and wheelwell before firefighters halt blaze. As jet engined project that will become the FD-1 Phantom is already on the horizon, project is cancelled.
Bell P-39 Airacobra #42-18290 crashes southwest of Victorville Army Airfield, Victorville, California. Pilot 2nd Lt. Pat L. Montgomery is killed instantly.

8 September
2d Lt. John T. McCarthy, in Republic P-47D-6-RE Thunderbolt, 42-74782, of the 262d FPTS, on a combined interception training mission out of Bruning Army Air Field, Nebraska, at ~1540 hrs. CWT, at 16,000 feet altitude, makes a pursuit curve mock attack from the high port side of Boeing B-17G-35-DL Flying Fortress, 42-107159, terminating his attack from about 250 to 300 yards away from the bomber, but "mushes" into the B-17 while breaking away, hitting the port wing near the number one (port outer) engine. "Both planes burst into flames immediately, the B-17 exploding, disintegrating into several pieces, and crashing to the ground. The P47 hit the ground in a tight spiral, exploding when it hit the ground." The collision occurs ~5 miles NE of Bruning AAF. The fighter pilot is KWF. The B-17, of the 224th AAF Base Unit, out of Sioux City Army Air Base, Iowa, was part of a formation of bombers on a camera-gunnery mission, en route to Bruning AAF, which was flying in several elements. The fighter struck the wing man of the second element of the low formation. Only four crew of ten aboard the B-17 manage to bail out. Killed are 2d Lts. William F. Washburn, and Bernard I. Hall, pilot and co-pilot, F/O George A. Budovsky, Cpl. John E. Tuchols, and Pvt. Henry C. Sedberry. Surviving are Cpls. LeNoir A. Greer (minor injuries), and Walter A. Divan (major injuries), Pvt. Albert L. Mikels (minor injuries), and Pfc. Reuben L. Larson (minor injuries). "It is the opinion of the Aircraft Accident Investigating Committee that responsibility for the accident is 100% pilot error on the part of the pilot of the P47, in that poor judgement and poor technique was used in 'breaking-off'." A Nebraska historical marker for the accident was erected in 2010 by the Milligan Memorial Committee for the World War II Fatal Air Crashes near Milligan, Nebraska.

13 September
The first Supermarine Spiteful prototype, NN660, a converted Spitfire XIV, first flown 30 June 1944, returning from flight from the A&AEE, Boscombe Down, crashes this date while in unplanned mock combat with a Spitfire at low altitude, killing test pilot Frank Furlong. No reason for the loss is officially established, although after an incident that happened to him, Jeffrey Quill suggests it may have been due to the Spiteful's aileron control rods sticking – previous Sptifires had used cables. Control rods are checked for binding in all future Spitefuls and the problem does not re-occur. Quill had chosen Furlong for his test team after they had flown together during the Battle of Britain.
14 September
Douglas SBD-4 Dauntless, BuNo 10575, 'B-16', crashes off bow of USS Sable during flight operations on Lake Michigan at 1001 hrs. Pilot Ensign Albert Grey O'Dell, A-V(N), USNR, recovered by U.S. Coast Guard 83-foot Wooden Patrol Boat WPB-83476 at 1003, brought back aboard Sable at 1013. Pilot suffers minor contusion of right shoulder, "numerous jagged lacerations of the face, chin and forehead." Airframe rediscovered on 11 April 1989 by A&T Recovery of Chicago, Illinois, and recovered 26 August 1991 on behalf of the National Museum of Naval Aviation and brought initially to Crowley's Yacht Yard for disassembly and shipment for restoration. After restoration it is displayed for a time at the National Museum of the United States Air Force, Dayton, Ohio, marked as a USAAF A-24 Banshee. It is now on display in Concourse C at Chicago Midway International Airport, marked as the SBD, 'B-3', flown by Ensign Frederick Thomas Weber (1916–1942) of VB-6, USS Enterprise, at the Battle of Midway. Credited with a bomb hit on the Japanese carrier Hiryū, he was killed in action, and awarded the Navy Cross.

15 September
A U.S. Army Air Force Consolidated TB-24J Liberator, 42-50890, (built as a B-24J-5-FO, and converted), of the 3007th AAF Base Unit, Kirtland Field, piloted by Warren E. Crowther, en route from Bakersfield, California, to Kirtland Field, New Mexico, and off-course, crashed into a boulder field near the top of Humphreys Peak, 10 miles N of Flagstaff, Arizona, at approx. 0330 hrs. All eight crew members were killed. The location is nearly inaccessible and has been left mostly as-is.

18 September
Second Folland Fo.108, P1775, 'P', one of only twelve built by newly founded Folland company, as dedicated engine-testbed type, specification 43/37, crashes this date. Of the twelve, five were lost in accidents, including three in a 21-day period in August and September 1944, giving rise to the nickname, the Folland "Frightener".
19 September
RAF Douglas Dakota Mk. III, KG374, c/n 12383, (ex-USAAF C-47A-DK, 42-92568), 'YS-DM', of 271 Squadron, RAF Down Ampney, Gloucester, piloted by F/Lt. David S. Lord, is hit by AAA in starboard engine while on resupply mission for beleaguered troops at Arnhem during Operation Market Garden. Despite fire spreading to whole of starboard wing, pilot spends ten minutes making two passes over very small dropzone (which, unbeknownst to the crew, had been overrun by German forces) to drop eight ammunition panniers. Just after last one has been dropped, fuel tank explodes, tearing off wing, only navigator F/O Harry A. King escaping from stricken aircraft and descending by parachute to be captured as a POW the following morning, spending the rest of the war in Stalag Luft I at Barth. KWF are pilot Lord, second pilot P/O R. E. H. "Dickie" Medhurst (son of Air Chief Marshal Sir Charles Medhurst), wireless operator F/O Alec F. Ballantyne, and four air despatchers of 223 Company RASC, Cpl. P. Nixon, Dvr. A. Rowbotham, Dvr. J. Ricketts and Dvr. L. Harper. Following release of King from prison camp, full details of the action become known and pilot Lord receives posthumous Victoria Cross on 13 November 1945, the only VC awarded to any member of Transport Command during the Second World War. In May 1949 the Dutch Government awards Harry King the Netherlands Bronze Cross.
19 September
Consolidated B-32-1-CF Dominator, 42-108472, first B-32 delivered, on this date, written off the very same day when nosewheel collapsed on landing.
30 September
Grumman F6F-3 Hellcat, BuNo. 42782, lost 125 miles (201 km) SE of Nantucket Island, Massachusetts during carrier qualifications. Pilot's name/fate unknown. Located by submarine DSV Alvin, 24 September 1968.
October
The Lavochkin La-7, which entered combat testing in September, suffers from a batch of flawed wings and causes six accidents, four of them fatal, which causes the fighter to be grounded until the cause is determined to be a defect in the wing spar.
October
First prototype of two Lavochkin La-7R (Raketny – 'Rocket') conversions from standard production La-7 with rear fuselage and lower rudder cut-away to accommodate RD-1 kHz auxiliary rocket motor designed by S. P. Korolev and V. P. Glushko, to counter threat of high-altitude Luftwaffe attacks against the Soviet capital, attempts first test flight after protracted ground trials. During the take-off run, however, a fuel pipe fails, the rocket motor explodes, and the airframe catches fire, test pilot Georgi M. Shiyanov bailing out. Shiyanov continues test programme with second prototype, and experiences close call on another flight when the nitric acid and kerosene-fuelled rocket explodes during a relight, destroying almost all the elevator surface, and 75 percent of the rudder, but he skillfully lands the damaged airframe, and it is repaired.
2 October
A B-25D Mitchell bomber, 41-30114, crashes in the Mojave Desert while on a pilot training mission. The plane stalls, spins and crashes into the ground, killing pilot 1st Lt George D. Rosado, copilot WASP Marie Michell Robinson, and crew chief S/Sgt Gordon L. Walker.
5 October
Oberstleutnant Helmut Lent, night fighter ace (110 victories), and the first of only two night fighters to receive the Knight's Cross of the Iron Cross with Oak Leaves, Swords and Diamonds (Ritterkreuz des Eisernen Kreuzes mit Eichenlaub, Schwertern und Brillanten), crashes in a Junkers Ju 88 on a routine transit flight from Stade to Nordborchen, 5 kilometres (3 mi) south of Paderborn. On the landing approach one of the engines cuts out and the plane collides with power lines. All four members of the crew are mortally injured. Three men die shortly after the crash and Lent succumbs to his injuries two days later on 7 October 1944. Lent is posthumously promoted to Oberst.
6 October
Junkers Ju 90, G6+AY, blows two tires and crashes on landing at Tatoi Airport, Greece, after flight from Iraklion, Crete. Repairs prove impossible and the aircraft is set on fire by the crew to prevent capture by the British, who are about to occupy Greece.
8 October
Focke-Wulf Fw 190 V18/U1, Werke Nummer 0040, originally Fw 190A-0, (utilized by Daimler-Benz for engine tests with Hirth exhaust turbine), is rebuilt a second time to Fw 190C standard as Fw 190 V18/U2 with 1,750 hp (1,300 kW) Daimler-Benz DB 603A engine replaced by 1,750 hp (1,300 kW) Jumo 213E. Aircraft, prototype for Ta 152H-1, crashes this date on test flight out of Langenhagen after just a few days in its new configuration.
10 October
Fisher P-75A-GC Eagle, 44-44549, crashes on flight test out of Eglin Field, Florida, when propellers apparently run out of oil, pilot Maj. Harold Bolster attempts dead-stick landing but crashes short on approach and dies.

15 October
A U.S. Navy plane, thought to be from NAAS North Bend, Oregon, crashes into a residential district of the small western Oregon town of Coquille, killing three crew, and injuring five civilians, including an infant, one possibly fatally. The plane sheared off the chimney of one house and crashed into several others on a street near Coquille High School.

17 October
U.S. Navy K-class blimp K-111, of Airship Squadron 33, operating from NAAF Del Mar, California, becomes lost in fog, strikes a hill above Avalon on Catalina Island, California, burns, five crew dying immediately and a sixth succumbing in hospital the next day. Four survivors, all with injuries.

17 October
The U.S. Navy in San Diego announces on 19 October that 13 were killed when Consolidated PB2Y-3 Coronado, BuNo 7051, crashed into a mountain on Los Coronadoes Island, 20 miles off the Southern California coast. Flying boat was of VPB-13, FAW-1, pilot was Lieutenant Robert D. Cullinane. Aircraft crashed on South Coronado, southernmost of the four islands.

18 October
A United States Army Air Forces Consolidated B-24H-20-CF Liberator, 42-50347 broke up in mid air over the town of Birkenhead, England. The aircraft was on a flight from New York to Liverpool and the accident killed all 24 airmen on board the aircraft. The aircraft was at 6,000 feet when it broke into three pieces. "Parts of the bomber narrowly missed persons who rushed from their homes at the sound of the explosion."

19 October
En route to the Gulf of Paria, off Trinidad, Ensign T. J. Connors, A-V(N), USNR, of VF-67, crashes in a Grumman F6F Hellcat, astern of USS Bennington, while making a strafing run on a towed target sled. "Search results were negative." This was the Bennington's shakedown cruise.

19 October
Two Grumman F6F-5N Hellcats, of the Night Fighter Training Unit, depart Naval Auxiliary Air Station Charlestown, Rhode Island, for a night pursuit training mission, piloted by Ensign George K. Kraus, 22, of Wisconsin and Ensign Merle H. Longnecker, 20, of North Dakota. "Longnecker was the pursuing plane, and sent the radio message 'Splash,' indicating he was close enough to Kraus' plane for an attack. That was the last message heard, as the planes apparently collided over the Laurel Hill section of Norwich and crashed about a quarter mile apart in the woods of the" Norwich State Hospital property. "Fire and rescue crews raced to the scene, where the crash sparked a small forest fire. Navy crews from an auxiliary base in Groton secured the site and recovered the bodies the next day.

20 October
Lockheed YP-80A-LO Shooting Star, 44-83025, c/n 080-1004, crashes at Burbank, California, coming down one mile W of the Lockheed terminal, after main fuel pump failure, killing Lockheed test pilot Milo Burcham.

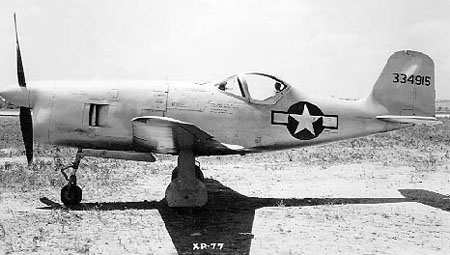
Second XP-77 prototype, 43-34916, which was lost during Air Proving Ground tests on 22 October 1944, at Eglin Field, Florida.

22 October
Second of only two Bell XP-77-BE lightweight fighters completed out of a contract for six, 43-34916, crashes when pilot attempts an Immelmann turn resulting in an inverted spin during testing at the Air Proving Ground, Eglin Field, Florida. Pilot Barney E. Turner bails out.

24 October
Crew of U.S. Navy Consolidated PB4Y-2 Privateer, BuNo 59394, of VPB-106, out of NAAS Camp Kearney, California, on a long-range training mission, becomes lost in bad weather, runs out of fuel, and ditches in the Gulf of California, eleven crew, two female Marines, and the squadron canine mascot all evacuating the bomber as it rapidly sinks. "SAN DIEGO, Oct. 30 (AP) – How two women marines and 11 crew members of a Navy Liberator bomber which crashed at sea existed for four days in Robinson Crusoe style on a deserted island near the eastern coast of Baja California before being rescued by Mexican fishermen was disclosed today by the Navy. The bomber sank almost immediately after making a crash landing late Tuesday night, but the crew was able to salvage a small six-man life raft. So crowded was the raft that some of the men were forced to swim to give more room for the two women – Pfc. Helen L. Breckel, 21, Cincinnati, and Pfc. Edna H. Shaughnessy, 28, Manchester, N.H. The party existed on clams and raw fish while on the island, 330 miles southeast of here. A fishing boat sighted them Saturday and took them to Bahia de Los Angeles and a Coast Guard plane returned them here yesterday."

26 October
WASP pilot Gertrude Tompkins Silver of the 601st Ferrying Squadron, 5th Ferrying Group, Love Field, Dallas, Texas, departs Mines Field, Los Angeles, California, in North American P-51D-15-NA Mustang, 44-15669, at 1600 hrs PWT, headed for the East Coast. She took off into the wind, into an offshore fog bank, and was expected that night at Palm Springs. She never arrived. Due to a paperwork foul-up, a search did not get under way for several days, and while the eventual search of land and sea was massive, it failed to find a trace of Silver or her plane. She is the only missing WASP pilot. She had married Sgt. Henry Silver one month before her disappearance.
26 October
Sole Platt-LePage XR-1A helicopter, 42-6581, is damaged in an accident at Wright Field, Ohio, due to the failure of a pinion bearing support in the starboard rotor hub and is shipped back to the manufacturer. It will be declared surplus following the end of World War II.

4 November
"A Navy ensign was killed, twelfth district headquarters announced today (4 November), as he attempted to parachute from his plane over the Fallon, Nev., auxiliary air base. The engine of the Hellcat fighter failed just over the field. As the ensign jumped he hit the plane and was rendered unconscious before his ‘chute opened."

6 November
U.S. Navy Douglas R4D-5, BuNo 39063, c/n 9941, built as a USAAF C-47A-40-DL, 42-24079, and transferred to the Navy, collides with Goodyear FG-1A Corsair, BuNo 13334, and crashes into the St. Johns River near Naval Air Station Jacksonville, Florida. All 18 on both planes killed.

8 November
"NORFOLK, Va., Nov. 8 (UP) – A Navy plane crashed off Old Point Comfort and the Navy reported that the 13 men aboard were either dead or missing."

10 November
"Clovis, N.M., Nov. 12 (UP) – Six officers and nine enlisted men were killed Friday night when a four-engined bomber crashed and burned about 25 miles southeast of the Clovis Army air field." Boeing B-29A-1-BN Superfortress, 42-93832, c/n 7329, delivered to the USAAF 15 April 1944, assigned to the Combat Crew Training Squadron, 234th Army Air Force Base Unit, Clovis AAF, piloted by Thomas R. Opie, is listed by two sources as having crashed approximately 25 miles NE of the airfield, at variance with the initial United Press report.

10 November
Famed Consolidated B-24J-1-CO Liberator, 42-72994, "Bolivar", of the 30th Bomb Group, sent home from the Pacific after 81 missions with three different crews for a war bond tour, crash lands near Vultee Field, the base for Vultee Aircraft in Downey, California, and never flies again. One crew member suffers a broken leg.

11 November
A court-martialed former U.S. Army Air Force officer escapes from the Craig Field, Alabama, guardhouse, steals North American AT-6A-NA Texan, 41-488, c/n 77-4517, of the 2138th AAF Base Unit, flies to Louisiana, and bails out E of New Orleans, the unmanned trainer coming down early on 12 November near the former Micheaud Airport, where Higgins Industries had constructed a war plant. "NEW ORLEANS, Nov. 13, (AP) – Robert G. Kaslow, former Army Air Corps officer, who escaped from the Craig field, Ala., guardhouse Friday night and fled in an Army plane, was captured here tonight by F.B.I. agents. The assistant special agent in charge of the New Orleans F.B.I. office, Zack J. Van Landingham, announced that Kaslow, 21, of Johnson City, N.Y., who was serving a 30-year sentence at the Alabama field for violations of the articles of war, was taken in custody at 5 p.m. in the cocktail lounge of a New Orleans hotel. Van Landingham said Kaslow was dressed in the full uniform of a second lieutenant in the U.S. Air Corps and was accompanied by 'a New Orleans girl whom he had known approximately one year.' The agent said the girl was being held for questioning but he declined to identify her. He said she was about 25 years old. The plane in which the flier was said by Craig field officers to have escaped crashed Saturday at Higgins airport near here. It was unoccupied. Van Landingham said Kaslow told F.B.I. men he parachuted from the plane at 5,000 feet above a swamp near here and made his way into the city on foot. Kaslow was arrested last March for stealing $1,500 and an automobile from a fellow officer at Craig field. He escaped from the guardhouse and was retaken in Santa Monica, California, after a gun battle with police. His court-martial and sentence followed." "Kaslow was arrested last night in a hotel cocktail lounge with an unidentified young woman, who was released by FBI agents today. An unusual 'V' ring worn by the 25 year old brunette companion furnished the principal clue for FBI agents who trailed them from one night spot to another. Tracing the flyer's movements from the swamp in which he landed, the FBI said he tied pieces of his parachute about his feet and legs, as he had been taught in his military training, and hiked across the marshlands. He swam several canals and spent one night in a lean-to he constructed by a waterway." Two sources give this aircraft's crash location as Orlando, Florida, but this is clearly incompatible with the details of Kaslow's flight and arrest. Kaslow was found guilty of violating eight articles of war by another court- martial and sent to the Atlanta Penitentiary with a 30-year sentence. An appeal filed by Kaslow (Robert G. Kaslow, v. William H. Hiatt, Warden, United States Penitentiary, Atlanta, Georgia, 181 F.2d 93) was rejected on 20 April 1950, when the U.S. Court of Appeals for the Fifth Circuit affirmed the judgement of the lower court.

11 November
"Los Angeles, Nov. 12 (AP) – Sheriff's deputies and Army rescuers climbed rain-sodden, mountainous terrain tonight endeavoring to reach the wreckage of an Army twin-engine cargo plane which crashed late last night against Strawberry peak, in the Mt. Wilson area. Army officials said 13 persons, all military personnel, were aboard. The plane, en route from St. Joseph, Mo., to Mines field here, last reported by radio to Bakersfield about 8 p.m. yesterday. Flight officer Earl L. Olson of the air transport command's sixth ferrying group sighted the wreckage today. An Army spokesman said it had not been determined if any of the passengers survived." Douglas C-47B-1-DL Skytrain, 43-16143, c/n 20609, assigned to the 561st Base Unit, Rosecrans Field, Missouri, was piloted by Rae C. Kelly. Joe Baugher states that the aircraft was en route from Hamilton Field, San Rafael, California, when it crashed in Wildcat Gulch, in heavy clouds. Twelve killed, one survived. Follow-up coverage by the Associated Press, noted that two injured men were rescued from the site, PM 3/c Buford Chism, and Cpl. Kenneth Bedford, home towns not listed, who were taken to the Pasadena area Army hospital. "Not all the 11 victims died instantly when the plane struck the peak, rebounded and disintegrated, scattering bodies and wreckage in Wildcat canyon in the Mt. Wilson area. 'We heard one man, somewhere down in the canyon, crying for help during the night,' rescuers quoted the sailor. 'We tried to locate and help him, but in our condition we couldn't get down there. We heard him dying.' Deputies said the sailor had disregarded his own injuries to minister to the Negro soldier, more seriously hurt. The dead, they added, included three Majors and several Navy men." An Army nurse was among the victims.

12 November
Douglas C-54A-1-DO Skymaster, 42-107427, c/n 7446/DO 54, of Air Transport Command, strikes the side of a mountain near Cape St. George on the southwestern tip of Port au Port Peninsula, Newfoundland, ~30 miles W of Ernest Harmon Field where it was due to land. "Harmon Field, Newfoundland, Nov. 14 (AP) – Army officials announced today that nine persons were killed and nine others injured in a crash Sunday of an army transport plane against the side of a mountain 30 miles west of the air transport command base here. Army officials said the plane was en route overseas and had left LaGuardia field, N.Y., late Saturday night. It was operated by a commercial airline under contract to the army. E. C. Watkins, pilot, of Long Island, N.Y., was killed, as were four others of the civilian crew of six. Four of the dead and all of the injured were servicemen. The crash occurred shortly after 1:28 a. m. Sunday morning after the plane had reported by radio to the Harmon field tower preparatory to landing. The plane was discovered about five hours later by searching planes near the tip of the Port au Port peninsula. The army announcement said operations officers reported visibility was good at the time of the crash, but added that a heavy southeasterly wind was blowing." The Aviation Archeology site lists the pilot as Edwin C. Watkins.

13 November
Douglas C-47-DL Skytrain, 41-7834, c/n 4333, crashes three miles NW of Casper Army Air Base, Wyoming, shortly after takeoff, killing four Army officers, two Marines, a sailor, a WAVE, and three soldiers. Airframe SOC on 14 November 1944. The Aviation Archaeological Investigation and Research website lists the pilot as Sig O. Owens, and the aircraft as assigned to the 7th Ferrying Squadron, at Gore Field, Montana; however, that unit and base assignment ended when the 7th Ferrying Squadron disbanded on 1 April 1944.

13 November
"March Field, Nov. 13 (UP) – Six crew men were killed here today when a twin-engined medium bomber crashed near the barracks area, narrowly missing two dormitory buildings which were slightly damaged when the plane burst into flame. Occupants of the barracks escaped injury. The plane had last taken off from Coolidge field, Ariz., Col. Leroy A. Walthall, base commandant, said, but he was unable to disclose its home base." North American B-25J-20/22-NC Mitchell, 44-29665, of the 5053d AAF Base Unit, Mather Field, California, piloted by George F. Tobola, spun in.

14 November
RAF Air Chief Marshal Sir Trafford Leigh-Mallory, his wife Dora, and eight aircrew are killed when Avro 685 York Mk. C.I, MW126, strikes ridge at the 6,300-foot (1,900 m) level in the French Alps between Belledonne and Seven Lakes Mountains, 30 miles (48 km) S of Grenoble, France, in a blizzard. Wreckage found by a villager in June 1945. Leigh-Mallory, originator of the "Big Wing" concept during the Battle of Britain, and younger brother of Everest mountaineer George Mallory, was en route to his new posting in Ceylon where he was to take over command of Allied air operations in South East Asia Command.
22 November
Consolidated PB4Y-2 Privateer, BuNo 59544, on pre-delivery test flight by company crew out of Lindbergh Field, San Diego, California, takes off at 1223 hrs., loses port outer wing on climb-out, crashes one quarter mile further on in ravine in undeveloped area of Loma Portal near the Navy Training Center, less than two miles (3 km) from point of lift-off. All crew killed, including pilot Marvin R. Weller, co-pilot Conrad C. Cappe, flight engineers Frank D. Sands and Clifford P. Bengston, radio operator Robert B. Skala, and Consolidated Vultee field operations employee Ray Estes. Wing panel comes down on home at 3121 Kingsley Street in Loma Portal. Cause is found to be 98 missing bolts, wing only attached with four spar bolts. Four employees who either were responsible for installation, or who had been inspectors who signed off on the undone work, are fired two days later. San Diego coroner's jury finds Consolidated Vultee guilty of "gross negligence" by vote of 11–1 on 5 January 1945, Bureau of Aeronautics reduces contract by one at a cost to firm of $155,000. Consolidated Vultee pays out $130,484 to families of six dead crew.

26 November
Leith Hill multiple aircraft accident, three United States Air Force Douglas C-47A-30-DKs crashed into the side of Leith Hill after having to descend from 1,500 feet to 1,000 feet due to low clouds, killing all 13 crewmen.

27 November
During a 3,000-mile out-and-back navigation training mission from Great Bend Army Airfield Great Bend Army Airfield, Kansas, to Batista Army Airfield, Cuba, Boeing B-29-25-BW Superfortress, 42-24447, coded '35', of the 28th Bombardment Squadron (Very Heavy), 19th Bombardment Group (Very Heavy), suffers fire in number 1 (port outer) engine. Aircraft commander, 1st Lt. Eugene Hammond, orders crew bail-out 37 miles S of Biloxi, Mississippi. After all but pilot have departed, the burning engine nacelle drops off of the wing, Lt. Hammond returns to controls, brings the bomber into Keesler Field, Mississippi for emergency landing. Only four recovered from the Gulf of Mexico, one dead, three injured.

29 November
Douglas A-26 Invader, A-26B-10-DT 43-22298 and A-26B-15-DT 43-22336 both of 641st Squadron USAF collided during formation after take-off from Warton Aerodrome Lancashire. All crew were killed. Both aircraft remained on Freckleton Marsh and were partially recovered as part of a UK Channel 4 Time Team Programme in 2005.

30 November
Two B-24 Liberator bombers, flying out of Davis-Monthan Army Air Base, collide at 0740 hrs. over the desert NE of Tucson, Arizona. The planes were on a training mission and all eighteen airmen died. The location of this crash was over a major natural drainage canal known as the Pantano Wash, at a point half-way between present day East Broadway and East Speedway. Aircraft involved were both B-24J-35-CO Liberators, 42-73344 and 42-73357, of the 233d Combat Crew Training Squadron. Harold D. Ballard piloted 344, while 357 was flown by Theodore V. Glock.
5 December
British Douglas Dakota III, FL588, of the Royal Air Force crashed on the Pic de la Camisette, a mountain close to the commune of Mijanès, Ariège, in the French Pyrenees.
The Dakota was piloted by three RAF pilots. In total twenty-three airmen were on board, including twenty members of the Glider Pilot Regiment. Only six airmen survived the incident; sixteen died in the crash, another died within hours from his injuries. In spite of serious wounds, two of the survivors managed to reach the village of Mijanès to get help for the other survivors.

The bodies of eleven men were recovered from the crash site between 10 and 19 December, and buried in Mijanès. The search was suspended due to adverse weather conditions, but in the spring of 1945 a further six bodies were brought down from the crash site after the snow had melted. All of the airmen who died in the crash were later reburied in the Mazargues War Cemetery, Marseille. Remains of Dakota FL588 have been preserved and today are on display at the Château d'Usson, a ruined medieval Castle noted for its association with the Cathars.
6 December
Lockheed XF-14 Shooting Star, 44-83024, c/n 080-1003, originally YP-80A No 2, redesignated during production, of the 4144th Base Unit, destroyed in mid-air collision with B-25J-20-NC, 44-29120, of the 421st Base Unit, near Muroc Army Air Base, California. All crew on both planes killed, coming down 7 miles SSW of Randsburg, California. XF-14 pilot was Perry B. Claypool, while Henry M. Phillips flew the B-25.
6 December
First prototype Heinkel He 162 V1 Spatz (sparrow, Heinkel factory name for design), or "Volksjager" ("Peoples' Fighter"), loses wheel-well doors on first flight at Schwechat, by company test pilot Flugkapitän Gotthard Peter, due to improper bonding. Nonetheless, flight testing is not delayed for a thorough inspection, and on another flight in front of German high brass by Peter on 10 December, V1 starboard wing comes apart in high-speed, low-level pass, killing pilot. The wing appeared to split and "the upper skinning began to roll back like a carpet." Starboard aileron breaks away, taking part of wingtip with it, followed by failure of wing's leading edge. Aircraft corkscrews down and crashes on the perimeter of the airfield. Cause was defective wing bonding. Adhesive used, Dynamit, was substitute for Tego film glue used previously, but factory producing it was destroyed in RAF attack on Wuppertal. Substitute glue problem causing structural failure also affected Focke-Wulf Ta 154 and other late-war German aviation projects depending on bonded wooden components.
7 December
The sole Northrop JB-1A Bat, unofficially known as the "Thunderbug" due to the improvised General Electric B-1 turbojets' "peculiar squeal", a jet-propelled flying wing spanning 28 feet 4 inches (8.64 m) to carry 2,000 lb (910 kg). bombs in pods close to the engines, makes its first powered, but unmanned, flight from Santa Rosa Island, Eglin Field, Florida, launching from a pair of rails laid across the sand dunes. It climbs rapidly, stalls, and crashes 400 yards from the launch point.
11 December
The sole Grumman XF5F-1 Skyrocket, BuNo 1442, is written off after a gear-up landing, this date.
15 December
A Noorduyn UC-64A Norseman, 44-70285, c/n 550, disappeared over the English Channel with Maj. Glenn Miller, pilot John Morgan and Lt. Col. Norman Baessell on board after departing RAF Twinwood Farm, Clapham, Bedfordshire, England. Missing Air Crew Report (MACR) 10770. It is believed that the plane was lost by straying into a forbidden zone in mid-channel which was designated for the jettisoning of surplus ordnance. On that day, a squadron of RAF Lancasters had aborted a mission and were salvoing their bombloads in this zone. One crewman, a navigator, claims to have looked down and seen a Norseman flying low over the water. Before he could draw any attention to this, the Norseman was apparently overwhelmed by bomb splashes and disappeared. Other conspiracy theories about the disappearance have also been advanced.
15 December
Douglas A-26 Invader 43-22424 disappeared without a trace during a routine transfer flight. The plane was slated to be assigned to the 47th Bomb Group and was en route to Grosseto, Italy. US planes set to Italy left from Florida to Belem, Brazil, then from Belem to Natal, Brazil. After Natal, the planes would fly across the Atlantic to North Africa, and then on to Italy. This plane departed Belem on 15 December at 15:34 Greenwich mean time and was never heard from again. According to the Missing Air Crew Report (MACR), the plane did not reach the first check-in post at Sao Luis, Brazil, which gives rise to the idea that whatever happened to this plane occurred within the first hour of flight. The MACR file was generated by a letter to the Commanding Officer of the 6th Ferry Group dated 7 March 1945 inquiring about the status of the plane and the three crewmembers aboard, in particular, Sgt. Norman Robert "Bob" Smith, who was the engineer-gunner. Also aboard were pilot 1st Lt. Charles A. Grimes, and navigator 1st Lt. Laverne Gaylord Dingwell. The official response detailed in MACR 14085 states the Accident Review Board at Belem Air Station had no idea what happened to the plane and believe that it may have crashed in the "impenetrable jungle" near the base. To this date, no wreckage or bodies have ever been recovered. The Invader Historical Foundation hypothesizes that the two most likely causes for the disappearance are an engine failure or a mid-air explosion caused by the long-range fuel tank aboard the plane.
17–18 December
While U.S. Navy Task Force 38 attempts to refuel in the eastern half of the Philippine Sea between operations against Japanese airfields on Luzon, Third Fleet encounters a newly-formed, deceptively small, but extremely violent typhoon, of which it has virtually no warning. TF 38 is operating with seven Essex-class carriers and six light carriers, while the refueling group has five escort carriers with replacement planes. By 1500 on 17 December it becomes too rough for the escort carriers to recover CAP and in two fighters, waved off from their respective decks, the pilots are directed to bail out with rescue by a destroyer. In the storm the fleet carriers lose no planes, although seas are so heavy that Hancock's flight deck, 57 feet above waterline, scoops up green water. On the light carriers, plane lashings part on hangar decks and padeyes are pulled out of flight decks.

"Planes went adrift, collided and burst into flames. Monterey caught fire at 0911 (18 December) and lost steerageway a few minutes later. The fire, miraculously, was brought under control at 0945, and the C.O., Captain Stuart H. Ingersoll, wisely decided to let his ship lie dead in the water until temporary repairs could be effected. She lost 18 aircraft burned in the hangar deck or blown overboard and 16 seriously damaged, together with three 20-mm guns, and suffered extensive rupturing of her ventilation system. Cowpens lost 7 planes overboard and caught fire from one that broke loose at 1051, but the fire was brought under control promptly; Langley rolled through 70 degrees; San Jacinto reported a fighter plane adrift on the hangar deck which wrecked seven other aircraft. She also suffered damage from salt water that entered through punctures in the ventilating ducts."

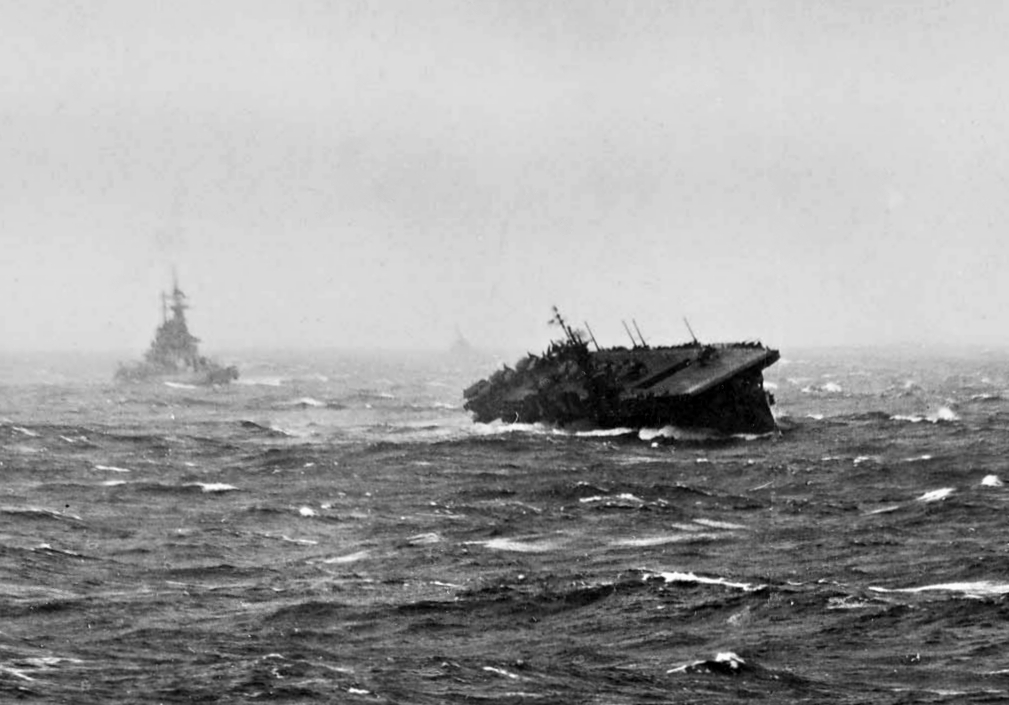
USS Langley (CVL-27) rolling heavily during Typhoon Cobra, 18 December 1944.

"Captain [Jasper T.] Acuff's replenishment escort carriers did pretty well. Flames broke out on the flight deck of Cape Esperance at 1228 but were overcome; Kwajalein made a maximum roll of 39 degrees to port when hove-to with wind abeam. Her port catwalks scooped up green water, but she lost only three planes which were jettisoned from the flight deck; it took one hour to get them over the side. Three other escort carriers lost in all 86 aircraft but came through without much material damage."

Total aircraft losses in the Fleet, including those blown overboard or jettisoned from the battleships and cruisers, amounted to 146. Three destroyers, unfueled and unballasted, were lost – Hull. Monaghan, and Spence.

19 December
2nd Lt. Robin C. Pennington of VMF-914 out of MCAS Cherry Point, North Carolina, is killed in the crash of Brewster F3A-1 Corsair, BuNo 04634, 'L69', while on a GCI training mission to intercept a North American PBJ Mitchell, his fighter coming down in the Croatan National Forest, adjoining the air field to the west, about 1/4 mile E of Great Lake, striking the ground left wing low. Privately recovered in 1990, there then follows a legal battle with the National Museum of Naval Aviation in 1994 which tries to lay claim to the rare Brewster-produced model (only 735 versus the 12,571 built by Vought) which is only finally resolved in the private individual's favour by an Act of the U.S. Congress in 2005.

21 December
South African Air Force Douglas DC-3, KG498, crashed into a hill during low visibility near Torrettoria, Italy. 22 killed and one injured.

24 December
Fleet Air Arm Eastern Aircraft Martlet V, JV482, '6C', of 882 Naval Air Squadron, flown by S/Lt.(A) Peter Lock on a practice bombing sortie at Lough Neagh suffers engine fire forcing pilot to ditch in Portmore Lough. Pilot survives but aircraft is deemed irrecoverable. On 30 April 1984, the airframe is recovered by the Ulster Aviation Society, lifted by a Westland Lynx, XZ665, of 665 Squadron AAC, for eventual restoration.

24 December
Christmas eve crash of Douglas A-26B-10-DT Invader, 43-22273, c/n 18420, of the 381st CCTS, Marianna Army Airfield, Florida, piloted by Benjamin F. Schoenfield, five miles S of Sardinia, Ohio, kills three crew and injures one.

25 December
Ten die and 17 are injured as Douglas C-47A-10-DL Skytrain, 42-23360, c/n 9222, hits fog-shrouded Roundtop mountain, five miles SE of Harrisburg, Pennsylvania. The fire department from New Cumberland, called by a local resident who reports a fire in the woods, arrives shortly after 0500 hrs., and has to cut survivors out of the wreckage with an ax. Some bodies had been thrown clear. "Fifteen of the injured, suffering fractures and burns, were brought to the Harrisburg General hospital, and the other two were taken to a New Cumberland army hospital."

25 December
The crash of a U.S. Navy Douglas R4D-6 Skytrain of VRF-3, Naval Air Station Olathe, Kansas, piloted by W. H. Beck, in an Indianapolis, Indiana, suburb kills five and injures two. "The plane was bound for Columbus, O., after being turned back at St. Louis, Mo., on a flight to Olathe, Kas., naval air base. Everett Maxwell, Marion county deputy sheriff, said five bodies were removed from the wreckage. He reported the craft was apparently attempting to land at the municipal airport and overshot the field in a fog. It struck a tree as the pilot tried to pull up, Maxwell said. Three of the men killed in the crash were navy personnel attached to naval air transport squadron 3 with headquarters at the Olathe base. Others involved were army personnel."

28 December
At 1151 hours, FM-2 Wildcat, BuNo. 57039, out of Naval Air Station Glenview, Illinois, crashes into Lake Michigan in about 200 feet of water. The pilot was Ensign William E. Forbes. Ensign Forbes was in the process of making his third take-off of his aircraft carrier qualification off the USS Sable. Apparently the engine checked out okay. However, on the take-off roll the engine began to "pop" and then "quit completely." The fighter rolled off the bow of the ship and sank. The accident was determined to be 100 percent material (engine failure). The National Museum of Naval Aviation at Naval Air Station Pensacola plans to recover the airframe in December 2012.

== See also ==
- List of accidents and incidents involving military aircraft

== Bibliography ==
- Martin, Bernard. The Viking, Valetta and Varsity. Tonbridge, Kent, UK: Air-Britain (Historians) Ltd., 1975. ISBN 978-0-85130-038-2.
- Bodie, Warren M. (1991). The Lockheed P-38 Lightning. Hayesville, North Carolina: Widewing Publications. pp. 72–167. ISBN 978-0-9629359-5-4.
- Morison, Samuel Eliot (1981) [1953]. New Guinea and the Marianas, March 1944–August 1944. History of United States Naval Operations in World War II. Vol. VIII. Boston: Little, Brown and Company. OCLC 10926173.
