= 34th Aeromedical Evacuation Squadron =

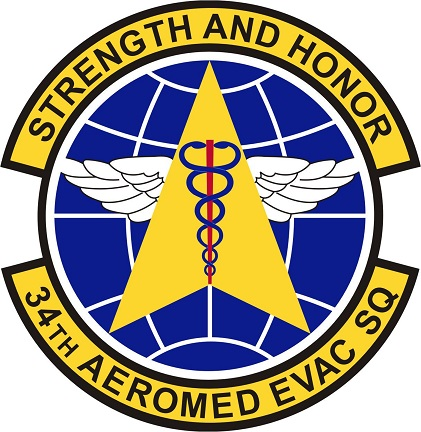
- Active: 1959-1994, 2008-present
- Country: United States
- Branch: United States Air Force
- Role: Aeromedical evacuation
- Part of: Air Force Reserve Command
- Garrison/HQ: Peterson SFB, Colorado
- Motto: 3P – Personnel + Pride = Performance

Commanders
- Current commander: Lt Col Matthew Grimes

Insignia
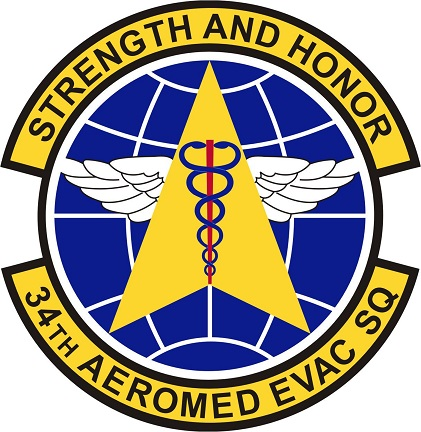
- 34th Aeromedical Evacuation Squadron emblem

The 34th Aeromedical Evacuation Squadron is a unit of the United States Air Force. It is part of the 302d Airlift Wing at Peterson Space Force Base, Colorado. It is a component of the Air Force Reserve Command of the United States Air Force, and is part of the air force component of United States Transportation Command.

== Mission ==
The squadron provides tactical aeromedical evacuation for U.S. troops and regional Unified Commands using [[[Lockheed C-130 Hercules]] and other aircraft. The unit is composed of flight nurses, Medical Service Corps officers, aeromedical evacuation technicians, medical administration and logistics technicians, and radio and communications operators.

== History ==
The 34th AES was activated in 1959 at Brooks Air Force Base, Texas as part of the 433d Troop Carrier Wing which operated the Fairchild C-119 Flying Boxcar. The following year due to the closure of the Brooks airfield the 433d and its associated units moved a short distance west to Kelly Air Force Base, in 1966 the flying mission converted to the Douglas C-124 Globemaster II transport. From 1968 to 1969 the 34th was activated to federal service and assigned to Yokota Air Base, Japan where its members augmented aeromedical evacuation missions flown on the C-141 "Starlifter" flying wounded out of South Vietnam and on to the continental U.S.

In 1971 the mission changed to tactical air evac when the parent unit converted to the Lockheed C-130 Hercules, in 1976 the squadron became part of the newly activated 32d Aeromedical Evacuation Group. The 34th provide air evac support for U.S. military forces during Operation Just Cause in 1989 and was activated again in 1991 for Operation Desert Storm. As a result of new Air Force regulations in 1994 the unit was redesignated the 433d AES, in 2008 the 34th was brought back under the 302d Airlift Wing at Peterson Space Force Base, Colorado.

== Lineage ==
- Constituted as the 34th Aeromedical Evacuation Squadron on 18 February 1959

Activated on 15 April 1959
Redesignated 34th Aeromedical Evacuation Flight on 23 April 1971
Redesignated 34th Aeromedical Evacuation Squadron on 15 August 1974
Redesignated 34th Aeromedical Evacuation Flight on 15 October 1987
Redesignated 34th Aeromedical Evacuation Squadron on 1 November 1990
Inactivated on 1 October 1994
Activated on 1 April 2008

=== Assignments ===
- 2568th Air Reserve Center, 14 April 1959
- 7th Aeromedical Evacuation Group, 1 January 1961
- 2484th Air Force Reserve Sector, 1 October 1964
- 4th Air Force Reserve Region, 1 July 1963
- 921st Military Airlift Group, 1 May 1968
- 10th Aeromedical Evacuation Group,
- 921st Military Airlift Group, 1 June 1969
- Twenty-Second Air Force, 15 June 1969
- 4th Air Force Reserve Region, 30 June 1969
- 921st Military Airlift Group (later 921st Tactical Airlift Group), 1 June 1969
- 433d Military Airlift Wing, 1 November 1974
- 302d Tactical Airlift Wing, 1 April 1985
- 433d Military Airlift Wing, 1 June 1987
- 433d Operations Group, 1 August 1992 – 1 October 1994
- 302d Operations Group, 1 April 2008 – present

=== Stations ===
- Brooks Air Force Base, Texas, 14 April 1959
- Kelly Air Force Base, Texas, 15 November 1960 – 1 October 1994
- Peterson Space Force Base, Colorado, 1 April 2008 – present
