= 356th Airlift Squadron =

356th Airlift Squadron

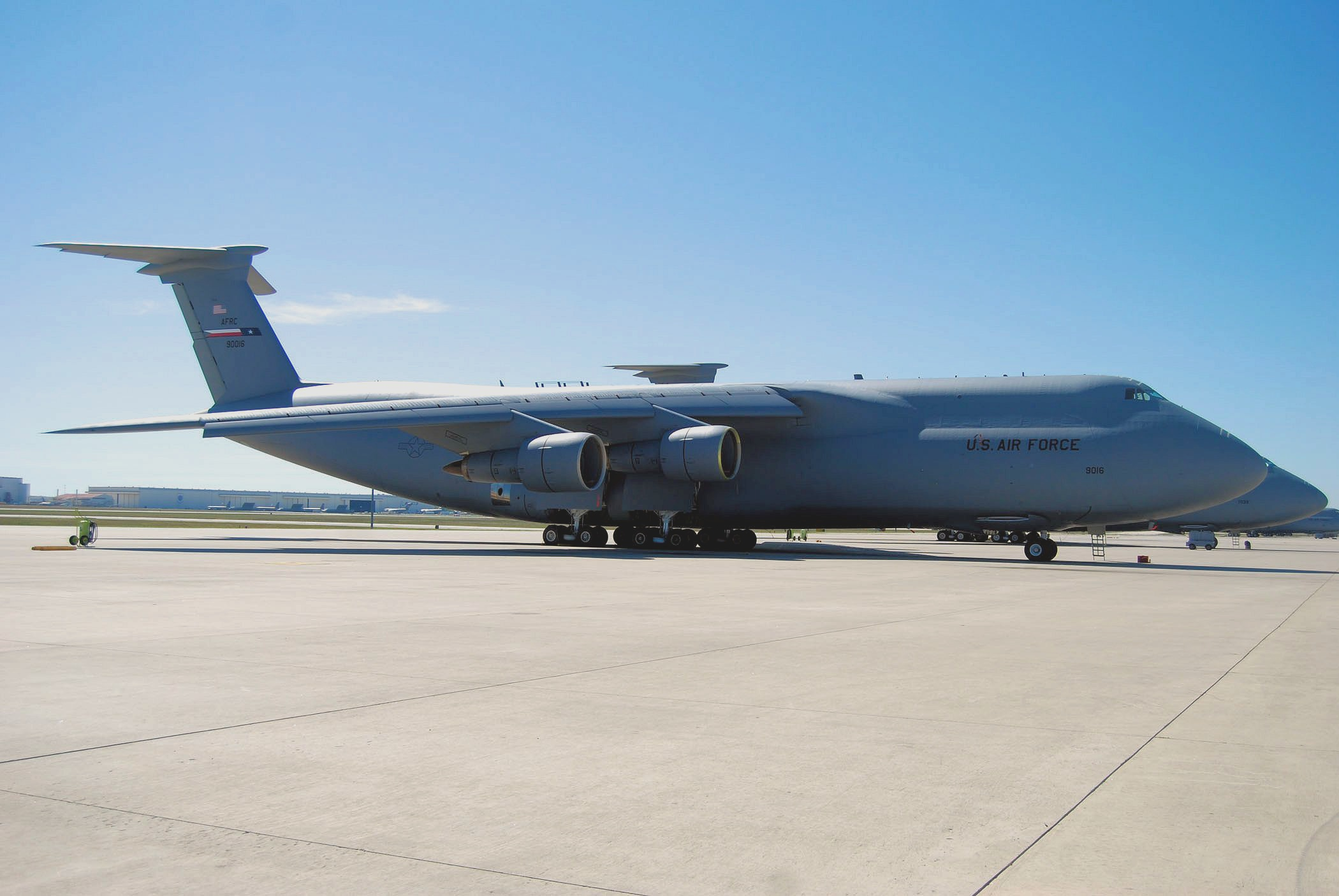
- 433d Airlift Wing C-5A Galaxys
- Active: 1942–1944; 1944–1946; 1949–1950; 1952–2006; 2007–present
- Country: United States
- Branch: United States Air Force
- Role: Airlift
- Part of: Air Force Reserve Command
- Garrison/HQ: Kelly Field Annex
- Motto: Victor Viam Ducat (Latin for 'The Victor Leads the Way')
- Engagements: Pacific Ocean Theater of World War II
- Decorations: Distinguished Unit Citation; Air Force Meritorious Unit Award; Air Force Outstanding Unit Award; Republic of Vietnam Gallantry Cross with Palm

Insignia
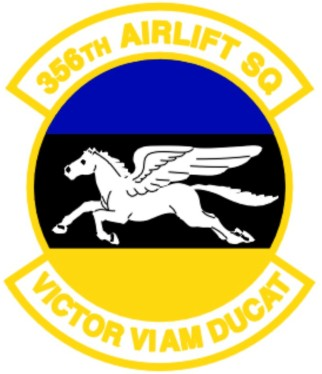
- 356th Airlift Squadron emblem (Note: Modified 29 July 1996.)

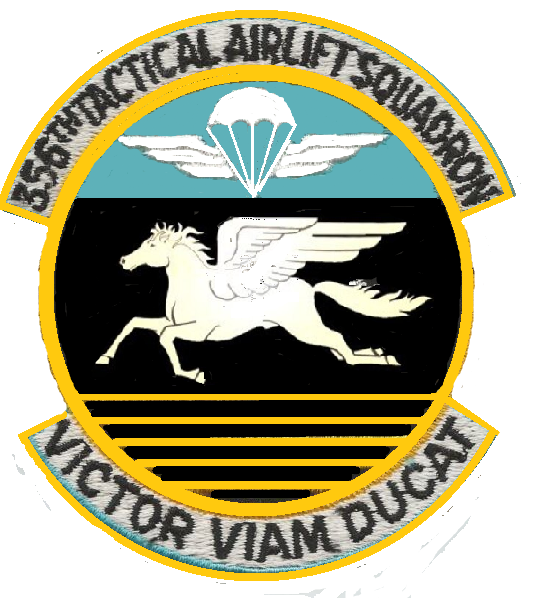
- Patch with 356th Tactical Airlift Squadron emblem (Note: Approved 7 July 1969.)

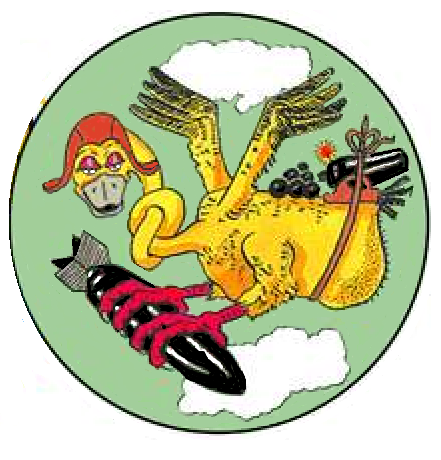
- 356th Bombardment Squadron emblem (1945) (Note: Approved 21 March 1945. Description: On a light blue green disc, edged black, a caricatured "stripped down" duck yellow orange, in flight toward dexter, with red feet, black wing tips, and light magenta eye lids, wearing a brown aviator's helmet, and having a knot tied in the neck, while holding a large black aerial bomb in the feet, and having a small black cannon lighted at the fuse, proper, tied on back with brown string beside six, small, black cannon balls resting on duck's back, all between a white cloud formation in chief and a like formation in base.)

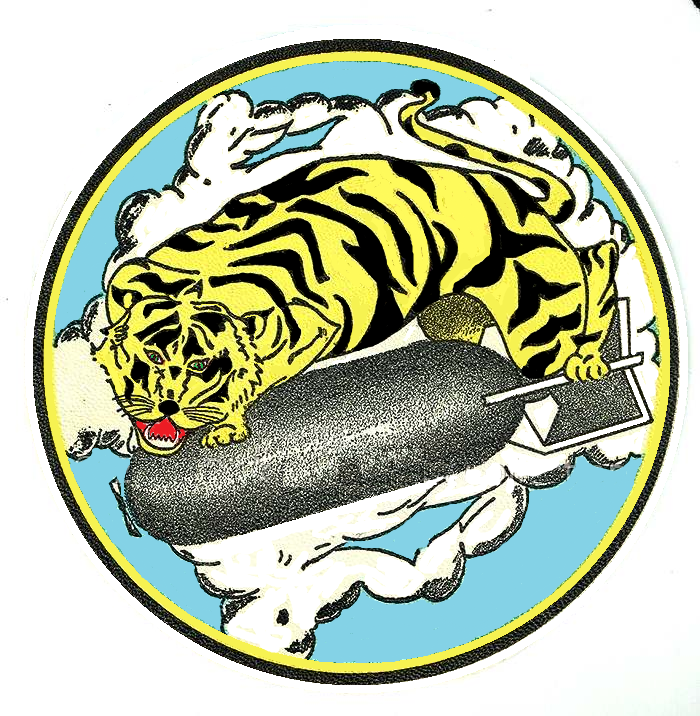
- 356th Bombardment Squadron emblem (1943-1944)

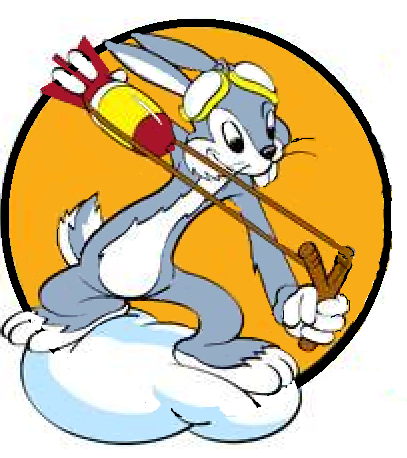
- 356th Bombardment Squadron emblem (1942)

The 356th Airlift Squadron is a United States Air Force Reserve squadron, assigned to the 433d Operations Group of Air Force Reserve Command, stationed at Kelly Field Annex, Joint Base Lackland-San Antonio, Texas. The 356th is the Air Force's Lockheed C-5M Super Galaxy Formal Training Unit.

The squadron was first activated in 1942 as the 356th Bombardment Squadron, and served as a training unit until the spring of 1944, when it was inactivated in a reorganization of training units by the Army Air Forces. It was activated again as a Boeing B-29 Superfortress unit. It deployed to the Pacific in the spring of 1945 and participated in the strategic bombing campaign against Japan, earning a Distinguished Unit Citation. After V-J Day, the squadron remained in the Pacific until 1946, when it was inactivated.

The squadron was redesignated the 356th Troop Carrier Squadron and activated in the military reserve force in 1949, but was inactivated a few months later. When the reserves resumed flying operations after the Korean War, the squadron was activated again in 1952. It served continuously as an airlift organization in the reserve until 2006, except for a brief period as the 356th Special Operations Squadron. The squadron was called to active duty during the Cuban Missile Crisis. It was activated in its current role in 2007.

== Mission ==
The squadron operates the Air Force Reserve's only Formal Training Unit providing initial and advanced C-5 flight qualification for Air Mobility Command, Air National Guard and Air Force Reserve Command aircrews.

== History ==
=== World War II ===
==== Heavy bomber training unit ====
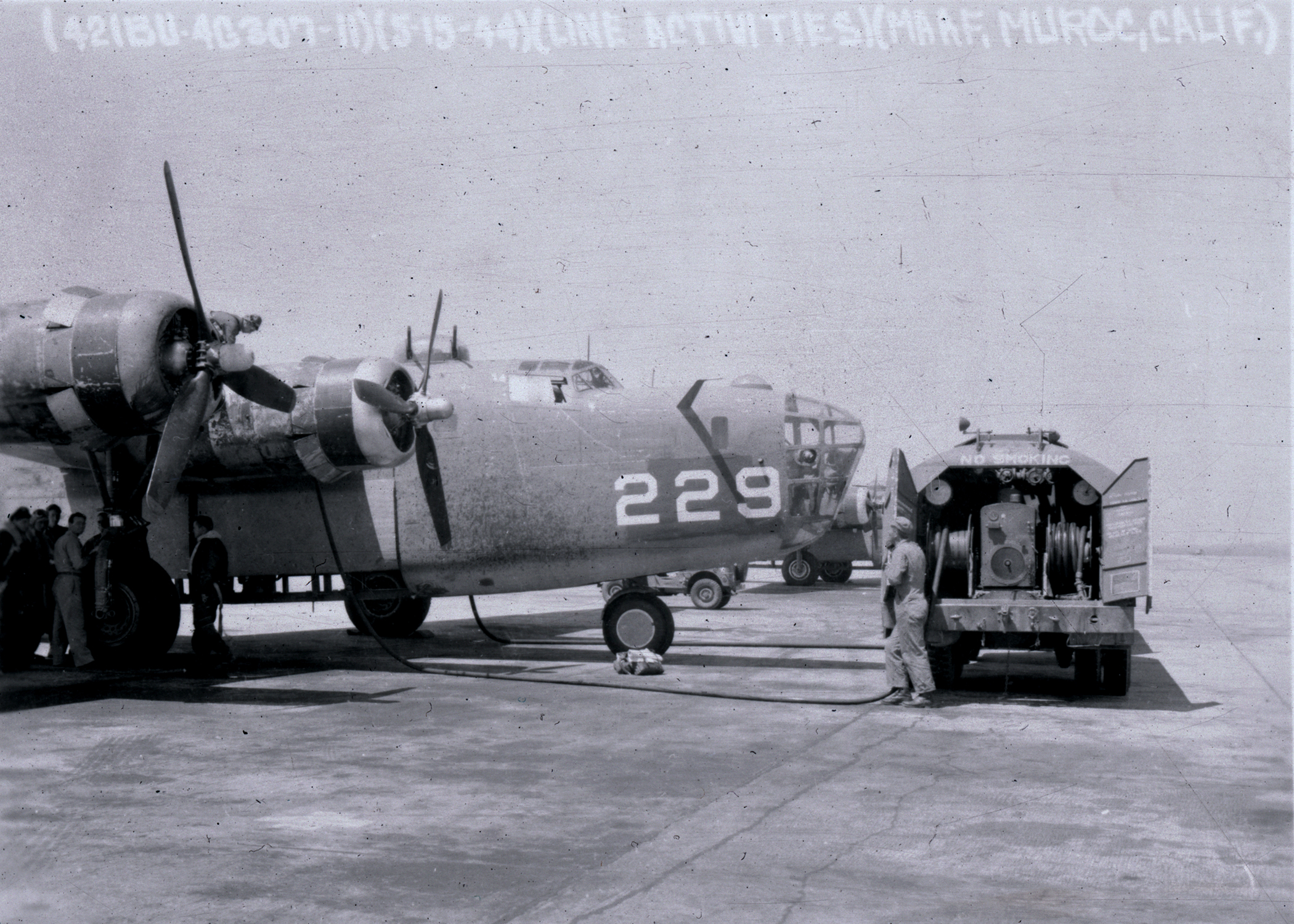
A B-24 of a training unit

The squadron was first activated as the 356th Bombardment Squadron at Geiger Field, Washington in June 1942 as one of the four squadrons of the 302d Bombardment Group. The squadron made a number of moves during the year before becoming an Operational Training Unit (OTU) for Consolidated B-24 Liberator units in early 1943. The OTU program involved the use of an oversized parent unit to provide cadres to “satellite groups " The OTU program was patterned after the unit training system of the Royal Air Force. OTUs assumed responsibility for satellite unit training and oversaw their expansion with graduates of Army Air Forces Training Command schools to become effective combat units. Phase I training concentrated on individual training in crewmember specialties. Phase II training emphasized the coordination for the crew to act as a team. The final phase concentrated on operation as a unit.

By the end of the year most combat units had been activated and almost three quarters of them had deployed overseas. With the exception of special programs, like forming Boeing B-29 Superfortress units, training “fillers” for existing units became more important than unit training. The squadron became a Replacement Training Unit. Replacement training units were also oversized units, but trained aircrews prior to their deployment to combat theaters. However, the Army Air Forces also found that standard military units like the 356th, based on relatively inflexible tables of organization, were not well adapted to the training mission. Accordingly, it adopted a more functional system in which each base was organized into a separate numbered unit, while the groups and squadrons acting as RTUs were disbanded or inactivated. This resulted in the squadron, along with other elements of the 302d Group at Chatham Army Air Field, Georgia, being inactivated in the spring of 1944 and being replaced by the 114th AAF Base Unit (Bombardment (Heavy)), which assumed the group's mission, personnel, and equipment

=== Combat in the Pacific ===
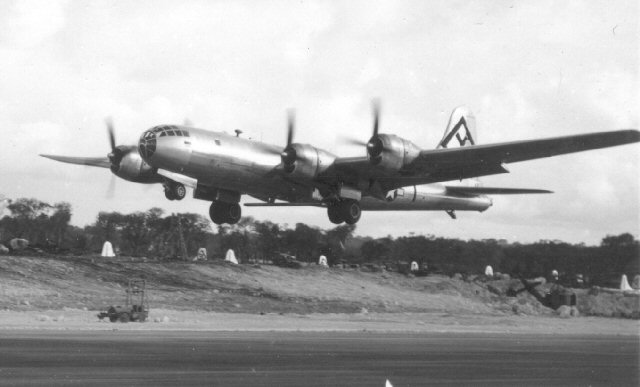
B-29B showing antenna for the AN/APQ-7 radar

In July 1944, the squadron was reactivated at Dalhart Army Air Field, Texas, where it was assigned to the 331st Bombardment Group. At Dalhart, the squadron built up to full strength, moving to Harvard Army Air Field, Nebraska, in November 1944 where it was fully manned and equipped and aircrews began to arrive. Although nominally a very heavy bomber unit, the squadron flew Boeing B-17 Flying Fortresses throughout 1944. In September, key squadron personnel trained at the Army Air Forces School of Applied Tactics, in Florida. Training with B-29 Superfortresses began in December 1944. Winter weather in the Midwest resulted in a notable decrease in flying training hours flown. As a result, the 315th Bombardment Wing implemented a training program, called the "Gypsy Task Force" in which its units would deploy to bases in the Caribbean to take advantage of the better flying weather there. The squadron flew training missions from Vernam Field, Jamaica in this program.

The squadron's B-29s were stripped of most defensive guns and the central fire control system to increase speed and bomb load, The tail gun was aimed and fired using the new AN/APG-15B radar fire control system for its tail guns that detected the approaching enemy plane and made all the necessary calculations. In addition, their bombing radars were upgraded to the AN/APQ-7. The weight reduction from this modification also permitted a larger bomb load on the squadron's bombers.

The squadron left McCook for deployment to the Pacific in April 1945. The ground echelon left for the Port of Embarkation at Seattle on 7 April and boarded the SS Cape Newenham, sailing on the 12th. It arrived at Northwest Field, Guam on 12 May, although the air echelon, staging from Mather Field, California only arrived in late June.

The squadron entered combat in June, with a bombing raid against an airfield on Truk. It flew its first mission against the Japanese home islands on 9 July and afterwards operated principally against the enemy's petroleum industry on Honshu. It attacked the coal liquification plant at Ube, the Mitsubishi-Hayama petroleum complex at Kawasaki, (Note: This included four adjacent facilities operated by Standard Oil, Rising Sun Oil, Nippon Oil, and Mitsui Products. Starr, p. 97.) and the oil refinery and storage facility at Shimotsu. For pressing these attacks despite bad weather, and heavy fighter and flak defenses, the squadron was awarded a Distinguished Unit Citation The squadron flew its final mission on the night of 14/15 August 1945.

Following V-J Day, the squadron flew supply drop missions to prisoner of war camps in Japan and Mongolia. On 2 September, it participated in a show of force over Tokyo during the surrender ceremony. Personnel began rotating back to the United States in November 1945, when the 331st Group's strength was reduced from 50 to 39 Superfortresses and crews began ferrying surplus bombers back to the United States. The squadron was reduced to a paper unit on 15 February 1945, with its remaining personnel and planes being transferred to the 501st Bombardment Group. It was inactivated on Guam on 15 April 1946.

=== Air Force reserve operations ===
==== Initial troop carrier operations ====
The squadron was redesignated the 356th Troop Carrier Squadron and activated in the reserve at McChord Air Force Base, Washington in late June 1949. The squadron was a new type of reserve unit, a corollary unit, which was a reserve unit integrated with an active duty unit. The plan was viewed as the best method to train reservists by mixing them with an existing regular unit to perform duties alongside the regular unit, in this case, the 62d Troop Carrier Wing, using the 60th Wing's Douglas C-54 Skymasters. The program's objective was to permit reservists to be employed immediately upon mobilization, either as individuals or as a unit. However, President Truman’s reduced 1949 defense budget required reductions in the number of units in the Air Force, and the 356th was inactivated in January 1950.

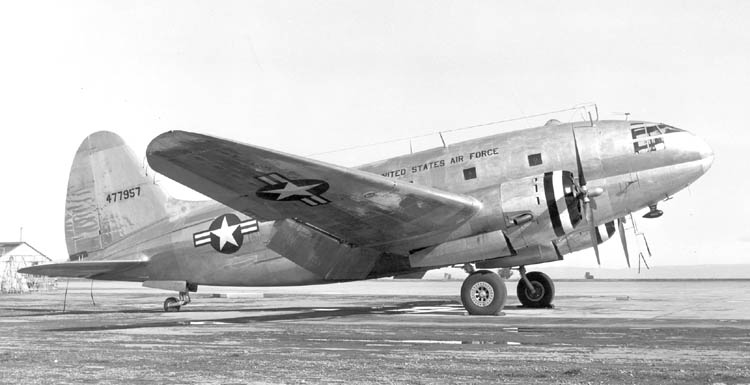
Curtiss C-46D of the Air Force Reserve

The squadron was again activated in the reserves in June 1952 at Clinton County Air Force Base, Ohio. The reserve mobilization for the Korean War, however, had left the reserve without aircraft, and the unit did not receive aircraft until July 1952, when it began to receive Curtiss C-46 Commandos. In the summer of 1956, the squadron participated in Operation Sixteen Ton during its two weeks of active duty training. Sixteen Ton was performed entirely by reserve troop carrier units and moved United States Coast Guard equipment From Floyd Bennett Naval Air Station to Isla Grande Airport in Puerto Rico and San Salvador in the Bahamas. After the success of Operation Sixteen Ton, the squadron began to use inactive duty training periods for Operation Swift Lift, transporting high priority cargo for the Air Force and Operation Ready Swap, transporting aircraft engines, between Air Materiel Command’s depots. In addition, the squadron flew occasional airlift missions overseas.

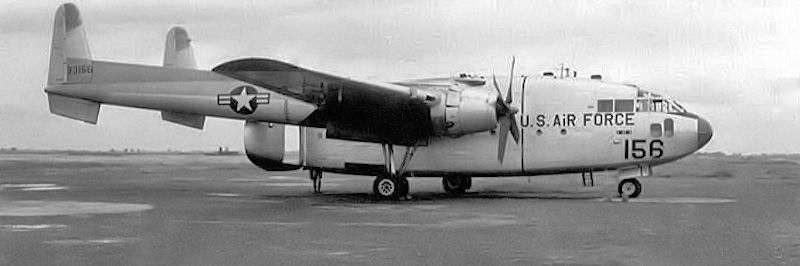
C-119G Flying Boxcar as flown by the squadron

During the mid-1950s, the Joint Chiefs of Staff were pressuring the Air Force to provide more wartime airlift. At the same time, about 150 Fairchild C-119 Flying Boxcars became available from the active force. By the following year, the squadron had traded its Commandos for the newer Flying Boxcars. In 1958, the squadron began converting to the reserve technician program. Under this program, some squadron reservists were also full-time civil service employees and provided continuity and training for traditional reservists assigned to the squadron. This system was more cost effective than the previous system, which required a regular unit, the 2252nd Air Force Reserve Flying Training Center, to provide required training for the squadron.. The following year, Continental Air Command adopted the dual deputy organization. The 302d Troop Carrier Group was inactivated, and the squadron was assigned directly to the 302d Troop Carrier Wing.

==== Cuban mobilization and reorganization ====
Although mobilization of an entire reserve wing was not a problem, mobilizing a single flying squadron and elements to support it proved difficult. This weakness was demonstrated in the partial mobilization of reserve units during the Berlin Crisis of 1961. To resolve this problem, Continental Air Command, (ConAC) determined to reorganize its reserve wings by establishing groups with support elements for each of its troop carrier squadrons at the start of 1962. This reorganization would facilitate mobilization of elements of wings in various combinations when needed.

In the fall of 1962, the squadron was called to active duty a second time for the Cuban Missile Crisis, although it was released on 22 November 1962, the Cuban mobilization delayed the formation of the planned groups. On 11 February 1963, the squadron was assigned to the 907th Troop Carrier Group, which included a combat support squadron, a materiel squadron and a medical unit. By the mid-1960s, squadron aircraft and crews performed worldwide airlift missions and participated in numerous tactical exercises. Although reserve units were not mobilized for the Vietnam War, individual reservists did fly wartime missions while performing their regular active duty training. This activity became more intense following the seizure of the USS Pueblo. Between February and March 1968, reserve airlift units transported ground troops to Korea and Southeast Asia. For its participation in this operation, the squadron was awarded the Vietnamese Gallantry Cross with Palm. In January 1970, the squadron was redesignated the 356th Special Operations Squadron, focusing on training crews on the Fairchild AC-119.

==== Tactical airlift operations ====
The squadron moved to Lockbourne Air Force Base in late July 1971, where it returned to the 356th Tactical Airlift Squadron designation. The following year, it began to re-equip with Fairchild C-123K Providers. It trained for and flew airlift missions, participating in exercises, supporting unit deployments, taking part in special assignment airlift missions. The 907th Group inactivated in September 1975, and the squadron was again assigned directly to the 302nd Wing. This action was reversed in April 1981, when 302nd Wing was inactivated and the 906th was reactivated. 1981 also saw the beginning of the squadron's transition to the Lockheed C-130 Hercules. However, when the 355th Tactical Airlift Squadron inactivated in July 1982, it transferred four UC-123K aircraft to the squadron for insecticide spray missions. Beginning in April 1973, the squadron began rotating personnel and planes to Howard Air Force Base, Panama to support USAF Southern Command. Operation Volant Oak rotated portions of Air National Guard and Air Force Reserve C-130 units on short tours of active duty to meet the theater airlift requirements of the United States Southern Command in Latin America. In 1991, it deployed personnel and C-130s for Operation Desert Storm.

==== Global airlift operations ====
In February 1992, as the Air Force dropped the distinction between "strategic" and "tactical" units, the squadron became the 356th Airlift Squadron, In August, Air Force Reserve Command implemented the objective wing organization and the squadron was reassigned to the new 907th Operations Group. That same year it began converting to Lockheed C-141 Starlifters. The squadron moved with the 907th to Wright-Patterson Air Force Base in April 1993 and was reassigned to the 445th Operations Group when the 907th was inactivated in October 1994. The squadron provided global airlift with its Starlifters until 30 June 2006 when it was inactivated as the C-141 was withdrawn from service at Wright-Patterson.

==== Airlift training ====
The squadron was activated in the reserve on 9 January 2007. Since 2007 the 356th has conducted aircrew training for the Lockheed C-5 Galaxy. The final C-5A Galaxy aircraft departed Kelly Field on 28 September 2016. The first of the squadron's eight Lockheed Martin C-5M Super Galaxy aircraft, arrived June 2016.

== Lineage ==
- Constituted as the 356th Bombardment Squadron (Heavy) on 28 January 1942

Activated on 1 June 1942
Inactivated on 10 April 1944
Redesignated 356th Bombardment Squadron, Very Heavy on 27 June 1944
Activated on 7 July 1944
Inactivated on 15 April 1946
Redesignated 356th Troop Carrier Squadron, Medium on 16 May 1949
Activated in the reserve on 27 June 1949
Inactivated on 28 January 1950
Activated in the reserve on 14 June 1952
Ordered to active service on 28 October 1962
Relieved from active service on 28 November 1962
Redesignated 356th Tactical Airlift Squadron on 1 July 1967
Redesignated 356th Special Operations Squadron on 25 June 1970
Redesignated 356th Tactical Airlift Squadron on 26 July 1971
Redesignated 356th Airlift Squadron on 1 February 1992
Inactivated on 30 June 2006
Activated in the reserve on 9 January 2007

=== Assignments ===
- 302d Bombardment Group, 1 June 1942 – 10 April 1944
- 331st Bombardment Group, 7 July 1944 – 15 April 1946
- 302d Troop Carrier Group, 27 June 1949 – 28 January 1950
- 302d Troop Carrier Group, 14 June 1952
- 302d Troop Carrier Wing, 14 April 1959
- 907th Troop Carrier Group (later 907th Tactical Airlift Group, 907th Special Operations Group, 907th Tactical Airlift Group), 11 February 1963
- 302d Tactical Airlift Wing, 1 September 1975
- 907th Tactical Airlift Group (later 907 Airlift Group), 1 April 1981
- 907th Operations Group, 1 August 1992
- 445th Operations Group, 1 October 1994 – 30 June 2006
- 433d Operations Group, 9 January 2007– present

=== Stations ===
- Geiger Field, Washington, 1 June 1942
- Davis–Monthan Field, Arizona, 23 June 1942
- Wendover Field, Utah, 30 July 1942
- Pueblo Army Air Base, Colorado, 30 September 1942
- Davis–Monthan Field, Arizona, 1 December 1942
- Clovis Army Air Field, New Mexico, 29 January 1943
- Langley Field, Virginia, 17 December 1943
- Chatham Army Air Field, Georgia, 27 January–10 April 1944
- Dalhart Army Air Field, Texas, 7 July 1944
- McCook Army Air Field, Nebraska, 22 November 1944 – 8 April 1945
- Northwest Field (Guam), Mariana Islands, 12 May 1945 – 15 April 1946
- McChord Air Force Base, Washington, 27 June 1949 – 28 January 1950
- Clinton County Air Force Base, Ohio, 14 June 1952
- Lockbourne Air Force Base (later Rickenbacker Air Force Base, Rickenbacker Air National Guard Base), Ohio, 26 July 1971
- Wright-Patterson Air Force Base, Ohio, 1 April 1993 – 30 June 2006
- Kelly Annex, Lackland Air Force Base, Texas (later Kelly Annex, Joint Base San Antonio-Lackland), 9 January 2007 – present

=== Aircraft ===
- Consolidated B-24 Liberator (1942–1944)
- Boeing B-17 Flying Fortress (1944)
- Boeing B-29B Superfortress (1945–1946)
- Douglas C-54 Skymaster (1949–1950)
- Curtiss C-46 Commando (1952–1957)
- Fairchild C-119 Flying Boxcar (1956–1973)
- Fairchild C-123 Provider (1972–1981)
- Fairchild UC-123 Provider (1982)
- Lockheed C-130 Hercules (1981–1992)
- Lockheed C-141 Starlifter (1992–2006)
- Lockheed C-5A Galaxy (2007–2016)
- Lockheed C-5M Super Galaxy (2016–Present)

=== Awards and campaigns ===
Award streamer	Award	Dates	Notes
	Distinguished Unit Citation	22–29 July 1945	Japan, 356th Bombardment Squadron
	Air Force Meritorious Unit Award	15 May 2003–31 August 2004	356th Airlift Squadron
	Air Force Outstanding Unit Award	1 January–31 December 1970	356th Special Operations Squadron
	Air Force Outstanding Unit Award	1 January 1977–31 December 1978	356th Tactical Airlift Squadron
	Air Force Outstanding Unit Award	1 October 1999–30 September 2001	356th Airlift Squadron
	Air Force Outstanding Unit Award	[9] January 2007–31 December 2008	356th Airlift Squadron
	Vietnamese Gallantry Cross with Palm	14 February–11 March 1988	356th Tactical Airlift Squadron

Campaign Streamer	Campaign	Dates	Notes
	American Theater without inscription	1 June 1943–1 April 1944, 7 July 1944–8 April 1945	356th Bombardment Squadron
	Air Offensive, Japan	12 May 1945 – 2 September 1945	356th Bombardment Squadron
	Western Pacific	12 May 1945 – 2 September 1945	356th Bombardment Squadron
	Eastern Mandates	June 1945–July 1945 (Note: Credit awarded for actual combat in theater outside dates of campaign. Maurer, Combat Squadrons, p. 802.)	356th Bombardment Squadron
	Liberation and Defense of Kuwait	17 January 1991 – 11 April 1991	356th Tactical Airlift Squadron
	Global War on Terror Expeditionary		356th Airlift Squadron

== See also ==
- List of United States Air Force airlift squadrons
- B-17 Flying Fortress units of the United States Army Air Forces
- B-24 Liberator units of the United States Army Air Forces
- List of B-29 Superfortress operators
- List of C-130 Hercules operators
