= 357th Airlift Squadron =

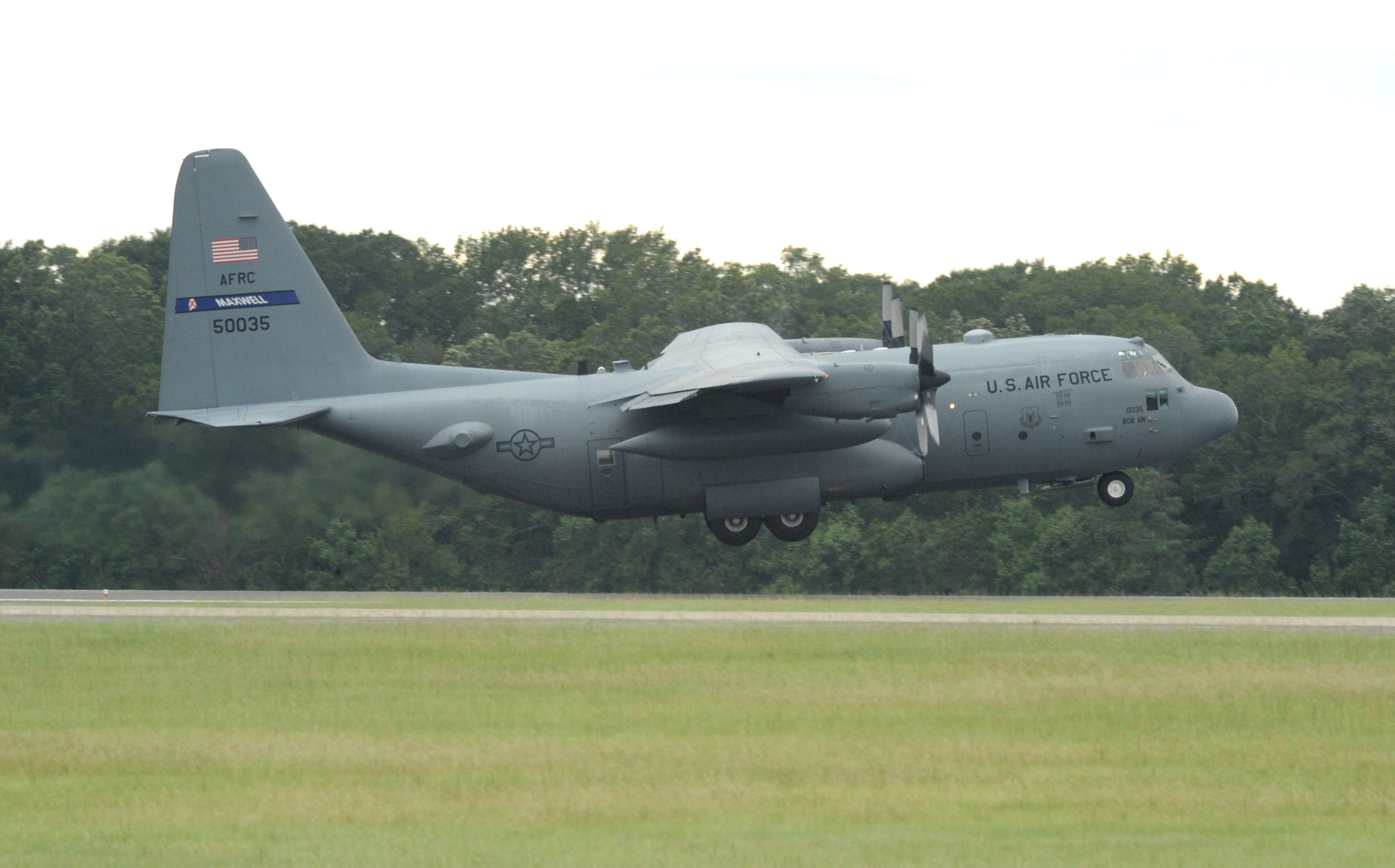
- 357th Airlift Squadron C-130 City of Montgomery
- Active: 1942–1944; 1944–1946; 1952–2024
- Country: United States
- Branch: United States Air Force
- Role: Airlift
- Motto: Deliverance
- Engagements: Air Offensive, Japan; Eastern Mandates; Western Pacific
- Decorations: Distinguished Unit Citation; Air Force Outstanding Unit Award

Insignia
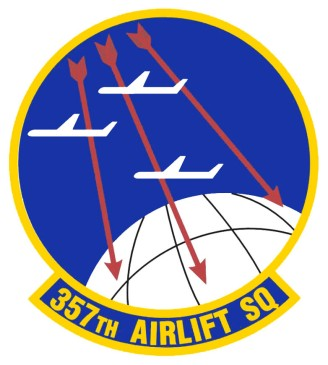
- 357th Airlift Squadron emblem (Note: Approved 26 June 1986. Description: On a dark blue disc a white demisphere with black grid lines issuing from the base, overall three diagonal arrows detailed black from upper left to lower right and overall three while silhouetted aircraft one and two; all within a narrow yellow border. Significance: Blue and yellow are the Air Force colors. Blue alludes to the sky, the primary theater of Air Force operations. Yellow refers to the sun and the excellence of Air Force personnel. The aircraft in flight formation represent[] the means by which the assigned mission is accomplished. The arrows indicate the tactical air to ground nature of the squadron's mission. The earth denotes the squadron's global mission.)

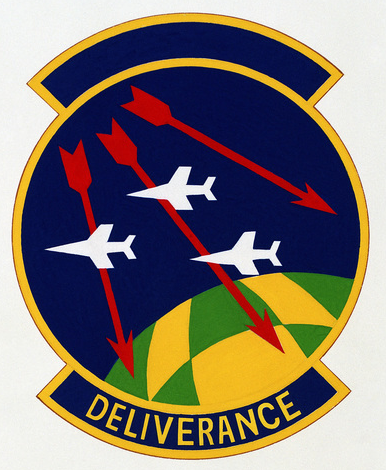
- 357th Tactical Airlift Squadron emblem (Note: This emblem was approved for the squadron in 1986, when it was programmed to become a fighter aircraft unit. However, the change did not occur, and the emblem was modified to show stylized airlift aircraft in place of the stylized fighter aircraft.)

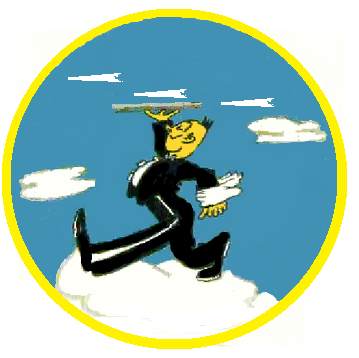
- Early 357th Tactical Airlift Squadron emblem

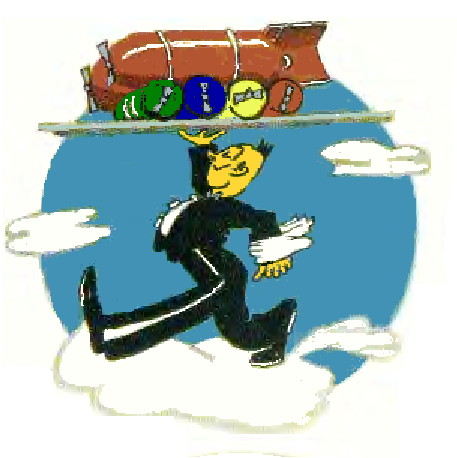
- 357th Bombardment Squadron emblem (Note: Approved 20 November 1945. Description: Over and through a light turquoise blue disc, a caricatured waiter attired proper, stalking toward dexter across a white cloud formation in base, with smug look of satisfaction on face, having a white napkin folded over the left forearm, and holding aloft with the right hand a large metal tray, supporting two, very large, red aerial bombs, banded white, resting on top, of varied-size aerial bombs of green, blue, yellow and red, reading from left to right respectively, emitting wisps of vapor toward rear.)

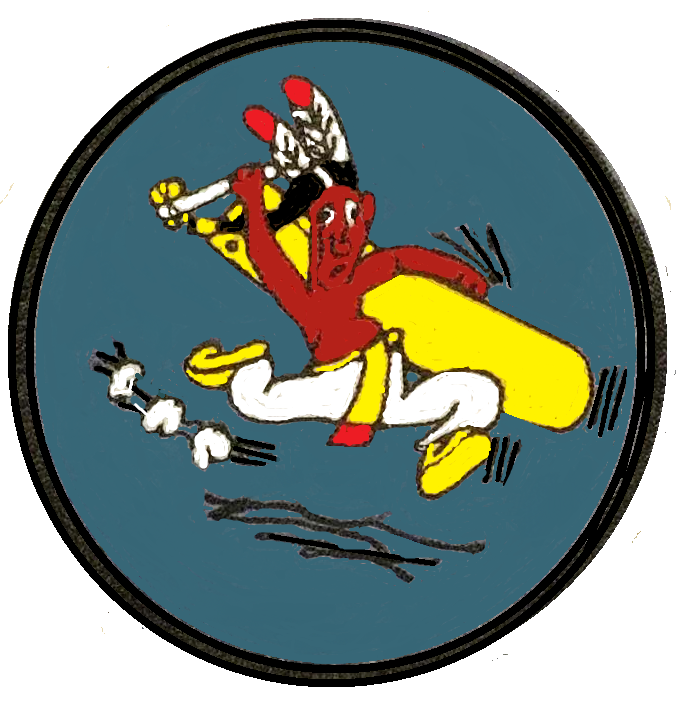
- 357th Bombardment Squadron emblem (1942-1944)

The 357th Airlift Squadron is an inactive unit of the United States Air Force it was last assigned to the 908th Airlift Wing at Maxwell Air Force Base, Alabama, where it had been an airlift unit of the military reserve force since 1952, except for a period from 1969 to 1971, when it served as a tactical air support unit. The squadron was called to active duty during the Cuban Missile Crisis. The squadron was inactivated in July 2024, when its parent became a training unit for helicopters.

The squadron was first activated during World War II as a heavy bombardment training unit, serving both as an Operational Training Unit, then as a Replacement Training Unit. It was inactivated in 1944, in a general reorganization of Army Air Forces training and support units. It was soon activated again as a very heavy bombardment squadron. It deployed to the Pacific, where it earned a Distinguished Unit Citation while participating in strategic bombing campaign against Japan. It was inactivated in Guam during the spring of 1946.

== History ==
=== World War II ===
==== Heavy bomber training unit ====
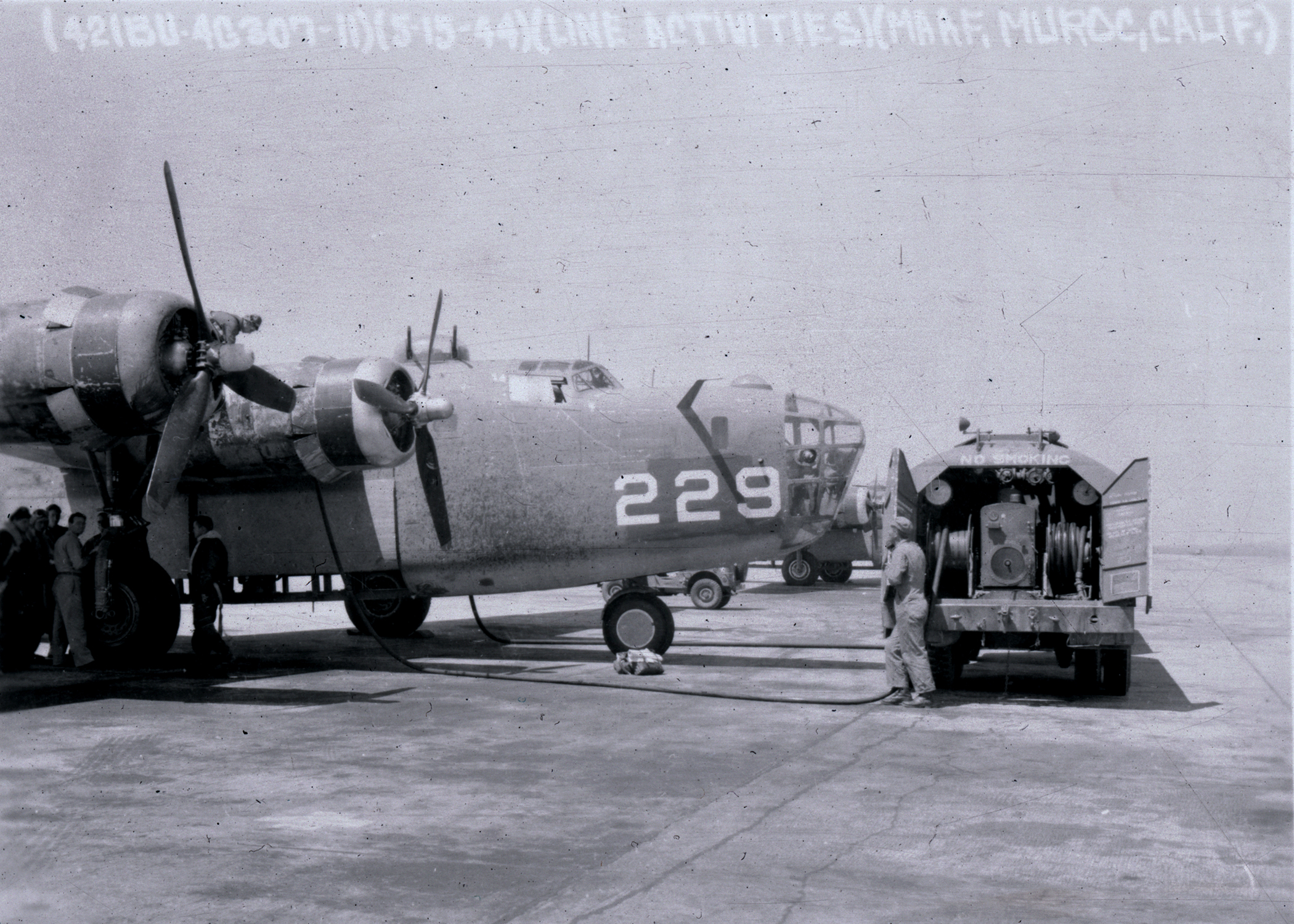
A B-24 of a training unit

The squadron was first activated as the 357th Bombardment Squadron at Geiger Field, Washington in June 1942 as one of the four squadrons of the 302d Bombardment Group. The squadron made a number of moves during the year before becoming an Operational Training Unit (OTU) in early 1943. The OTU program involved the use of an oversized parent unit to provide cadres to “satellite groups " The OTU program was patterned after the unit training system of the Royal Air Force. OTUs assumed responsibility for satellite unit training and oversaw their expansion with graduates of Army Air Forces Training Command schools to become effective combat units. Phase I training concentrated on individual training in crewmember specialties. Phase II training emphasized the coordination for the crew to act as a team. The final phase concentrated on operation as a unit.

By the end of the year most combat units had been activated and almost three quarters of them had deployed overseas. With the exception of special programs, like forming Boeing B-29 Superfortress units, training “fillers” for existing units became more important than unit training. The squadron became a Replacement Training Unit. Replacement training units were also oversized units, but trained aircrews prior to their deployment to combat theaters. However, the Army Air Forces also found that standard military units like the 355th, based on relatively inflexible tables of organization, were not well adapted to the training mission. Accordingly, it adopted a more functional system in which each base was organized into a separate numbered unit, while the groups and squadrons acting as RTUs were disbanded or inactivated. This resulted in the squadron, along with other elements of the 302d Group at Chatham Army Air Field, Georgia, being inactivated in the spring of 1944 and being replaced by the 114th AAF Base Unit (Bombardment (Heavy)), which assumed the group's mission, personnel, and equipment

==== Combat in the Pacific ====
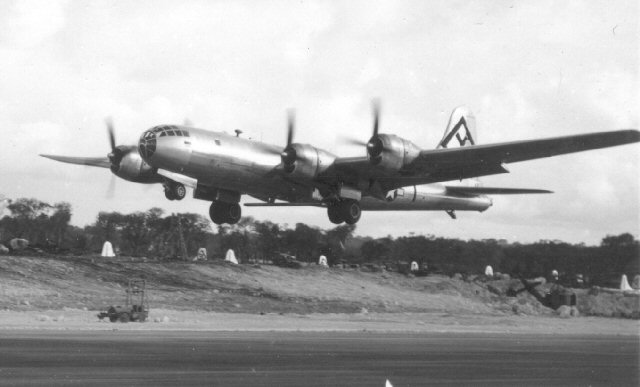
B-29B showing antenna for the AN/APQ-7 radar

In July 1944, the squadron was reactivated at Dalhart Army Air Field, Texas, where it was assigned to the 331st Bombardment Group. At Dalhart, the squadron built up to full strength, moving to Harvard Army Air Field, Nebraska, in November 1944 where it was fully manned and equipped and aircrews began to arrive. Although nominally a very heavy bomber unit, the squadron flew Boeing B-17 Flying Fortresses throughout 1944. In September, key squadron personnel trained at the Army Air Forces School of Applied Tactics, in Florida. Training with B-29 Superfortresses began in December 1944. Winter weather in the Midwest resulted in a notable decrease in flying training hours flown. As a result, the 315th Bombardment Wing implemented a training program, called the "Gypsy Task Force" in which its units would deploy to bases in the Caribbean to take advantage of the better flying weather there. The squadron flew training missions from Vernam Field, Jamaica in this program.

The squadron's B-29s were stripped of most defensive guns and the central fire control system to increase speed and bomb load, The tail gun was aimed and fired using the new AN/APG-15B radar fire control system for its tail guns that detected the approaching enemy plane and made all the necessary calculations. In addition, their bombing radars were upgraded to the AN/APQ-7. The weight reduction from this modification also permitted a larger bomb load on the squadron's bombers.

The squadron left McCook for deployment to the Pacific in April 1945. The ground echelon left for the Port of Embarkation at Seattle on 7 April and boarded the SS Cape Newenham, sailing on the 12th. It arrived at Northwest Field, Guam on 12 May, although the air echelon, staging from Mather Field, California only arrived in late June.

The squadron entered combat in June, with a bombing raid against an airfield on Truk. It flew its first mission against the Japanese home islands on 9 July and afterwards operated principally against the enemy's petroleum industry on Honshu. It attacked the coal liquification plant at Ube, the Mitsubishi-Hayama petroleum complex at Kawasaki, (Note: This included four adjacent facilities operated by Standard Oil, Rising Sun Oil, Nippon Oil, and Mitsui Products. Starr, p. 97.) and the oil refinery and storage facility at Shimotsu. For pressing these attacks despite bad weather, and heavy fighter and flak defenses, the squadron was awarded a Distinguished Unit Citation The squadron flew its final mission on the night of 14/15 August 1945.

Following V-J Day, the squadron flew supply drop missions to prisoner of war camps in Japan and Mongolia. On 2 September, it participated in a show of force over Tokyo during the surrender ceremony. Personnel began rotating back to the United States in November 1945, when the 331st Group's strength was reduced from 50 to 39 Superfortresses and crews began ferrying surplus bombers back to the United States. The squadron was reduced to a paper unit on 15 February 1945, with its remaining personnel and planes being transferred to the 501st Bombardment Group. It was inactivated on Guam on 15 April 1946.

=== Reserve Operations ===
==== Initial troop carrier operations ====
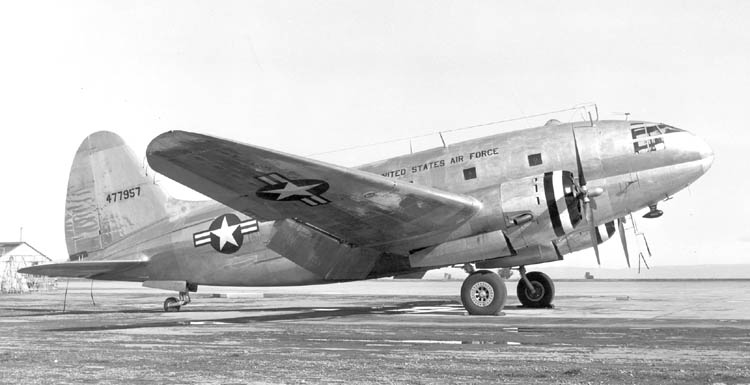
Curtiss C-46D of the Air Force Reserve

The squadron was redesignated the 357th Troop Carrier Squadron and activated in the reserve at Clinton County Air Force Base, Ohio in June 1952. The reserve mobilization for the Korean War, however, had left the reserve without aircraft, and the unit did not receive aircraft until July, when it began to receive Curtiss C-46 Commandos. In the summer of 1956, the squadron participated in Operation Sixteen Ton during its two weeks of active duty training. Sixteen Ton was performed entirely by reserve troop carrier units and moved United States Coast Guard equipment From Floyd Bennett Naval Air Station to Isla Grande Airport in Puerto Rico and San Salvador in the Bahamas. After the success of Operation Sixteen Ton, the squadron began to use inactive duty training periods for Operation Swift Lift, transporting high priority cargo for the Air Force and Operation Ready Swap, transporting aircraft engines, between Air Materiel Command’s depots. In addition, the squadron flew occasional airlift missions overseas.

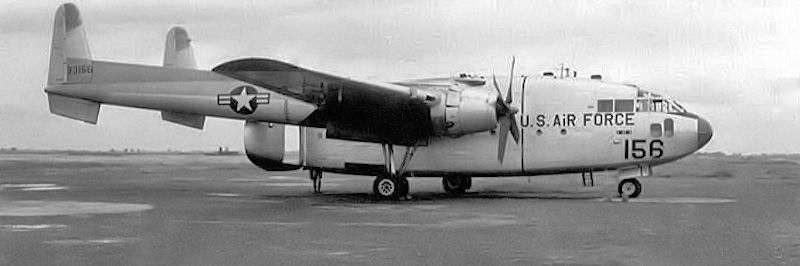
C-119G Flying Boxcar as flown by the squadron

During the mid-1950s, the Joint Chiefs of Staff were pressuring the Air Force to provide more wartime airlift. At the same time, about 150 Fairchild C-119 Flying Boxcars became available from the active force. During 1956, the squadron traded its Commandos for the newer Flying Boxcars.

Starting in 1955, the Air Force began detaching reserve squadrons from their parent wing locations to separate sites. The concept offered several advantages: communities were more likely to accept the smaller squadrons than the large wings and the location of separate squadrons in smaller population centers would facilitate recruiting and manning. Under this concept, the number of reserve squadrons at Clinton County was reduced, and in November 1957, the squadron moved to Donaldson Air Force Base, South Carolina, where it absorbed the personnel and equipment of the 706th Troop Carrier Squadron and was assigned to the 445th Troop Carrier Group. This alignment lasted only a few months, as the squadron transferred its personnel and equipment to the 77th Troop Carrier Squadron, and moved on paper to New Orleans Naval Air Station, Louisiana, where it was assigned to the 446th Troop Carrier Group. (Note: This was a swap of designations, as the 77th simultaneously moved to Donaldson. Maurer, Combat Squadrons, pp. 278-79.) The following year, Continental Air Command adopted the dual deputy organization. The 446th Troop Carrier Group was inactivated, and the squadron was assigned directly to the 446th Troop Carrier Wing.

The squadron moved to Bates Field, Alabama, where it took over the C-119s and personnel of the 78th Troop Carrier Squadron, having left its personnel and assigned C-119s at New Orleans for the 706th Troop Carrier Squadron, which was activated in its place. This move included a reassignment to the 302d Troop Carrier Wing.

==== Mobilization and formation of group ====
Although mobilization of an entire reserve wing was not a problem, mobilizing a single flying squadron and elements to support it proved difficult. This weakness was demonstrated in the partial mobilization of reserve units during the Berlin Crisis of 1961. To resolve this problem, at the start of 1962, Continental Air Command determined to reorganize its reserve wings by establishing groups with support elements for each of its troop carrier squadrons. This reorganization would facilitate mobilization of elements of wings in various combinations when needed.

In the fall of 1962, the squadron was called to active duty for the Cuban Missile Crisis, although it was released on 22 November 1962, the Cuban mobilization delayed the formation of the planned groups. On 11 February 1963, the squadron was assigned to the 908th Troop Carrier Group, which included a combat support squadron, a materiel squadron and a medical unit. By the mid-1960s, squadron aircraft and crews performed worldwide airlift missions and participated in numerous tactical exercises. In 1964, the squadron moved across town from the civilian Bates Field to Brookley Air Force Base, Alabama. Although its mission did not change, the squadron was redesignated the 357th Tactical Airlift Squadron in July 1967.

==== Tactical air support ====
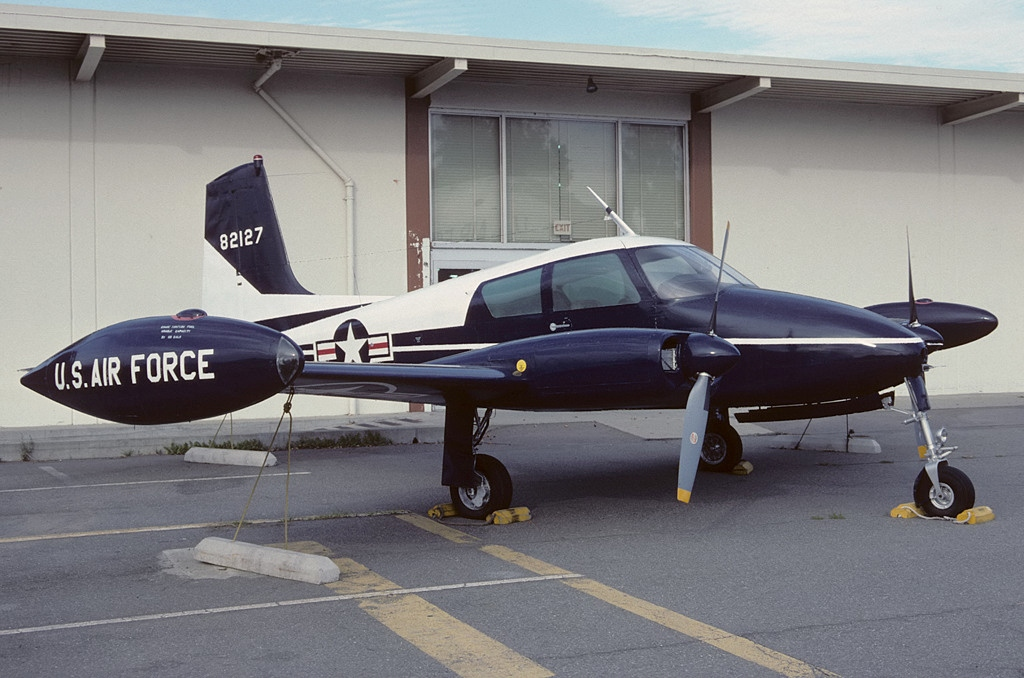
Cessna U-3A Blue Canoe

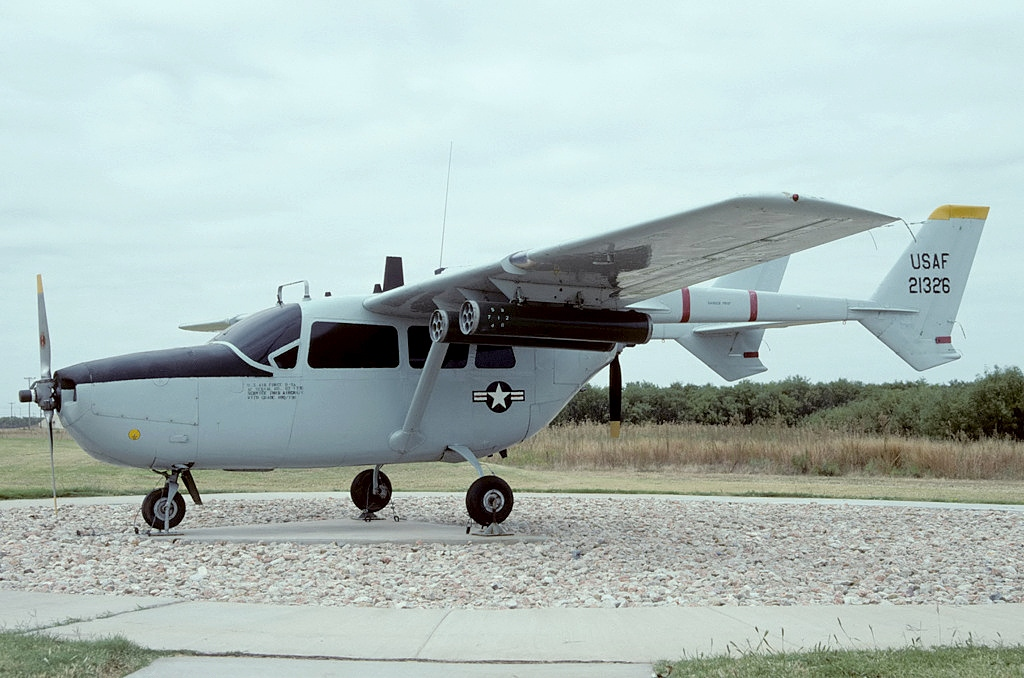
Cessna O-2A Super Skymaster

In July 1969, the Air Force closed Brookley. After drawing down its presence there, the squadron moved to Maxwell Air Force Base, where it became the 357th Tactical Air Support Squadron, on 25 April 1969. Initially, the Air Force lacked enough forward air control capable aircraft to equip reserve units in the US, so the squadron operated Cessna U-3 Blue Canoes. In 1970, the squadron received Cessna O-2 Skymasters.

==== Return to airlift operations ====
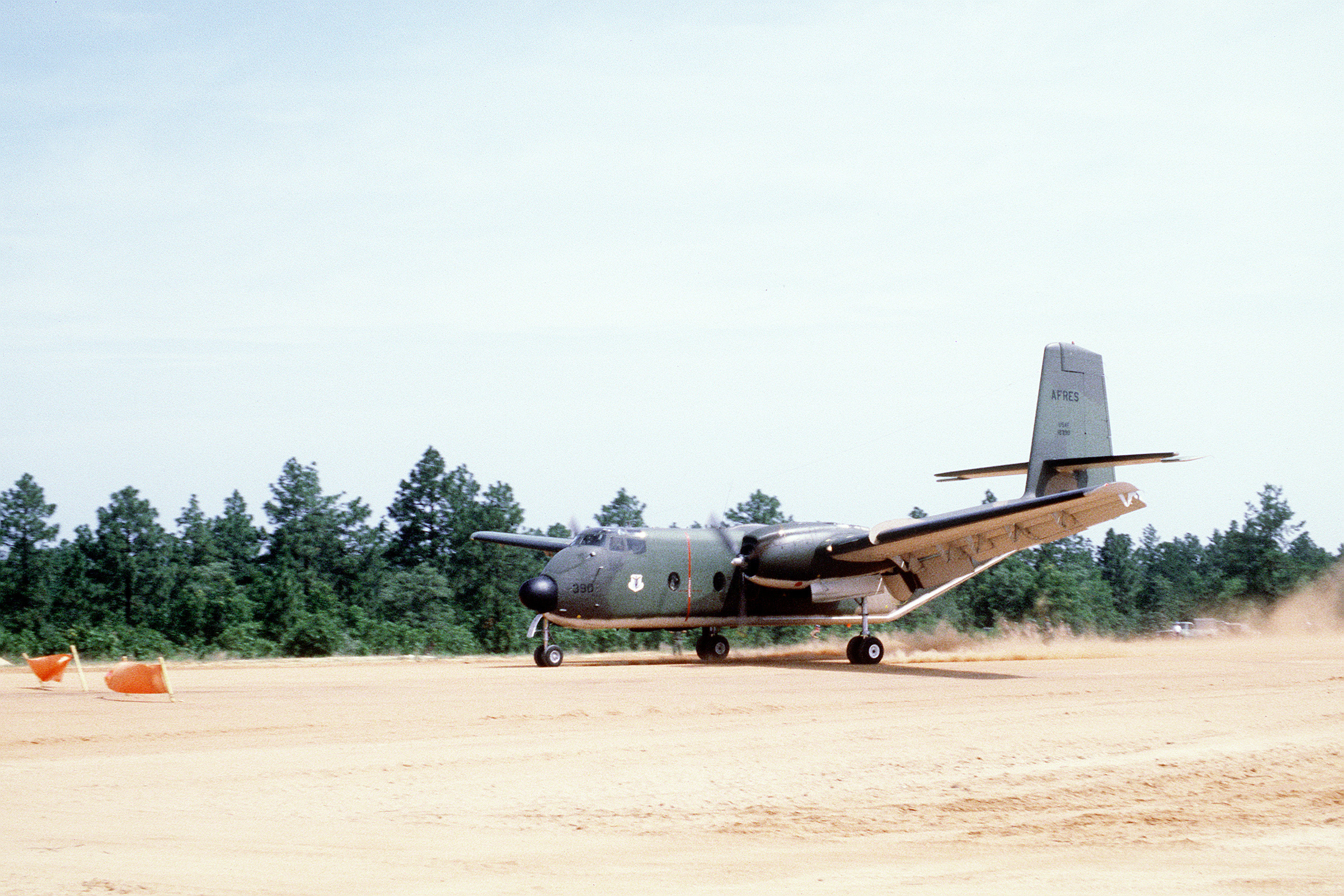
C-7A of the Air Force Reserve

In December 1971, the squadron once again became the 357th Tactical Airlift Squadron and received de Havilland Canada C-7 Caribous. The squadron was one of two reserve squadrons to fy the C-7. The squadron continued to fly the aircraft until 1993, and was the last reserve unit to fly the plane.

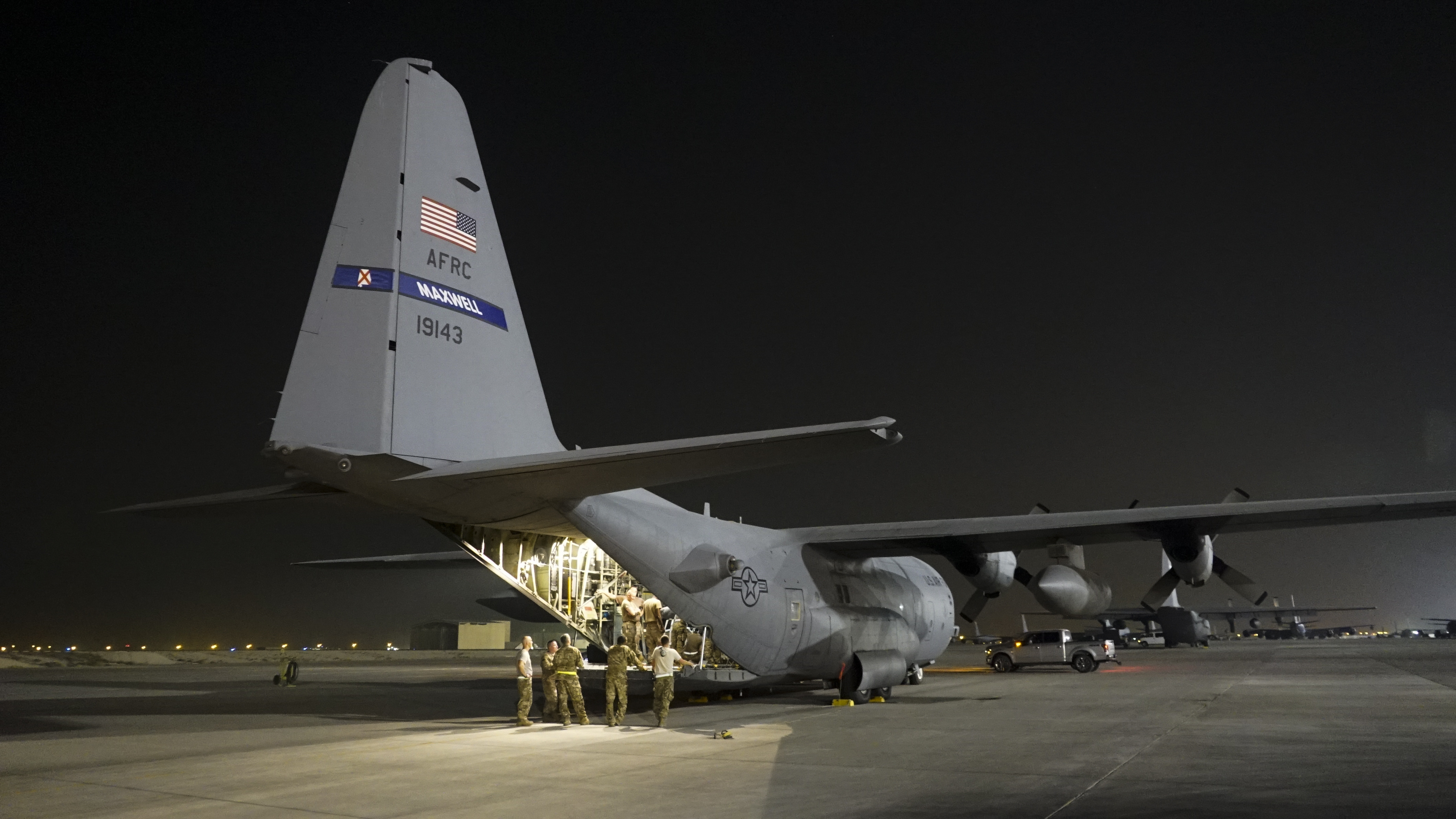
357th AS C-130H deployed

In February 1992, as the Air Force dropped the distinction between "strategic" and "tactical" units, the squadron became the 357th Airlift Squadron, In August, Air Force Reserve Command implemented the objective wing organization and the squadron was reassigned to the new 908th Operations Group. During 1993, the squadron exchanged their Caribous for C-130 Hercules'. It operated Lockheed C-130H Hercules aircraft, providing airlift and related services through the efforts of more than 1,200 reservists and eight C-130 Hercules aircraft. Unit reservists flew approximately 1 million miles annually, engaging in training operations and supporting real-world missions.

In November 2020 the United States Air Force announced that the Boeing MH-139A Grey Wolf Formal Training Unit would be located at Maxwell and that the C-130H aircraft of the 357th would be retired. On 20 July 2024, the squadron was inactivated, and the 703d Helicopter Squadron was activated as the 908th Wing's flying unit.

== Lineage ==
- Constituted as the 357th Bombardment Squadron (Heavy) on 28 January 1942

Activated on 1 June 1942
Inactivated on 10 April 1944

- Redesignated 357th Bombardment Squadron, Very Heavy on 27 June 1944

Activated on 7 July 1944
Inactivated on 15 April 1946

- Redesignated 357th Troop Carrier Squadron, Medium on 26 May 1952

Activated in the reserve on 14 June 1952
Ordered to active duty on 28 October 1962
Relieved from active duty on 28 November 1962
Redesignated 357th Tactical Airlift Squadron on 1 July 1967
Redesignated 357th Tactical Air Support Squadron on 25 April 1969
Redesignated 357th Tactical Airlift Squadron on 15 December 1971
Redesignated 357th Airlift Squadron on 1 February 1992
Inactivated on 20 July 2025

=== Assignments ===
- 302d Bombardment Group, 1 June 1942 – 10 April 1944
- 331st Bombardment Group, 7 July 1944 – 15 April 1946
- 302d Troop Carrier Group, 14 June 1952
- 445th Troop Carrier Group, 16 November 1957
- 446th Troop Carrier Group, 25 March 1958
- 446th Troop Carrier Wing, 14 April 1959
- 302d Troop Carrier Wing, 8 May 1961
- 908th Troop Carrier Group (later 908 Tactical Airlift Group, 908 Tactical Air Support Group, 908th Tactical Airlift Group, 908 Airlift Group), 11 February 1963
- 908th Operations Group, 1 August 1992 – 20 July 2025

=== Stations ===
- Geiger Field, Washington, 1 June 1942
- Davis–Monthan Field, Arizona, 23 June 1942
- Wendover Field, Utah, 30 July 1942
- Pueblo Army Air Base, Colorado, 30 September 1942
- Davis–Monthan Field, Arizona, 1 December 1942
- Clovis Army Air Field, New Mexico, 29 January 1943
- Langley Field, Virginia, 17 December 1943
- Chatham Army Air Field, Georgia, 27 January-10 April 1944
- Dalhart Army Air Field, Texas, 7 July 1944
- McCook Army Airfield, Nebraska, 22 November 1944 – 8 April 1945
- Northwest Field, Guam, Mariana Islands, 12 May 1945 – 15 April 1946
- Clinton County Air Force Base, Ohio, 14 June 1952
- Donaldson Air Force Base, South Carolina, 16 November 1957
- New Orleans Naval Air Station, Louisiana, 25 March 1958
- Bates Field, Alabama, 8 May 1961
- Brookley Air Force Base, Alabama, 1 October 1964
- Maxwell Air Force Base, Alabama, 25 April 1969 – 20 July 2025

=== Aircraft ===
- Consolidated B-24 Liberator (1942–1944)
- Boeing B-17 Flying Fortress (1944)
- Boeing B-29 Superfortress (1945–1946)
- Curtiss C-46 Commando (1952–1957)
- Fairchild C-119 Flying Boxcar (1956–1969)
- Cessna U-3 Blue Canoe (1969–1970)
- Cessna O-2 Skymaster (1970–1971)
- de Havilland Canada C-7 Caribou (1971–1983)
- Lockheed C-130 Hercules (1983 – 2025)

=== Awards and campaigns ===
Award streamer	Award	Dates	Notes
	Distinguished Unit Citation	22–29 July 1945	Japan, 357th Bombardment Squadron
	Air Force Outstanding Unit Award	1 July 1972–15 March 1974	357th Tactical Airlift Squadron
	Air Force Outstanding Unit Award	1 January 1976–30 November 1977	357th Tactical Airlift Squadron
	Air Force Outstanding Unit Award	1 February 1980–31 January 1982	357th Airlift Squadron
	Air Force Outstanding Unit Award	1 September 1986–31 August 1988	357th Airlift Squadron
	Air Force Outstanding Unit Award	1 September 1991–31 August 1993	357th Airlift Squadron
	Air Force Outstanding Unit Award	1 October 2003–30 September 2005	357th Airlift Squadron
	Air Force Outstanding Unit Award	1 October 2009–30 September 2011	357th Airlift Squadron
	Air Force Outstanding Unit Award	1 October 2009–30 September 2011	357th Airlift Squadron

Campaign Streamer	Campaign	Dates	Notes
	American Theater without inscription	1 June 1943 – 1 April 1944, 7 July 1944 – 8 April 1945	357th Bombardment Squadron
	Air Offensive, Japan	12 May 1945 – 2 September 1945	357th Bombardment Squadron
	Western Pacific	12 May 1945 – 2 September 1945	357th Bombardment Squadron
	Eastern Mandates	June 1945–July 1945 (Note: Credit awarded for actual combat in theater outside dates of campaign. Maurer, Combat Squadrons, p. 802.)	357th Bombardment Squadron

== See also ==
- List of United States Air Force airlift squadrons
- B-17 Flying Fortress units of the United States Army Air Forces
- B-24 Liberator units of the United States Army Air Forces
- List of B-29 Superfortress operators
- List of C-130 Hercules operators
