= 302nd Airlift Wing =

Air Reserve Component of the United States Air Force

302nd Airlift Wing

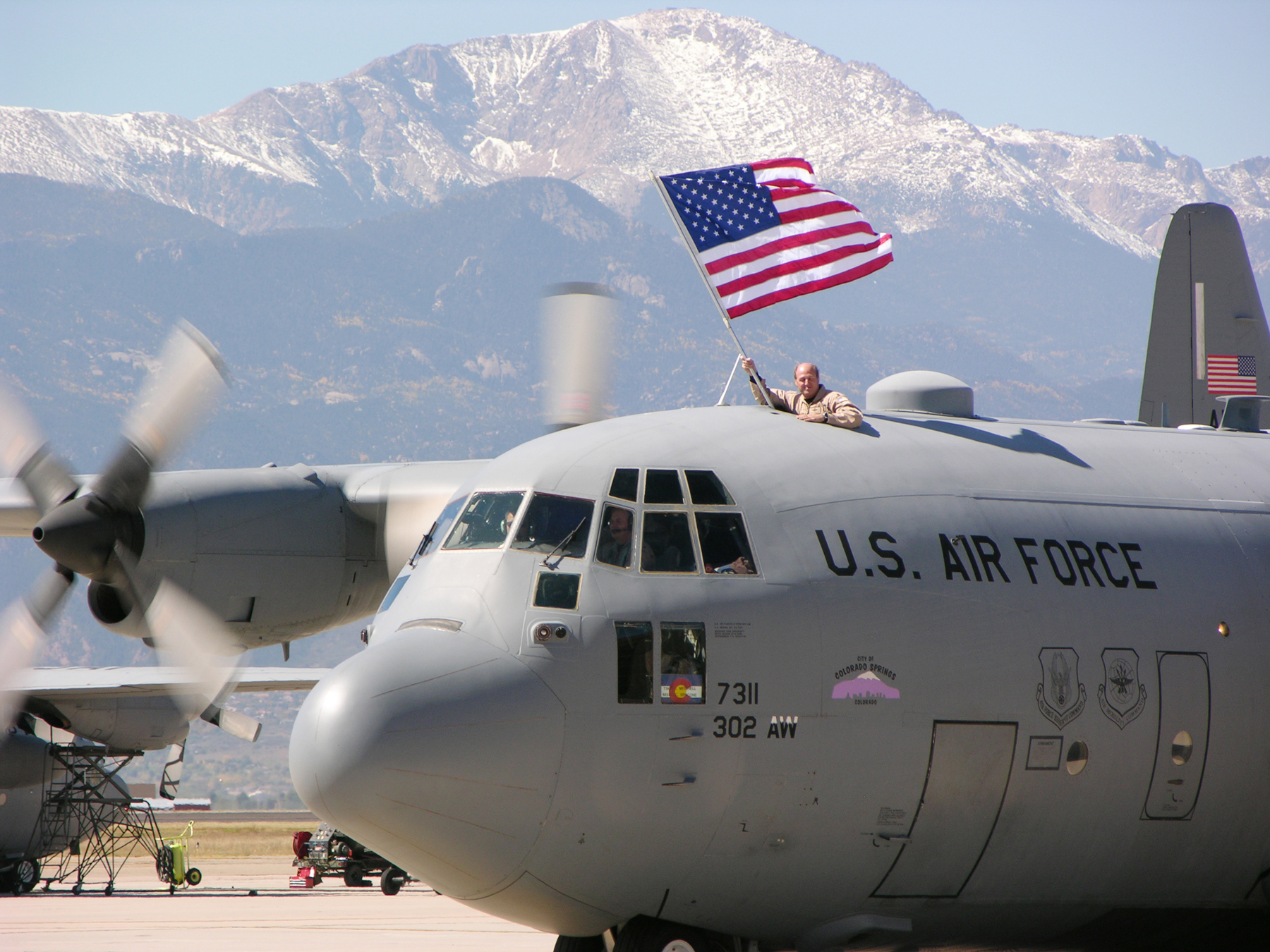
- Wing C-130 Hercules with Pikes Peak in the background
- Active: 1949–1951; 1952–1981; 1985–present
- Country: United States
- Branch: United States Air Force
- Role: Air transport
- Part of: Air Force Reserve Command
- Garrison/HQ: Peterson Space Force Base
- Nicknames: Justem et tenacem (Latin for 'Just and Resolute')
- Decorations: Air Force Outstanding Unit Award; Republic of Vietnam Gallantry Cross with Palm

Commanders
- Current commander: Colonel Elissa D. Grandersen (2025)

Insignia
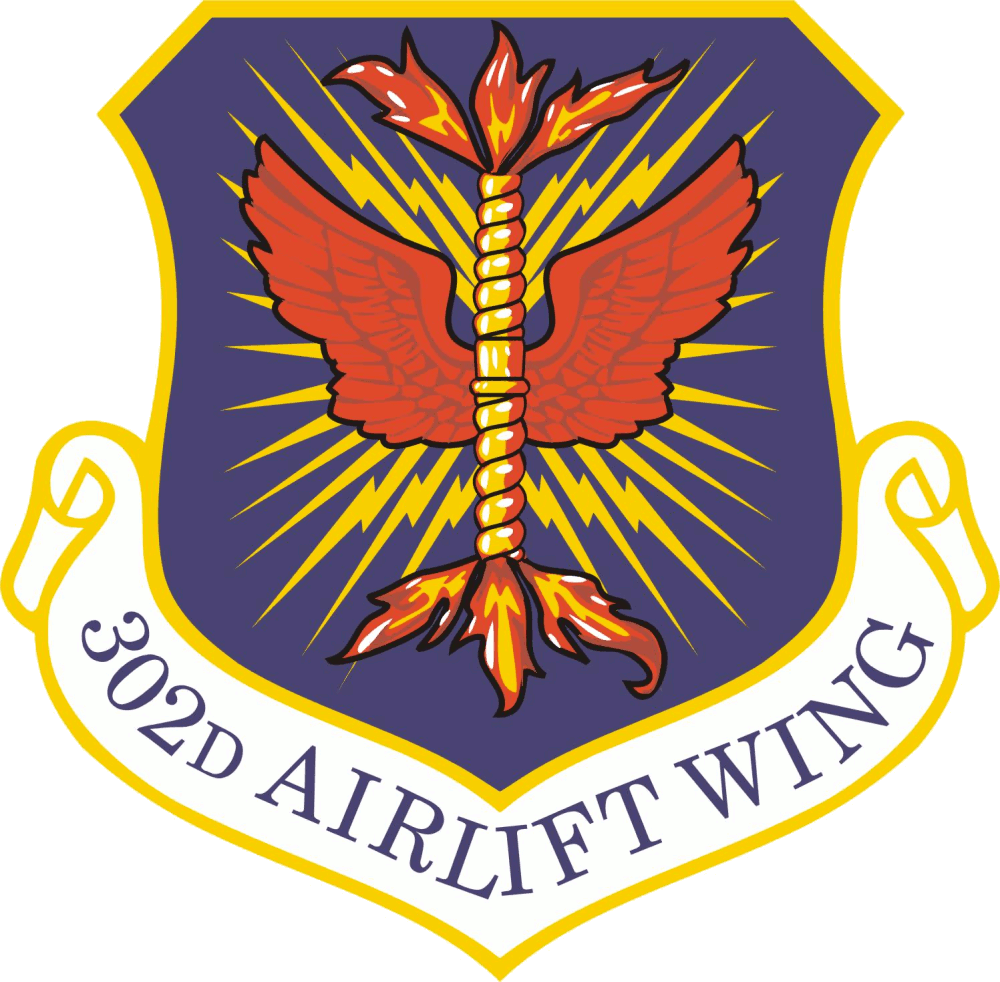
- 302nd Airlift Wing emblem (Note: Approved 23 April 1954. Description: Azure, a thunderbolt in pale, irradiated or, inflamed proper, winged gules. Ravenstein, p. 149.)

The 302d Airlift Wing is an Air Reserve Component of the United States Air Force. It is assigned to Twenty-Second Air Force, Air Force Reserve Command, stationed at Peterson Space Force Base, Colorado.

The wing's mission is tactical airlift and airdrop. The wing also has the specialized mission of Modular Airborne Fire Fighting System, as well as an aeromedical evacuation mission, which was added in April 2008. It is assigned to Air Force Reserve Command, headquartered at Robins Air Force Base, Georgia. If it is called to active duty, the wing would become part of Air Mobility Command at Scott Air Force Base, Illinois.

== History ==
=== Corollary unit and Korean War mobilization ===
The May 1949 Air Force Reserve program called for a new type of unit, the Corollary unit, which was a reserve unit integrated with an active duty unit. The plan called for corollary units at 107 locations and was viewed as the best method to train reservists by mixing them with an existing regular unit to perform duties alongside the regular unit. The wing was activated at McChord Air Force Base, Washington in June as the 302d Troop Carrier Wing and conducted airlift training as a reserve corollary unit of the 62d Troop Carrier Wing until May 1950, when McChord transferred to Air Defense Command (ADC) and then the wing became a corollary of the 325th Fighter-Interceptor Wing, the new host wing at McChord. In August 1950, Continental Air Command (ConAC) transferred control of corollary units to the commands training the units and the wing was reassigned to ADC's Western Air Defense Force.

The wing, along with all reserve corollary units was mobilized for the Korean War. The 302d was mobilized on 1 June 1951. Its personnel were used as fillers for other units, and it was inactivated a week later.

=== Troop Carrier operations ===
The wing was again activated in June 1952 at Clinton County Air Force Base, Ohio, when it replaced the 910th Reserve Training Wing and absorbed the 910th's personnel. The reserve mobilization for the Korean war had left the reserves without aircraft, and the unit did not receive aircraft until July 1952. Once it began to receive Curtiss C-46 Commandos, it trained as a reserve troop carrier wing.

The 302d began flying airlift operations in the mid-1950s. In the summer of 1956, the wing participated in Operation Sixteen Ton during its two weeks of active duty training. Sixteen Ton was performed entirely by reserve troop carrier units and moved United States Coast Guard equipment From Naval Air Station New York / Floyd Bennett Field to Isla Grande Airport in Puerto Rico and San Salvador in the Bahamas. After the success of this operation, the wing began to use inactive duty training periods for Operation Swift Lift, transporting high priority cargo for the Air Force and Operation Ready Swap, transporting aircraft engines between Air Materiel Command's depots.

Training for the wing was supervised by the active duty 2252d Air Reserve Flying Center. In 1958, the 2252d Center was inactivated and some of its personnel were absorbed by the wing. In place of active duty support for reserve units, ConAC adopted the Air Reserve Technician program, in which a cadre of the unit consisted of full-time personnel who were simultaneously civilian employees of the Air Force and also held military rank as members of the reserves.

In April 1959, the wing reorganized under the Dual Deputy system. Its 302d Troop Carrier Group was inactivated and the 355th and 356th Troop Carrier Squadrons were assigned directly to the wing.

=== Dispersed squadrons ===
Starting in late 1955, ConAC began to disperse some of its reserve flying squadrons to separate bases in order to improve recruiting and avoid public objection to entire wings of aircraft being stationed near large population centers under what was called the Detached Squadron Concept. Although the wing's 355th and 356th Troop Carrier Squadrons remained with the wing headquarters at Clinton County, when a third squadron, the 357th Troop Carrier Squadron, was activated in 1961 and assigned to the wing, it was stationed at Bates Field, Alabama.

=== Activation of groups under the wing ===
Although the dispersal of flying units was not a problem when the entire wing was called to active service, mobilizing a single flying squadron and elements to support it proved difficult. This weakness was demonstrated in the partial mobilization of reserve units during the Berlin Crisis of 1961 To resolve this, at the start of 1962, ConAC determined to reorganize its reserve wings by establishing groups with support elements for each of its troop carrier squadrons. This reorganization would facilitate mobilization of elements of wings in various combinations when needed. However, as this plan was entering its implementation phase, another partial mobilization, which included the 302d Wing, occurred for the Cuban Missile Crisis. The formation of troop carrier groups was delayed until February 1963 for wings that had been mobilized. The 906th and 907th Troop Carrier Group at Clinton County, and the 908th Troop Carrier Group at Bates Field were all assigned to the wing on 11 February.

=== Airlift operations ===
By the mid-1960s, wing aircraft and crews performed worldwide airlift missions and participated in numerous tactical exercises. From April 1968 to March 1973 the wing provided AC-119 gunship training for pilots, navigators, flight engineers, and mechanics of USAF active units and personnel from Jordan, Morocco, Ethiopia, and South Vietnam. The wing assumed a rotational airlift task in support of USAF Southern Command from April 1973 through January 1976. Also in April 1973, the wing assumed an aerial spraying mission with UC-123 aircraft, which frequently took wing crews to Central America, the Caribbean, the Azores, North Africa, islands of the Pacific, and to many U.S. points for insect-spraying missions.

Beginning in April 1985, the wing trained to airlift and airdrop troops, equipment, and supplies in a tactical theater. It took part in training and mobility exercises within the United States and to Britain and Panama. It practiced for aeromedical evacuation missions. During the late 1980s and 1990s, the wing transported fire fighters and their equipment and supplies to fight wildfires in western states, delivered relief supplies to hurricane victims, and participated in other humanitarian airlifts and various global contingency operations. The 302d was most recently activated in support of U.S. Central Command operations in Southwest Asia in 2005–2006. In the summer of 2008, two C-130 aircraft and aircrews deployed to Southwest Asia. Other units within the 302d have also deployed, including the 302d Security Forces Squadron, which deployed Airmen in the summer of 2008. Later in the spring of 2009, members of the 302d Civil Engineer Squadron deployed as well. Both units were deployed to Kirkuk Regional Air Base, Iraq.

In October 2009, the 52d Airlift Squadron stood up as an Active-Associate unit under the 302d Operations Group. The unit, a regular Air Force squadron consisting of Active-Duty Airmen, is assigned to the 19th Airlift Wing at Little Rock Air Force Base, Arkansas. Personnel are integrated with reserve members to fly and maintain the wing's assigned aircraft.

=== MAFFS aerial fire-fighting mission ===
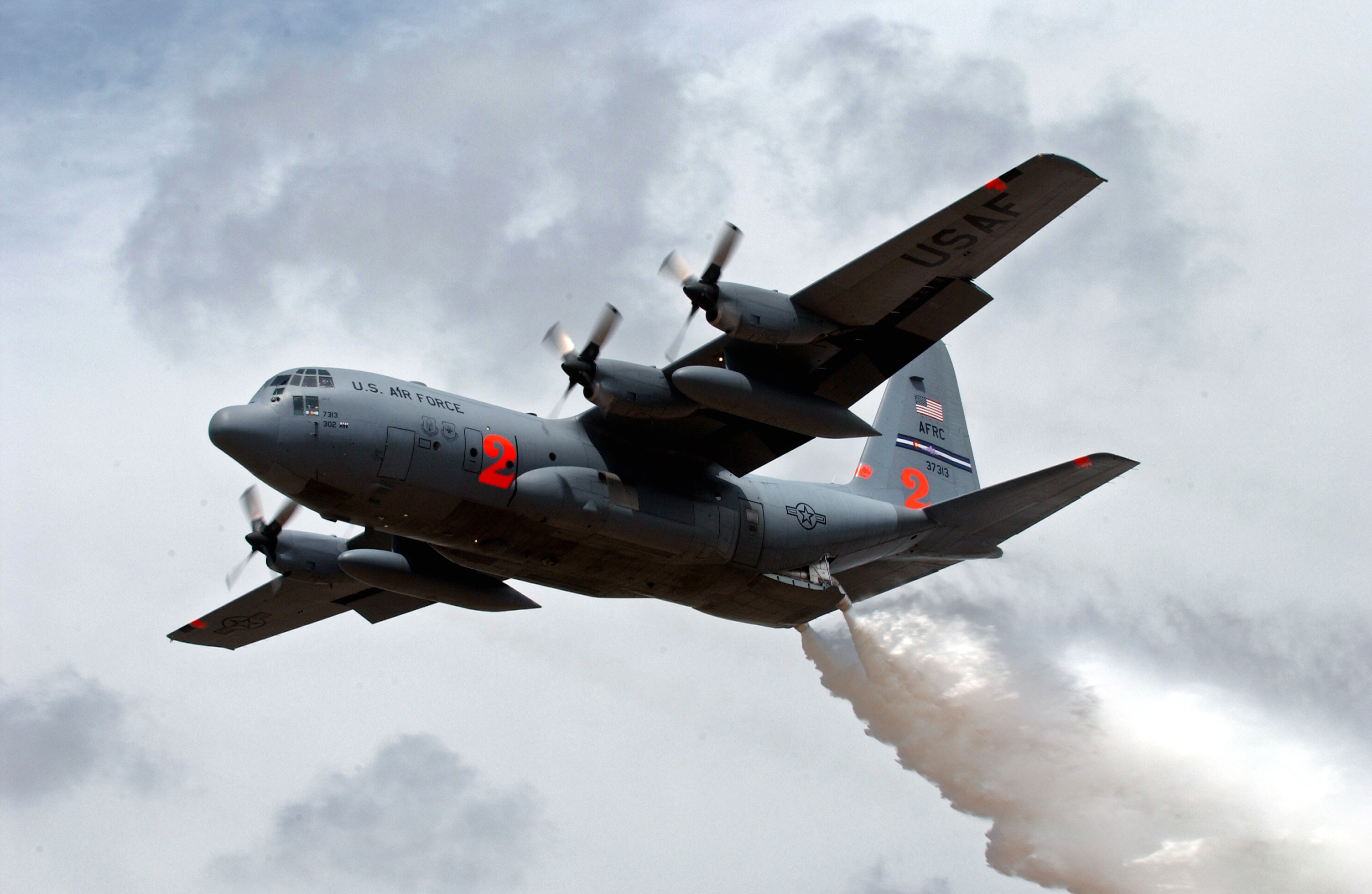
302d AW C-130H training to fight wildfires with the MAFFS system

The 302d also provides training, crews, and aircraft in cooperation with the US Forest Service and National Interagency Fire Center to operate Modular Airborne Fire Fighting System-equipped C-130s to combat wildfires. Two of the unit's C-130H3 are on standby with the Modular Airborne Fire Fighting System installed and have another two empty C-130H3 aircraft are in reserve. It is the only Air Force Reserve unit that maintains this capability.

While six separate MAFFS II units are utilized by three other participating MAFFS Air Expeditionary Group (AEG) wings (146th Airlift Wing, 152nd Airlift Wing, 153rd Airlift Wing), 302d Airlift Wing aircraft, crews and MAFFS II systems are identified by the blaze-orange MAFFS 2 and MAFFS 5 aircraft fuselage and tail markings. The Aero Union designed MAFFS II system can discharge its load of 3,000 gallons weighing 27,000 pounds in less than five seconds or can make incremental drops for multiple passes. The retardant can cover an area one-quarter of a mile long and 100 feet wide. After the aircraft discharges its Phos-Chek retardant or water load, it can be rapidly refilled at tanker ground bases in less than twelve minutes for expedited wildfire re-attack.

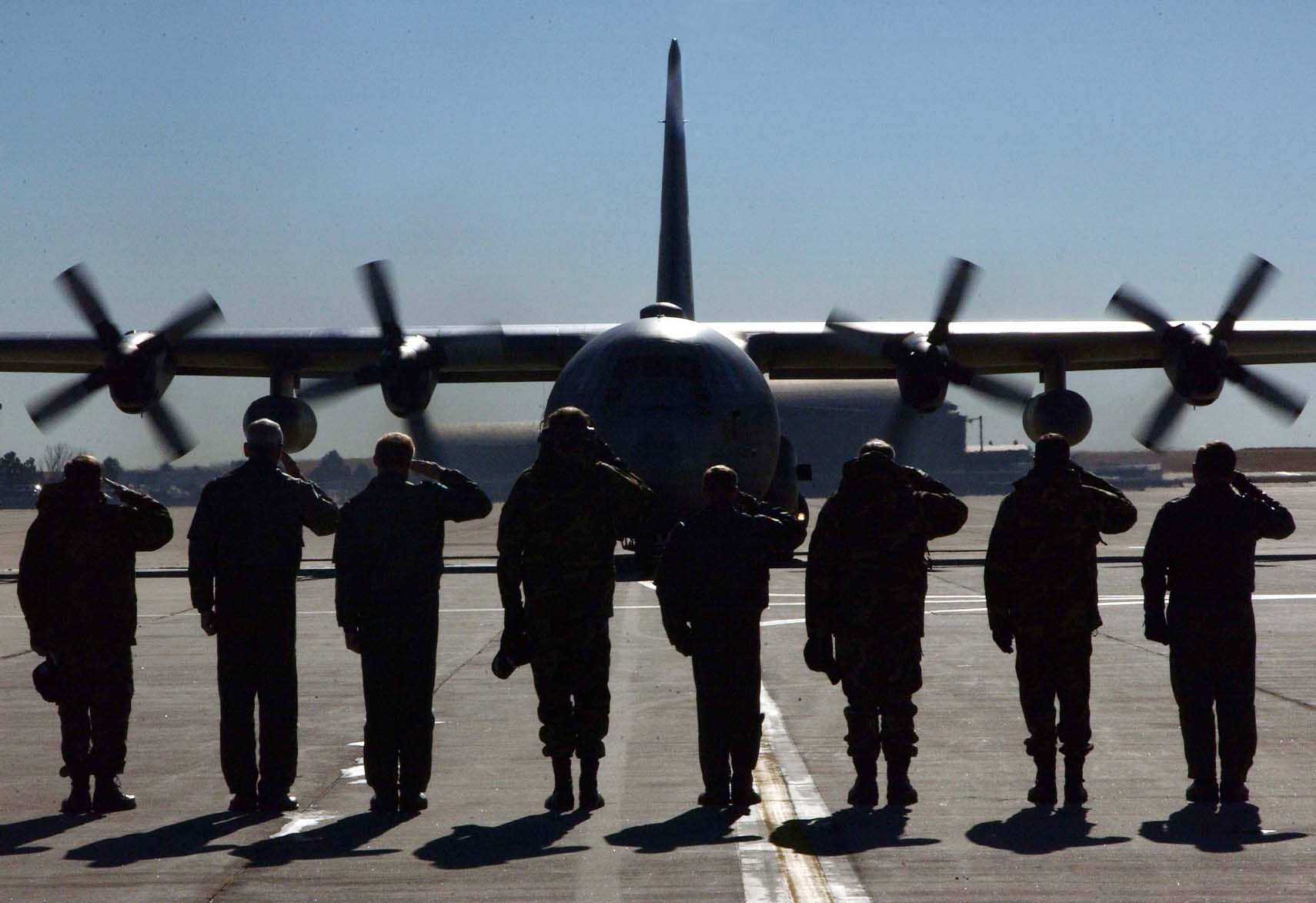
C-130 preparing to leave on a deployment

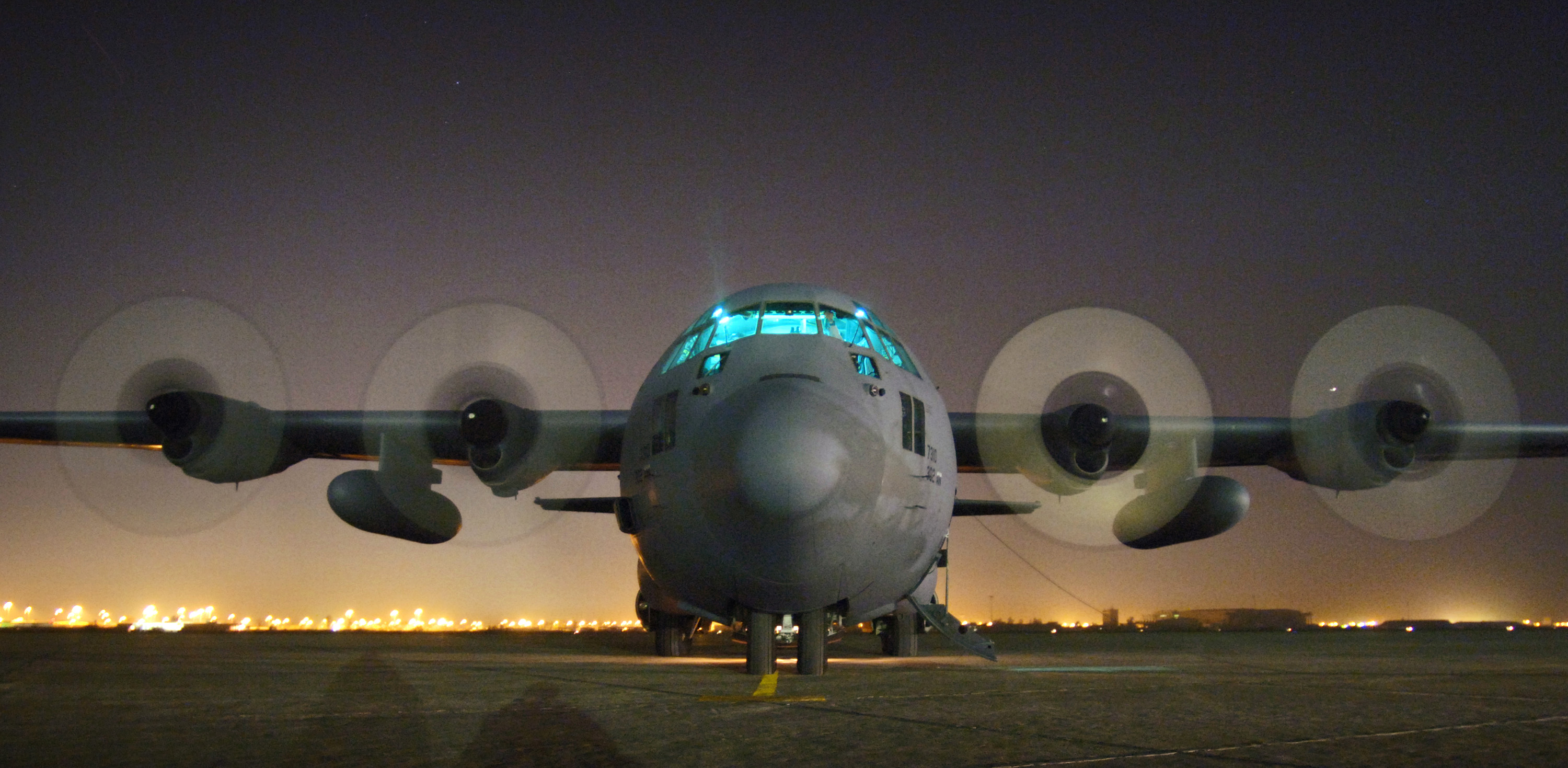
C-130 at Sather Air Base (military enclave of Baghdad International Airport), Iraq

=== Notable incidents ===
On 13 May 1995, aircraft 62-1838, callsign "Sumit 38", with six people aboard, caught fire approximately 45 miles east of Mountain Home Air Force Base, Idaho, after ferrying firefighters to Gowen Field.

The number two engine incorrectly signaled an under temperature reading, causing the flight engineer to enrich the fuel mixture to that engine, leading to an actual over temperature situation. The engine caught fire, and after two attempts by one of the flight crew to quench the fire, the engine reignited causing SUMIT38 to fall 26,000 feet to the ground, killing its six crew members.

The six crew members of SUMIT38 were:
Lieutenant Colonel Robert "Bob" Buckout, Aircraft Commander
First Lieutenant Lance Dougherty, Pilot
Captain Geoff Boyd, Navigator
Chief Master Sergeant Jimmie Vail, Flight Engineer
Master Sergeant Jay Kemp, Loadmaster
Staff Sergeant Michael Lynn Scheideman, Loadmaster

A memorial at Peterson AFB, Colorado, was dedicated to the crew on the 10th anniversary of the crash in May 2005. Several stones, placards and flags are occasionally replaced at the actual crash site, near Bliss, Idaho, by well-wishers, recovery crew, and family members of the crew.

=== Units in the late 2010s ===
- 302d Operations Group
- 731st Airlift Squadron
- 34th Aeromedical Evacuation Squadron
- 302d Maintenance Group
- 302d Mission Support Group
- 302d Aeromedical Staging Squadron

== Lineage ==
- Established as the 302d Troop Carrier Wing, Medium on 16 May 1949

Activated in the reserve on 27 June 1949
Redesignated 302d Troop Carrier Wing, Heavy on 28 January 1950
Ordered to active service on 1 June 1951
Inactivated on 8 June 1951

- Redesignated 302d Troop Carrier Wing, Medium on 26 May 1952

Activated in the reserve on 14 June 1952
Ordered to active service on 28 October 1962
Relieved from active service on 28 November 1962
Redesignated 302d Tactical Airlift Wing on 1 July 1967
Redesignated 302d Special Operations Wing on 1 July 1970
Redesignated 302d Tactical Airlift Wing on 2 August 1971
Inactivated on 1 April 1981

- Activated in the reserve on 1 April 1985

Redesignated 302d Airlift Wing on 1 February 1992.

=== Assignments ===
- Fourth Air Force, 27 June 1949 (attached to 62d Troop Carrier Wing until 5 May 1950, then to 325th Fighter-All Weather Wing)
- Western Air Defense Force, 1 August 1950 – 8 June 1951 (remained attached to 325th Fighter-All Weather Wing (later 325th Fighter-Interceptor Wing))
- First Air Force, 14 June 1952
- Fourteenth Air Force, 25 March 1958
- Second Air Force Reserve Region, 15 August 1960
- Ninth Air Force, 28 October 1962
- Second Air Force Reserve Region, 28 November 1962
- First Air Force Reserve Region, 24 January 1966
- Eastern Air Force Reserve Region, 31 December 1969
- Fourteenth Air Force, 8 October 1976 – 1 April 1981
- Fourth Air Force, 1 April 1985
- Tenth Air Force, 1 July 1994
- Twenty-Second Air Force, 1 April 1997 – present

=== Components ===
Groups

- 302d Troop Carrier Group (later 302d Operations Group): 27 June 1949 – 8 June 1951; 14 June 1952 – 14 April 1959; 1 August 1992 – present
- 901st Military Airlift Group (later 901st Tactical Airlift Group): 1 July 1972 – 1 April 1974
- 906th Troop Carrier Group (later 906th Tactical Airlift Group) 11 February 1963 – 1 September 1975
- 907th Troop Carrier Group (later 907th Tactical Airlift Group): 11 February 1963 – 1 September 1975
- 908th Troop Carrier Group (later 908th Tactical Airlift Group): 11 February – 18 Mar 1963; attached 1 – 24 October 1971, assigned 25 October 1971 – 1 July 1972
- 910th Troop Carrier Group (later 910th Tactical Airlift Group, 910 Tactical Air Support Group): 1 July 1966 – 15 February 1970
- 911th Military Airlift Group (later 911th Tactical Airlift Group): 25 February 1972 – 1 October 1980
- 912th Troop Carrier Group: 8 January 1965 – 1 July 1966
- 913th Troop Carrier Group (later 913th Tactical Airlift Group): 8 January 1965 – 1 July 1966; attached 30 June-16 Sep 1970, assigned 17 September 1970 – 21 April 1971 (detached after 1 April 1971)
- 914th Troop Carrier Group (later 914th Tactical Airlift Group): 1 July 1966 – 1 September 1969 (detached after 31 July 1969)
- 930th Special Operations Group: 31 December 1969 – 1 June 1970
- 934th Tactical Airlift Group (later 934th Airlift Group): 1 April 1985 – 31 December 1987; 1 August 1992 – 1 October 1994
- 943d Tactical Airlift Group: 1 April 1985 – 1 February 1992

Squadrons

- 1st Combat Crew Training Squadron (later 1st Tactical Airlift Training Squadron): 1 July 1968 – 25 March 1973
- 7th Space Operations Squadron: 1 January – 1 May 1993
- Combat Crew Training Squadron Provisional, 302d: attached 1 April – 1 August 1968 (not operational after 1 July 1968)
- 355th Troop Carrier Squadron (later 355th Tactical Airlift Squadron): 14 April 1959 – 11 February 1963; 1 September 1975 – 1 April 1981
- 356th Troop Carrier Squadron (later 356th Tactical Airlift Squadron): 14 April 1959 – 11 February 1963; 1 September 1975 – 1 April 1981
- 357th Troop Carrier Squadron: 8 May 1961 – 11 February 1963
- 731st Tactical Airlift Squadron (later 731st Airlift Squadron): 1 April 1985 – 1 August 1992

=== Stations ===
- McChord Air Force Base, Washington, 27 June 1949 – 8 June 1951
- Clinton County Air Force Base, Ohio 14 June 1952 – 2 August 1971
- Lockbourne Air Force Base (later Rickenbacker Air Force Base), Ohio, 2 August 1971 – 1 April 1981
- Peterson Air Force Base (later Peterson Space Force Base), Colorado, 1 April 1985 – present

=== Aircraft ===
- Fairchild C-82 Packet, 1949
- Douglas C-54 Skymaster, 1949–1950
- Curtiss C-46 Commando, 1952–1957
- Fairchild C-119 Flying Boxcar, 1956–1973
- Cessna U-3 Blue Canoe, 1970, 1971–1972
- Lockheed C-130 Hercules, 1970–1971, 1985–present
- Cessna A-37 Dragonfly, 1970
- Fairchild C-123 Provider, 1971–1981
- de Havilland Canada C-7 Caribou, 1972
- Fairchild UC-123 Provider, 1973–1981
