= 906th Fighter Group =

906th Fighter Group

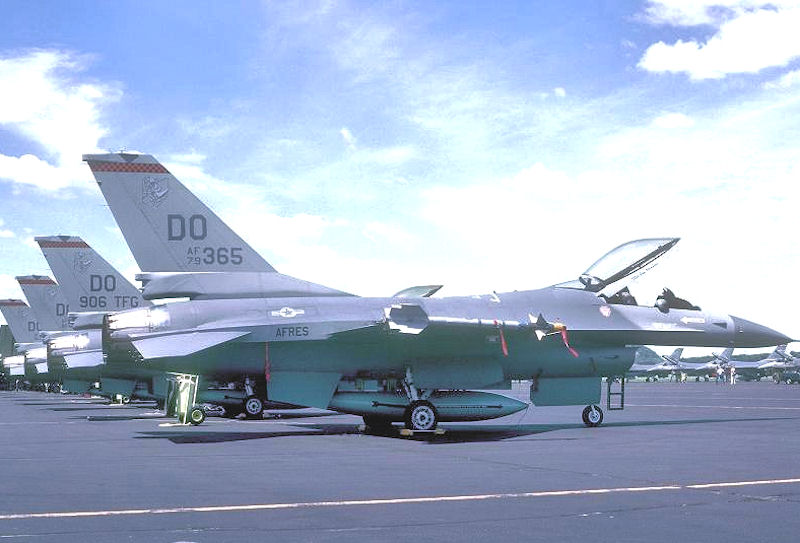
- F-16s of the 906th Fighter Group at Wright-Patterson AFB (Note: General Dynamics F-16A Block 10A Fighting Falcon serial 79-365 is in the foreground. This aircraft was retired in 1994 to AMARC. Taken about 1990.)
- Active: 1962-1975; 1982-1994
- Country: United States
- Branch: United States Air Force
- Role: Fighter

Insignia
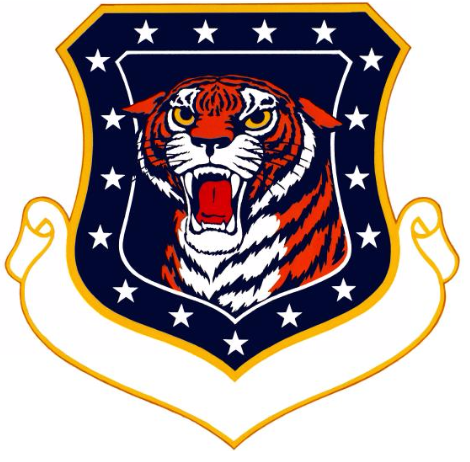
- 906th Tactical Fighter Group emblem (approved 1983)

The 906th Fighter Group is an inactive United States Air Force Reserve unit. It was last active with the 445th Airlift Wing, at Wright-Patterson Air Force Base, Ohio, where it was inactivated on 1 October 1994.

== History ==
=== Need for reserve troop carrier groups ===
During the first half of 1955, the Air Force began detaching Air Force Reserve squadrons from their parent wing locations to separate sites. The concept offered several advantages. Communities were more likely to accept the smaller squadrons than the large wings and the location of separate squadrons in smaller population centers would facilitate recruiting and manning. Continental Air Command (ConAC)'s plan called for placing Air Force Reserve units at fifty-nine installations located throughout the United States. When these relocations were completed in 1959, reserve wing headquarters and wing support elements would typically be on one base, along with one (or in some cases two) of the wing's flying squadrons, while the remaining flying squadrons were spread over thirty-five Air Force, Navy and civilian airfields under what was called the Detached Squadron Concept.

Although this dispersal was not a problem when the entire wing was called to active service, mobilizing a single flying squadron and elements to support it proved difficult. This weakness was demonstrated in the partial mobilization of reserve units during the Berlin Crisis of 1961 To resolve this, at the start of 1962, Continental Air Command, (ConAC) determined to reorganize its reserve wings by establishing groups with support elements for each of its troop carrier squadrons. This reorganization would facilitate mobilization of elements of wings in various combinations when needed. However, as this plan was entering its implementation phase, another partial mobilization occurred for the Cuban Missile Crisis, with the units being released on 22 November 1962. The formation of troop carrier groups occurred in January 1963 for units that had not been mobilized, but was delayed until February for those that had been.

=== Activation of 906th Troop Carrier Group ===
As a result, the 906th Troop Carrier Group was established at Clinton County Air Force Base, Ohio on 11 February 1963, as the headquarters for the 355th Troop Carrier Squadron, which had been stationed there since June 1952. Along with group headquarters, a Combat Support Squadron, Materiel Squadron and a Tactical Infirmary were organized to support the 355th.

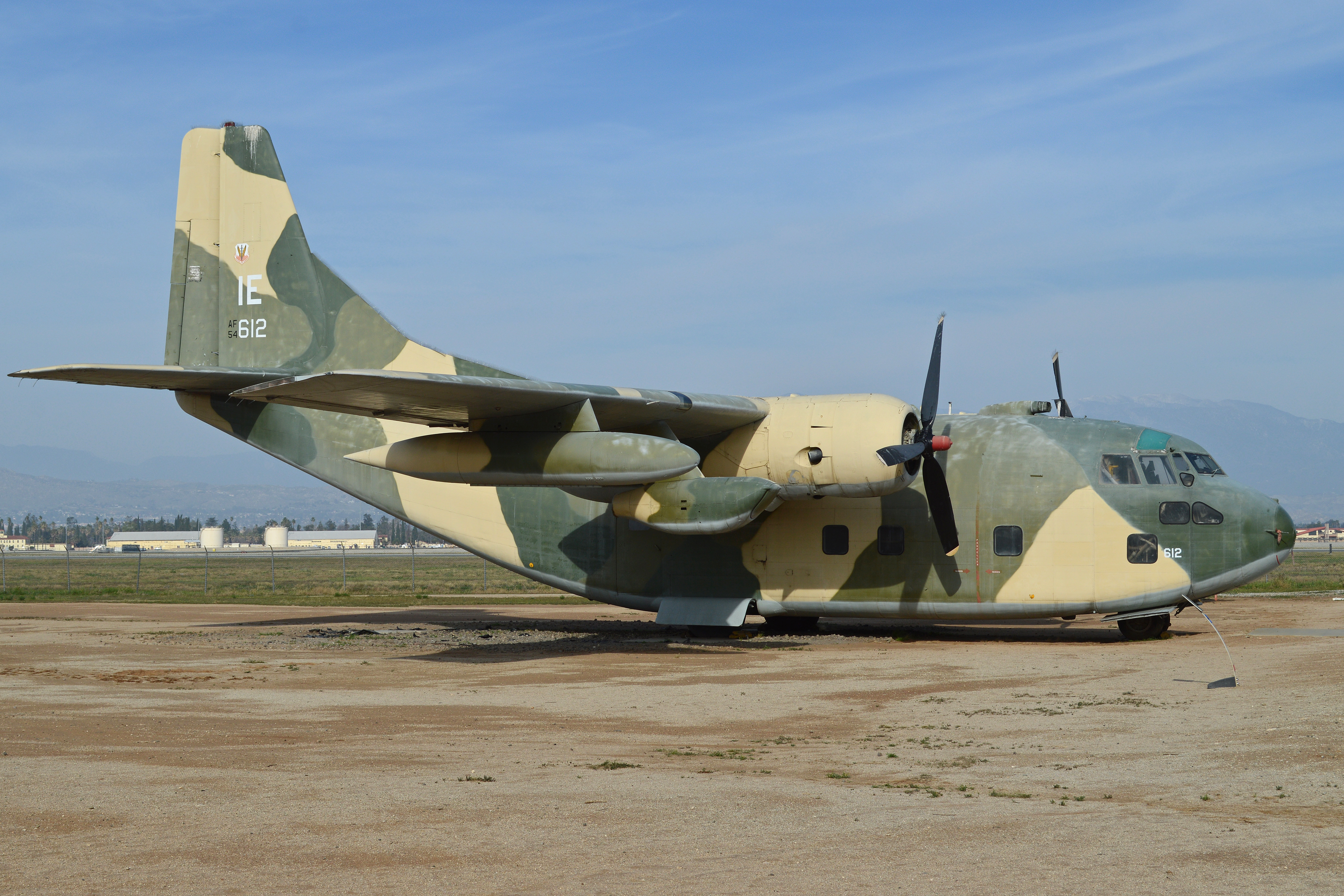
Group Fairchild C-123K Provider

The 906th Troop Carrier Group was one of two Fairchild C-119 Flying Boxcargroups assigned to the 302d Troop Carrier Wing in 1963, the other being the 907th Troop Carrier Group also at Clinton County. It replaced its C-119s with Fairchild C-123 Provider assault transport in 1967, began training with special operations forces when parent 302d Tactical Airlift Wing was redesignated as a Special Operations Wing in 1970. Inactivated in 1975 as part of post-Vietnam War drawdown.

=== Fighter operations ===
Reactivated in 1981 as a Fairchild UC-123K Provider reserve squadron at Rickenbacker Air National Guard Base, Ohio for aerial spraying operations. Re-aligned to a McDonnell F-4 Phantom II tactical fighter unit in 1982 at Wright-Patterson Air Force Base. Its F-4Ds came from the 704th Tactical Fighter Squadron at Bergstrom Air Force Base, Texas. Carried Tail Code "DO", aligned to Tactical Air Command.

Was upgraded to F-16A/B Falcons in 1989 as part of the retirement of the Phantom II, receiving F-16s from inactivating 474th Tactical Fighter Wing at Nellis Air Force Base, Nevada.

It was inactivated in 1994 as part of post-Cold War drawdown. Replaced by 445th Operations Group with the 89th Fighter Squadron.

== Lineage ==
- Established as the 906th Troop Carrier Group, Medium and activated on 15 January 1963 (not organized)

Organized in the Reserve on 11 February 1963
Redesignated 906th Tactical Airlift Group on 1 July 1967
Redesignated 906th Special Operations Group on 25 January 1970
Redesignated 906th Tactical Airlift Group on 26 July 1971
Inactivated on 1 September 1975

- Activated in the Reserve on 1 April 1981

Redesignated 906th Tactical Fighter Group on 1 July 1982
Redesignated 906th Fighter Group on 1 February 1992
Inactivated on 1 October 1994

=== Assignments ===
- Continental Air Command, 15 January 1963
- 302d Troop Carrier Wing (later 302d Tactical Airlift Wing, 302d Special Operations Wing, 302d Tactical Airlift Wing), 11 February 1963 – 1 Sep 1975
- 94th Tactical Airlift Wing, 1 April 1981 – 1 July 1982

445th Military Airlift Wing (later 445th Airlift Wing), 1 July 1982 – 1 October 1994

=== Components ===
- 355th Troop Carrier Squadron (later 355th Tactical Airlift Squadron, 355th Special Operations Squadron, 355th Tactical Airlift Squadron), 11 February 1963–1 Sep 1975; 1 April 1981 – 1 July 1982
- 89th Tactical Fighter Squadron, 1 July 1982 – 1 October 1994

=== Stations ===
- Clinton County Air Force Base, Ohio, 11 February 1963
- Lockbourne Air Force Base (later Rickenbacker Air Force Base), Ohio, 2 August 1971 – 1 September 1975
- Rickenbacker Air National Guard Base, Ohio, 1 April 1981 – 1 July 1982.
- Wright-Patterson Air Force Base, Ohio, 1 July 1982 – 1 October 1994

=== Aircraft ===
- Fairchild C-119 Flying Boxcar, 1963–1967
- Fairchild C-123 Provider, 1967–1975
- Fairchild UC-123K Provider, 1981–1982
- McDonnell F-4D Phantom II, 1982–1989
- General Dynamics F-16A Fighting Falcon, 1989–1994

== Notes ==
=== Bibliography ===
- Martin, Patrick (1994). Tail Code: The Complete History of USAF Tactical Aircraft Tail Code Markings. Atglen, PA: Schiffer Military Aviation History. ISBN 0-88740-513-4.
- Maurer, Maurer, ed. (1982) [1969]. Combat Squadrons of the Air Force, World War II (PDF) (reprint ed.). Washington, DC: Office of Air Force History. ISBN 0-405-12194-6. LCCN 70605402. OCLC 72556. Archived from the original (PDF) on 20 December 2016.
- Ravenstein, Charles A. (1984). Air Force Combat Wings, Lineage & Honors Histories 1947-1977. Washington, DC: Office of Air Force History. ISBN 0-912799-12-9.
- Rogers, Brian. (2005). United States Air Force Unit Designations Since 1978. Hinkley, UK: Midland Publications. ISBN 1-85780-197-0.
