= 907th Airlift Group =

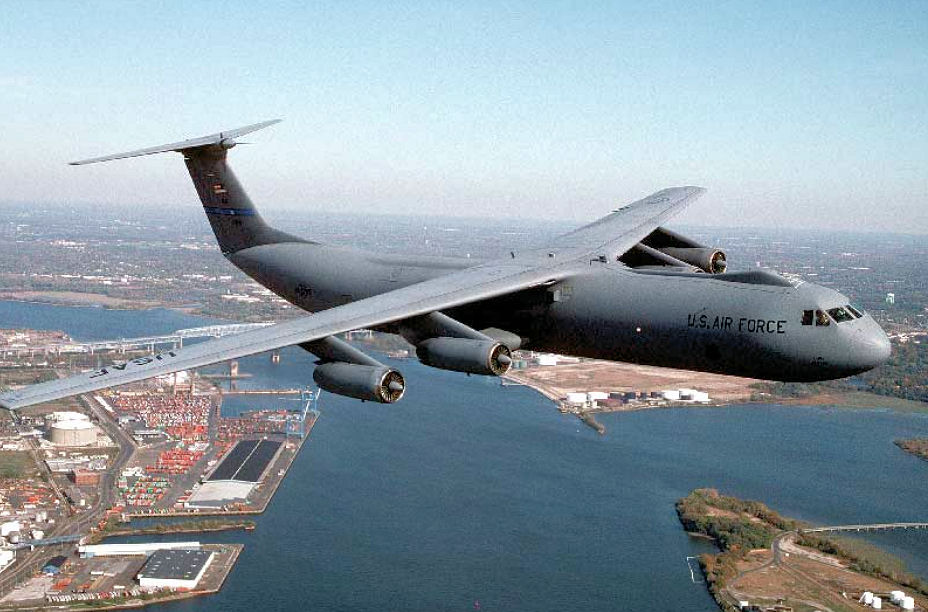
- C-141 Starlifter as flown by the group
- Active: 1963-1975; 1981-1994
- Country: United States
- Branch: United States Air Force
- Role: Airlift

Insignia
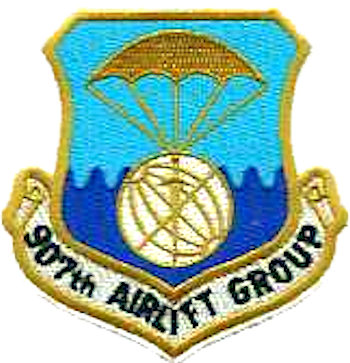
- Patch with 907th Airlift Group emblem

The 907th Airlift Group is an inactive United States Air Force Reserve unit. It was last active with the 445th Airlift Wing, based at Wright-Patterson Air Force Base, Ohio, and was inactivated on 1 October 1994.

The group was first activated as the 907th Troop Carrier Group on 15 January 1963 at Clinton County Air Force Base, Ohio, flying the Fairchild C-119 Flying Boxcar and later the Fairchild C-123 Provider in the tactical airlift role. It was inactivated in 1975 as part of the drawdown following the Vietnam War.

The group was reactivated in 1981 as an aerial spraying unit flying the UC-123K Provider, before converting to the Lockheed C-130A and later C-130E Hercules for tactical airlift duties. It was redesignated the 907th Airlift Group in 1992. In 1993 the group moved to Wright-Patterson Air Force Base and converted to the Lockheed C-141 Starlifter for strategic airlift, flying that aircraft until its inactivation in 1994.

== History ==
=== Need for reserve troop carrier groups ===
During the first half of 1955, the Air Force began detaching Air Force Reserve squadrons from their parent wing locations to separate sites. The concept offered several advantages. Communities were more likely to accept the smaller squadrons than the large wings and the location of separate squadrons in smaller population centers would facilitate recruiting and manning. Continental Air Command (ConAC)'s plan called for placing Air Force Reserve units at fifty-nine installations located throughout the United States. When these relocations were completed in 1959, reserve wing headquarters and wing support elements would typically be on one base, along with one (or in some cases two) of the wing's flying squadrons, while the remaining flying squadrons were spread over thirty-five Air Force, Navy and civilian airfields under what was called the Detached Squadron Concept.

Although this dispersal was not a problem when the entire wing was called to active service, mobilizing a single flying squadron and elements to support it proved difficult. This weakness was demonstrated in the partial mobilization of reserve units during the Berlin Crisis of 1961. To resolve this, at the start of 1962, ConAC determined to reorganize its reserve wings by establishing groups with support elements for each of its troop carrier squadrons. This reorganization would facilitate mobilization of elements of wings in various combinations when needed. However, as this plan was entering its implementation phase, another partial mobilization occurred for the Cuban Missile Crisis, with the units being released on 22 November 1962. The formation of troop carrier groups occurred in January 1963 for units that had not been mobilized, but was delayed until February for those that had been.

=== Activation of 907th Troop Carrier Group ===
As a result, the 907th Troop Carrier Group was established at Clinton County Air Force Base, Ohio on 11 February 1963, as the headquarters for the 356th Troop Carrier Squadron, which had been stationed there since June 1952. Along with group headquarters, a Combat Support Squadron, Materiel Squadron and a Tactical Infirmary were organized to support the 356th.

The group's mission was to organize, recruit and train Air Force Reserve personnel in the tactical airlift of airborne forces, their equipment and supplies and delivery of these forces and materials by airdrop, landing or cargo extraction systems. The group was equipped with Fairchild C-119 Flying Boxcars for Tactical Air Command airlift operations.

The 907th TCG was one of two C-119 groups assigned to the 302d TCW in 1963, the other being the 906th Troop Carrier Group also at Clinton County AFB. Replaced C-119s with Fairchild C-123 Provider assault transport in 1967, began training with special operations forces when parent 302d Tactical Airlift Wing was redesignated as a Special Operations Wing in 1970. Inactivated in 1975 as part of post-Vietnam War drawdown.

=== Aerial Spray ===
Reactivated in 1981 as an UC-123K Provider aerial spraying unit, deployed frequently to Panama and Central America. Retired the C-123s in 1982, however retained four aircraft to spray for insects until June 1986. Tail Code was "NT".

=== C-130 Hercules ===
Was re-equipped with early-model Lockheed C-130A Hercules transports, flying tactical airlift missions to support Tactical Air Command. Re-equipped with newer C-130E models from 337th TAS at Westover Air Force Base in 1987.

=== Heavy airlift ===
Moved to Wright-Patterson Air Force Base in 1993 and upgraded to a Lockheed C-141 Starlifter heavy intercontinental airlift unit, C-130s being transferred to 731st TAS at Peterson Air Force Base. Flew intercontinental airlift missions from WPAFB in support of Military Airlift Command.

Personnel and equipment reassigned to 445th AW after inactivation in October 1994.

== Lineage ==
- Established as the 907th Troop Carrier Group, Medium and activated on 15 January 1963 (not organized)

Organized in the Reserve on 11 February 1963
Redesignated 907th Tactical Airlift Group on 1 July 1967
Redesignated 907th Special Operations Group on 25 June 1970
Redesignated 907th Tactical Airlift Group on 26 July 1971
Inactivated on 1 September 1975
Activated in the Reserve on 1 April 1981
Redesignated 907th Airlift Group on 1 February 1992
Redesignated 907th Airlift Wing on 1 August 1992
Inactivated on 1 October 1994

=== Assignments ===
- Continental Air Command, 15 January 1963 (not organized)
- 302d Troop Carrier Wing (later 302d Tactical Airlift Wing, 302d Special Operations Wing, 302d Tactical Airlift Wing), 11 February 1963–1 Sep 1975
- 94th Tactical Airlift Wing: 1 April 1981
- 459th Military Airlift Wing (later 459th Airlift Wing), 1 October 1989 – 1 October 1994

=== Components ===
- 907th Operations Group, 1 August 1992 – 1 October 1994
- 356th Troop Carrier Squadron (later 356th Tactical Airlift Squadron, 356th Airlift Squadron), 11 February 1963–1 Sep 1975; 1 April 1981 – 1 August 1992

=== Stations ===
- Clinton County Air Force Base, Ohio, 11 February 1963
- Lockbourne Air Force Base (later Rickenbacker Air Force Base), Ohio, 2 August 1971 – 1 September 1975
- Rickenbacker Air National Guard Base, Ohio, 1 April 1981
- Wright-Patterson Air Force Base, Ohio, 1 April 1993 – 1 October 1994

=== Aircraft ===
- Fairchild C-119 Flying Boxcar, 1963–1967
- Fairchild C-123 Provider, 1967–1975
- Fairchild UC-123K Provider, 1981–1982
- Lockheed C-130A Hercules, 1982–1987
- Lockheed C-130E Hercules, 1987–1993
- Lockheed C-141B Starlifter, 1993–1994

== Notes ==
=== Bibliography ===
- Cantwell, Gerald T. (1997). Citizen Airmen: a History of the Air Force Reserve, 1946-1994. Washington, D.C.: Air Force History and Museums Program. ISBN 0-16049-269-6.
- Futrell, Robert F.; Blumenson, Martin (1980). The Advisory Years to 1965. The United States in Southeast Asia. Washington, DC: Office of Air Force History. LCCN 80-24547. Archived from the original (PDF) on 5 November 2021.
- Maurer, Maurer, ed. (1982) [1969]. Combat Squadrons of the Air Force, World War II (PDF) (reprint ed.). Washington, DC: Office of Air Force History. ISBN 0-405-12194-6. LCCN 70605402. OCLC 72556.
- Ravenstein, Charles A. (1984). Air Force Combat Wings, Lineage & Honors Histories 1947-1977. Washington, DC: Office of Air Force History. ISBN 0-912799-12-9.
- Rogers, Brian. (2005). United States Air Force Unit Designations Since 1978. Hinkley, UK: Midland Publications. ISBN 1-85780-197-0.
