= 302nd Operations Group =

302d Operations Group

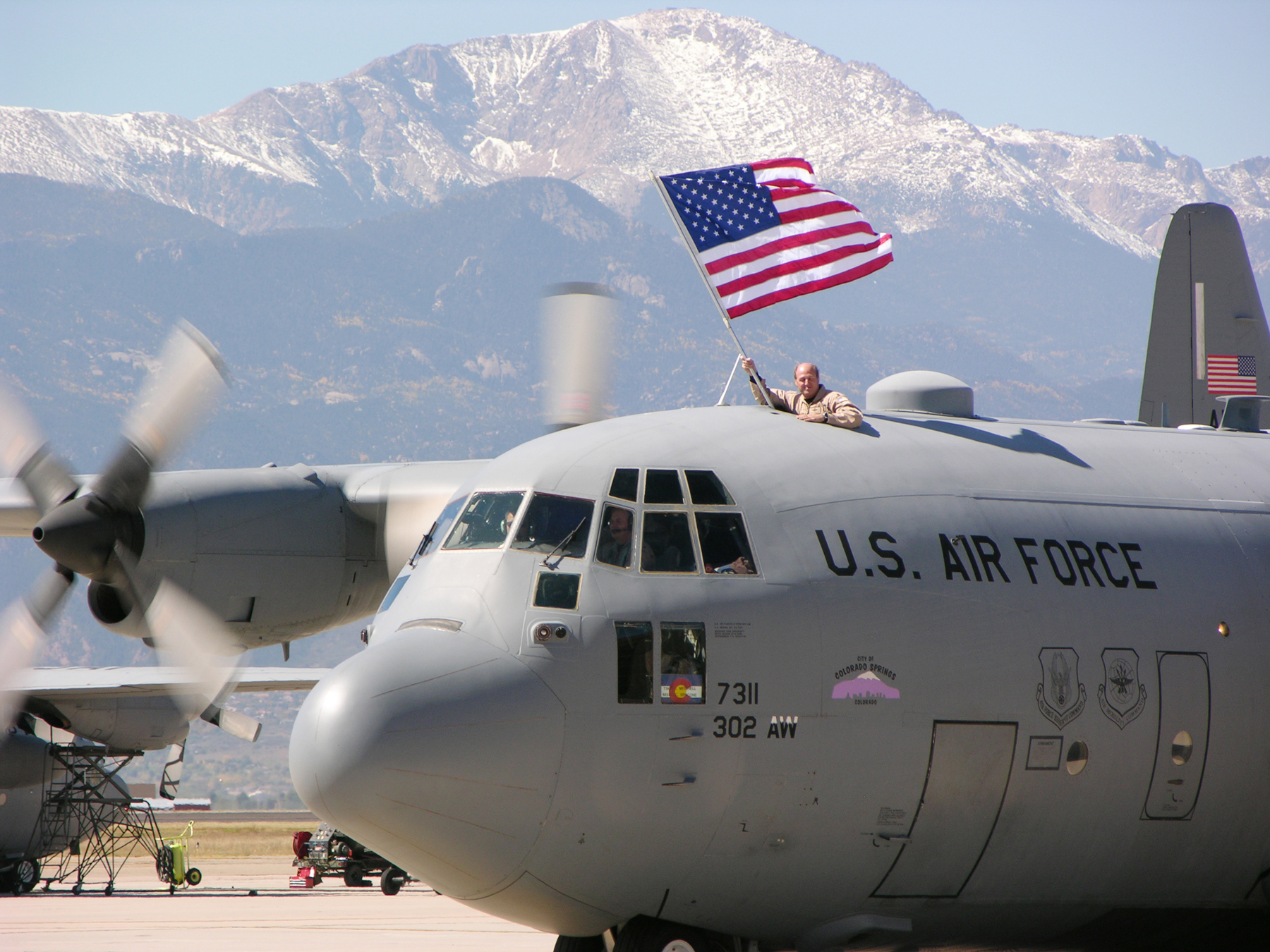
- Lockheed C-130 with Pikes Peak in the background
- Active: 1942–1944; 1949–1951; 1952–1959; 1992–present
- Country: United States
- Branch: United States Air Force
- Role: Airlift
- Decorations: Air Force Outstanding Unit Award

Commanders
- Notable commanders: Joseph J. Nazzaro

Insignia
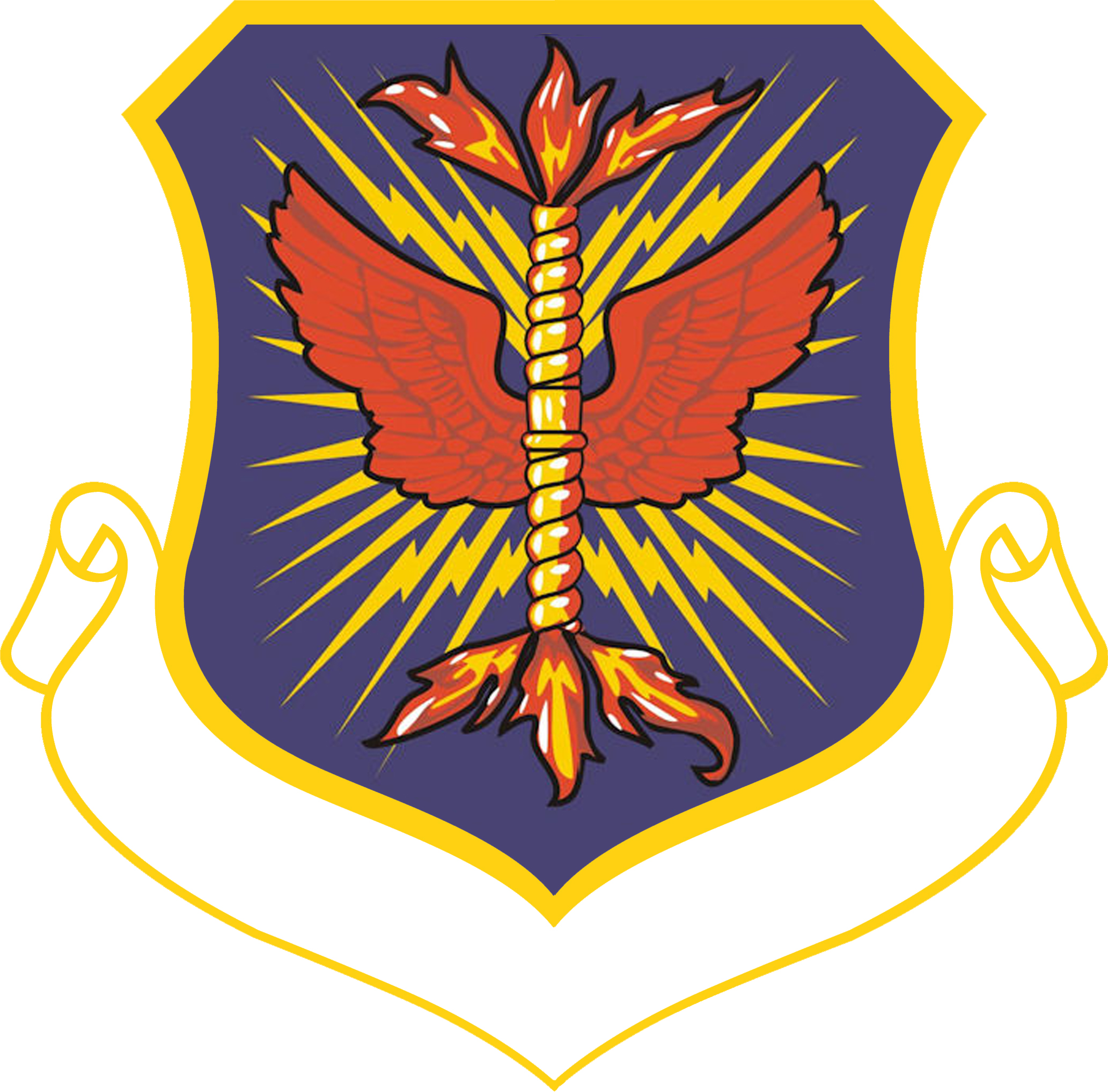
- 302d Operations Group emblem (approved 27 February 1943)

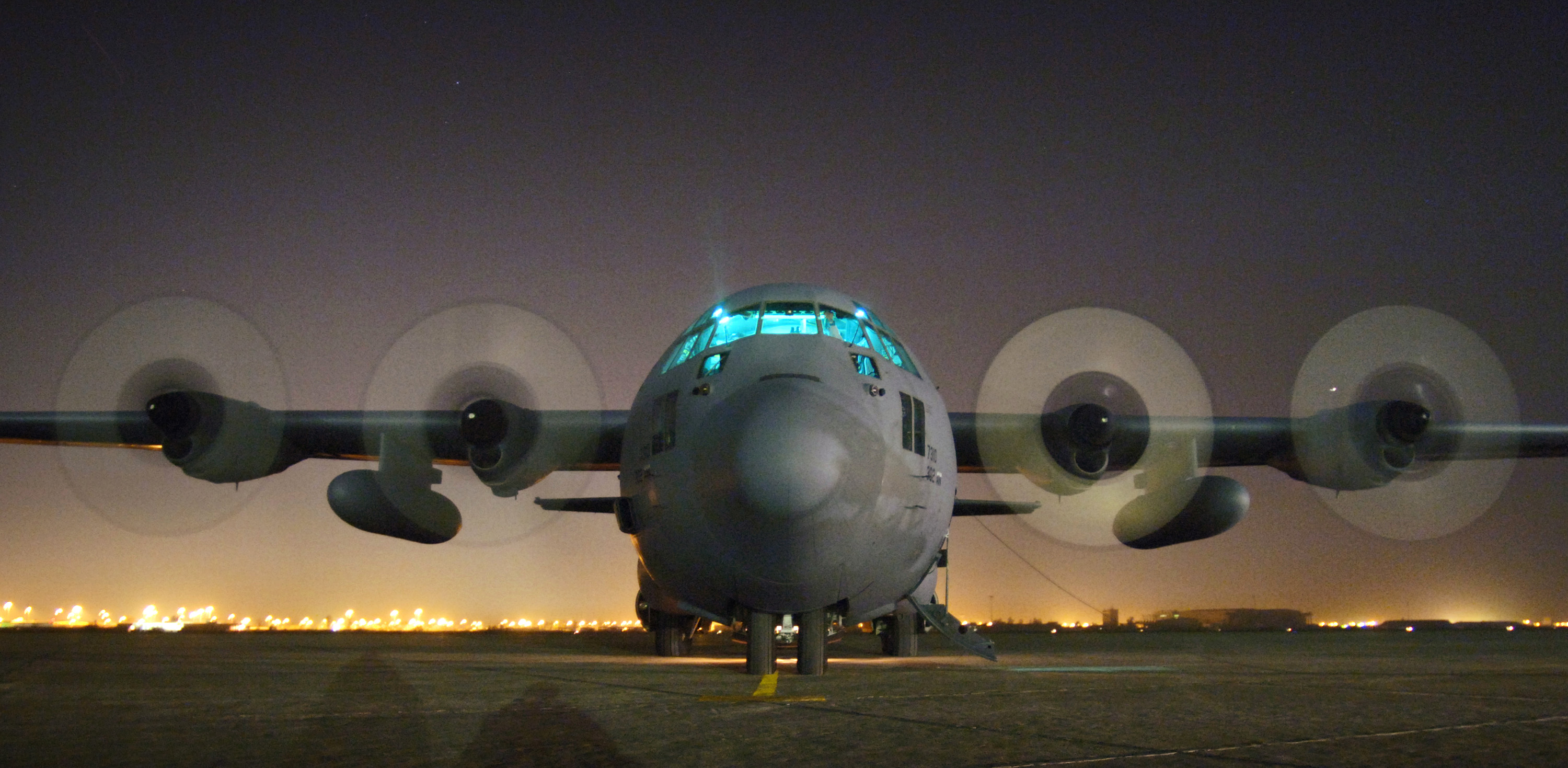
C-130 at Sather Air Base, Iraq

The 302d Operations Group is the operational flying component of the 302d Airlift Wing of the United States Air Force Reserve. It is stationed at Peterson Air Force Base, Colorado.

The group was activated during World War II as the 302d Bombardment Group, a Consolidated B-24 Liberator replacement training unit (RTU). It was originally a Second Air Force unit, it was reassigned to First Air Force in 1943. The group was inactivated in 1944 when the Army Air Forces reorganized its training units to make more efficient use of its manpower.

The group was redesignated the 302d Troop Carrier Group and activated in the Air Force Reserve in 1949. The group was called to active duty in June 1951 and its personnel used as fillers for other units before the 302d was inactivated a week later.

The group was again activated in the reserves in 1952 and trained as an airlift unit until it was inactivated in 1958 when Continental Air Command converted its operational wings to the dual deputy system in which squadrons reported directly to wing headquarters.

The group was activated again when Air Force Reserve Command reorganized under the Combat Wing reorganization.

== Mission ==
The 302 OG consists of one C-130 Hercules squadron, the 731st Airlift Squadron, which has the Modular Airborne Fire Fighting System mission. The group's personnel take part in tactical airlift training exercises and contingency and humanitarian airlift operations, both at home and abroad.

== History ==
The group was activated during World War II as the 302d Bombardment Group, a Consolidated B-24 Liberator replacement training unit (RTU). It was originally a Second Air Force unit, it was reassigned to First Air Force in 1943. The group was inactivated in 1944 when the Army Air Forces reorganized its training units to make more efficient use of its manpower.

The group was redesignated the 302d Troop Carrier Group and activated in the Air Force Reserve in 1949. The group was called to active duty in June 1951 and its personnel used as fillers for other units before the 302d was inactivated a week later.

The group was again activated in the reserves in 1952 and trained as an airlift unit until it was inactivated in 1958 when Continental Air Command converted its operational wings to the dual deputy system in which squadrons reported directly to wing headquarters.

The group was activated again in 1992 when Air Force Reserve Command reorganized under the Combat Wing reorganization.

== Lineage ==
- Constituted as the 302d Bombardment Group (Heavy) on 28 January 1942

Activated on 1 June 1942
Inactivated on 10 April 1944

- Redesignated 302d Troop Carrier Group, Medium on 16 May 1949

Activated in the reserve on 27 June 1949

- Redesignated 302d Troop Carrier Group, Heavy on 28 January 1950

Ordered to active service on 1 June 1951
Inactivated on 8 June 1951

- Redesignated 302d Troop Carrier Group, Medium on 26 May 1952

Activated in the reserve on 14 June 1952
Inactivated on 14 April 1959

- Redesignated 302d Tactical Airlift Group on 31 July 1985 (Remained inactive)
- Redesignated: 302d Operations Group on 1 August 1992 and activated in the reserve

=== Assignments ===
- Second Air Force, 1 June 1942
- 16th Bombardment (later, 16th Bombardment Operational) Training Wing, 1 April 1943
- 46th Bombardment Operational Training Wing, 1 September 1943
- First Air Force, 17 December 1943 – 10 April 1944
- 302d Troop Carrier Wing, 27 June 1949 – 8 June 1951; 14 June 1952 – 14 April 1959
- 302d Airlift Wing, 1 August 1992 – present

=== Components ===
- 7th Space Operations Squadron: 1 May 1993 – 1 September 1997
- 302d Operations Support Squadron (later 302d Operations Support Flight, 302d Operations Support Squadron): 1 August 1992 – present
- 302d Airlift Control Flight, 1 August 1992 - c. 1997
- 355th Bombardment (later Troop Carrier) Squadron: 1 June 1942 – 10 April 1944; 27 June 1949 – 8 June 1951; 14 June 1952 – 14 April 1959
- 356th Bombardment (later Troop Carrier) Squadron: 1 June 1942 – 10 April 1944; 27 June 1949 – 28 January 1950; 14 June 1952 – 14 April 1959
- 357th Bombardment (later Troop Carrier) Squadron: 1 June 1942 – 10 April 1944; 14 June 1952 – 16 November 1957
- 420th Bombardment Squadron: 1 June 1942 – 10 April 1944
- 731st Airlift Squadron: 1 August 1992 – present

=== Stations ===
- Geiger Field, Washington, 1 June 1942
- Davis-Monthan Field, Arizona, 1 June 1942
- Wendover Field, Utah, 30 July 1942
- Pueblo Army Air Base, Colorado, 30 September 1942
- Davis-Monthan Field, Arizona, 1 December 1942
- Clovis Army Air Field, New Mexico, 29 January 1943

- Langley Field, Virginia, 17 December 1943
- Chatham Army Air Field, Georgia, 9 March – 10 April 1944
- McChord Air Force Base, Washington, 27 June 1949 – 8 June 1951
- Clinton County Air Force Base, Ohio, 14 June 1952 – 14 April 1959
- Peterson Air Force Base, Colorado, 1 August 1992–present

=== Aircraft ===
- B-18, 1942
- C-78, 1942
- B-24, 1942–1943, 1943–1944
- C-82, 1949

- C-54, 1949–1950
- C-46, 1952–1957
- C-119, 1956–1959
- C-130, 1992–present
