= SS Cape Newenham =

History
- Name: Cape Newenham
- Owner: United States Maritime Commission
- Operator: American Mail Line
- Port of registry: San Francisco, United States
- Builder: Consolidated Steel Corporation, Wilmington, Los Angeles
- Launched: 21 December 1942
- Completed: April 1943
- Maiden voyage: San Francisco to Australia
- In service: 1943–1946
- Out of service: 1946
- Fate: Scrapped 1965

General characteristics
- Type: Troop transport
- Tonnage: 6,711 GRT
- Length: 417.75 ft (127.33 m)
- Beam: 60 ft (18 m)
- Draft: 27.6 ft (8.4 m)
- Propulsion: turbine
- Speed: 14 knots
- Capacity: 1830 soldiers

Cape Newenham was a type C1-B small cargo ship built for the United States Maritime Commission during World War II. The ship was completed on 24 April 1943, and made a maiden voyage from San Francisco to Brisbane, Port Moresby, and Gladstone, before returning to Oakland, California in August, where Moore Dry Dock Company completed conversion to a troop transport in December.

== Troopship history ==
The first voyage carrying troops was to Gladstone, Townsville, Milne Bay, Buna, Langemak Bay, and Brisbane. The second, leaving San Francisco in March 1944, was to Milne Bay, Oro Bay, and Finschhafen. After returning to San Francisco, the ship moved to Seattle in May and traveled via Honolulu to Saipan and Enewetak Atoll. The ship returned to San Francisco in August and completed another voyage to the Pacific islands including Guam before the end of the year.

The first voyage of 1945 included Honolulu, Saipan, Enewetak Atoll, Roi, Kwajalein Atoll, and Majuro. After returning to San Francisco in March, the ship made a second voyage via Honolulu to Enewetak Atoll and Guam, and a third voyage to those islands plus Ulithi, Leyte, Manila, and Panay. The last voyage of 1945 was a round trip from San Francisco to Manila.

1946 began with the ship undergoing repairs at San Francisco for a round trip to Guam requiring a stop for repairs at Enewetak Atoll. The ship returned to San Francisco in March, and departed in April for a final round trip to Manila before being mothballed in the Suisun Bay Reserve Fleet on 25 June 1946.
