= 355th =

355th may refer to:

== Aviation ==
- 355th Fighter Squadron, an inactive United States Air Force unit
- 355th Fighter Wing, a United States Air Force unit assigned to the Air Combat Command's Twelfth Air Force
- 355th Tactical Airlift Squadron, a U.S. Air Force squadron based at Rickenbacker Air National Guard Base
- 355th Troop Carrier Squadron, an inactive United States Air Force unit
- 355th Operations Group, a United States Air Force unit, assigned to the 355th Wing
- 355th Aviation Company, of the United States Army
- No. 355 Squadron RAF, WWII long range bombing squadron of the British Royal Air Force
- 355th Reconnaissance Aviation Squadron, a Cold War era unit of the Yugoslav Air Force

== Ground forces ==
- 355th Infantry Regiment (United States), an infantry regiment of the United States Army
- 355th Division (Imperial Japanese Army), a WWII home defence infantry division
- 355th Rifle Division, a Soviet WWII infantry division

== See also ==
- 355 (number)
- 355, the year 355 (CCCLV) of the Julian calendar
- 355 BC
- 355 (disambiguation)
