= 355 squadron =

355 squadron or variation, may refer to:

- No. 355 Squadron RAF
- 355th Fighter Squadron, an inactive United States Air Force unit
- 355th Tactical Airlift Squadron, a U.S. Air Force squadron based at Rickenbacker Air National Guard Base
- 355th Troop Carrier Squadron, an inactive United States Air Force unit
- 355th Reconnaissance Aviation Squadron, a Cold War era unit of the Yugoslav Air Force

== See also ==
- 355 (disambiguation)
