= 355 (disambiguation) =

355 AD/CE (CCCLV) is a year in the Gregorian calendar.

355 may also refer to:

- The year 355 BC
- 355 (number), a number in the 300s range

== Places ==
- 355 Gabriella, a main belt asteroid, the 355th asteroid registered
- 355P/LINEAR–NEAT, a periodic comet, the 355th periodic comet registered
- Hill 355, Korea; where the Korean War Battle of Hill 355 took place
- Route 355, see List of highways numbered 355
- +355, the country calling code for telephone numbers in Albania

== People and characters ==
- Agent 355, a secret agent during the American Revolutionary War
- Agent 355 (Y: The Last Man), a character in the comic book series Y: The Last Man

== Other uses ==
- 355th (disambiguation), military units numbered 355
- The 355, a 2022 American spy film
- Cadillac Series 355, a 1930s car
- Ferrari F355, an Italian sportscar
- IBM 355, a computer magnetic disc hard drive

== See also ==
- 335th (disambiguation)
- Battle of Hill 355, in the Korean War
- 35 (disambiguation)
