= 346th Bombardment Group =

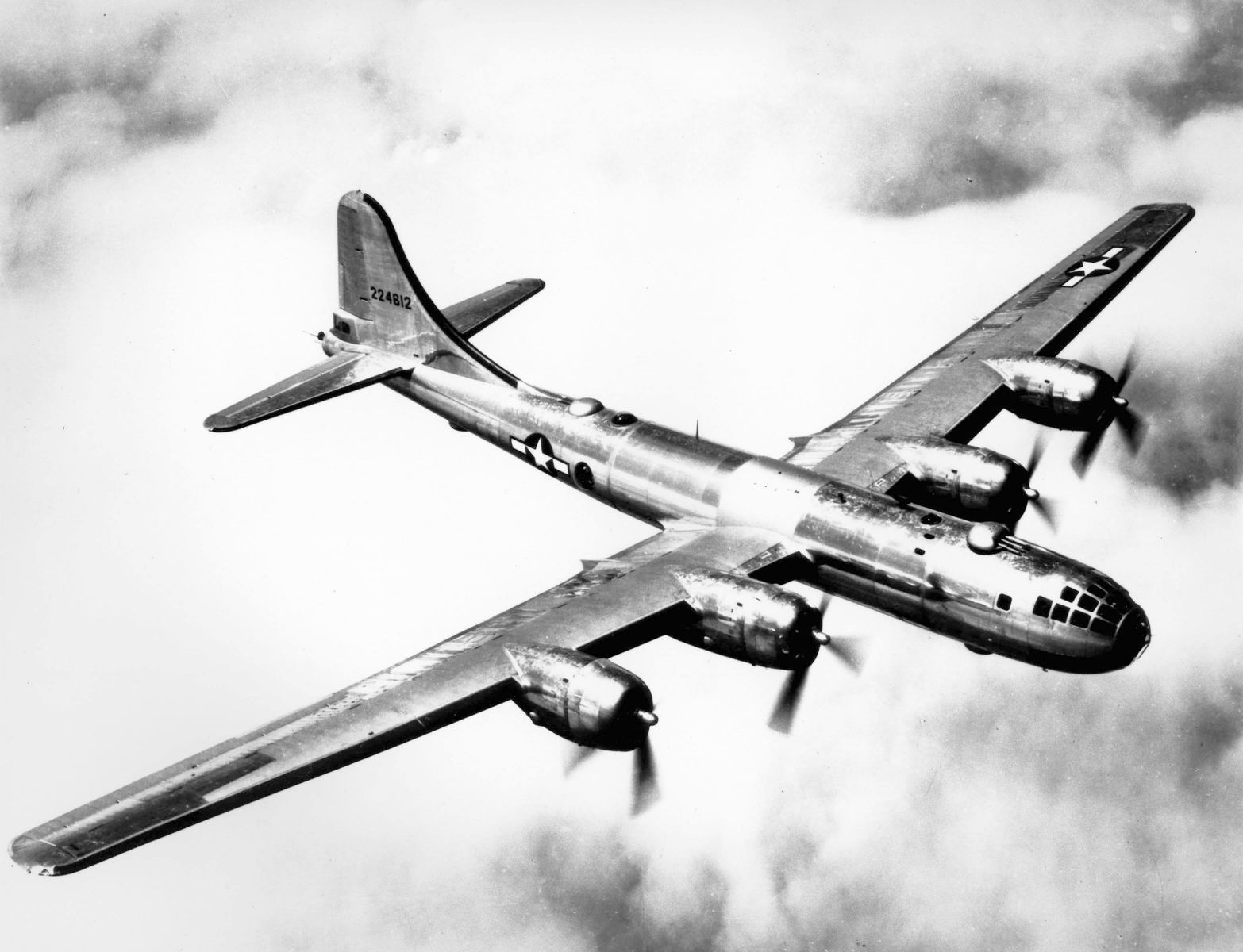
- B-29 Superfortress as flown by the 346th Group
- Active: 1942–1944; 1944–1946
- Country: United States
- Branch: United States Air Force
- Role: Bombardment
- Engagements: Pacific Ocean Theater of World War II

Insignia
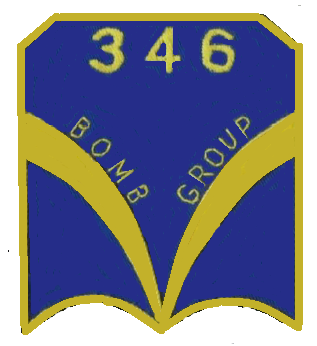
- 346th Bombardment Group emblem

The 346th Bombardment Group is a former United States Army Air Forces unit. It was last assigned to the 316th Bombardment Wing at Kadena Airfield, Okinawa, where it was inactivated on 30 June 1946. The group was originally a heavy bomber training unit, but was inactivated in a general reorganization of Army Air Forces training units in 1944. It was reorganized as a Boeing B-29 Superfortress group later that year. It moved to Okinawa in 1945, but arrived too late to participate in combat.

== History ==
=== Heavy bomber training unit ===
The group was first activated at Salt Lake City Army Air Base, Utah in September 1942, with the 502d, 503d, 504th and 505th Bombardment Squadrons assigned The following month, it moved to Smoky Hill Army Air Field, Kansas, where it began operating as an Operational Training Unit (OTU). The Army Air Forces (AAF) OTU program involved the use of an oversized parent unit to provide cadres to "satellite groups". Initially, the group's 503d and 504th Squadrons were equipped with Boeing B-17 Flying Fortresses, but by the end of the year, the group was entirely equipped with the Consolidated B-24 Liberator.

With the Liberator, the mission changed to acting as a Replacement Training Unit (RTU). Like the OTUs, RTUs were oversized units, but their mission was to train individual aircrews, rather than units. However, the AAF was finding that standard military units, based on relatively inflexible tables of organization were not well adapted to the training mission. In response, the group's squadrons lost their aircraft and the training mission was concentrated in group headquarters in October 1943. Ultimately, The AAF adopted a functional system in which each base was organized into a separate numbered unit, which would be manned and organized specifically for the mission. The 346th Group and its squadrons were inactivated on 1 April 1944, along with support organizations at Dyersburg Army Air Base, Tennessee, and replaced by the 223d AAF Base Unit (Combat Crew Training Station, Bombardment, Heavy)

=== Very heavy bomber operations ===
The group was reactivated at Dalhart Army Air Field, Texas in August 1944 as a very heavy bomber unit. However, the group's component squadrons were not activated with it. Instead, the 461st, 462d and 463d Bombardment Squadrons, which had been components of the 331st Bombardment Group were assigned to the 346th. The group trained with Boeing B-29 Superfortress at Dalhart and at Pratt Army Air Field, Kansas until late June 1945, when it departed the United States for the Pacific Theater.

The group did not arrive at its combat station, Kadena Airfield, on Okinawa until 7 August 1945 and the war ended before it could participate in combat operations, although members of the unit intended to be lead crews flew missions with other units from Saipan, Tinian and Guam. After the war the group participated in several show-of-force missions over Japan and for a time ferried Allied prisoners of war from Okinawa to the Philippine Islands. It served with the occupation forces until it was inactivated in June 1946.

== Lineage ==
- Constituted as the 346th Bombardment Group (Heavy) on 3 September 1942

Activated on 7 September 1942
Inactivated on 1 April 1944

- Redesignated 346th Bombardment Group, Very Heavy on 4 August 1944

Activated on 18 August 1944
Inactivated on 30 June 1946

=== Assignments ===
- II Bomber Command (attached to 46th Bombardment Operational Training Wing after 26 February 1943), 7 September 1942 – 1 April 1944
- II Bomber Command (attached to 17th Bombardment Operational Training Wing), 18 August 1944
- 316th Bombardment Wing, 31 July 1945 – 30 June 1946

=== Components ===
- 461st Bombardment Squadron, 18 August 1944 – 30 June 1946
- 462d Bombardment Squadron, 18 August 1944 – 30 June 1946
- 463d Bombardment Squadron, 18 August 1944 – 30 June 1946
- 502d Bombardment Squadron, 7 September 1942 – 1 April 1944
- 503d Bombardment Squadron, 7 September 1942 – 1 April 1944
- 504th Bombardment Squadron, 7 September 1942 – 1 April 1944
- 505th Bombardment Squadron, 7 September 1942 – 1 April 1944
- 32d Photographic Laboratory (Bombardment Group, Very Heavy), c. 18 August 1944 – c. 30 June 1946

=== Stations ===
- Salt Lake City Army Air Base, Utah, 7 September 1942
- Smoky Hill Army Air Field, Kansas, 3 October 1942
- Dyersburg Army Air Base, Tennessee, 26 February 1943 – 1 April 1944
- Dalhart Army Air Field, Texas, 18 August 1944
- Pratt Army Air Field, Kansas, 18 January – 29 June 1945
- Kadena Airfield, Okinawa 7 August 1945 – 30 June 1946

=== Aircraft flown ===
- Boeing B-17 Flying Fortress, 1942
- Consolidated B-24 Liberator, 1942–1943
- Boeing B-29 Superfortress, 1944-1946

== Campaign and service streamers ==
Campaign Streamer	Campaign	Dates	Notes
	American Theater without inscription	7 September 1942 – 1 April 1944	
	Asia Pacific Theater without inscription	7 August 1945 – 2 March 1946	
