= 461st Bombardment Squadron =

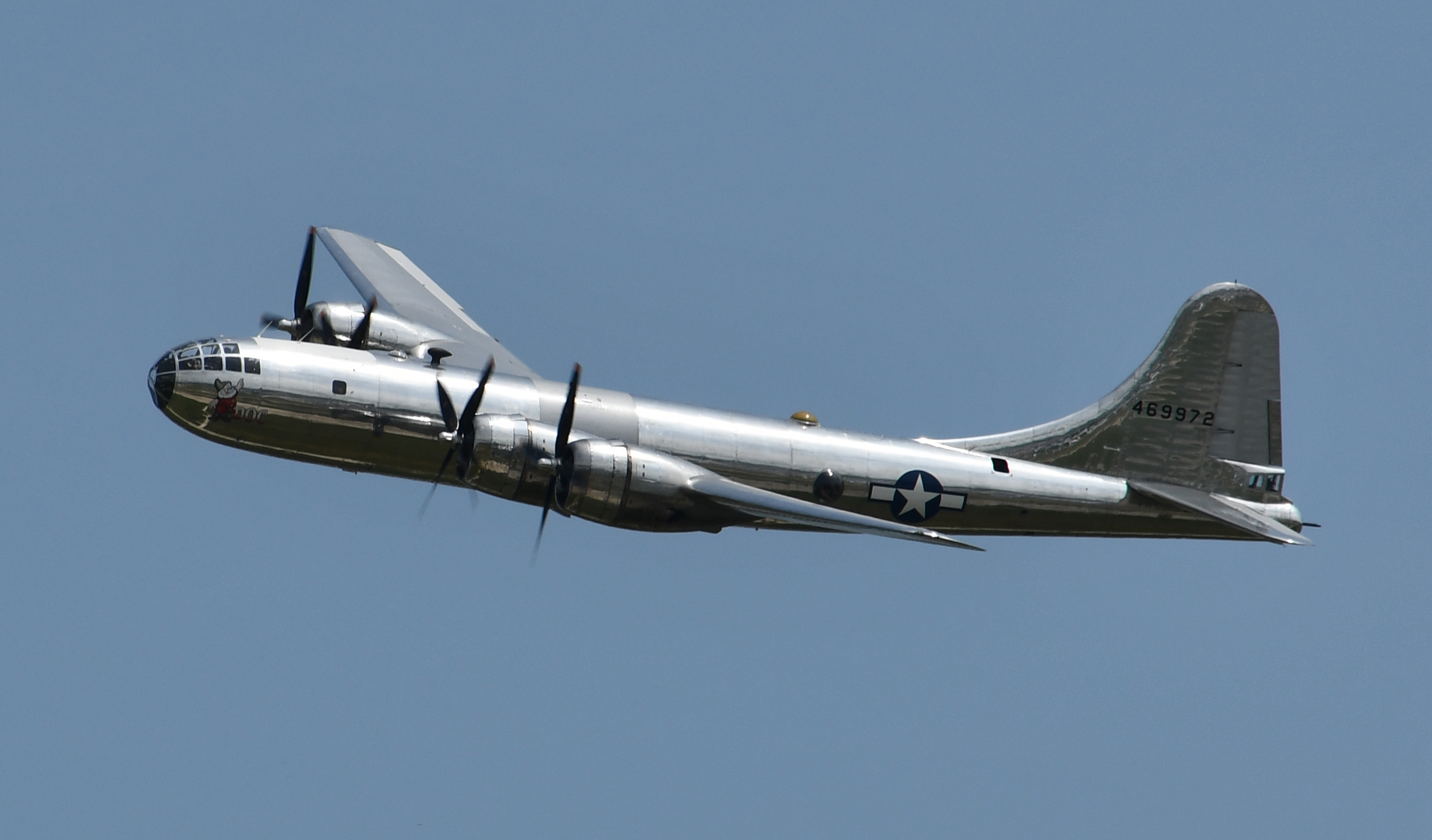
- B-29 Superfortress as flown by the squadron
- Active: 1942–1944; 1944–1946
- Country: United States
- Branch: United States Air Force
- Role: Bombardment
- Engagements: Pacific Ocean Theater

Insignia
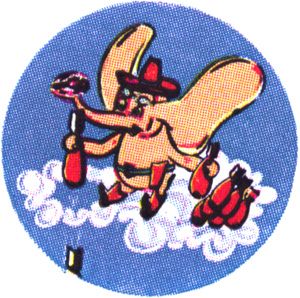
- 461st Bombardment Squadron emblem (Note: Approved 13 January 1943. Description: On a light blue disc, a caricatured tan elephant seated on a white cloud formation, wearing sombrero, boots and pistol case red, goggles white, hurling red aerial bombs through an open ring in the clouds with right forepaw and reaching for reserve supply resting on cloud base with left forepaw, twirling red revolver in trunk.)

The 461st Bombardment Squadron is an inactive United States Air Force unit. Its last assignment was with 346th Bombardment Group at Kadena Airfield, Okinawa, where it was inactivated on 30 June 1946. From 1942 the squadron served as a Replacement Training Unit for heavy bomber aircrews. It was inactivated in the spring of 1944 in a general reorganization of Army Air Forces training units. The squadron was activated again in 1944 as a Boeing B-29 Superfortress unit. Although it deployed to the Pacific, it arrived too late to see combat service.

== History ==
=== Heavy bomber replacement training ===
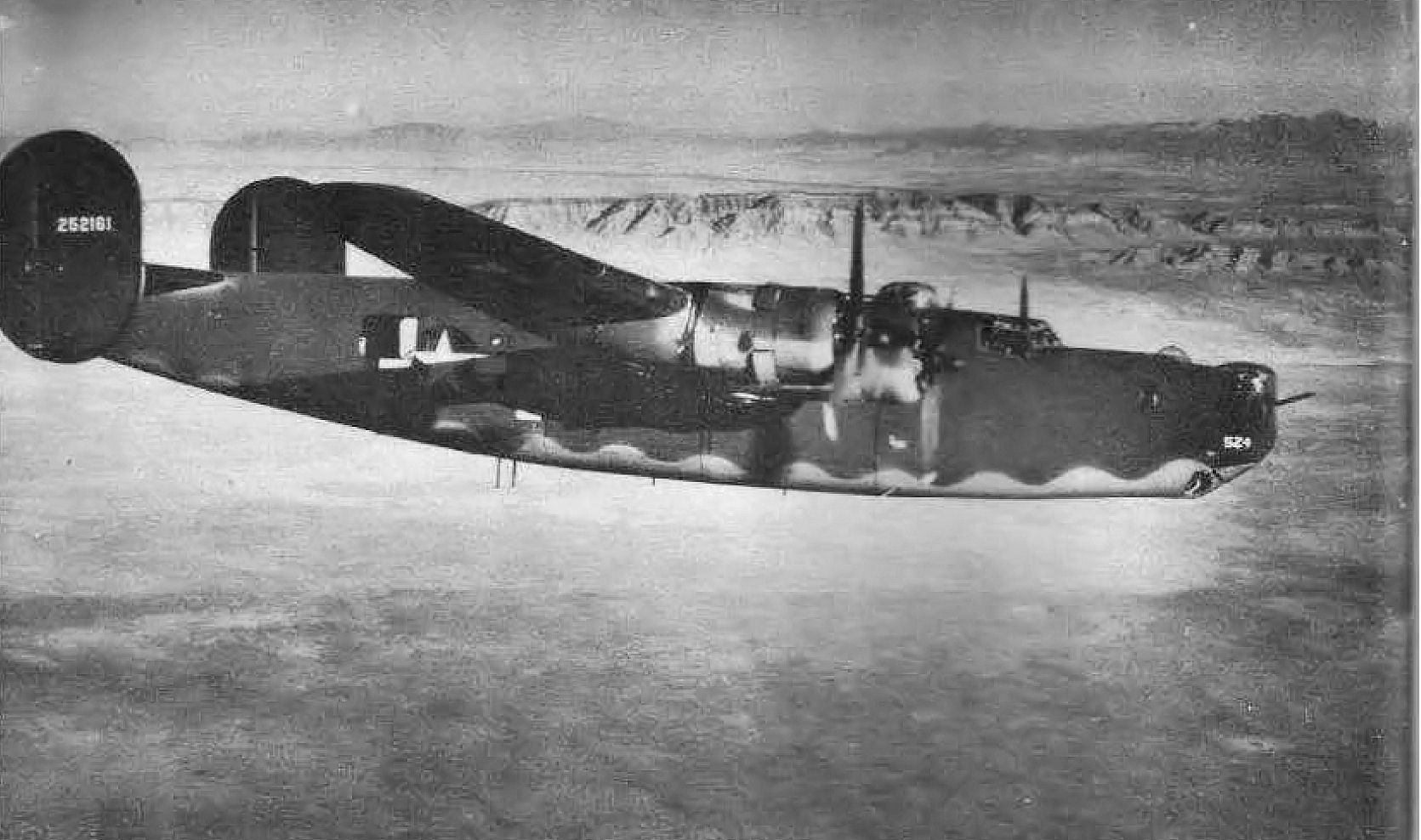
B-24H Liberator from a Second Air Force training unit (Note: Aircraft is Ford Motors built Consolidated B-24H-10-FO Liberator, serial 42-52161. It later deployed to Europe and was shot down on 22 February 1944. Missing Aircrew Report 2832.)

The 461st Bombardment Squadron was first activated in July 1942 at Salt Lake City Army Air Base, Utah as one of the four original squadrons of the 331st Bombardment Group. In September it moved to Casper Army Air Field, where it became a Boeing B-17 Flying Fortress Replacement Training Unit until 1943, when it converted to the Consolidated B-24 Liberator. Replacement training units were oversized units which trained aircrews prior to their deployment to combat theaters.

However, the Army Air Forces found that standard military units, based on relatively inflexible tables of organization, were not proving to be well adapted to the training mission, particularly to replacement training. Accordingly, it adopted a more functional system in which each base was organized into a separate numbered unit, while the groups and squadrons acting as replacement training units were disbanded or inactivated. This resulted in the 462d, along with other units at Casper, being inactivated in the spring of 1944 and being replaced by the 211th AAF Base Unit (Combat Crew Training Station, Heavy), which assumed the 331st Group's mission, personnel, and equipment along with supporting units at Casper, which were disbanded or inactivated.

=== Very heavy bomber operations ===
In August 1944, the squadron was reactivated as a Boeing B-29 Superfortress unit at Dalhart Army Air Field, Texas and assigned to the 346th Bombardment Group. In December it moved to Pratt Army Air Field, Kansas, where it began training with B-29s, along with some B-17s until B-29s became available. in June 1945, it began moving to Okinawa to become part of Eighth Air Force, which was organizing on Okinawa as a second B-29 force for the strategic bombing campaign against Japan. The squadron arrived at its combat station, Kadena Airfield, Okinawa two days before V-J Day. Although the war ended before the squadron could begin operations, a few of its crews formed part of its advanced echelon and flew missions with B-29 units of Twentieth Air Force.

The squadron flew several show of force missions from Okinawa over Japan following VJ Day. It also evacuated prisoners of war from camps in Japan to the Philippines. The squadron was inactivated on Okinawa in June 1946.

== Lineage ==
- Constituted as the 461st Bombardment Squadron (Heavy) on 1 July 1942

Activated on 6 July 1942
Inactivated on 1 April 1944

- Redesignated 461st Bombardment Squadron, Very Heavy on 4 August 1944

Activated on 18 August 1944
Inactivated on 30 June 1946

=== Assignments ===
- 331st Bombardment Group, 6 July 1942 - 1 April 1944
- 346th Bombardment Group, 18 August 1944 - 30 June 1946

=== Stations ===
- Salt Lake City Army Air Base, Utah, 6 July 1942
- Casper Army Air Field, Wyoming, 15 September 1942 - 1 April 1944
- Dalhart Army Air Field, Texas, 18 August 1944
- Pratt Army Air Field, Kansas, 12 December 1944 - 29 June 1945
- Kadena Airfield, Okinawa, 13 August 1945 - 30 June 1946

=== Aircraft ===
- Boeing B-17 Flying Fortress, 1942-1943, 1945
- Consolidated B-24 Liberator, 1943-1944
- Boeing B-29 Superfortress, 1945-1946
- Curtiss C-46 Commando, 1946

=== Campaigns ===
Campaign Streamer	Campaign	Dates	Notes
	American Theater without inscription	6 July 1942–1 April 1944, 1 April 1944-10 May 1944, 7 July 1944-18 June 1945	
	Asiatic Pacific Theater without inscription	5 August 1945–2 September 1945	
