= James Brindley Nicolson =

Recipient of the Victoria Cross

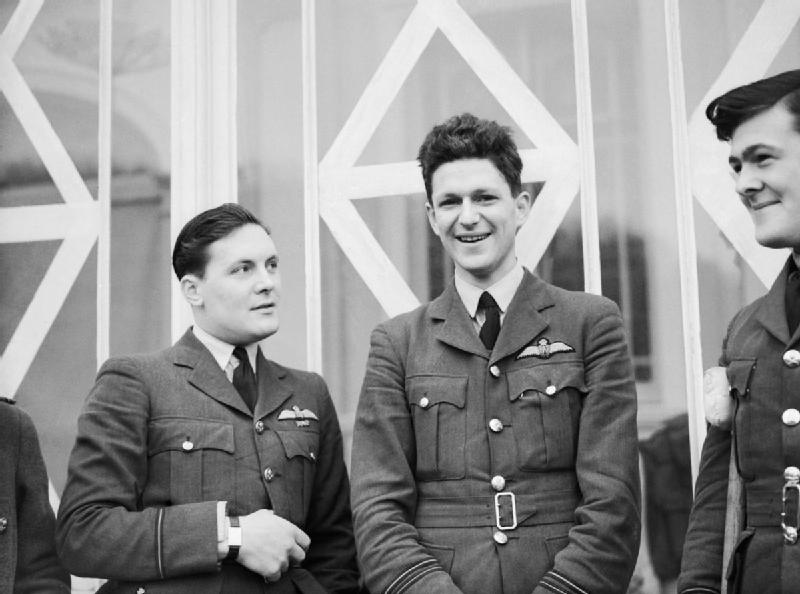
- Flight Lieutenant Nicolson (centre) while recuperating from wounds after his VC action, November 1940
- Born: 29 April 1917; Hampstead, London
- Died: 2 May 1945 (aged 28); Bay of Bengal
- Military career
- Allegiance: United Kingdom
- Branch: Royal Air Force
- Service years: 1936–1945
- Rank: Wing Commander
- Service number: 39329
- Units: No. 72 Squadron; No. 249 Squadron
- Commands: No. 27 Squadron
- Conflicts: Second World War: European air campaign; Battle of Britain; Pacific War †
- Awards: Victoria Cross; Distinguished Flying Cross

James Brindley Eric Nicolson, VC, DFC (29 April 1917 – 2 May 1945) was a fighter pilot and wing commander in the Royal Air Force during the Second World War. He was a recipient of the Victoria Cross, the highest award for gallantry in the face of the enemy that can be awarded to British and Commonwealth forces, for his actions in August 1940 during the Battle of Britain.

== Early life ==
James Brindley Eric Nicolson was born in Hampstead, London, on 29 April 1917. He studied at Yardley Court and Tonbridge School, where he was a day boy from September 1930 to July 1934. In 1935, Nicolson began his career as an engineer at Ricardo Engines. In 1936, he joined the Royal Air Force, with the service number 39329. After his training, he joined No. 72 Squadron in 1937 and later moved to No. 249 Squadron in 1940.

== Second World War ==
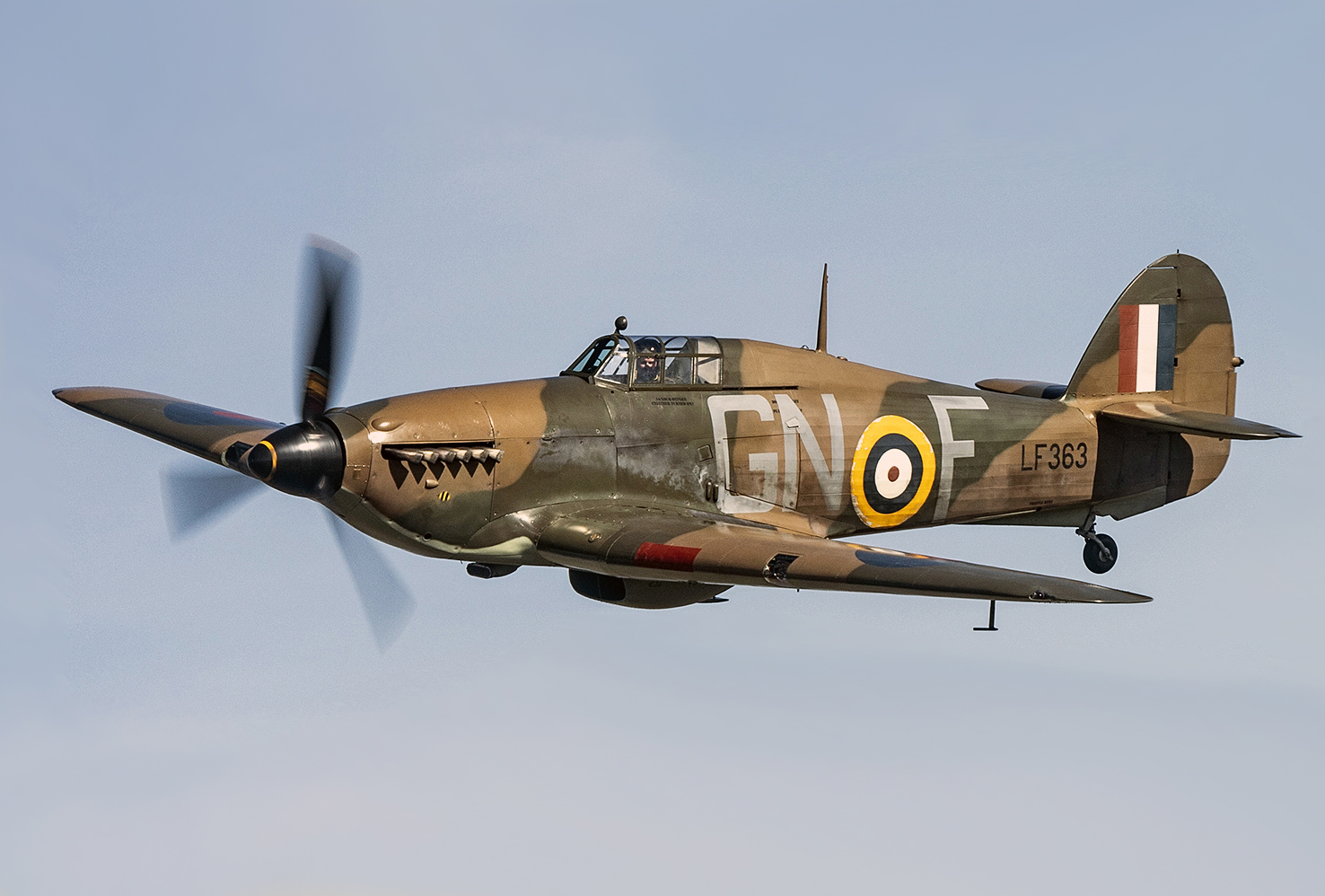
A British Hawker Hurricane, similar to what Nicolson would have flown during the Battle of Britain in 1940.

Nicolson was 23 years old and a flight lieutenant in No. 249 Squadron during the Second World War when he was awarded the Victoria Cross. On 16 August 1940 having taken off from RAF Boscombe Down near Salisbury, Nicolson's Hawker Hurricane was fired on by the Messerschmitt Bf 110's. Nicolson's engine was damaged and the petrol tank set alight. As he struggled to leave the blazing machine, he saw another Messerschmitt, managed to get back into the bucket seat, pressed the firing button, and continued firing until the enemy plane dived away to destruction. He was able to open his parachute in time to land safely in a field. On his descent, he was fired on by members of the Home Guard, who ignored his cry of being a RAF pilot.

=== Victoria Cross citation ===
The announcement and accompanying citation for the decoration was published in supplement to the London Gazette on 15 November 1940, reading

Air Ministry, 15 November 1940.

The KING has been graciously pleased to confer the Victoria Cross on the undermentioned officer in recognition of most conspicuous bravery : –

Flight Lieutenant James Brindley NICOLSON (39329) – No. 249 Squadron.

During an engagement with the enemy near Southampton on 16th August 1940, Flight Lieutenant Nicolson's aircraft was hit by four cannon shells, two of which wounded him whilst another set fire to the gravity tank. When about to abandon his aircraft owing to flames in the cockpit he sighted an enemy fighter. This he attacked and shot down, although as a result of staying in his burning aircraft he sustained serious burns to his hands, face, neck and legs. Flight Lieutenant Nicolson has always displayed great enthusiasm for air fighting and this incident shows that he possesses courage and determination of a high order. By continuing to engage the enemy after he had been wounded and his aircraft set on fire, he displayed exceptional gallantry and disregard for the safety of his own life.

Fully recovered by September 1941, Nicolson was posted to India in 1942. Between August 1943 and August 1944, he was a squadron leader and commanding officer of No. 27 Squadron, flying Bristol Beaufighters over Burma. During this time, he was awarded the Distinguished Flying Cross.

As a wing commander, Nicolson was killed on 2 May 1945 when a RAF B-24 Liberator from No. 355 Squadron, in which he was flying as an observer, caught fire and crashed into the Bay of Bengal. His body was not recovered. He is commemorated on the Singapore Memorial.

Nicolson was the only Battle of Britain pilot and the only pilot of RAF Fighter Command to be awarded the Victoria Cross during the Second World War. His Victoria Cross is displayed at the Royal Air Force Museum, Hendon, England.

== Commemoration ==
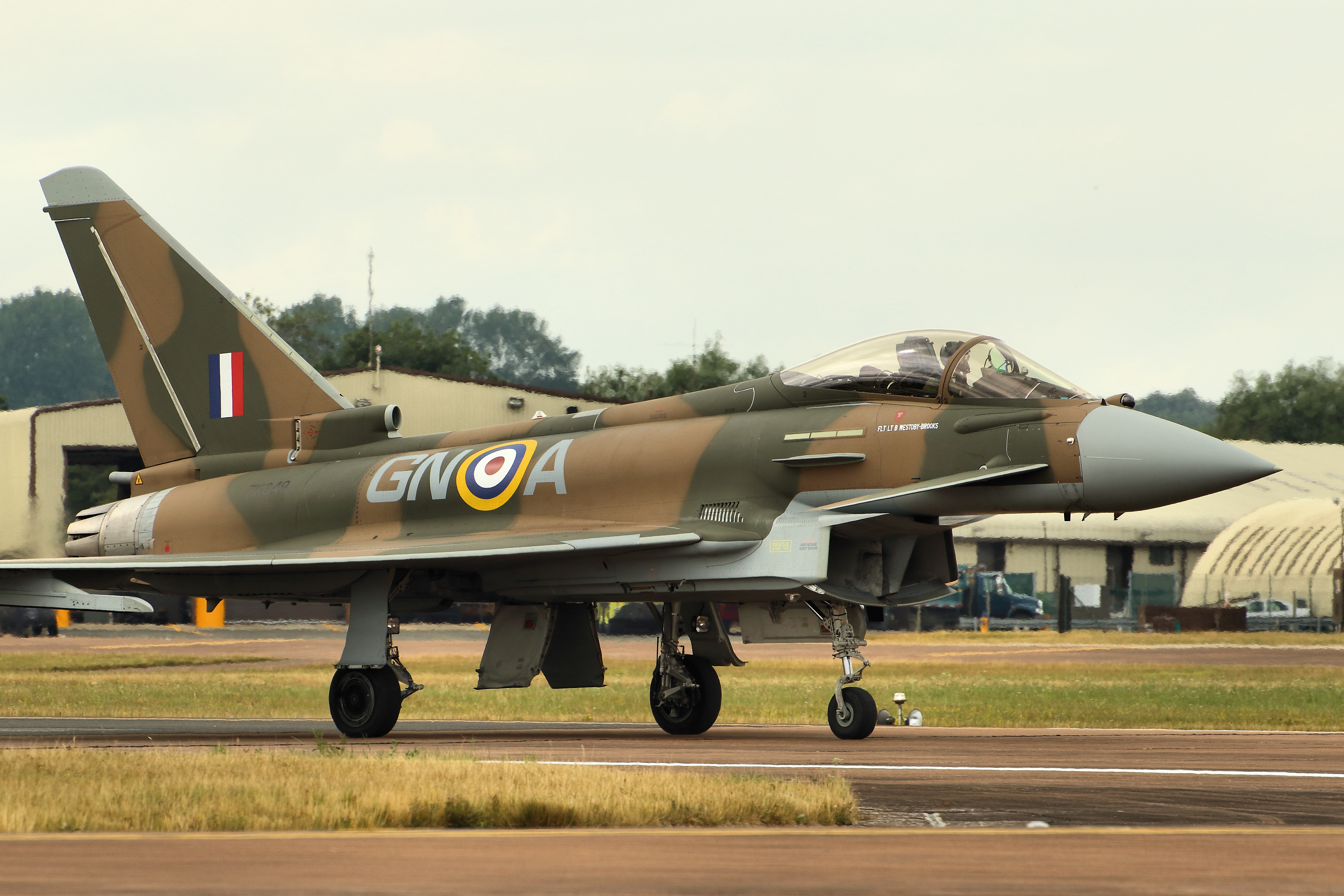
Eurofighter Typhoon ZK349, in World War Two colours, with Nicolson's squad number, at Royal International Air Tattoo 2015

In 2015, the RAF repainted a modern Eurofighter Typhoon jet, ZK349, in Second World War colours, and applied Nicolson's squadron number, GN-A, to commemorate the 75th anniversary of the Battle of Britain.
