= 362d Tactical Electronic Warfare Squadron =

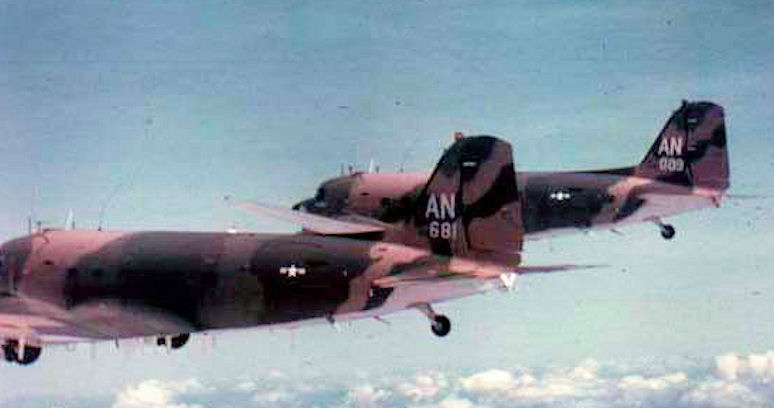
- 362d Tactical Electronic Warfare Squadron EC-47s near Da Nang in 1972
- Active: 1942–1944; 1944–1946; 1967–1973
- Country: United States
- Branch: United States Air Force
- Role: Electronic Warfare
- Part of: Pacific Air Forces
- Mottos: Si Illic Est Invenimus (Latin for 'If It's There, We Found It') (Viet Nam)
- Engagements: Pacific Ocean Theater; Vietnam War
- Decorations: Presidential Unit Citation; Air Force Outstanding Unit Award with Combat "V" Device; Air Force Outstanding Unit Award; Republic of Vietnam Gallantry Cross with Palm

Insignia
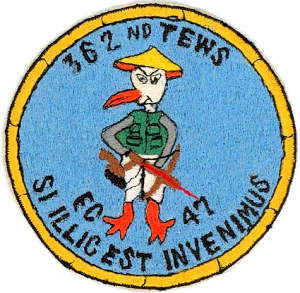
- Patch with unofficial 362d Tactical Electronic Warfare Squadron emblem

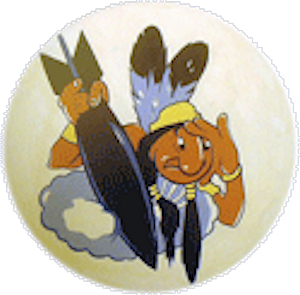
- 462d Bombardment Squadron, Very Heavy emblem (Note: This emblem was not officially approved, but was used while the squadron was assigned to the 346th Bombardment Group.)

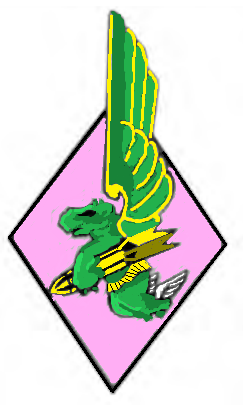
- 462d Bombardment Squadron, Heavy emblem (Note: Approved 16 January 1943. Description: Over and through a diamond light magenta, edged black, a stylized, winged green rhinoceros, grasping a large yellow and black aerial bomb under the left forepaw, wearing a short skirt, having white wings on each hind foot. This emblem was used while the squadron was assigned to the 331st Bombardment Group.)
- Vietnam War Tail Code: AN

The 362d Tactical Electronic Warfare Squadron is an inactive United States Air Force unit. It was last assigned to the 6498th Air Base Wing at Da Nang Air Base, Republic of Vietnam, where it was inactivated on 28 February 1973.

The first predecessor of the squadron is the 462d Bombardment Squadron. It was activated in July 1942 as a Replacement Training Unit for heavy bomber aircrews, but was inactivated in the spring of 1944 in a general reorganization of Army Air Forces training units. The squadron was activated again in 1944 as a Boeing B-29 Superfortress unit. Although it deployed to the Pacific, it arrived too late to see combat service and was inactivated in theater in 1946.

The second predecessor of the squadron was activated in Viet Nam in 1967 as the 362d Reconnaissance Squadron, flying World War II era Douglas C-47 Skytrains equipped with special sensors that did not require high speed aircraft for their operation. It was inactivated in 1973 with the withdrawal of United States forces from Viet Nam. The two squadrons were consolidated into a single unit in September 1985.

== History ==
=== World War II ===
==== Heavy bomber replacement training ====
The 462d Bombardment Squadron was first activated in July 1942 at Salt Lake City Army Air Base, Utah as one of the four original squadrons of the 331st Bombardment Group. In September it moved to Casper Army Air Field, where it became a Boeing B-17 Flying Fortress Replacement Training Unit until 1943, when it converted to the Consolidated B-24 Liberator. Replacement training units were oversized units which trained aircrews prior to their deployment to combat theaters.

However, the Army Air Forces found that standard military units, based on relatively inflexible tables of organization, were not proving to be well adapted to the training mission, particularly to replacement training. Accordingly, it adopted a more functional system in which each base was organized into a separate numbered unit, while the groups and squadrons acting as replacement training units were disbanded or inactivated. This resulted in the 462d, along with other units at Casper, being inactivated in the spring of 1944 and being replaced by the 211th AAF Base Unit (Combat Crew Training Station, Heavy), which assumed the 331st Group's mission, personnel, and equipment along with supporting units at Casper, which were disbanded or inactivated.

==== Very heavy bomber operations ====
In August 1944, the squadron was reactivated as a Boeing B-29 Superfortress unit at Dalhart Army Air Field, Texas and assigned to the 346th Bombardment Group. In December it moved to Pratt Army Air Field, Kansas, where it began training with B-29s, along with some B-17s until B-29s became available. In June 1945, it began moving to Okinawa to become part of Eighth Air Force, which was organizing on Okinawa as a second B-29 force for the strategic bombing campaign against Japan. The squadron arrived at its combat station, Kadena Airfield, Okinawa two days before V-J Day. Although the war ended before the squadron could begin operations, a few of its crews formed part of its advanced echelon and flew missions with B-29 units of Twentieth Air Force.

The squadron flew several show of force missions from Okinawa over Japan following VJ Day. It also evacuated prisoners of war from camps in Japan to the Philippines. The squadron was inactivated on Okinawa in June 1946.

=== Vietnam War ===
In January 1966, Military Assistance Command Vietnam expressed a requirement for airborne radio direction finding (ARDF) to intercept locate enemy radio traffic to locate enemy units. That month, the Air Force began Project Phyllis Ann, which modified 35 Douglas C-47 Skytrains by installing AN/ARD-18 direction finding equipment in them. By August, the first two Phyllis Ann squadrons had been organized.

In July 1966, Detachment 1 of the 361st Reconnaissance Squadron was established at Pleiku Air Base, although its first "Electric Goon" did not arrive until December. Detachment 2 of the 6994th Security Squadron, which would operate the planes' direction finding equipment, was organized in September. On 1 February 1967, Detachment 1 was discontinued and transferred its personnel and equipment to the newly organized 362d Reconnaissance Squadron.

Little over a month after its activation, the squadron was redesignated the 362d Tactical Electronic Warfare Squadron and its RC-47 aircraft became EC-47s. Its mission equipment changed its name from AN/ARD-18 to AN/ALR-34 (Note: Under the Army Navy (AN/) system for naming electronics systems by platform/system/purpose, ARD stood for Aircraft Radio Detection, while ALR stood for Aircraft Countermeasures Receiver. Martin, Year of the Offensive.), and Project Phyllis Ann became Project Compass Dart. The majority of the squadron's EC-47s were EC-47Qs, equipped with more powerful Pratt & Whitney R-2000 engines, rather than the Pratt & Whitney R-1830 engines on the other EC-47 models.

During 1967, the squadron flew the majority of its missions over Laos or near the Vietnamese Demilitarized Zone (DMZ). Missions near the DMZ were flown to support operations of the 3rd Marine Division and detect operations by the North Vietnamese Army (NVA)'s 324B Division and included missions flown off the coast of North Vietnam.. The squadron provided close tactical support for the Marines during Operations Prairie II III and IV.

The squadron also engaged in special operations, dropping leaflets. In addition to the psychological warfare benefits of these missions, they also provided cover for the squadron's actual ARDF mission. It also engaged in visual reconnaissance, not only detecting enemy vehicles, but occasionally locating transmitters on the open seas and providing that information to the Navy for its Operation Market Time blockade.

During the November 1967 Battle of Dak To, squadron ARDF identified NVA units moving toward the Dak To Base Camp. During the battle, squadron identification of the location of enemy units was used to target Boeing B-52 Stratofortress strikes on "known base areas, infiltration routes and strong points." Squadron provided ARDF frequently provided location information for B-52 strikes. In early 1968, operations near the DMZ near Khe Sanh increased, with two of the squadron's planes flying daily missions in the area.

In the spring of 1969, the squadron was moved from Pleiku, which was being turned over to the South Vietnam Air Force to Phan Rang Air Base. The squadron's parent 460th Tactical Reconnaissance Wing was inactivated on 31 August 1971, and the squadron was transferred to the 483d Tactical Airlift Wing. The impending closure of Phan Rang in 1972 required the squadron to move to Da Nang Air Base on 1 February 1972, where it was assigned to the 366th Tactical Fighter Wing When the 366th Wing moved to Thailand, the 362d became part of the 6498th Air Base Wing until it was inactivated on 28 February 1973

== Lineage ==
462d Bombardment Squadron

- Constituted as the 462d Bombardment Squadron (Heavy) on 1 July 1942

Activated on 6 July 1942
Inactivated on 1 April 1944

- Redesignated 462d Bombardment Squadron, Very Heavy on 4 August 1944

Activated on 18 August 1944
Inactivated on 30 June 1946

- Consolidated with the 362d Tactical Electronic Warfare Squadron as the 362d Tactical Electronic Warfare Squadron on 19 September 1985

362d Tactical Electronic Warfare Squadron

- Constituted as the 362d Reconnaissance Squadron and activated

Organized on 1 February 1967
Redesignated 362d Tactical Electronic Warfare Squadron on 15 March 1967
Inactivated on 28 February 1973

- Consolidated with the 462d Bombardment Squadron on 19 September 1985

=== Assignments ===
- 331st Bombardment Group, 6 July 1942 – 1 April 1944
- 346th Bombardment Group, 18 August 1944 – 30 June 1946
- Pacific Air Forces (not organized)
- 460th Tactical Reconnaissance Wing, 1 February 1967
- 483d Tactical Airlift Wing, 31 August 1971
- 366th Tactical Fighter Wing, 1 February 1972
- 6498th Air Base Wing, 27 June 1972 – 28 February 1973

=== Stations ===
- Salt Lake City Army Air Base, Utah, 6 July 1942
- Casper Army Air Field, Wyoming, 15 September 1942 – 1 April 1944
- Dalhart Army Air Field, Texas, 18 August 1944
- Pratt Army Air Field, Kansas, 12 December 1944 – 29 June 1945
- Kadena Airfield, Okinawa, 13 August 1945 – 30 June 1946
- Pleiku Air Base, Republic of Vietnam, 1 February 1967
- Phan Rang Air Base, Republic of Vietnam, June 1969
- Da Nang Air Base, Republic of Vietnam, 1 February 1972 – 28 February 1973

=== Aircraft ===
- Boeing B-17 Flying Fortress, 1942–1943, 1945
- Consolidated B-24 Liberator, 1943–1944
- Boeing B-29 Superfortress, 1945–1946
- Curtiss C-46 Commando, 1946
- Douglas RC-47 (later EC-47) Skytrain

=== Awards and campaigns ===
Award streamer	Award	Dates	Notes
	Presidential Unit Citation	[1 February 1967]-13 June 1967	362d Reconnaissance Squadron (later 362d Tactical Electronic Warfare Squadron)
	Presidential Unit Citation	1 September 1967-10 July 1968	362d Tactical Electronic Warfare Squadron
	Presidential Unit Citation	11 July 1968-31 August 1969	362d Tactical Electronic Warfare Squadron
	Presidential Unit Citation	1 February 1971-31 March 1971	362d Tactical Electronic Warfare Squadron
	Presidential Unit Citation	1 April 1972-26 June 1972	362d Tactical Electronic Warfare Squadron
	Air Force Outstanding Unit Award with Combat "V" Device	[1 February 1967]-31 May 1967	362d Reconnaissance Squadron (later 362d Tactical Electronic Warfare Squadron)
	Air Force Outstanding Unit Award with Combat "V" Device	1 July 1969-30 June 1970	362d Tactical Electronic Warfare Squadron
	Air Force Outstanding Unit Award with Combat "V" Device	1 July 1970-30 June 1971	362d Tactical Electronic Warfare Squadron
	Air Force Outstanding Unit Award with Combat "V" Device	1 September 1971-31 December 1971	362d Tactical Electronic Warfare Squadron
	Air Force Outstanding Unit Award with Combat "V" Device	1 February 1972-31 March 1972	362d Tactical Electronic Warfare Squadron
	Vietnamese Gallantry Cross with Palm	[1 February 1967]-31 May 1967	362d Reconnaissance Squadron (later 362d Tactical Electronic Warfare Squadron)
	Vietnamese Gallantry Cross with Palm	1 September 1967-28 January 1973	362d Tactical Electronic Warfare Squadron

Campaign Streamer	Campaign	Dates	Notes
	American Theater without inscription	6 July 1942–1 April 1944, 1 April 1944-10 May 1944, 7 July 1944-18 June 1945	462d Bombardment Squadron
	Asiatic Pacific Theater without inscription	13 August 1945–2 September 1945	462d Bombardment Squadron
	Vietnam Air Offensive	1 February 1967 – 8 March 1967	361st Reconnaissance Squadron
	Vietnam Air Offensive, Phase II	9 March 1967 – 31 March 1968	362d Reconnaissance Squadron (later 361st Tactical Electronic Warfare Squadron)
	Vietnam Air/Ground	22 January 1968 – 7 July 1968	362d Tactical Electronic Warfare Squadron
	Vietnam Air Offensive, Phase III	1 April 1968 – 31 October 1968	362d Tactical Electronic Warfare Squadron
	Vietnam Air Offensive, Phase IV	1 November 1968 – 22 February 1969	362d Tactical Electronic Warfare Squadron
	Tet 1969/Counteroffensive	23 February 1969 – 8 June 1969	362d Tactical Electronic Warfare Squadron
	Vietnam Summer-Fall 1969	9 June 1969 – 31 October 1969	362d Tactical Electronic Warfare Squadron
	Vietnam Winter-Spring 1970	3 November 1969 – 30 April 1970	362d Tactical Electronic Warfare Squadron
	Sanctuary Counteroffensive	1 May 1970 – 30 June 1970	362d Tactical Electronic Warfare Squadron
	Southwest Monsoon	1 July 1970 – 30 November 1970	362d Tactical Electronic Warfare Squadron
	Commando Hunt V	1 December 1970 – 14 May 1971	362d Tactical Electronic Warfare Squadron
	Commando Hunt VI	15 May 1971 – 31 July 1971	362d Tactical Electronic Warfare Squadron
	Commando Hunt VII	1 November 1971 – 29 March 1972	362d Tactical Electronic Warfare Squadron
