= Lionel Hedges =

English cricketer

Personal information
- Full name: Lionel Paget Hedges
- Born: 13 July 1900; Streatham, London
- Died: 12 January 1933 (aged 32); Cheltenham, Gloucestershire
- Batting: Right-handed
- Role: Batsman

Domestic team information
- Years: Team
- 1919–1924: Kent
- 1920–1923: Oxford University
- 1926–1929: Gloucestershire
- FC debut: 30 July 1919 Kent v Middlesex
- Last FC: 28 August 1929 Gloucestershire v Hampshire

Career statistics
Competition	First-class
Matches	120
Runs scored	4,219
Batting average	22.20
100s/50s	4/20
Top score	130
Balls bowled	47
Wickets	1
Bowling average	60.00
5 wickets in innings	0
10 wickets in match	0
Best bowling	1/23
Catches/stumpings	69/–
- Source: CricInfo, 29 September 2014

Lionel Paget Hedges (13 July 1900 – 12 January 1933) was an English amateur cricketer whose feats as a schoolboy at Tonbridge School led him to be named, in 1919, as one of the Wisden Cricketers of the Year.

== Early life and education ==
Hedges was born at Streatham in London in 1900. He attended Yardley Court and Tonbridge School in Kent where he was in the school cricket team from 1916 to 1919. He was described as a "brilliant schoolboy batsman", captaining the team during his final year. Hedges was one of five public schoolboys selected as Wisden Cricketers of the Year in the 1919 edition in the absence of first-class cricket during the First World War after scoring 632 runs for Tonbridge in 1918. He went on to an even better season in 1919, scoring a school record 1,038 runs, including scores of 193, 176 and 163.

== Cricket career ==
Hedges made his first-class cricket debut for Kent County Cricket Club in July 1919 against Middlesex at Maidstone in the 1919 County Championship. He went up to Trinity College, Oxford, later in the year and won a cricket Blue as a freshman in 1920, going on to play in three University matches and appear in 35 first-class matches for the University cricket team.

He continued to play for Kent whilst at Oxford. His best season was in 1921 when he scored 1,138 runs, whilst his highest score, 130 against Yorkshire, came in 1920 at Maidstone. He played 52 times for Kent between 1919 and 1924, making two centuries, before leaving the county to take up a post as a school teacher at Cheltenham College in Gloucestershire. He was considered to be an exceptional fielder, generally at cover point, throughout his cricketing career, although his batting, at first-class level at least, declined.

Hedges played only one first-class match in 1925 whilst qualifying to play for Gloucestershire. He made his debut for his new county in 1926 and went on to play 30 times for them, most frequently at grounds in Cheltenham. He played for Cheltenham Cricket Club whilst a master at the college, scoring over 1,000 runs in 1925, his first with the club, and being elected captain ahead of the 1926 season.

His final first-class match came in August 1929 and he gave up the Cheltenham captaincy at the end of the same season, playing less club cricket in 1930 and 1931 before appearing regularly again for Cheltenham in 1932. He was expected to be awarded the captaincy again in 1933 but died before the start of the new season.

== Professional and private life ==
Hedges worked as a school master at Cheltenham College from the autumn of 1924 until his death. He was an "accomplished amateur stage actor" and well known for his "exceptional personality". In 1931 he acted in the film Tell England.

Hedges died in 1933 at Cheltenham at the age of 32 after contracting influenza.
