= Eric Bickmore =

English cricketer and school teacher

Personal information
- Full name: Arthur Frederic Bickmore
- Born: 19 May 1899; Tonbridge, Kent
- Died: 18 March 1979 (aged 79); Tonbridge, Kent
- Batting: Right-handed

Domestic team information
- Years: Team
- 1919–1929: Kent
- 1920–1921: Oxford University

Career statistics
| Competition | First-class |
|---|---|
| Matches | 64 |
| Runs scored | 2,254 |
| Batting average | 23.23 |
| 100s/50s | 2/12 |
| Top score | 120 |
| Catches/stumpings | 41/– |
- Source: CricInfo, 19 March 2017

Arthur Frederic Bickmore (19 May 1899 – 18 March 1979), known as Eric Bickmore, was an English school teacher and cricketer who played for Kent County Cricket Club and Oxford University between 1919 and 1929.

== Early life ==
Bickmore was born in Tonbridge in Kent, the son of Arthur and Lilian Bickmore. His father, an Oxford graduate, had founded Yardley Court, the prep school for Tonbridge School, in 1898 and was Headmaster, running the school alongside his wife. Bickmore attended the school but won a scholarship to Clifton College where he was in the Cricket XI for four years and captain in his final year at school; he was highly rated both as a batsman, leading the school's averages in 1916 and 1917, and as an out-fielder. He served in the school Officer Training Corps during the early years of World War I.

== Military career ==
Bickmore enlisted in January 1917 in the Royal Field Artillery (RFA) as a Private. He was allocated to the Army Reserve and applied for the Officer Cadet School. He was mobilised in December 1917 and commissioned as a temporary 2nd Lieutenant in the RFA in June 1918 after suffering from influenza during the Spanish flu pandemic.

He was posted to the 52nd Division in France in August 1918, joining the Divisional Ammunition Column, taking loads of ammunition towards the front line. He served during the Hundred Days Offensive and the Advance to the Hindenburg Line until the Armistice in November 1918. He left the army at the end of January 1919 with the rank of 2nd Lieutenant.

== Cricketing career and later life ==
Bickmore played in 64 first-class cricket matches, making his debut for Kent against Essex at Leyton in June 1919. He was a right handed opening batsman who scored 2,254 runs, including two centuries, and appeared in two University matches for Oxford. He played 48 matches for Kent.

Bickmore was awarded his Kent county cap in 1920 after scoring over 600 runs, including his maiden first-class century, and went up to Magdalen College, Oxford the same year, winning the first of his two cricket Blues. He graduated after two years, completing a special, shortened war degree and became a school teacher, becoming joint Headteacher of Yardley Court with his brother Maurice. This restricted his cricketing appearances and he played only a few matches after the 1923 season, although he remained prolific in club cricket for teams such as Yellowhammers, Free Foresters and Band of Brothers. His last first-class appearance was for Kent in 1929 against Warwickshire at Tunbridge Wells.

As well as teaching English at Tunbridge School, he remained Head of Yardley Court until his retirement in the 1970s, for a time alongside his son John. Amongst his pupils was Bob Woolmer who went on to play for Kent and England. Woolmer recalled that Bickmore "drummed into his charges that the umpire's decision was final."

Wisden's obituary of Bickmore said that "he was one of the great outfields of his day and was equally good at short-leg." He married Lillias Lawson in 1924, and when he died in Tonbridge in 1979 aged 79, he was the last survivor of the 1920 Oxford team.

== Bibliography ==
- Carlaw, Derek (2020). Kent County Cricketers, A to Z: Part Two (1919–1939) (PDF). Cardiff: ACS.
