= Ruaridh McConnochie =

England international rugby union player

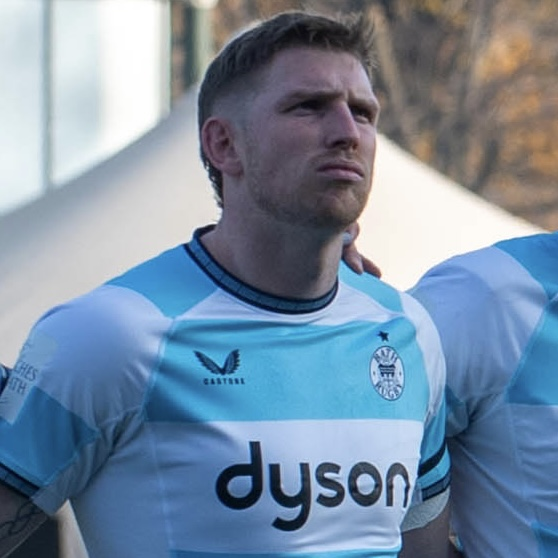
- McConnochie ahead of Bath Rugby's match against Benetton Treviso, December 2024
- Born: 23 October 1991 (age 35) Lambeth, London
- Height: 1.89 m (6 ft 2 in)
- Weight: 93 kg (14 st 9 lb; 205 lb)
- School: Yardley Court; Cranbrook School; University of Gloucestershire

Rugby union career
- Position: Wing
Youth career
- -: Cranbrook RFC
2012-2014	Nuneaton RFC		
2014-2015	Hartpury College		
Senior career
Years	Team	Apps	(Points)
2018–	Bath	96	(150)
International career
Years	Team	Apps	(Points)
2019	England	2	(5)
2023	Scotland	0	(0)
National sevens teams
Years	Team		Comps
2015-18	England		
2016	Great Britain		Rio 2016
Medal record
Men's rugby sevens
Representing Great Britain
Olympic Games
Silver medal – second place	2016 Rio de Janeiro	Team competition
Representing England
Commonwealth Games
Bronze medal – third place	2018 Gold Coast	Team competition

Ruaridh McConnochie (born 23 October 1991) is a British rugby union player. He was a member of the Great Britain silver medal-winning team in Rugby sevens at the 2016 Summer Olympics, and a full England International, making his debut against Italy at St James's Park in September 2019, with a second cap, against USA at the 2019 Rugby World Cup. He wasn't selected to play again for England since, and as a result has become eligible to play for Scotland through his Scottish parents. His great-grandfather James Macdonald represented Scotland in football and his grandfather Hamish Macdonald was a scratch golfer and a member of the R&A in St Andrews.

== Early life ==
McConnochie attended Yardley Court and Cranbrook School, Kent, where he played for the school's 1st XV rugby union team. McConnochie played rugby at the University of Gloucestershire, as well as playing for Nuneaton RFC between 2012 and 2014 before joining Hartpury College.

== England sevens ==
During his days at Hartpury, McConnochie made his England Sevens debut at the 2015 Dubai Sevens, adding to his GB Student Sevens appearance where he won the World University Sevens Championship. He was a silver Olympic medallist with Great Britain at the Rio 2016 Summer Olympics and World Cup finalist with England. A regular try-scorer in the World Rugby Sevens Series, a year later, Ruaridh played an integral role in England's gold medal triumph in Cape Town in December 2016. He also touched down in the 14-12 quarter-final win over New Zealand in Vancouver in March 2017 on the way to England's gold medal success.

== England national team ==
On 31 January 2018, McConnochie signed a professional contract with top English club Bath in the Aviva Premiership from the 2018–19 season.

In June 2019 he was one of four uncapped players named in England's preliminary World Cup training squad. Eddie Jones named McConnochie in the starting line-up to play Wales in England's first warm-up game but had to withdraw from the line-up with a hip injury, however, he was still named in Jones' 31-man squad. McConnochie was also named in the second warm-up against Wales before again pulling out through injury.

McConnochie was eligible to play for Scotland through his Scottish father, but elected instead to play for his country of birth, England. He finally earned his full England cap on 6 September 2019 against Italy. McConnochie started on the wing, playing 51 minutes before being replaced by Bath teammate Joe Cokanasiga. The winger recorded his first International points, a try, during the first half of England's comfortable Rugby World Cup 2019 group stage win over the USA.

== Scotland national team ==
In January 2023, McConnochie was included on the Scotland squad for the 2023 Six Nations Championship. He became eligible for Scotland under World Rugby rule allowing a change to another country for which he qualifies once more than three years have elapsed since his last match for England.

== Honours ==
England

- Rugby World Cup / Webb Ellis Cup
  - Runner up: 2019
