= Yardley Court =

Location
- Somerhill House; Tudeley Road; Tonbridge, Kent, TN11 0NJ; England; 51.18468°N 0.29905°E

Information
- Type: Preparatory school
- Motto: Latin: Comites in comitate (Friends in friendship)
- Established: 1898
- Founders: Arthur and Lilian Bickmore
- Gender: Boys
- Age: 7 to 13
- Colours: Cerise and black
- Former pupils: Old Yardley Courtiers
- Sites: Yardley Park Road, Tonbridge (1898–1990); Somerhill House (1990–present)
- Status: Since 2018, the boys' section of Somerhill
- Website: http://www.somerhill.org

Yardley Court was a preparatory school for boys in Tonbridge, Kent, England. It was founded in 1898 by Arthur Bickmore and his wife, Lilian, and was run by members of the Bickmore family until 1990, when it moved from Yardley Park Road to Somerhill House on the edge of the town. There it formed part of The Schools at Somerhill until 2018, when the schools on the site were unified as a single school, Somerhill, within which the boys' section continues to use the Yardley Court name.

== History ==
=== The Bickmore family, 1898–1990 ===
Arthur Bickmore, a schoolmaster, and his wife Lilian opened the school in 1898 with 12 pupils at Yardley Court in Yardley Park Road, close to Tonbridge School. In 1923 he retired and his sons Maurice and Eric Bickmore succeeded him as joint headmasters. Eric Bickmore also played cricket for Oxford University (1920–21) and Kent County Cricket Club (1919–29). Between 1923 and 1928 the school added a wing with a dining hall and dormitories, and bought four acres for playing fields.

The school had close links with Tonbridge School, and in 1934 a record 134 former pupils were there at the same time. In 1956 it bought Yardley Crest to provide more boarding places.

Eric Bickmore's son John became joint headmaster with his father in 1958, and John's brother Michael joined them in 1963. The first science laboratory opened in 1969. For the school's 75th anniversary in 1973, Norman Crompton, a teacher, wrote its first history. By 1977 there were 175 pupils, 60 of them boarders, and John Bickmore's wife, Mary, had become matron.

John Bickmore died in 1982. In 1983 John Barber, who had taught at the school for some years, became the first headmaster from outside the family, serving jointly with Michael Bickmore.

=== Move to Somerhill, 1987–1998 ===
In 1987 a pre-preparatory department for boys aged four to seven opened at Yardley Crest. It was called Bickies, after the school's local nickname, "Bickie's place". The following year Michael Bickmore announced plans to sell the Yardley Park Road site and move the school to Somerhill.

The school moved in 1990, and Michael Bickmore retired the same year. The old site was redeveloped for housing. The school's war memorial, a lychgate inscribed "To Garden of Memory", was moved to Somerhill shortly afterwards and the memorial garden was reinstated there. A charitable trust was set up in 1991 to run the school. In 1992 Tony Brook, the acting head, was appointed headmaster.

Derwent Lodge, a girls' school from Tunbridge Wells, joined Yardley Court at Somerhill in 1993.

=== The Schools at Somerhill, 1998–2018 ===
In 1998, the school's centenary year, John Coakley was appointed principal of The Schools at Somerhill. Bickmore Hall opened in 2002. In 2018 the schools were unified as Somerhill.

== Motto and crest ==
The school's motto was Comites in comitate, which it translated as "friends in friendship". Its crest was a quartered shield in cerise and black, which appeared on both of the school's war memorial boards.

== Roll of Honour ==
The school lost 44 old boys and masters in the First World War and 63 in the Second World War. Their names are recorded on two oak boards inside the lychgate at the entrance to the Garden of Memory at Somerhill, where a wreath is laid each year on Remembrance Day. Among them is Wing Commander James Brindley Nicolson, VC, DFC.

Yardley Courtiers who died in the First World War
Name	Where buried or commemorated
Alfric Euan Allies	Helles Memorial
Edward John Austin	Manor Park Cemetery
Francis Cedric Balcombe	Tyne Cot Cemetery
Hugh Reginald Bell	Cabaret-Rouge British Cemetery, Souchez
Gordon Alick Birdwood	Vailly British Cemetery
John Gordon Brown	Ration Farm Military Cemetery, La Chapelle-d'Armentières
Eric James Kershaw Buckley	Flushing (Vlissingen) Northern Cemetery
Sidney Leslie Cannon	Alexandria (Hadra) War Memorial Cemetery
John de Carrick Cheape	Hamel Military Cemetery, Beaumont-Hamel
John Waterhouse Children	Vimy Memorial
George Ernest Lister Cressey	Loos Memorial
Cecil Croucher	Warlincourt Halte British Cemetery, Saulty
Hugo Warncliffe Freeland	Birr Cross Roads Cemetery
Charles Clement Ford	Sucrerie Military Cemetery, Colincamps
Clive Griffin	Salonika (Lembet Road) Military Cemetery
Eustace Hammick	Cairo War Memorial Cemetery
Ernest Lumley Hammick	Madras 1914–1918 War Memorial, Chennai
John Hanmer	Niederzwehren Cemetery
William Baker Hervey	East Sheen Cemetery
John Sheffield Holroyde	Solesmes Communal Cemetery
Cyril Bickford Isard	Helles Memorial
Alexander Jennings	Arras Flying Services Memorial
John Buchanan Kitchin	Duisans British Cemetery, Étrun
Cecil George Lachlan	Thiepval Memorial
Patrick Lionel Lethbridge	Loos Memorial
Francis Arthur River Malet	Gillingham (Woodlands) Cemetery
Eustace Alfred Morey Nichols	Guards' Cemetery, Lesboeufs
Claude Noyes	Unknown
Rowland Maund D'Ombrain	Basra Memorial
George Robert John Parkinson	Hollybrook Memorial, Southampton
Stephen Ralph Perry	Thiepval Memorial
Neville Henry Rogers	Hollybrook Memorial, Southampton
John Charles Reginald Rose	Bailleul Communal Cemetery (Nord)
Charles Frederick Noel Prince Sealy	Ypres (Menin Gate) Memorial
Michael Topham	Arras Flying Services Memorial
Cyril Francis Frederick Twynam	Cabaret-Rouge British Cemetery, Souchez
John Henry Walden-Vincent	Shrapnel Valley Cemetery
Neville Lascelles Ward	Hautrage Military Cemetery
Aubrey Webster	Unknown
James Stanley Lightfoot Welch	Queen's Cemetery, Puisieux
Oswald Wightwick	Le Tréport Military Cemetery
Sydney Wightwick	Divisional Collecting Post Cemetery and Extension
Edward Maurice Winch	Le Tréport Military Cemetery
Gordon Spivey Woodhead	Fampoux British Cemetery

Yardley Courtiers who died in the Second World War
Name	Where buried or commemorated
Charles Augustus Wallis Allford	Florence War Cemetery
Antony James Atkinson	Harare (Pioneer) Cemetery
Vyvian Quentery Blackden	Lemsterland (Lemmer) General Cemetery
Gavin Carfrae Borradaile	Berlin 1939–1945 War Cemetery
John William Thomas Bromham	Kiel War Cemetery
John Michael Bryan	Bretteville-sur-Laize Canadian War Cemetery
Richard Claude Harold Cantin	Sage War Cemetery
Humphrey Yale Chard	Marham (Holy Trinity) Churchyard
Murray Whitmore Christie	Ranville War Cemetery
Alan Ross Crowther	Durnbach War Cemetery
Cedric Owen Dunkels	Rheinberg War Cemetery
Henry Snaith Duval	Trincomalee War Cemetery
John Denis Elmore	Becklingen War Cemetery
Eric Gordon Fraser	Leigh (St Mary) Churchyard
John Ruthven Fraser	Unknown
Lawrence Donald Gardner	Unknown
Geoffrey Charles George	Minturno War Cemetery
Roy Thomson Greig	Malta Memorial
John Stuart Hallam	Alamein Memorial
Sidney Donald Hankey	Unknown
Holger Wynne Hansen-Raae, MC	Cassino War Cemetery
John Alexander Macallister Hayes	Berlin 1939–1945 War Cemetery
John Bruton Healey	Cleveleys (St Andrew) Church, Thornton-Cleveleys
Samuel Charles Holland Hood	Tilly-sur-Seulles War Cemetery
Eyre Osbourne Ievers	Kirby Wharf
George Hartville Jackson	Bergen-op-Zoom Canadian War Cemetery
Reginald Renouf Johnston	Runnymede Memorial
Mounteney Kortright	Dunkirk Memorial
Anthony Francis Nielsen Ladefoged	Great Bircham (St Mary) Churchyard
Thane Arthur Nielsen Ladefoged	Unknown
Leonard James Lendon-Smith	Oued Zarga War Cemetery
Ivor Lawrence Linay	Chatham Naval Memorial
Patrick Lloyd Morgan	Lee-on-Solent Memorial
Roger Maccs	Unknown
Edwin Lambton Maling	Shotley Royal Naval Cemetery
Geoffrey Northcote Christian Miéville	Runnymede Memorial
Harold Mitchell	Unknown
John Blackwell Sinclair Monypenny	Runnymede Memorial
Richard Lionel Stanley Morris	Portsmouth Naval Memorial
James Brindley Nicolson, VC, DFC	Singapore Memorial
Keith D'Ombrain Nott	Portsmouth Naval Memorial
John Jephson Nottidge	Berlin 1939–1945 War Cemetery
Charles Talbot Orton	Dozinghem Military Cemetery
John Ernest Orton	Rawalpindi War Cemetery
Frank Shearburn Pilditch	Reichswald Forest War Cemetery
David John Alwyne Pipe	Tilly-sur-Seulles War Cemetery
Geoffrey Philip Ponder	Taukkyan War Cemetery
Arthur Robert Porter	Runnymede Memorial
Peter Harvey O'Callaghan	Unknown
Arthur Lionel Boultbee Raven	Runnymede Memorial
John Hawkes Reed	Unknown
Leslie Ernest Sanderson	Cambridge Crematorium
John Barter Seigne	Inniscarra Church of Ireland Churchyard
Richard Edmund Stainbank	Vitry-les-Nogent Churchyard
James Douglas Steuart-Richardson	Tonbridge Cemetery
Peter Alfred Street	Bromley Hill Cemetery
Adrian John Vicary	Birmingham, County Borough
Kenneth Ward	Runnymede Memorial
James Edward Loxley Waring	Halstead (St Margaret) Churchyard
John Hylton Welford	Minster (Thanet) Cemetery
Irvine Syme Wheelwright	Runnymede Memorial
Peter Norman Witney	Stanley Military Cemetery
Peter Merideth Wooldridge	Runnymede Memorial

== Notable alumni ==
Name	At Yardley Court	Field	Known for	Ref.
Kenneth Warner	From 1901	Religion	Bishop of Edinburgh	
John Langdon-Davies	Early 1900s	Journalism; literature	Author and journalist	
Eric Bickmore	Until 1913	Sport; education	Cricketer for Kent and Oxford University, and later headmaster of the school	
Lionel Hedges		Sport	Kent cricketer	
Harry Andrews	From 1919	Acting	Actor	
Alan Keith-Lucas	From 1919	Academia	Professor of social work	
David Keith-Lucas	From 1919	Engineering	Aeronautical engineer	
Bryan Keith-Lucas	From 1919	Academia	Political scientist	
Arthur Young		Sport	England rugby union international	
John Ross Thompson	From 1927	Sport	Cricketer and rackets player	
Admiral of the Fleet Sir Edward Beckwith Ashmore, GCB, DSC	1930s	Military	First Sea Lord in the mid-1970s	
Vice-Admiral Sir Peter William Beckwith Ashmore, KCB, KCVO, DSC	Until 1934	Military	Royal Navy officer who became Master of the Household to the Sovereign	
General Sir Ian Gourlay	1930s	Military	Commandant General Royal Marines	
Admiral Sir David Williams	1930s	Military	Second Sea Lord	
Alec Graham	From 1937	Religion	Bishop of Newcastle	
Wing Commander Eric James Brindley Nicolson, VC, DFC	Until 1930	Military	Battle of Britain fighter pilot and the only RAF Fighter Command pilot awarded the Victoria Cross in the Second World War	
Trevor Wade		Military; aviation	Test pilot	
Major Guy Hudson, OBE, MC		Military; sport	Soldier and schoolmaster who had an England rugby trial in 1934 and played for Harlequins and the Barbarians	
Peter West		Broadcasting	BBC television presenter and sports commentator	
Elleston Trevor		Literature	Novelist, author of The Flight of the Phoenix and the Quiller spy novels	
Frederick Forsyth, CBE	1940s	Literature	Novelist, author of The Day of the Jackal	
David Marques	Late 1940s	Sport	England and British Lions rugby player who also played for Harlequins and the Barbarians, and crew member of the 1964 America's Cup challenger Sovereign	
Robert Fisk	1950s	Journalism	Writer and journalist, best known as a Middle East correspondent	
Bob Woolmer	Until 1961	Sport	England Test cricketer (19 Tests) and later an international coach	
Ian Bradley		Academia; broadcasting	Author, broadcaster, and retired academic	
Charles ffrench-Constant		Science	Neurology researcher specialising in multiple sclerosis	
Edward Tudor-Pole	1960s	Music; acting; television	Lead singer of Tenpole Tudor and presenter of The Crystal Maze	
Andrew Davenport		Television	Co-creator and writer of Teletubbies and creator of In the Night Garden	
Matthew Parker		Literature	Author of history books including Goldeneye	
Ed Smith		Sport; journalism	Author and journalist, and former professional cricketer for Kent, Middlesex, and England	
Ruaridh McConnochie		Sport	Rugby union player for England Rugby and Bath Rugby	
