= 331st Air Expeditionary Group =

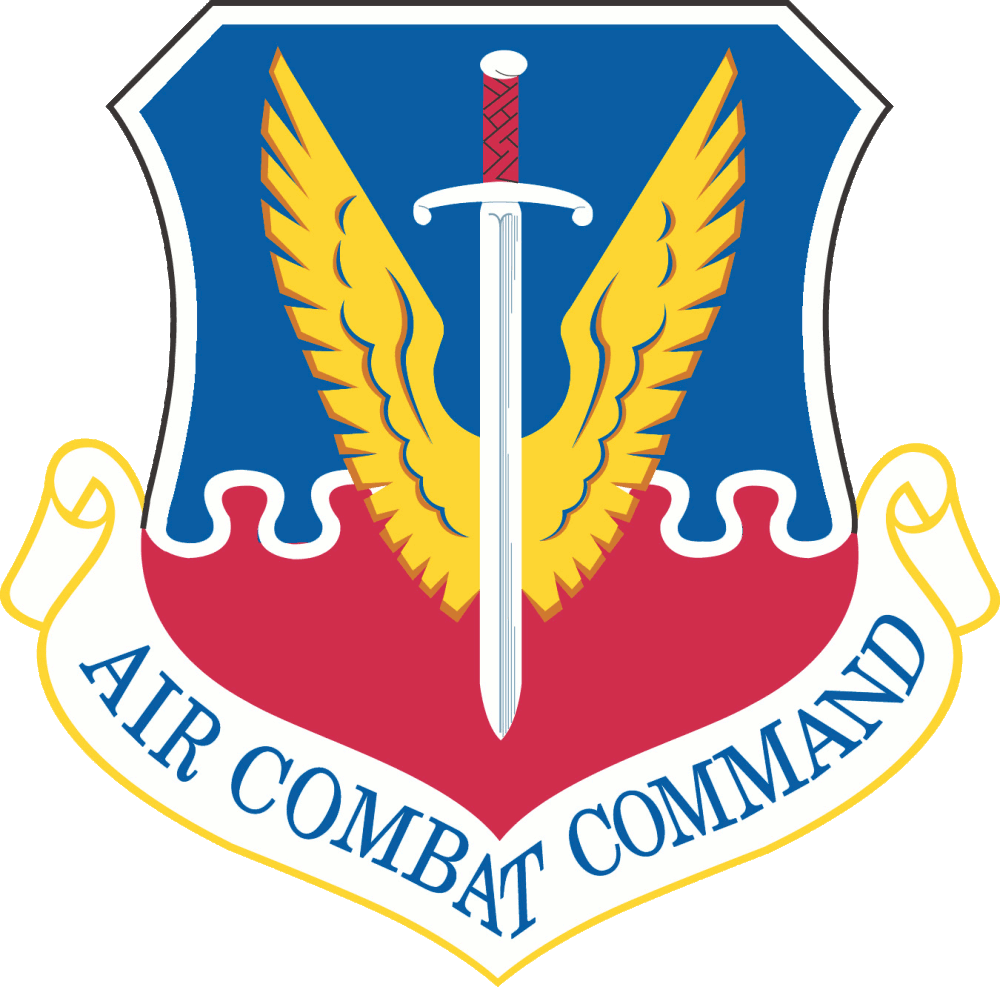
331st Air Expeditionary Group

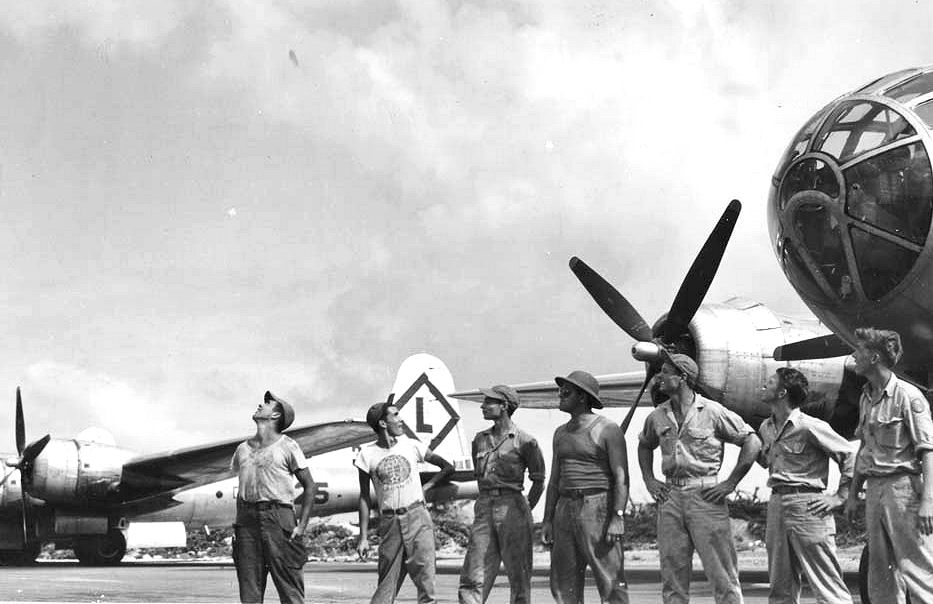
- 331st Group B-29s and ground crew, Northwest Field, Guam, 1945
- Active: 1942–1944; 1944–1946; 2008
- Country: United States
- Branch: United States Air Force
- Role: Command of expeditionary forces
- Part of: Air Combat Command
- Engagements: Pacific Ocean Theater of World War II

Insignia
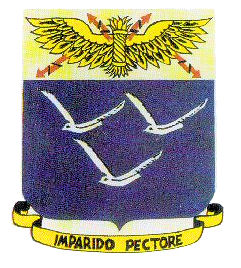
- 331st Bombardment Group emblem (Note: Approved 22 December 1942.)

The 331st Air Expeditionary Group is a provisional United States Air Force unit. It is assigned to Air Combat Command, (ACC) to activate or inactivate as needed. It was last active in 2008.

During World War II, the unit activated as the 331st Bombardment Group. It was initially a Boeing B-17 Flying Fortress and Consolidated B-24 Liberator Operational Training Unit (OTU). It became a Replacement Training Unit (RTU) in December 1943. It was inactivated on 1 April 1944 in a general reorganization of Army Air Forces training units. Late in the war the group was reactivated and trained as a Boeing B-29 Superfortress group The group served in the Pacific Ocean theater of World War II as part of Twentieth Air Force. The group's aircraft engaged in very heavy bombardment operations against Japan.

The group was converted to provisional status in 2008 and assigned to ACC to use as needed.

== History ==
=== Heavy bomber replacement training ===
The 331st Bombardment Group was first activated in July 1942 at Salt Lake City Army Air Base, Utah with the 461st, 462d, 463d and 464th Bombardment Squadrons assigned. In September it moved to Casper Army Air Field, where it conducted Boeing B-17 Flying Fortress replacement training until 1943, when it converted to the Consolidated B-24 Liberator. Replacement training units were oversized units which trained aircrews prior to their deployment to combat theaters. However, the Army Air Forces found that standard military units, based on relatively inflexible tables of organization, were not proving to be well adapted to the training mission. Accordingly, it adopted a more functional system in which each base was organized into a separate numbered unit, while the groups and squadrons acting as replacement training units were disbanded or inactivated. This resulted in the 331st, along with other units at Casper, being inactivated in the spring of 1944 and being replaced by the 211th AAF Base Unit (Combat Crew Training Station, Heavy), which assumed the 331st Group's mission, personnel, and equipment.

=== Very heavy bomber operations ===
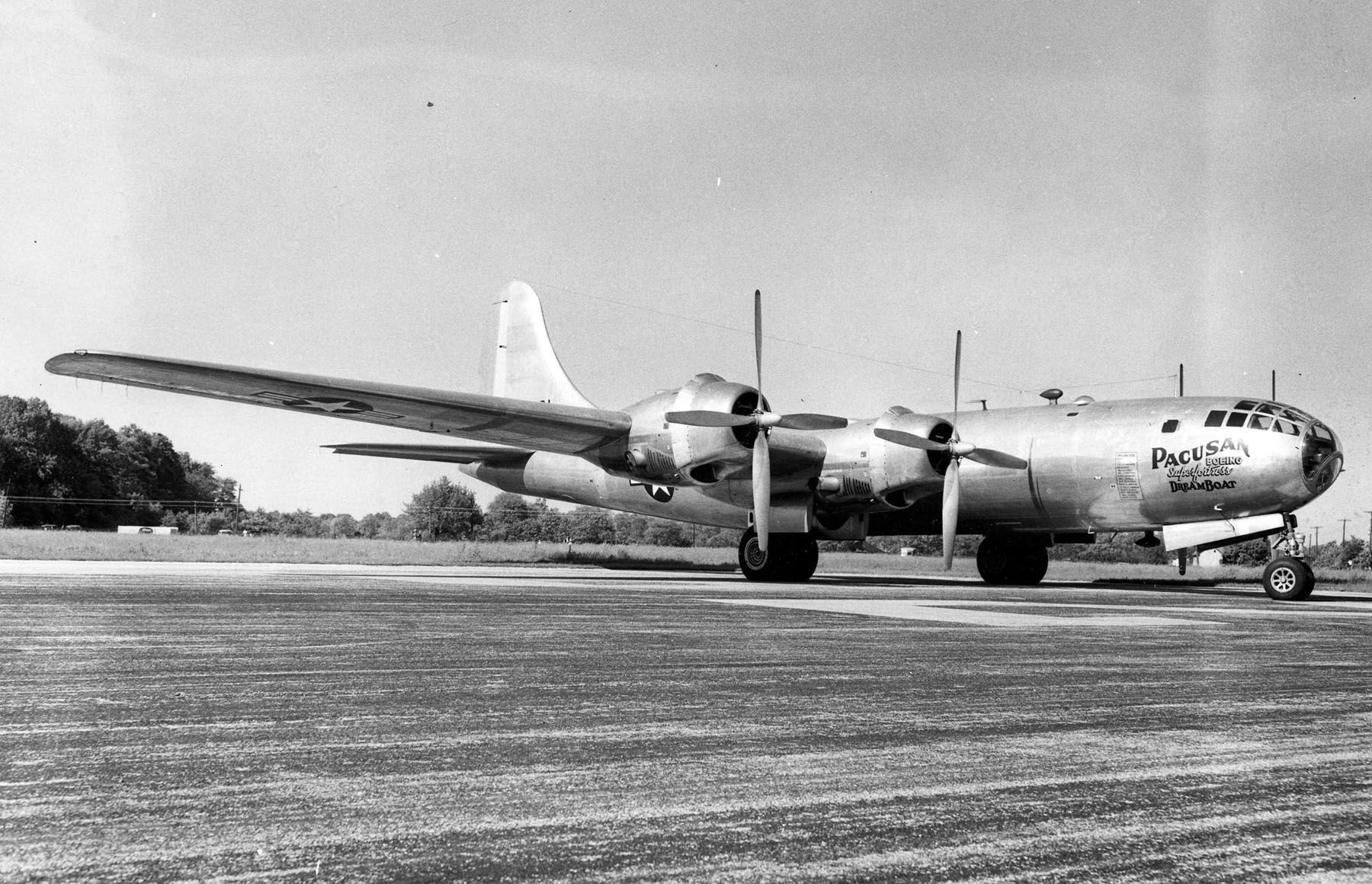
Bell-Atlanta B-29B-60-BA Superfortress "Pacusan Dreamboat" (44-84061)

It was redesignated the 331st Bombardment Group, Very Heavy and activated on 12 July 1944 at Dalhart Army Air Field, Texas and assigned to Second Air Force. It trained for combat with B-29B's initially at Dalhart, then at McCook Army Air Field, Nebraska.

The 331st was assigned the B-29B model. This model was built by Bell Aircraft's Atlanta plant. The B-29B was a limited production aircraft, built solely by Bell-Atlanta. It had all but the tail defensive armament removed, since experience had shown that by 1944 the only significant Japanese fighter attacks were coming from the rear. The tail gun was aimed and fired automatically by the new AN/APG-15B radar fire control system that detected the approaching enemy plane and made all the necessary calculations. The elimination of the turrets and the associated General Electric computerized gun system increased the top speed of the Superfortress to 364 mph at 25,000 feet and made the B-29B suitable for fast, unescorted hit-and-run bombing raids and photographic missions.

It moved to Northwest Field, Guam, April–June 1945, and was assigned to the 315th Bombardment Wing of Twentieth Air Force. It bombed Japanese-held Truk late in June 1945. It flew its first mission against the Japanese home islands on 9 July 1945 and afterward operated principally against the enemy's petroleum industry on Honshū. Despite the hazards of bad weather, fighter attacks, and heavy flak, the 331st bombed the coal liquefaction plant at Ube, the Mitsubishi-Hayama petroleum complex at Kawasaki, and the oil refinery and storage facilities at Shimotsu, in July and August 1945, and received a Distinguished Unit Citation for the missions.

After the war the group dropped food and supplies to Allied prisoners of war in Japan. It was inactivated on Guam on 15 April 1946.

=== Hurricane Ike (2008) ===
The unit was reactivated at Randolph Air Force Base, Texas, in 2008 as the 331st Air Expeditionary Group, a special unit formed to support Hurricane Ike relief efforts. Units and personnel assigned to the 331st came from both the active and reserve components of the Air Force and Navy.

== Lineage ==
- Constituted as the 331st Bombardment Group (Heavy) on 1 July 1942

Activated on 6 July 1942
Inactivated on 1 April 1944

- Redesignated 331st Bombardment Group, Very Heavy and activated on 12 July 1944

Inactivated on 15 April 1946

- Redesignated 331st Air Expeditionary Group, converted to provisional status and assigned to Air Combat Command to activate or inactivate any time after 10 September 2008

Activated 10 September 2008
Inactivated on 16 September 2008

=== Assignments ===
- II Bomber Command, 6 July 1942
- Second Air Force, 6 October 1943 – 1 April 1944 (attached to 17th Bombardment Operational Training Wing, 12 July 1944 – 6 April 1945)
- 315th Bombardment Wing, 12 May 1945 – 15 April 1946
- Air Combat Command

Attached to First Air Force, 10–16 September 2008

=== Components ===
- 461st Bombardment Squadron, 6 July 1942 – 1 April 1944
- 462d Bombardment Squadron, 6 July 1942 – 1 April 1944
- 463d Bombardment Squadron, 6 July 1942 – 1 April 1944
- 464th Bombardment Squadron, 6 July 1942 – 1 April 1944
- 355th Bombardment Squadron 1944–1946 (B-29B)
- 356th Bombardment Squadron 1944–1946 (B-29B)
- 357th Bombardment Squadron 1944–1946 (B-29B)
- 461st Bombardment Squadron 1942–1944 (B-29B)

=== Stations ===
- Salt Lake City Army Air Base, Utah 6 July 1942 – 15 September 1942
- Casper Army Air Field, Wyoming, 15 September 1942 – 1 April 1944, 6 July 1942 – 1 April 1944
- Dalhart Army Air Field, Texas, 12 July 1944 – 14 November 1944
- McCook Army Air Field, Nebraska, 14 November 1944 – 6 April 1945
- Northwest Field (Guam), Mariana Islands, 12 May 1945 – 15 April 1946
- Randolph Air Force Base, Texas, 10–16 September 2008
