= 355 Gabriella =

Main-belt asteroid

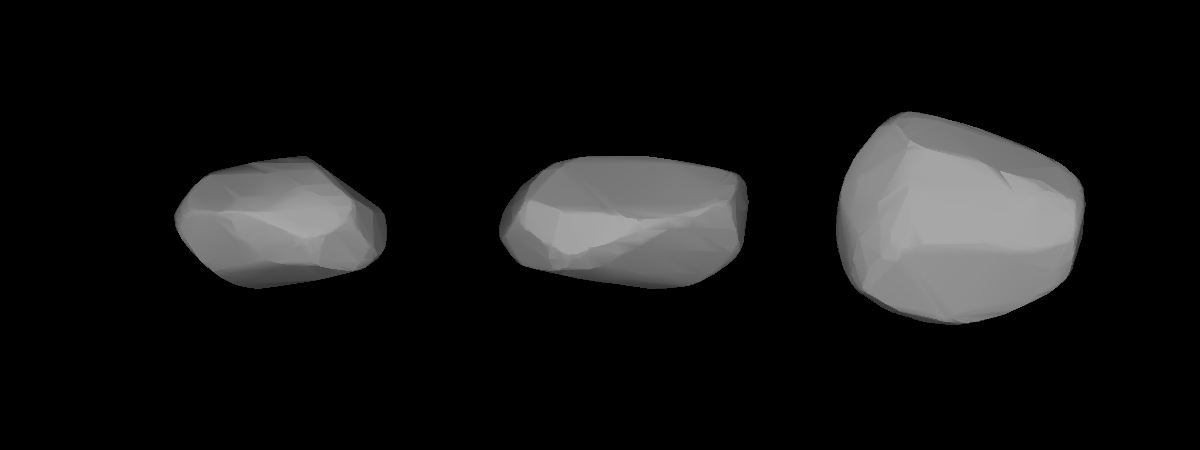
- A three-dimensional model of 355 Gabriella based on its light curve

Discovery
- Discovered by: Auguste Charlois
- Discovery date: 20 January 1893

Designations
- Named after: Gabrielle Flammarion
- Alternative designations: 1893 E
- Minor planet category: Main belt

Orbital characteristics
- Epoch 31 July 2016 (JD 2457600.5)
- Uncertainty parameter 0
- Observation arc: 123.23 yr (45008 d)
- Aphelion: 2.80813 AU (420.090 Gm)
- Perihelion: 2.26681 AU (339.110 Gm)
- Semi-major axis: 2.53747 AU (379.600 Gm)
- Eccentricity: 0.10667
- Orbital period (sidereal): 4.04 yr (1476.4 d)
- Mean anomaly: 210.870°
- Mean motion: 0° 14^{m} 37.82^{s} / day
- Inclination: 4.28364°
- Longitude of ascending node: 351.825°
- Argument of perihelion: 105.626°

Physical characteristics
- Dimensions: 22.79±1.1 km
- Synodic rotation period: 4.830 h (0.2013 d)
- Geometric albedo: 0.2353±0.023
- Absolute magnitude (H): 10.1

355 Gabriella is a typical Main belt asteroid.

It was discovered by Auguste Charlois on 20 January 1893 in Nice and named after French astronomer Gabrielle Renaudot Flammarion.
