= 355th Tactical Airlift Squadron =

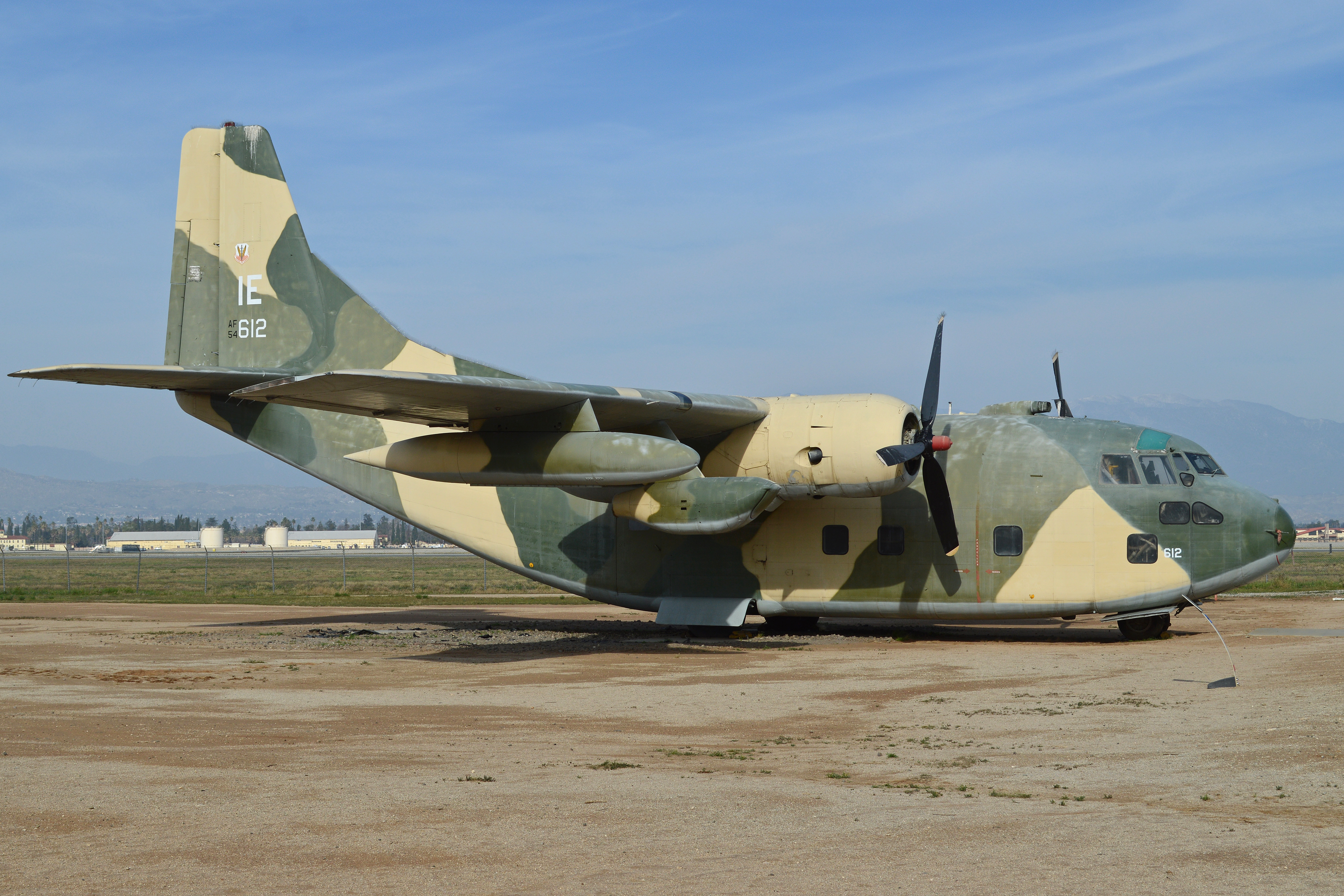
- C-123 Provider flown by the squadron (Note: Aircraft is Fairchild C-123K Provider, serial 54-612. Originally constructed as a C-123B. This aircraft is on display at the March AFB Museum. Its last assignment was with the 355th.)
- Active: 1942–1944; 1944–1946; 1949–1951; 1952–1982
- Country: United States
- Branch: United States Air Force
- Role: Airlift
- Mottos: You Call, We Haul (1961-1982)
- Decorations: Distinguished Unit Citation; Air Force Outstanding Unit Award

Insignia
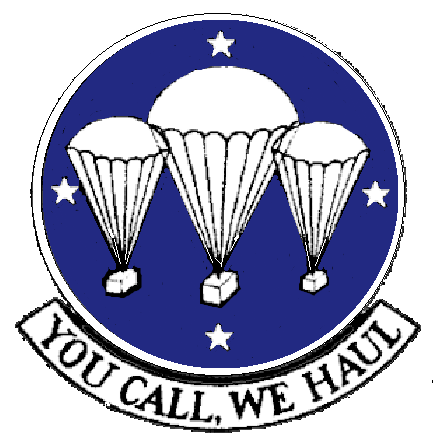
- 355th Tactical Airlift Squadron emblem (Note: Approved 7 July 1961. Description: On an Air Force blue disc bordered white, three white parachutes palewise, carrying cargo, one large one between two smaller ones, all between four stars, one in dexter, one in chief, one in sinister, and one in base, all white; outlines and details Air force blue throughout.)

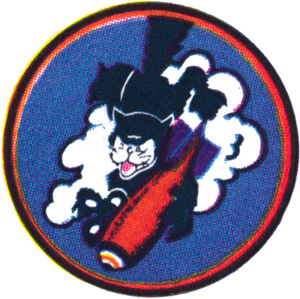
- 355 Bombardment Sq emblem (Note: Approved 16 August 1943.)

The 355th Tactical Airlift Squadron is an inactive United States Air Force unit. Its last assignment was with 906th Tactical Airlift Group at Rickenbacker Air National Guard Base, Ohio, where it was inactivated on 1 July 1982.

The squadron was first activated during World War II as a heavy bombardment training unit, serving both as an Operational Training Unit, then as a Replacement Training Unit. It was inactivated in 1944, in a general reorganization of Army Air Forces training and support units. It was soon activated again as a very heavy bombardment squadron. It deployed to the Pacific, where it earned a Distinguished Unit Citation while participating in strategic bombing campaign against Japan. It was inactivated in Guam during the spring of 1946.

The squadron was again activated in the reserve as the 355th Troop Carrier Squadron in 1945. It was called to active duty for the Korean War in 1951, but was inactivated a week later, with its personnel used as fillers for other units. It was reactivated in 1952, again serving on active duty during the Cuban Missile Crisis.

== History ==
=== World War II ===
==== Heavy bomber training unit ====
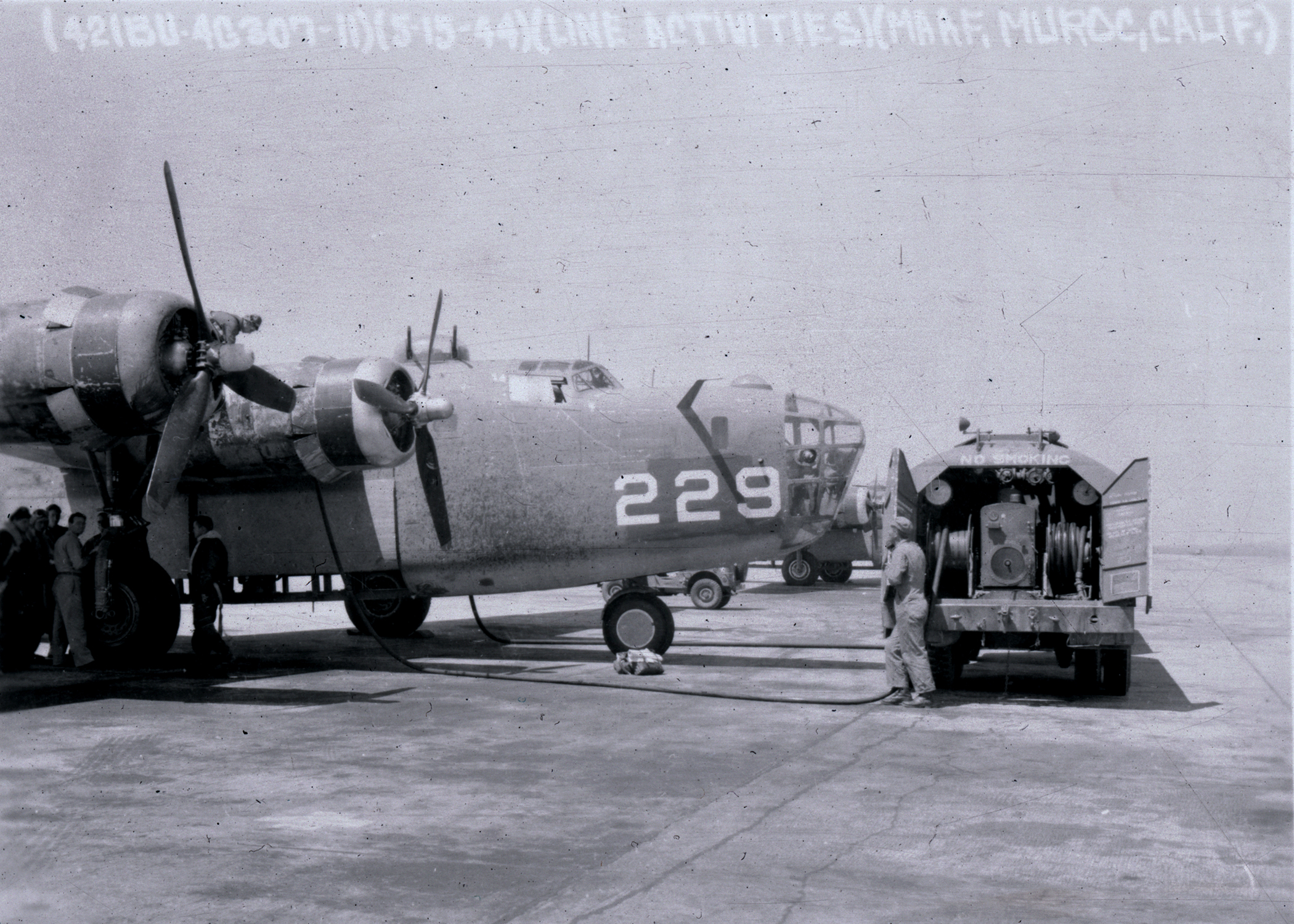
A B-24 of a training unit

The squadron was first activated as the 355th Bombardment Squadron at Geiger Field, Washington in June 1942 as one of the four squadrons of the 302d Bombardment Group. The squadron made a number of moves during the year before becoming an Operational Training Unit (OTU) in early 1943. The OTU program involved the use of an oversized parent unit to provide cadres to “satellite groups " The OTU program was patterned after the unit training system of the Royal Air Force. OTUs assumed responsibility for satellite unit training and oversaw their expansion with graduates of Army Air Forces Training Command schools to become effective combat units. Phase I training concentrated on individual training in crewmember specialties. Phase II training emphasized the coordination for the crew to act as a team. The final phase concentrated on operation as a unit.

By the end of the year most combat units had been activated and almost three quarters of them had deployed overseas. With the exception of special programs, like forming Boeing B-29 Superfortress units, training “fillers” for existing units became more important than unit training. The squadron became a Replacement Training Unit. Replacement training units were also oversized units, but trained aircrews prior to their deployment to combat theaters. However, the Army Air Forces also found that standard military units like the 355th, based on relatively inflexible tables of organization, were not well adapted to the training mission. Accordingly, it adopted a more functional system in which each base was organized into a separate numbered unit, while the groups and squadrons acting as RTUs were disbanded or inactivated. This resulted in the squadron, along with other elements of the 302d Group at Chatham Army Air Field, Georgia, being inactivated in the spring of 1944 and being replaced by the 114th AAF Base Unit (Bombardment (Heavy)), which assumed the group's mission, personnel, and equipment

==== Combat in the Pacific ====
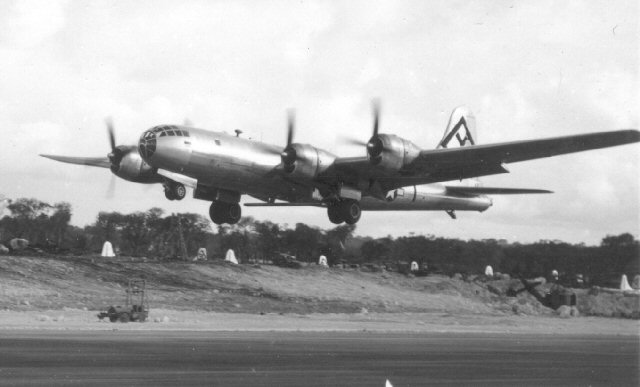
B-29B showing antenna for the AN/APQ-7 radar

In July 1944, the squadron was reactivated at Dalhart Army Air Field, Texas, where it was assigned to the 331st Bombardment Group. At Dalhart, the squadron built up to full strength, moving to Harvard Army Air Field, Nebraska, in November 1944 when it was fully manned and equipped and aircrews began to arrive. Although nominally a very heavy bomber unit, the squadron flew Boeing B-17 Flying Fortresses throughout 1944. In September, key squadron personnel trained at the Army Air Forces School of Applied Tactics, in Florida. Training with B-29 Superfortresses began in December 1944. Winter weather in the Midwest resulted in a notable decrease in flying training hours flown. As a result, the 315th Bombardment Wing implemented a training program, called the "Gypsy Task Force" in which its units would deploy to bases in the Caribbean to take advantage of the better flying weather there. The squadron flew training missions from Vernam Field, Jamaica in this program.

The squadron's B-29s were stripped of most defensive guns and the central fire control system to increase speed and bomb load, The tail gun was aimed and fired using the new AN/APG-15B radar fire control system for its tail guns that detected the approaching enemy plane and made all the necessary calculations. In addition, their bombing radars were upgraded to the AN/APQ-7. The weight reduction from this modification also permitted a larger bomb load on the squadron's bombers.

The squadron left McCook for deployment to the Pacific in April 1945. The ground echelon left for the Port of Embarkation at Seattle on 7 April and boarded the SS Cape Newenham, sailing on the 12th. It arrived at Northwest Field, Guam on 12 May, although the air echelon, staging from Mather Field, California only arrived in late June.

The squadron entered combat in June, with a bombing raid against an airfield on Truk. It flew its first mission against the Japanese home islands on 9 July and afterwards operated principally against the enemy's petroleum industry on Honshu. It attacked the coal liquification plant at Ube, the Mitsubishi-Hayama petroleum complex at Kawasaki, (Note: This included four adjacent facilities operated by Standard Oil, Rising Sun Oil, Nippon Oil, and Mitsui Products. Starr, p. 97.) and the oil refinery and storage facility at Shimotsu. For pressing these attacks despite bad weather, and heavy fighter and flak defenses, the squadron was awarded a Distinguished Unit Citation The squadron flew its final mission on the night of 14/15 August 1945.

Following V-J Day, the squadron flew supply drop missions to prisoner of war camps in Japan and Mongolia. On 2 September, it participated in a show of force over Tokyo during the surrender ceremony. Personnel began rotating back to the United States in November 1945, when the 331st Group's strength was reduced from 50 to 39 Superfortresses and crews began ferrying surplus bombers back to the United States. The squadron was reduced to a paper unit on 15 February 1945, with its remaining personnel and planes being transferred to the 501st Bombardment Group. It was inactivated on Guam on 15 April 1946.

=== Air Force reserve operations ===
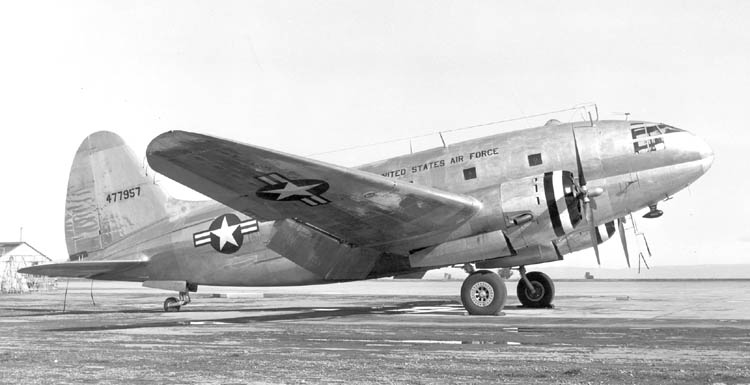
Curtiss C-46D of the Air Force Reserve

The squadron was redesignated the 355th Troop Carrier Squadron and activated in the reserve at McChord Air Force Base, Washington in late June 1949. The squadron was a new type of reserve unit, a corollary unit, which was a reserve unit integrated with an active duty unit. The plan was viewed as the best method to train reservists by mixing them with an existing regular unit to perform duties alongside the regular unit, in this case, the 62d Troop Carrier Wing, using the regular unit’s aircraft. In 1949, it flew Fairchild C-82 Packets, then later, Douglas C-54 Skymasters. The program's objective was to permit reservists to be employed immediately upon mobilization, either as individuals or as a unit. However, corollary unit training had to be balanced against the regular unit’s mission, and deployment and exercise participation interrupted training activities. The 355th, like all reserve corollary units was mobilized for the Korean War. It was called to active duty on 1 June 1951. Its personnel were used as fillers for the host wing at McChord, the 325th Fighter-Interceptor Wing, and the squadron was inactivated a week later.

The squadron was again activated in the reserves in June 1952 at Clinton County Air Force Base, Ohio. The reserve mobilization for the Korean War, however, had left the reserve without aircraft, and the unit did not receive aircraft until July 1952, when it began to receive Curtiss C-46 Commandos. In the summer of 1956, the squadron participated in Operation Sixteen Ton during its two weeks of active duty training. Sixteen Ton was performed entirely by reserve troop carrier units and moved United States Coast Guard equipment From Floyd Bennett Naval Air Station to Isla Grande Airport in Puerto Rico and San Salvador in the Bahamas. After the success of Operation Sixteen Ton, the squadron began to use inactive duty training periods for Operation Swift Lift, transporting high priority cargo for the Air Force and Operation Ready Swap, transporting aircraft engines, between Air Materiel Command’s depots. In addition, the squadron flew occasional airlift missions overseas.

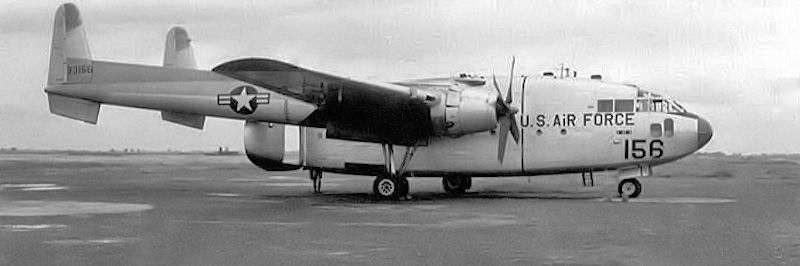
C-119G Flying Boxcar as flown by the squadron

During the mid-1950s, the Joint Chiefs of Staff were pressuring the Air Force to provide more wartime airlift. At the same time, about 150 Fairchild C-119 Flying Boxcars became available from the active force. By the following year, the squadron had traded its Commandos for the newer Flying Boxcars. In 1958, the squadron began converting to the reserve technician program. Under this program, some squadron reservists were also full-time civil service employees and provided continuity and training for traditional reservists assigned to the squadron. This system was more cost effective than the previous system, which required a regular unit, the 2252nd Air Force Reserve Flying Training Center, to provide required training for the squadron. The following year, Continental Air Command adopted the dual deputy organization. The 302d Troop Carrier Group was inactivated, and the squadron was assigned directly to the 302d Troop Carrier Wing.

Although mobilization of an entire wing was not a problem, mobilizing a single flying squadron and elements to support it proved difficult. This weakness was demonstrated in the partial mobilization of reserve units during the Berlin Crisis of 1961. To resolve this, Continental Air Command, (ConAC) determined to reorganize its reserve wings by establishing groups with support elements for each of its troop carrier squadrons at the start of 1962. This reorganization would facilitate mobilization of elements of wings in various combinations when needed.

In the fall of 1962, the squadron was called to active duty a second time for the Cuban Missile Crisis, although it was released on 22 November 1962, the mobilization delayed the formation of troop carrier groups. On 11 February 1963, the squadron was assigned to the 906th Troop Carrier Group, which included a combat support squadron, a materiel squadron and a medical unit. By the mid-1960s, squadron aircraft and crews performed worldwide airlift missions and participated in numerous tactical exercises. In January 1970, the squadron was redesignated the 355th Special Operations Squadron, focusing on training crews on the Fairchild AC-119.

The squadron moved to Lockbourne Air Force Base in late July 1971. At Lockbourne, it re-equipped with Fairchild C-123K Providers, and returned to the 355th Tactical Airlift Squadron designation. In April 1973, the wing assumed the aerial spraying mission from the 4500th Special Aerial Spray Flight at Langley Air Force Base, Virginia, using UC-123Ks. An active duty entomologist was attached to the squadron. Insect suppression missions frequently took squadron crews to Central America, the Caribbean, the Azores, North Africa, islands of the Pacific, and to many U.S. points.

The 906th Group inactivated in September 1975, and the squadron was again assigned directly to the 302nd Wing. This action was reversed in April 1981, when the 906th was reactivated. In May 1982 the squadron trained members of the Salvadoran Air Force on the UC-123K. The UC-123 was removed from Air Force service, except for four, which were transferred to the 907th Tactical Airlift Group when the 906th Group moved to Wright-Patterson Air Force Base to become a fighter unit and the 355th inactivated on 1 July 1982.

== Lineage ==
- Constituted as the 355 Bombardment Squadron (Heavy) on 28 January 1942

Activated on 1 June 1942
Inactivated on 10 April 1944

- Redesignated 355 Bombardment Squadron, Very Heavy on 27 June 1944

Activated on 7 July 1944
Inactivated on 15 April 1946

- Redesignated 355th Troop Carrier Squadron, Medium on 16 May 1949

Activated in the reserve on 27 June 1949
Redesignated 355th Troop Carrier Squadron, Heavy on 28 January 1950
Ordered to active service on 1 June 1951
Inactivated on 8 June 1951

- Redesignated 355th Troop Carrier Squadron, Medium on 26 May 1952

Activated in the reserve on 14 June 1952
Ordered to active duty on 28 October 1962
Released from active duty on 28 November 1962
Redesignated 355th Tactical Airlift Squadron on 1 July 1967
Redesignated 355th Special Operations Squadron on 25 January 1970
Redesignated 355th Tactical Airlift Squadron on 26 July 1971
Inactivated on 1 July 1982

=== Assignments ===
- 302d Bombardment Group, 1 June 1942 – 10 April 194
- 331st Bombardment Group, 7 July 1944 – 15 April 1946
- 302d Troop Carrier Group, 27 June 1949 – 8 June 1951
- 302d Troop Carrier Group, 14 June 1952
- 302d Troop Carrier Wing, 14 April 1959
- 906th Troop Carrier Group (later 906th Tactical Airlift Group, 906th Special Operations Group, 906th Tactical Airlift Group), 11 February 1963
- 302d Tactical Airlift Wing, 1 September 1975
- 906th Tactical Airlift Group, 1 April 1981 – 1 July 1982

=== Stations ===
- Geiger Field, Washington, 1 June 1942
- Davis–Monthan Field, Arizona, 23 June 1942
- Wendover Field, Utah, 30 July 1942
- Pueblo Army Air Base, Colorado, 30 September 1942
- Davis–Monthan Field, Arizona, 1 December 1942
- Clovis Army Air Field, New Mexico, 29 January 1943
- Langley Field, Virginia, 17 December 1943
- Chatham Army Air Field, Georgia, 27 January – 10 April 1944
- Dalhart Army Air Field, Texas, 7 July 1944
- McCook Army Air Field, Nebraska, 22 November 1944 – 8 April 1945
- Northwest Field, Guam, Mariana Islands, 12 May 1945 – 15 April 1946
- McChord Air Force Base, Washington, 27 June 1949 – 8 June 1961
- Clinton County Air Force Base, Ohio, 14 June 1952
- Lockbourne Air Force Base (later Rickenbacker Air Force Base, Rickenbacker Air National Guard Base), Ohio, 26 July 1971 – 1 July 1982

=== Aircraft ===
- Consolidated B-24 Liberator (1942–1944)
- Boeing B-17 Flying Fortress (1944)
- Boeing B-29B Superfortress (1945–1946)
- Fairchild C-82 Packet (1949)
- Douglas C-54 Skymaster (1949–1951)
- Curtiss C-46 Commando (1952–1957)
- Fairchild C-119 Flying Boxcar (1956–1971)
- Fairchild C-123 Provider (1971–1982)

=== Awards and campaigns ===
Award streamer	Award	Dates	Notes
	Distinguished Unit Citation	22–29 July 1945	Japan, 355th Bombardment Squadron
	Air Force Outstanding Unit Award	1 January–31 December 1970	355th Special Operations Squadron

Campaign Streamer	Campaign	Dates	Notes
	American Theater without inscription	1 June 1943–1 April 1944, 7 July 1944–8 April 1945	355th Bombardment Squadron
	Air Offensive, Japan	12 May 1945 – 2 September 1945	355th Bombardment Squadron
	Western Pacific	12 May 1945 – 2 September 1945	355th Bombardment Squadron
	Eastern Mandates	June 1945–July 1945 (Note: Credit awarded for actual combat in theater outside dates of campaign. Maurer, Combat Squadrons, p. 802.)	355th Bombardment Squadron

== See also ==
- List of United States Air Force airlift squadrons
- B-17 Flying Fortress units of the United States Army Air Forces
- B-24 Liberator units of the United States Army Air Forces
- List of B-29 Superfortress operators
