= No. 355 Squadron RAF =

Royal Air Force heavy bomber squadron of World War II

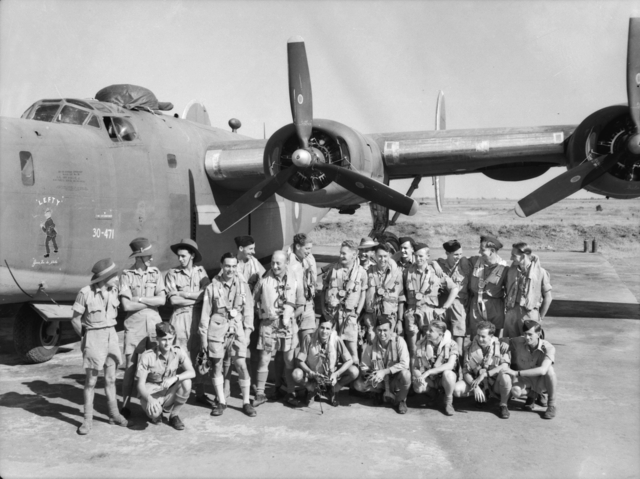
- 355 Squadron personnel, November 1944
- Active: 18 August 1943 – 31 May 1946
- Country: United Kingdom
- Branch: Royal Air Force
- Motto(s): Latin: Liberamus Per Caerula (Translation: "We liberate through tropical skies")

Insignia
- Squadron Badge heraldry: An elephant's head affronté

Aircraft flown
- Bomber: Consolidated Liberator

No. 355 Squadron RAF was a long-range bomber squadron based in British India from August 1943 until it disbanded in May 1946. Raised for service during the Second World War, the squadron was equipped with Consolidated Liberator aircraft and carried out operations against the Japanese during the Burma campaign.

== History ==
The squadron was formed at Salbani, Bengal, British India on 18 August 1943, and carried out its first bombing mission on 20 November 1943. The squadron mounted numerous raids on the Burma–Siam railway along with other important targets such as bridges, airfields, port facilities, supply dumps, gun positions, and marshalling yards. During this period, the squadron included a significant number of Royal Australian Air Force (RAAF) and Royal New Zealand Air Force (RNZAF) aircrew personnel, attached to it under the British Commonwealth Air Training Plan.

Wing Commander James Brindley Nicolson, recipient of the only Victoria Cross awarded during the Battle of Britain, was killed 2 May 1945, when the 355 Squadron Liberator he was flying in as an observer, crashed into the Bay of Bengal shortly after an engine caught fire. The last raid carried out by the squadron was on 7 August 1945 against the Burma–Siam railway.

After the war, 355 Squadron dropped emergency food supplies to Prisoners of War, and starving civilians in Burma. Between January and April 1946 the squadron operated from Digri, a little north of Salbani, returning to Salbani (west of Calcutta) where it undertook aerial survey work shortly before it disbanded on 31 May 1946.

== Aircraft operated ==
Aircraft operated by no. 355 Squadron RAF, data from
From	To	Aircraft	Version
October 1943	July 1944	Consolidated Liberator	Mk.III
March 1944	September 1945	Consolidated Liberator	Mk.VI
August 1945	May 1946	Consolidated Liberator	Mk.VIII

== Squadron bases ==
Bases and airfields used by no. 355 Squadron RAF, data from
From	To	Base	Remark
18 August 1943	3 January 1946	RAF Salbani, Bengal, British India	Dets. at RAF Dhubalia, Bengal; RAF Digri, Bengal and RAF Pegu ('Pilsener'), Burma
3 January 1946	3 April 1946	RAF Digri, Bengal, British India	Det. at RAF Pegu, Burma
3 April 1946	31 May 1946	RAF Salbani, Bengal, British India	Det. at RAF Pegu, Burma
