= 355 BC =

355 BC in various calendars
Gregorian calendar	355 BC; CCCLV BC
Ab urbe condita	399
Ancient Egypt era	XXX dynasty, 26
Pharaoh	Nectanebo II, 6
Ancient Greek Olympiad (summer)	106th Olympiad, year 2
Assyrian calendar	4396
Balinese saka calendar	N/A
Bengali calendar	−948 – −947
Berber calendar	596
Buddhist calendar	190
Burmese calendar	−992
Byzantine calendar	5154–5155
Chinese calendar	乙丑年 (Wood Ox); 2343 or 2136 — to — 丙寅年 (Fire Tiger); 2344 or 2137
Coptic calendar	−638 – −637
Discordian calendar	812
Ethiopian calendar	−362 – −361
Hebrew calendar	3406–3407
- Hindu calendars
Vikram Samvat	−298 – −297
Shaka Samvat	N/A
Kali Yuga	2746–2747
Holocene calendar	9646
Iranian calendar	976 BP – 975 BP
Islamic calendar	1006 BH – 1005 BH
Javanese calendar	N/A
Julian calendar	N/A
Korean calendar	1979
Minguo calendar	2266 before ROC 民前2266年
Nanakshahi calendar	−1822
Thai solar calendar	188–189
Tibetan calendar	ཤིང་མོ་གླང་ལོ་ (female Wood-Ox) −228 or −609 or −1381 — to — མེ་ཕོ་སྟག་ལོ་ (male Fire-Tiger) −227 or −608 or −1380

The year 355 BC was a year of the pre-Julian Roman calendar. At the time, it was known as the Year of the Consulship of Peticus and Poplicola (or, less frequently, year 399 Ab urbe condita). The denomination 355 BC for this year has been used since the early medieval period, when the Anno Domini calendar era became the prevalent method in Europe for naming years.

== Events ==
=== By place ===
==== Greece ====
- King Artaxerxes III of Persia forces Athens to conclude a peace which requires the city to leave Asia Minor and to acknowledge the independence of its rebellious allies.
- King Archidamus III of Sparta supports Phocis against Thebes in the "Sacred War".
- Chares' war party in Athens is replaced by one under Eubulus which favours peace. Eubulus restores the economic position of Athens without increasing the burden of taxation and improves the Athenian fleet while its docks and fortifications are repaired.

== Births ==
- Cassander, companion of Alexander the Great, successor king of Macedonia and founder of Antipatrid dynasty (approximate date) (d. c. 297 BC)
